= Bill Neskovski =

Bill Neškovski
- Born: Blagoja Neškovski; 20 January 1964; Bitola; SFR Yugoslavia
- Died: 25 November 1989 (aged 25); Australia
- Occupation: Author

Blagoja "Bill" Neškovski (Macedonian: Благоја „Бил“ Нешковски, 20 January 1964 – 25 November 1989) was a Macedonian Australian playwright and actor. He wrote in both English and Macedonian.

Born Blagoja Neškovski in Bitola, SFR Yugoslavia, his family migrated to Australia in 1974 and settled in the industrial town of Port Kembla. He wrote his first play, Full House, while in his final year at Warrawong High School and then studied creative arts at the University of Wollongong and an acting course at NIDA. His second play, Say Goodbye to the Past, premiered at Theatre South in 1985.

He became a member of the Nimrod Theatre Company in 1986, and in 1989, he wrote his third and final play, Conqueror Cole. It was performed in Wollongong, Sydney, Melbourne, as well as in his homeland SR Macedonia. Craig Pearce (who co-wrote the script for Strictly Ballroom with Baz Luhrmann) played the role of Sašo in the 1989 Griffin Theatre Company production of Say Goodbye to the Past.

Neškovski's plays deal with issues confronting the Macedonian migrant experience in Australia. Cultural dislocation is an underlying theme in the plays. One month before his early death, he was accepted as a member of the Association of Writers of Macedonia. He was also a member of an amateur Macedonian-Australian theatre group Macedonian Theatre of Illawarra which, after his death, took his name to become the Macedonian Theatre Bill Neškovski.

The Sydney Morning Herald published an obituary on 29 November 1989. He was posthumously given a Special Award for distinguished contribution to Australian literature in the 1991 New South Wales Premier's Literary Awards.

== Bibliography ==
- Three Plays: Full House, Say Goodbye to the Past, Conqueror Cole. (Sydney: Macedonian Literary, 1990) ISBN 0-9587454-2-0
