= Macedonian Evangelical United Church, Preston =

Macedonian Evangelical United Church
- Македонската Евангелска Обединета Црква; Makedonska Evangelska Obedineta Crkva
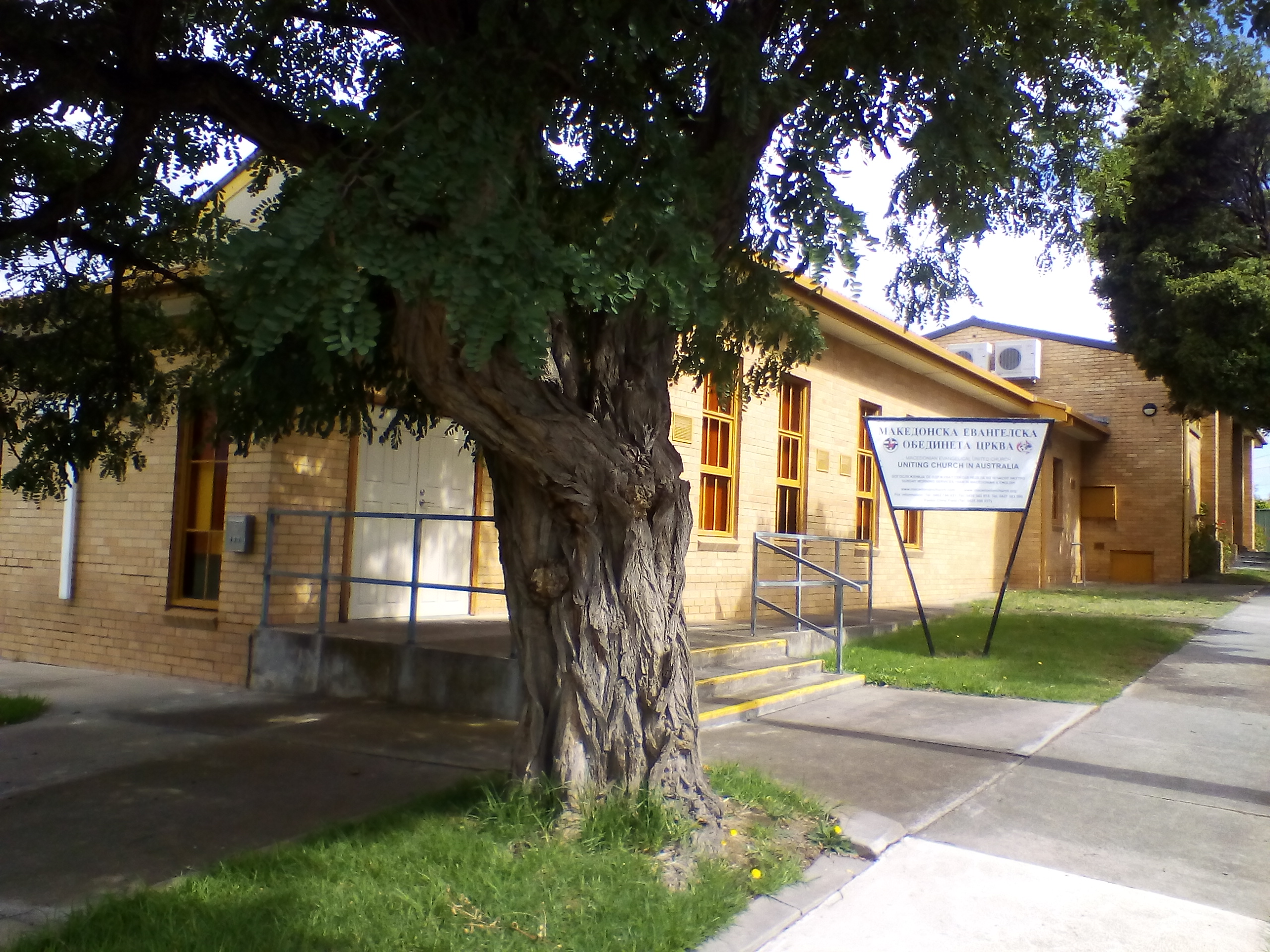

- Location in greater metropolitan Melbourne
- 37°44′06″S 145°01′00″E
- Location: 183 Wood St, Preston 3072, Melbourne, Victoria
- Country: Australia
- Denomination: Uniting Church in Australia
- Website: Macedonian Evangelical United Church

History
- Status: Church

Architecture
- Functional status: Active
- Architectural type: Church

Clergy
- Priest: Pastor Chris Field

The Macedonian Evangelical United Church (Macedonian: Македонската Евангелска Обединета Црква, Makedonska Evangelska Obedineta Crkva) is the Macedonian parish of the Uniting Church in Australia (UCA) located in Preston, a suburb of northern Melbourne, Victoria, Australia. The Methodist Church parish of the UCA was formed during the mid 1970s and links are maintained between Preston church and the Evangelical Methodist Church based in the Balkans.

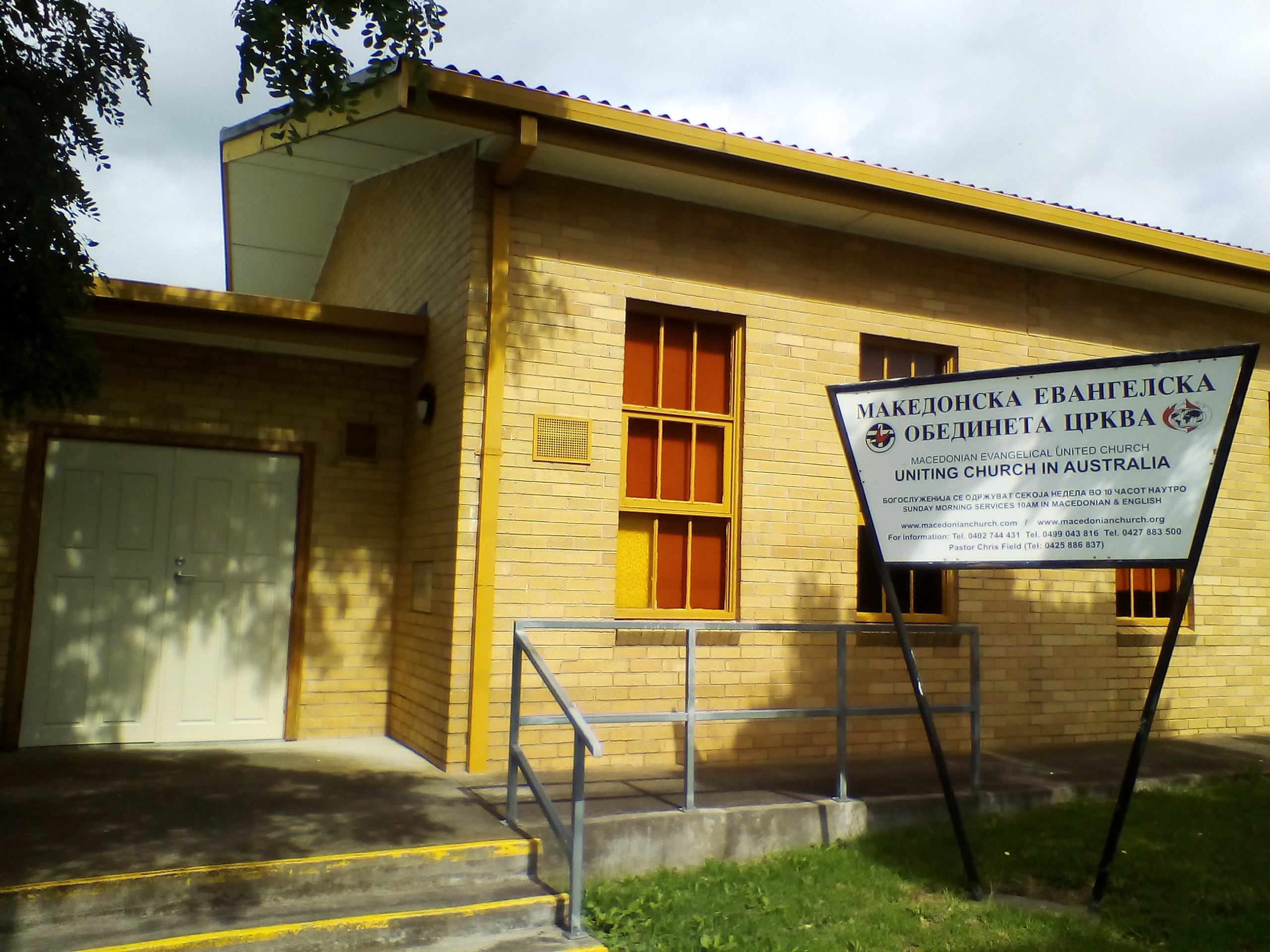
Macedonian Evangelical United Church

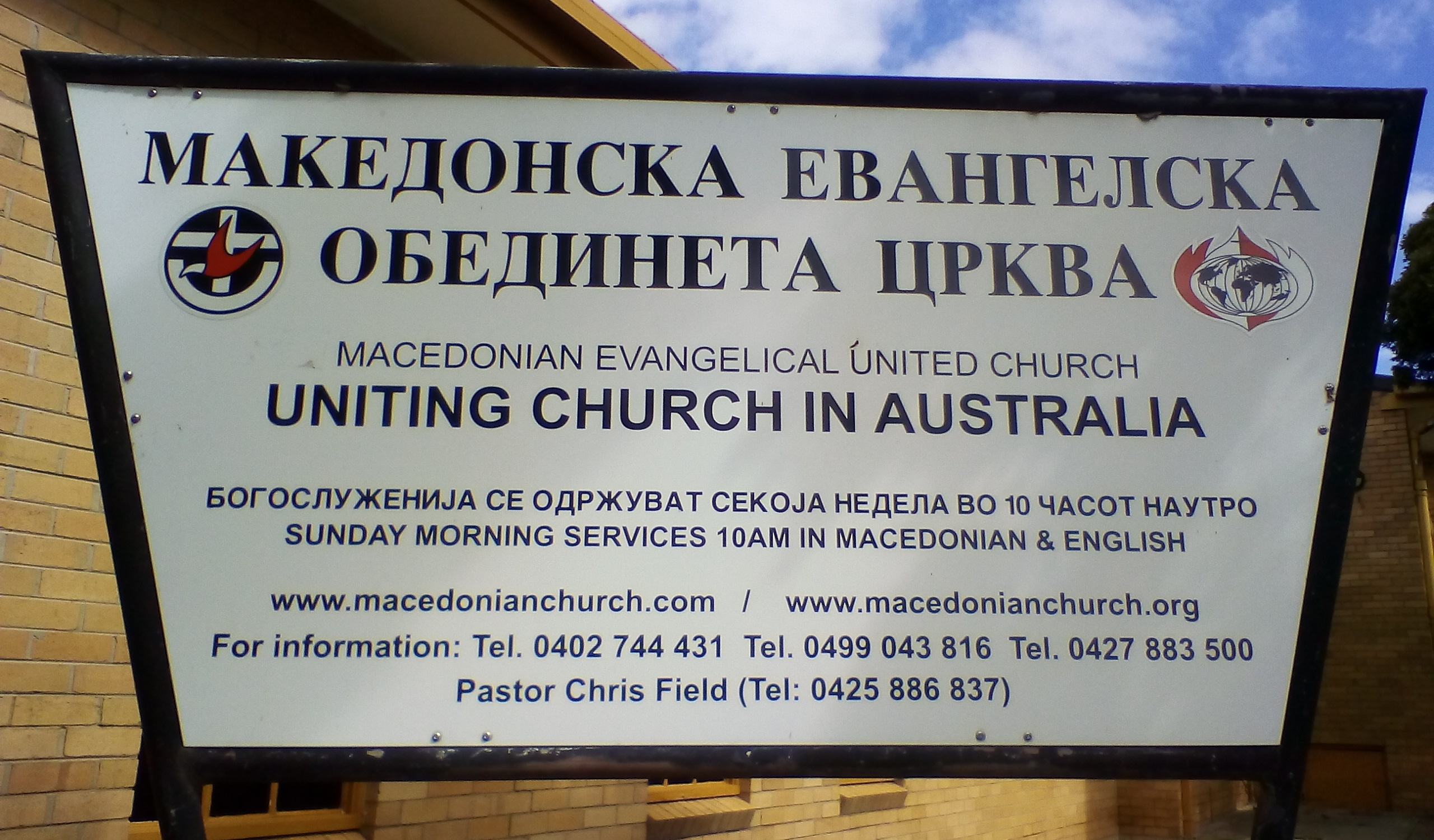
Church sign (front)

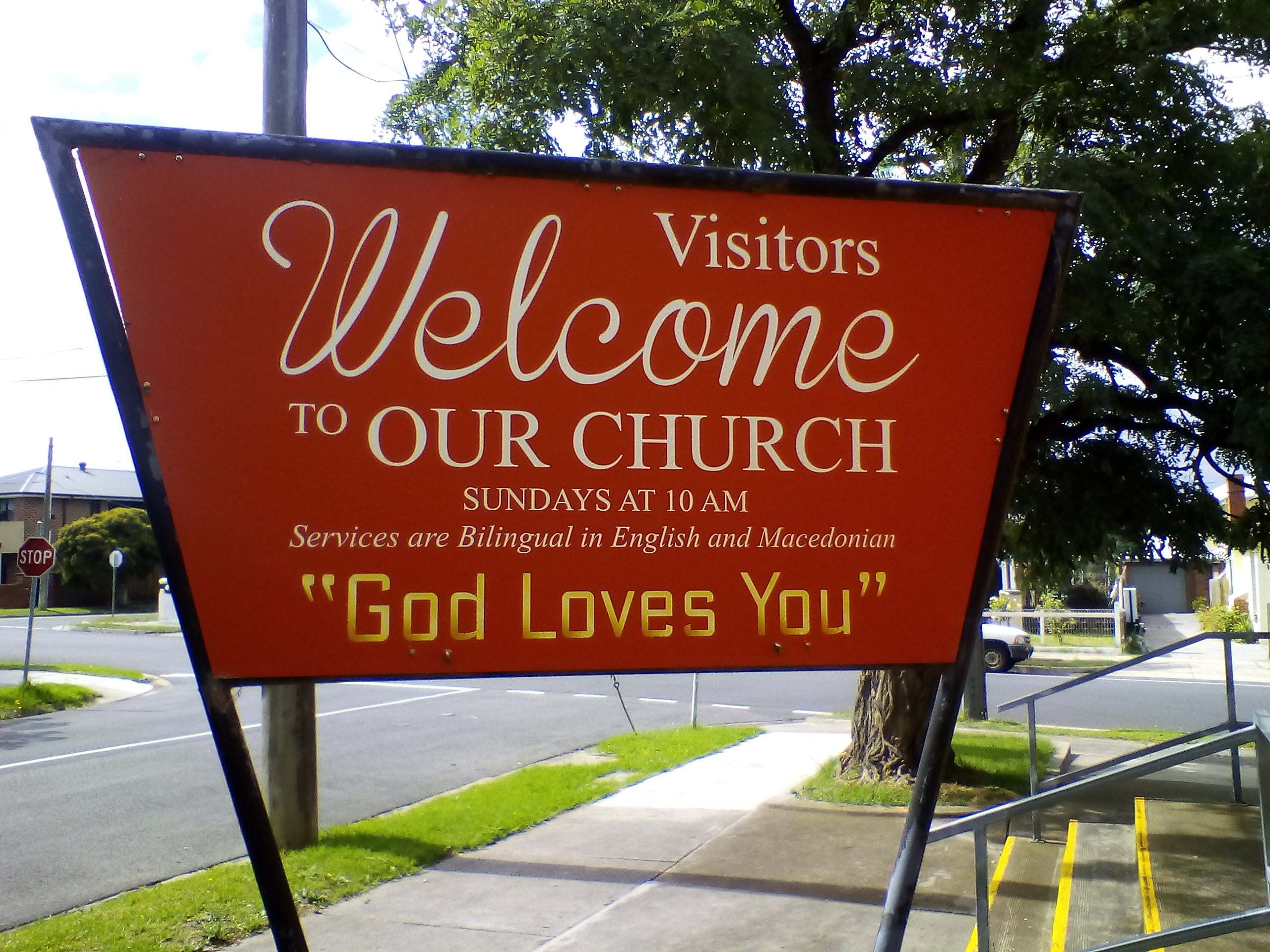
Church sign (back)

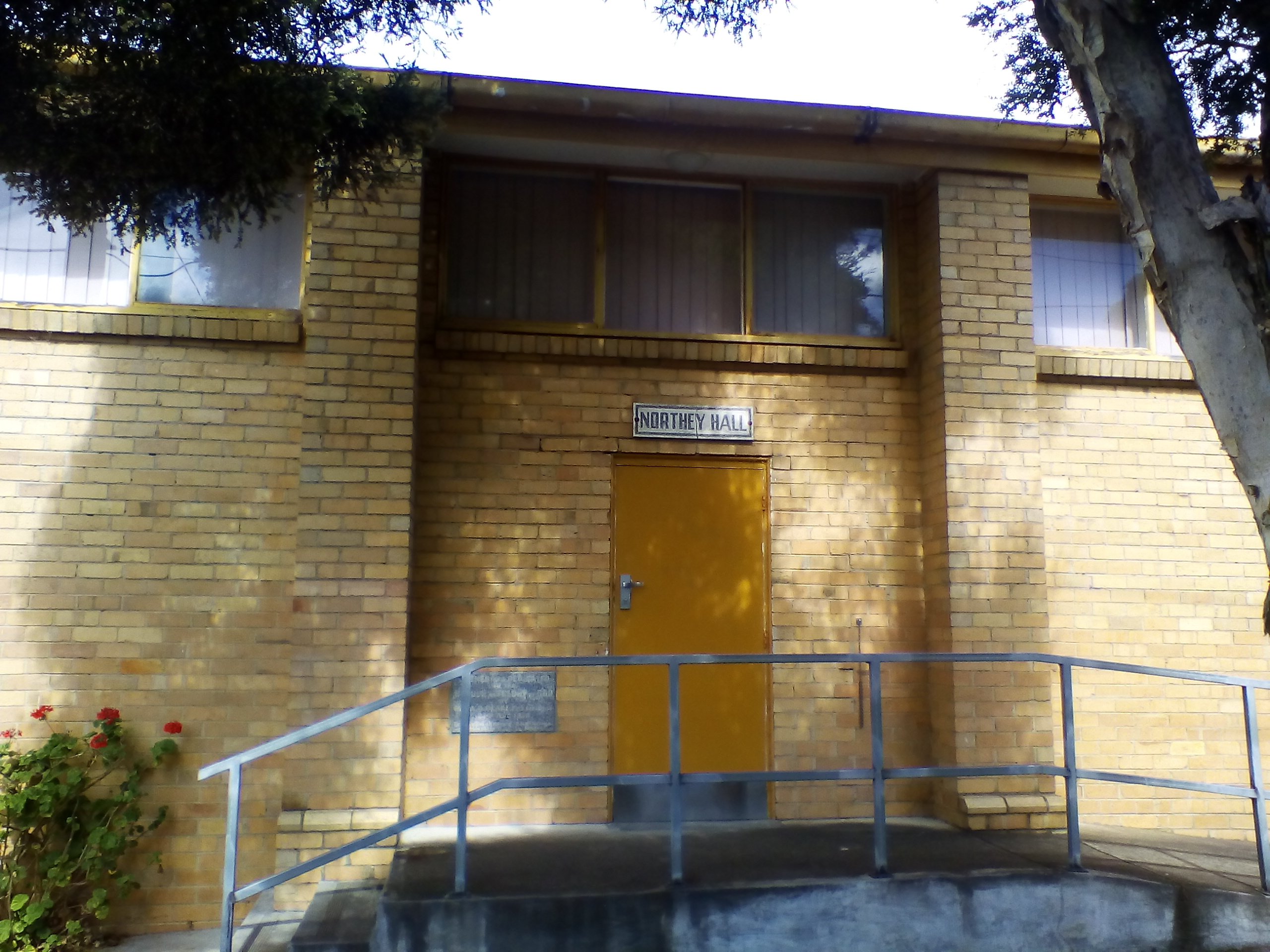
Church hall

== See also ==
- Macedonian Australians
- Protestantism in North Macedonia
