= Macedonian-Australian People's League =

- Македонско-австралиски народен сојуз
- Delegation at the First Conference of the Macedonian-Australian People's League, 25 August 1946
- Abbreviation: MAPL
- Established: August 1946
- Founded at: Perth, Australia
- Dissolved: 1958
- Main organ: Macedonian Spark

The Macedonian-Australian People's League (Macedonian: Македонско-австралиски народен сојуз, romanized: Makedonsko-avstraliski naroden sojuz; MAPL) was a leftist Macedonian Australian organisation which operated from 1946 to 1958. The organisation had branches open in every major Macedonian settlement in Australia.

== History ==
The organisation was established in August 1946 in Perth, Australia. It was initially named "Macedonian People's League" and then named "Macedonian-Australian People's League". In 1947, MAPL moved its headquarters to Sydney, regarding Perth as geographically unsuitable. As a leftist organisation, it supported the Federal People's Republic of Yugoslavia, and the People's Republic of Macedonia. Its members sponsored a hospital in Skopje to help the refugees of the Greek Civil War. In the early 1950s, the leaders of the organisation began discussing plans for the establishment of a church for the Macedonian community in Melbourne. In 1956, the Macedonian Orthodox Community of Melbourne and Victoria was formed, which also established a church. In 1957, the organisation decided to decentralise. Due to internal divisions, the organisation ceased its activity in 1958.

== Makedonska Iskra ==
Masthead of the newspaper Macedonian Spark

"Macedonian Spark" (Macedonian: Македонска Искра, romanized: Makedonska Iskra) was the first national Macedonian newspaper in Australia. The newspaper was the organ of the MAPL. It was published from 1946 to 1956, initially in Perth and then Melbourne. There was a disagreement between the members over what language the newspaper should be published in, with options being Bulgarian, Macedonian, or English. At the Second Conference in 1948, members decided to publish the newspaper in Macedonian through a vote. The newspaper was printed in the Latin alphabet. Its articles were not in standard Macedonian but in local Slavic dialects of Greece. Some of the Slavic texts were in mixed Bulgaro-Macedonian language or were written in Bulgarian language.

== See also ==
- Macedonian Australians
- Macedonian Patriotic Organization
- Macedonian diaspora
