= Union of the Baptist Christians in North Macedonia =

Fellowship in North Macedonia

The Union of the Baptist Christians in North Macedonia is a fellowship of Baptist churches in North Macedonia. It is affiliated with the European Baptist Federation and the Baptist World Alliance.

== History ==
The Convention has its origins in the establishment of the first Baptist Church in 1928. The Union of Baptist Christians was organized in 1991.

According to a census published by the association in 2023, it claimed 100 members and 3 churches.
