= List of Eastern Orthodox churches in Australia =

Eastern Orthodox church buildings in Australia include:

== Canonical Orthodox Churches ==
=== Greek Orthodox Church (Ecumenical Patriarchate of Constantinople) ===
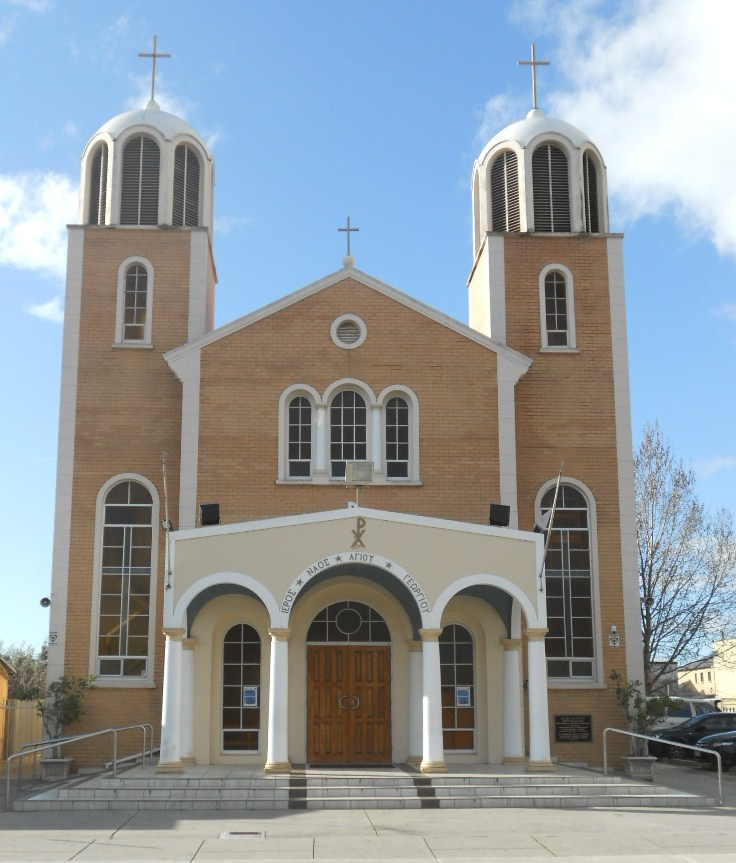
Greek Orthodox Church of St. George, Adelaide

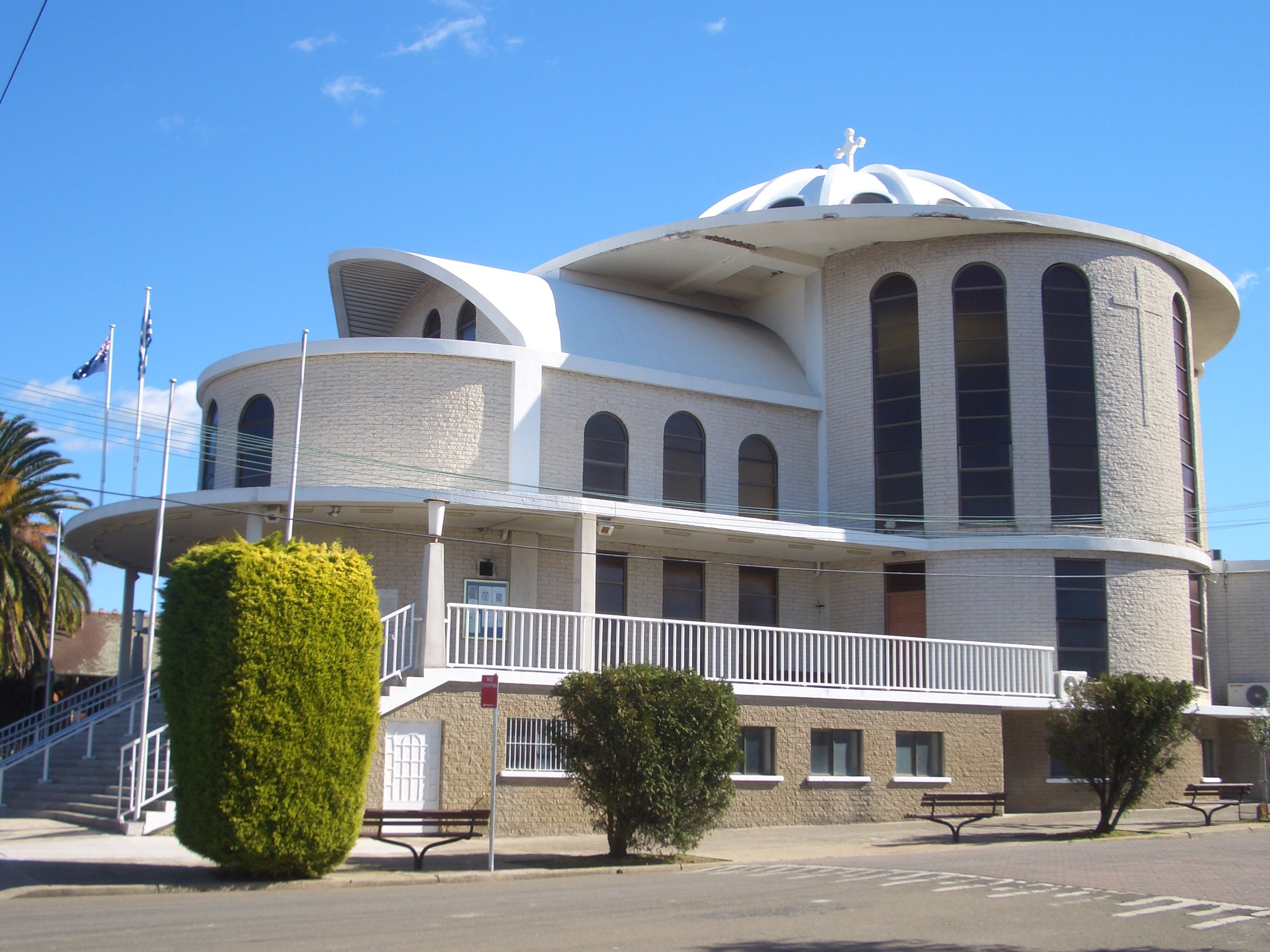
All Saints Greek Orthodox Church, Belmore

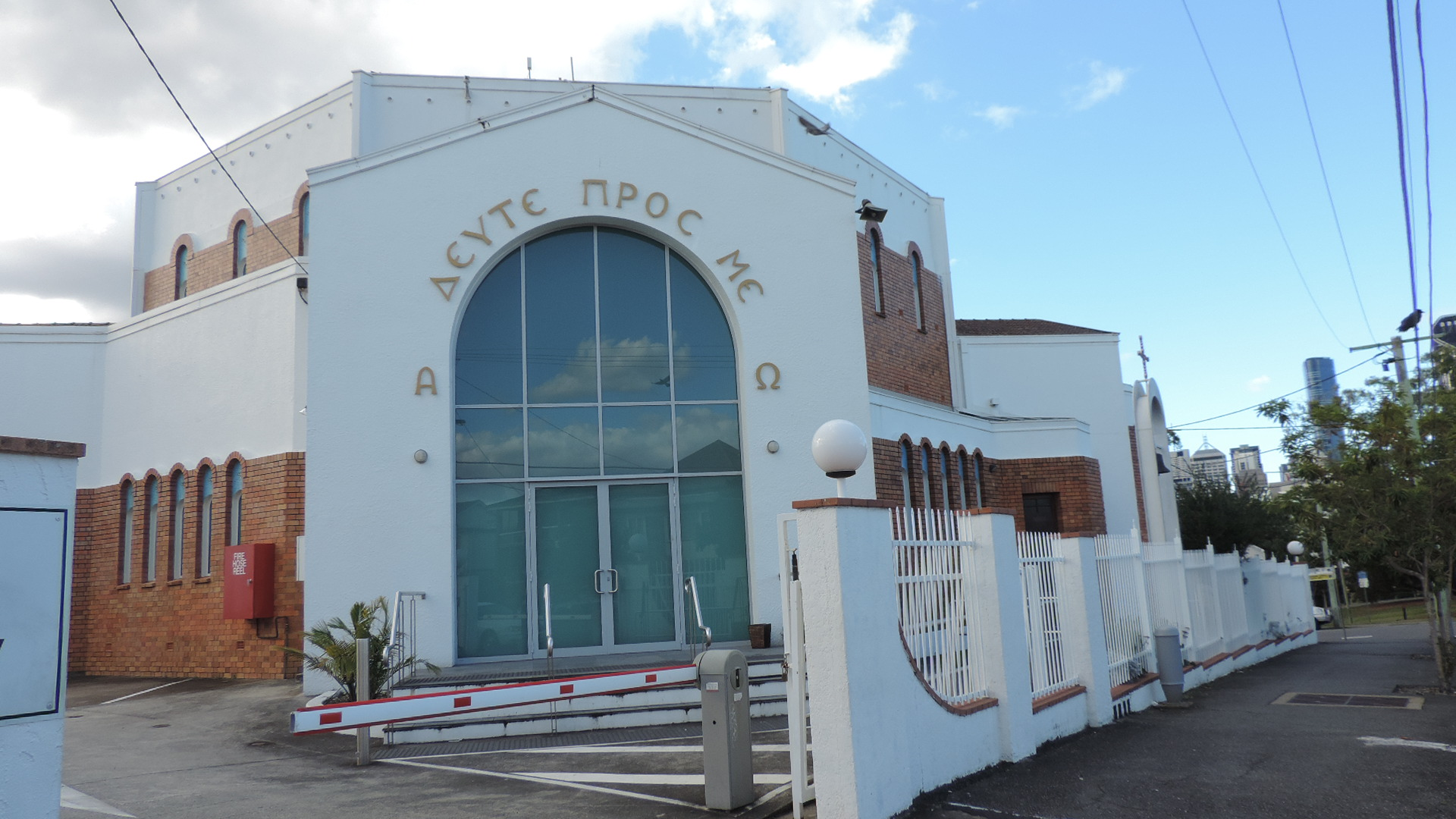
St George's Greek Orthodox Church, South Brisbane

Greek Orthodox Archdiocese of Australia is served by the Archbishop Makarios who was elected on May 9, 2019, by the Holy and Sacred Synod of the Ecumenical Patriarchate.

Greek Orthodox churches in Australia include:

==== Australian Capital Territory ====
- St Nicholas - Kingston

==== New South Wales ====
- Cathedral of the Annunciation of Our Lady - Redfern
- The Archangels - Albury
- St Savvas of Kalymnos - Banksia
- St Euphemia - Bankstown
- St John the Forerunner & Baptist - Batemans Bay
- All Saints - Belmore
- St Paraskevi & St Barbara - Blacktown
- St Nectarios - Burwood
- St Dionysios - Central Mangrove
- St Michael - Crows Nest
- The Dormition of Our Lady - Darlington
- The Lady of the Myrtles - Dubbo
- The Transfiguration of our Lord - Earlwood
- St Andrew - Gladesville
- St Panteleimon - Goulburn
- St Stylianos, Sts Peter & Paul & St Gregory of Palama - Gymea
- The Holy Apostles - Hamilton
- St Stephanos - Hurlstone Park
- St Basil the Great & St George - Islington (Ukrainian-speaking)
- St Spyridon - Kingsford
- The Resurrection of our Lord, Our Lady of the Myrtles, St. Elessa - Kogarah
- St Gerasimos - Leichhardt
- St Raphael, Nicholas & Irene - Liverpool
- St Nicholas - Marrickville
- St Catherine - Mascot
- Sts Constantine & Helen - Newtown
- St John the Forerunner & Baptist - Old Erowal Bay
- St Catherine - Orange
- St Sophia - Paddington
- St John the Forerunner - Parramatta
- St Dimitrios - Queanbeyan
- St Athanasios - Rookwood
- St George - Rose Bay
- St Demetrios - St Marys
- The Holy Trinity - Surry Hills
- St Sophia & Three Daughters - Surry Hills
- St Demetrios - Tamworth
- St Therapon - Thornleigh
- St Haralambos - Tuggerah
- The Dormition of Our Lady - Wagga Wagga
- Holy Cross - Wollongong
- St Nektarios - Wollongong
- Holy Monastery of Panagia Pantanassa - Mangrove Creek
- Holy Monastery of the Holy Cross - Mangrove Mountain
- Holy Monastery of St George - Yellow Rock

==== Victoria ====
- St Eustathios - South Melbourne
- The Dormition of Our Lady - Altona North
- Our Lady The Merciful - Bacchus Marsh
- St Nicholas - Ballarat
- The Dormition Our Lady - Bell Park
- Sts Raphael, Nicholas & Irene - Bentleigh
- Holy Cross - Box Hill
- St Eleftherios - Brunswick
- St Vasilios - Brunswick
- The Resurrection of St Lazarus - Bunurong
- The Three Hierarchs - Clayton
- St Spyridon - Clayton South
- The Presentation Our Lord - Coburg
- St Panteleimon - Dandenong
- St Catherine - East Malvern
- The Annunciation of Our Lady - East Melbourne
- St Nektarios - Fawkner
- Holy Trinity - Footscray
- St Andrew - Forest Hill
- Theofania - Frankstown
- The Dormition Our Lady - Iron Bark-Bendigo
- Panagia Soumela - Keilor East
- The Annunciation Our Lady - Mildura
- St Demetrios - Moonee Ponds
- The Dormition Our Lady - Morwell
- The Presentation Our Lady to the Temple - Balwyn North
- St John The Forerunner & Baptist - Carlton North
- Sts Anargiri - Oakleigh
- Archangels - Parkdale
- St Demetrios - Prahran
- Sts Cyril & Methodius - Preston
- The Holy Trinity - Richmond
- St George - Robinvale
- St George - Shepparton
- Sts Constantine & Helen - South Yarra
- St Athanasios - Springvale
- St Paraskevi, St John The Merciful & St Barbara - St Albans
- St Andrew - Sunshine West
- St Anthony - Sunshine West
- St Haralambos - Templestowe
- The Transfiguration Our Lord - Thomastown
- St George - Thornbury
- Our Lady of the Myrtles - Wangaratta
- St Nicholas - Yarraville
- Holy Monastery of Panagia Gorgoepikoss - Lovely Banks
- Holy Monastery of Axion Estin - Northcote
- Holy Monastery of Panagia Kamariani - Red Hill

==== Queensland ====
- St George - South Brisbane
- St Anna - Bundall - Gold Coast
- St Stephen - Home Hill
- The Dormition of Our Lady - Innisfail
- The Dormition of Our Lady - Mount Gravatt
- St John the Forerunner & Baptist - Redlynch
- St Nektarios - Rockhampton
- Sts Paraskevi - Taigum
- St Nicholas - Toowoomba
- St Theodores - Townsville
- Greek Orthodox Parish of the Sunshine Coast - Mooloolaba

==== South Australia ====
- St Sophia (Holy Wisdom of God) - Bowden
- Sts Raphael, Nicholas & Irene - Athelstone
- The Dormition of Our Lady - Berri
- St Demetrios - Berri North
- St Andrew - Christie Downs
- St Nicholas - Coober Pedy
- Holy Cross - Glenelg North
- St Panteleimon - Glenelg North
- St Sophrony - Hectorville
- Prophet Elias - Norwood
- The Nativity of Christ - Port Adelaide
- St John - Port Augusta
- St George - Port Pirie
- St Anthony - Prospect
- Sts Constantine & Helen - Renmark
- St Demetrios - Salisbury Plain
- St George - Thebarton
- St Nicholas - Thevenard
- St Spyridon - Unley
- St Nicholas - Wallaroo
- St Constantine & Helen - Whyalla Playford
- Holy Monastery of Saint Nectarios, Croydon Park

==== Western Australia ====
- St Nektarios - Dianella
- Pantocrator - Churchlands
- St Nicholas - East Bunbury
- St Paisios - Forrestfield
- Archangels Michael & Gabriel - Geraldton
- Sts Constantine & Helen - Northbridge
- The Annunciation of Our Lady - West Perth
- Holy Monastery of St John, Forrestfield

==== Tasmania ====
- Holy Trinity - Hobart
- The Dormition of Our Lady - Launceston
- St George - South Hobart

==== Northern Territory ====
- St Nicholas - Darwin
- St Savvas - Palmerston

=== Antiochian Orthodox Archdiocese of Australia (Greek Orthodox Patriarchate of Antioch) ===
The Antiochian Orthodox Archdiocese of Australia is served by Metropolitan Basilios who was elected on December 16, 2017, at the Cathedral of St. George in Redfern, Sydney.

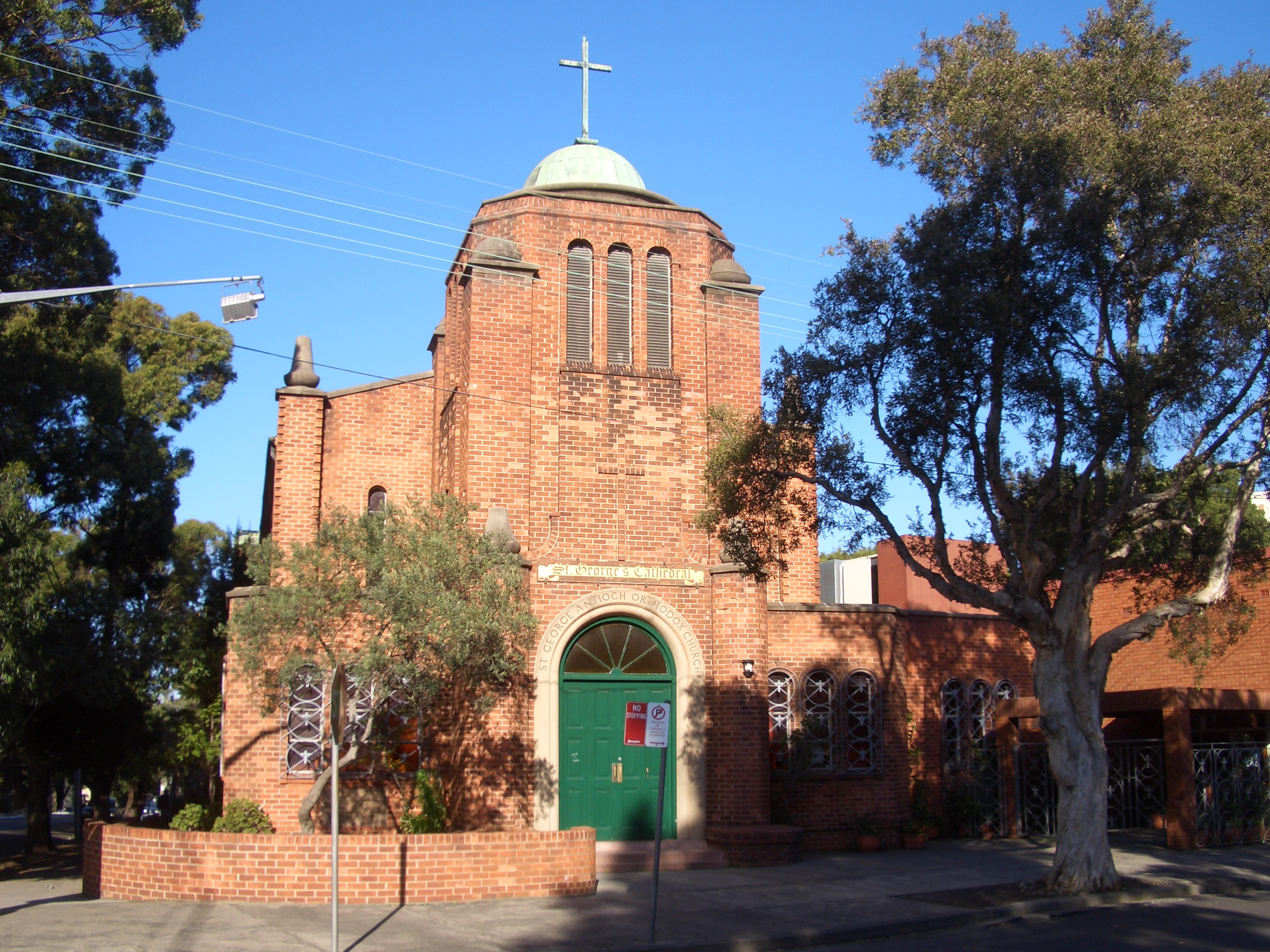
St George Antioch Orthodox Church, Redfern, Sydney

Antiochian Churches in Australia include:

==== New South Wales ====
- St George Cathedral, Redfern
- St Nicholas, Bankstown
- St John the Baptist, Croydon Park
- Sts Peter and Paul, Doonside
- St Michael's Monastery, Antiochian Village, Goulburn
- St Michael, Kirrawee
- St Mary's, Mays Hill
- St Mary's, Mount Pritchard
- St Nicholas, Punchbowl
- Sts Michael & Gabriel, Ryde
- St Elias the Prophet, Wollongong

==== Victoria ====
- Transfiguration of Our Lord Mission, Belgrave South
- Good Shepherd Mission, Clayton
- St Ignatius, Darraweit Guim
- St Paul, Dandenong
- St Nicholas, East Melbourne
- St George, Thornbury
- St Mary, Yarraville

==== Queensland ====
- St Mary Magdalene, Elimbah
- St Paul, Woolloongabba

==== South Australia ====
- St. Elias, West Croydon

=== Moscow Patriarchate ===
==== Russian Orthodox Church Outside of Russia ====
The Russian Diocese of Australia and New Zealand is served by Archbishop George of Sydney, Australia and New Zealand.

Churches in Australia include:

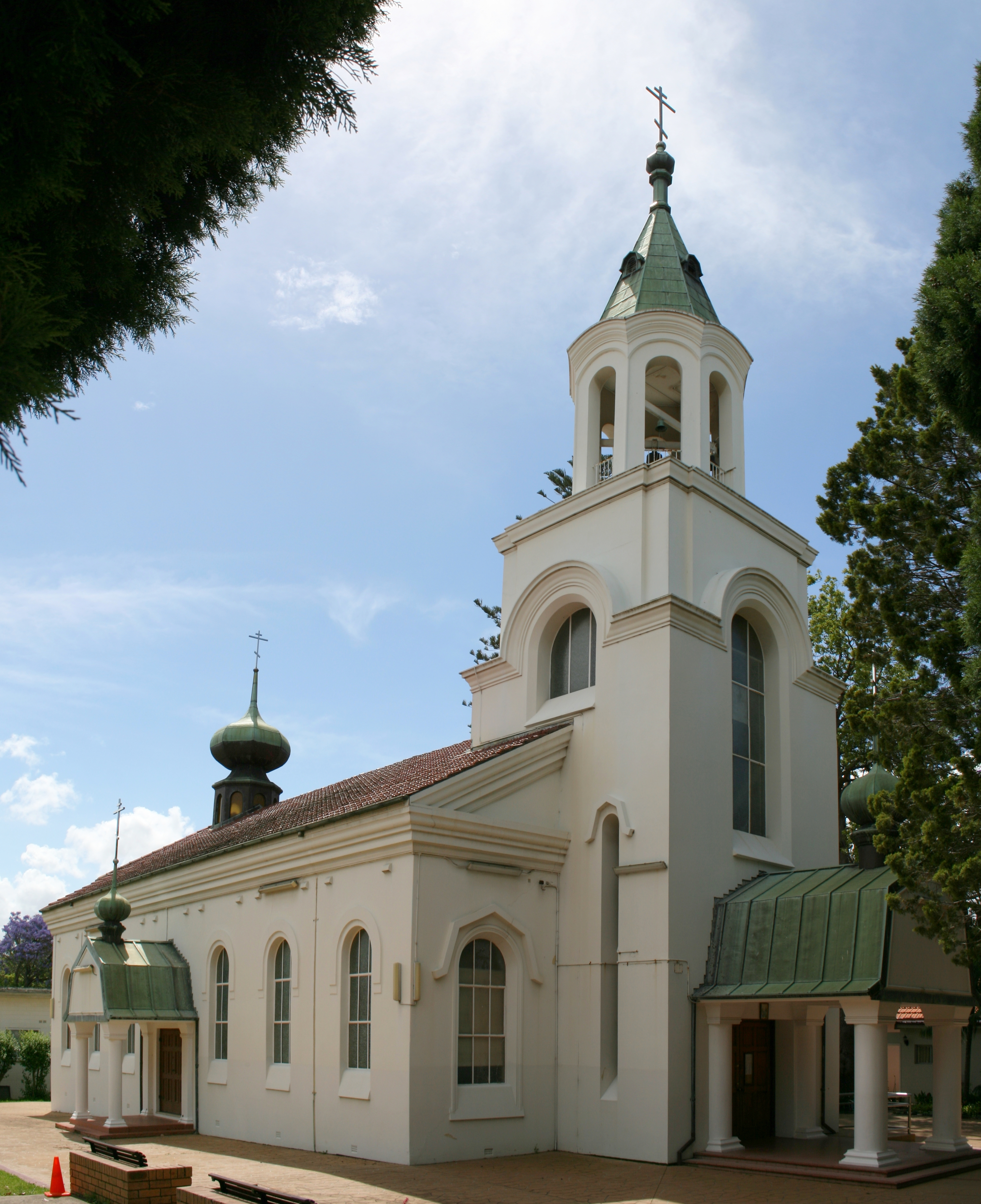
Cathedral of Saints Peter and Paul, Strathfield, New South Wales

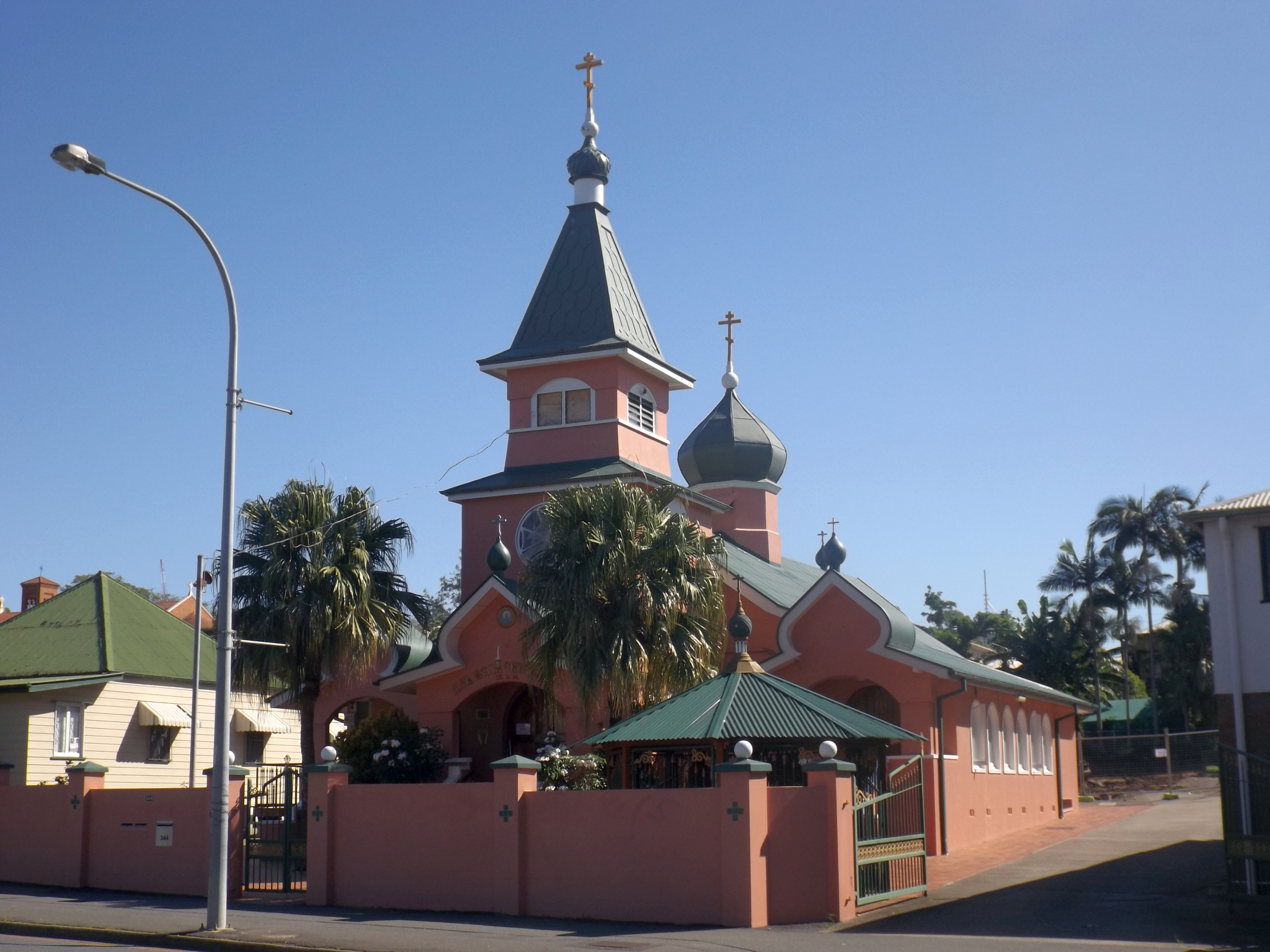
St Nicholas' Cathedral, Brisbane, Queensland

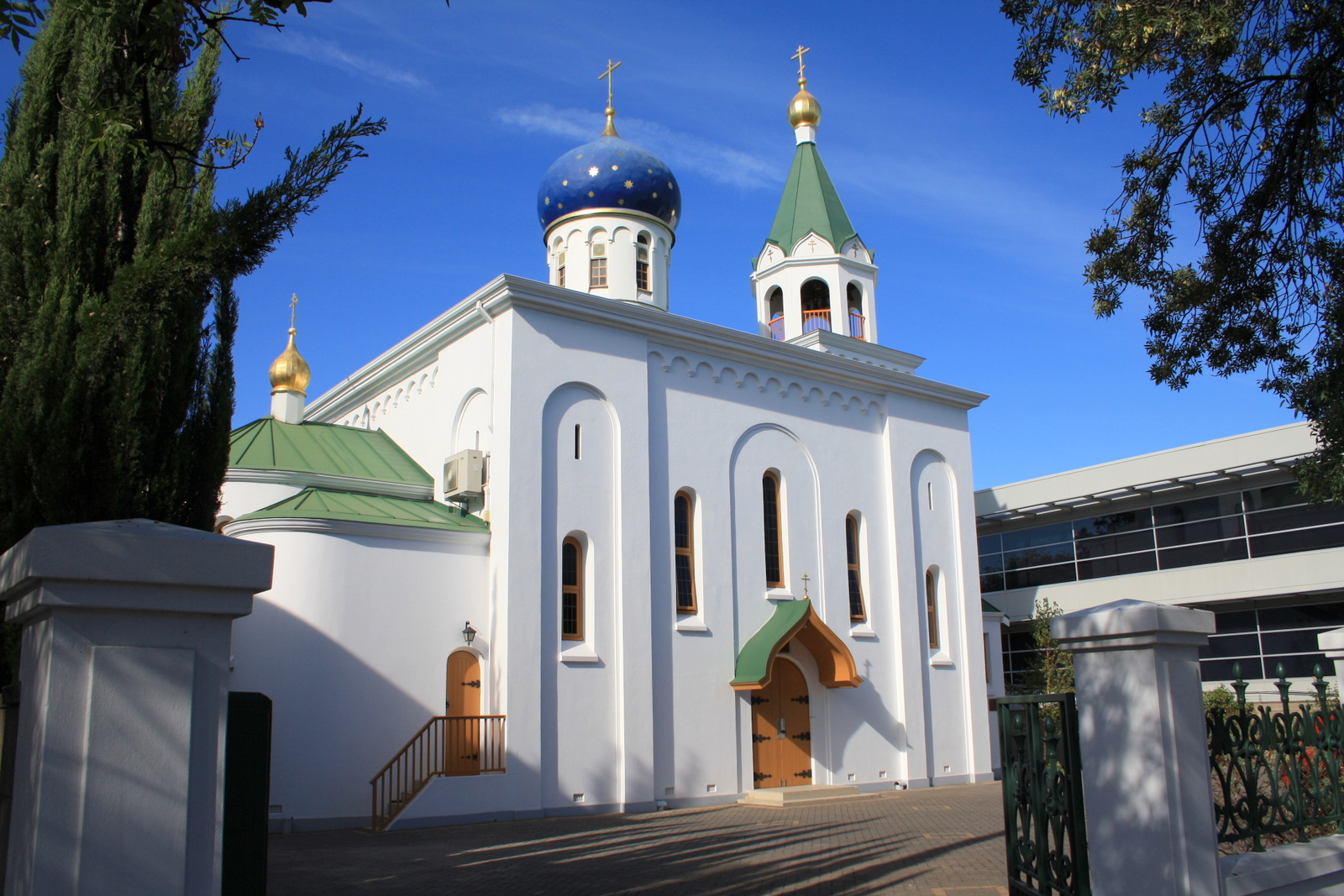
St Nicholas' Church, Wayville, South Australia

===== Australian Capital Territory =====
- St John the Forerunner Church – Canberra

===== Western Australia =====
- Sts Peter and Paul Church – Bayswater
- St Mary's Orthodox Church – Dardanup

===== New South Wales =====
- Saints Peter and Paul Russian Orthodox Cathedral, Strathfield
- Archangel Michael Church – Blacktown
- Holy Transfiguration Monastery – Bombala
- Presentation of the Mother of God Convent – Bungarby
- Protection of the Holy Virgin Church – Cabramatta
- St George Church – Carlton
- St Vladimir Church – Centennial Park
- Church of All Russian Saints – Croydon
- St Nicholas' Church – Fairfield
- Our Lady of Kazan Convent – Kentlyn
- St John the Baptist Skete – Kentlyn
- Orthodox Monastery of the Archangel Michael – Marrickville
- Sts Cyril and Methodius Community and St Xenia Church – Tweed Heads
- St Nicholas' Church – Wallsend
- St Panteleimon Church – West Gosford
- Holy Dormition Church – Wollongong

===== Victoria =====
- Holy Virgin Protection (Pokrov) Cathedral – East Brunswick
- Holy Fathers Community – Allansford
- Church of Icon of the Joy of All Who Sorrow – Bell Park (Geelong)
- Dormition of Our Lady – Dandenong
- St John of Kronstadt Chapel – Dandenong
- Holy Virgin Protection (Pokrov) Parish - South Yarra (Note: Pokrov Parish in South Yarra is no longer under the Greek Orthodox Archdiocese of Australia (Ecumenical Patriarchate of Constantinople), transferred to the ROCOR in July 2026.)

===== Queensland =====
- St Nicholas Cathedral – Brisbane
- Holy Annunciation – Woolloongabba
- St Seraphim – Woolloongabba
- Our Lady of Vladimir – Rocklea

===== South Australia =====
- Monastery of the Prophet Elias – Monarto South
- St Nicholas' – Wayville
- Saints Elizabeth and Barbara – Woodcroft

===== Tasmania =====
- Exaltation of the Holy Cross – Hobart

==== Russian Orthodox Patriarchal Parishes ====
- Protection of the Virgin Mary - Blacktown (Sydney)
- Holy Trinity - Oakleigh (Melbourne)

=== Romanian Orthodox Eparchy of Australia and New Zealand ===
The diocese is served by Bishop Mihail Filimon.

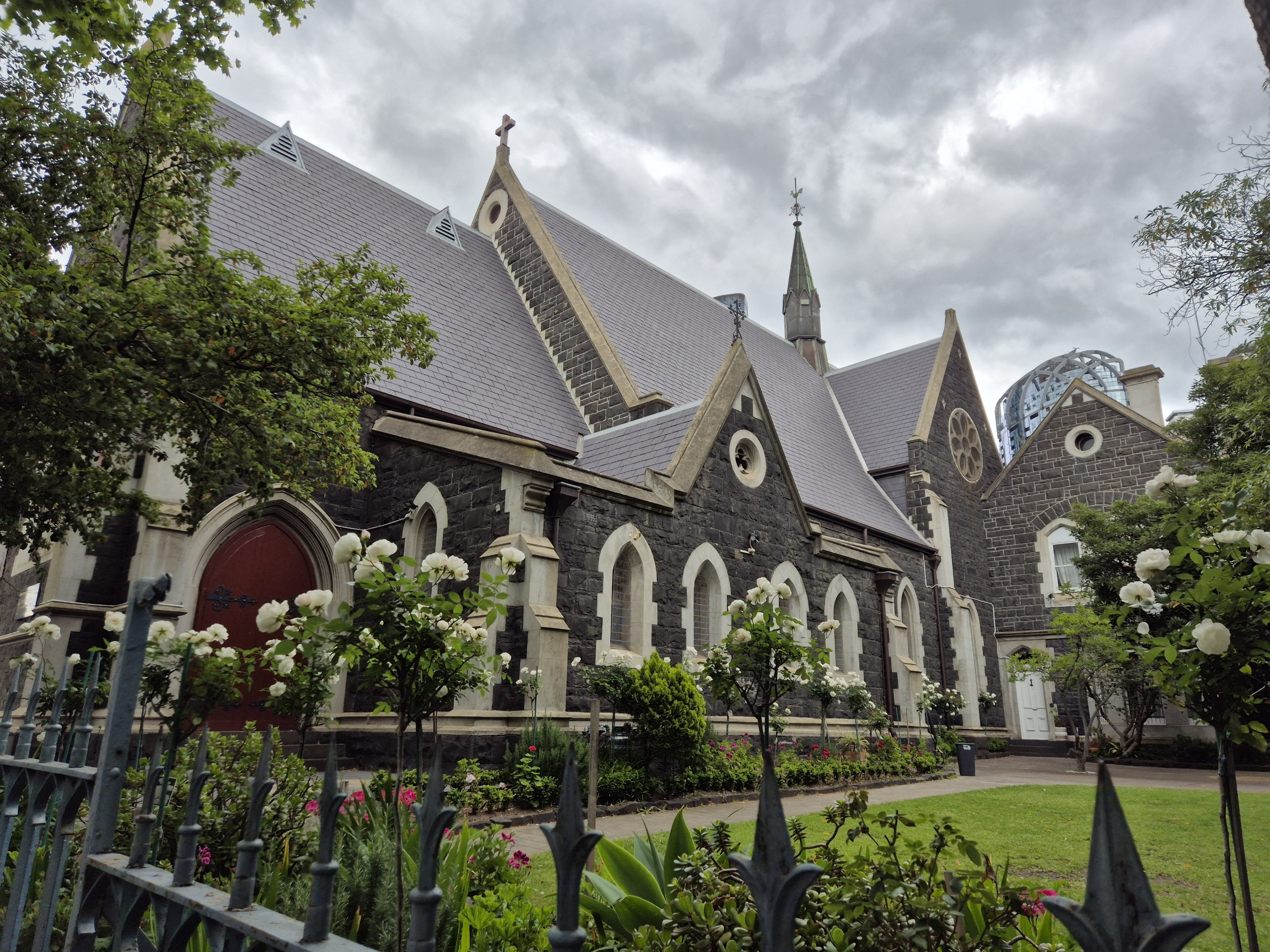
Romanian Orthodox Church, Carlton, Victoria

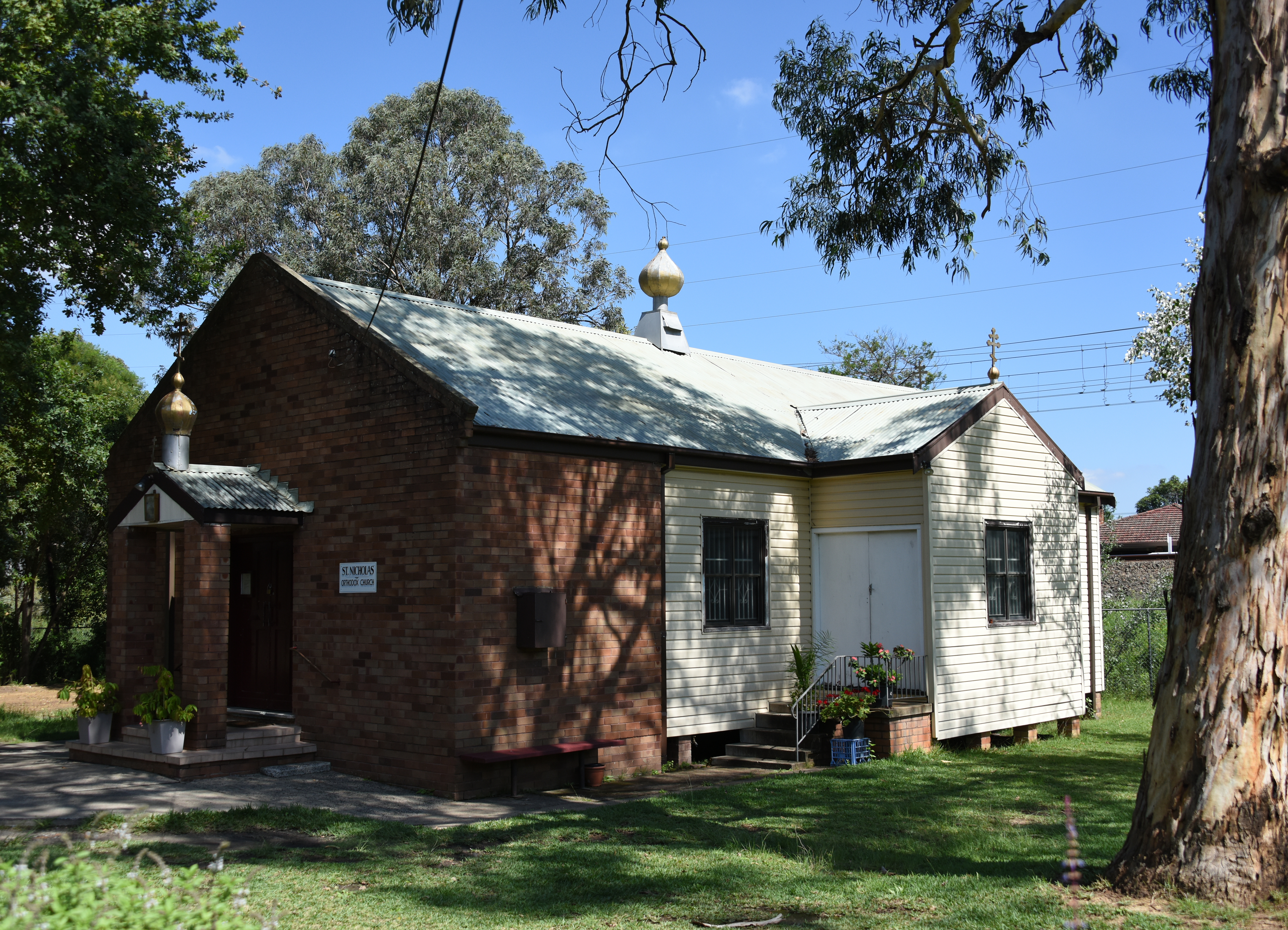
Romanian Orthodox Church, Bankstown, Sydney

Romanian Churches in Australia include:

- Holy Apostles Peter and Paul - Melbourne
- St. Mary's Parish - Sydney
- St. John the Baptist Parish - Sydney
- St. Gregory the Theologian Parish - Sydney
- Holy Brancoveni Martyrs Parish - Sydney
- Saint Nicholas Parish - Adelaide
- Saint Dumitru Parish - Brisbane
- St. Philip the Apostle Parish - Brisbane
- Holy Trinity Parish - Perth
- St. Thomas the Apostle Parish - Dandenong
- St. Andrew the Apostle Parish - Newcastle
- St. Spiridon Parish - Cairns
- St. Philotheus of Arges Parish - Bayswater
- Parish of the Three Holy Hierarchs - Canberra

=== Bulgarian Orthodox Diocese of the USA, Canada and Australia ===
Bulgarian Eastern Orthodox Diocese of the USA, Canada, and Australia is served by Metropolitan Joseph.

Bulgarian Churches in Australia include:

- Sts Cyril & Methodius Bulgarian Eastern Orthodox Cathedral - Melbourne
- St Petka Bulgarian Eastern Orthodox Church - Adelaide

=== Serbian Orthodox Metropolitanate of Australia and New Zealand ===
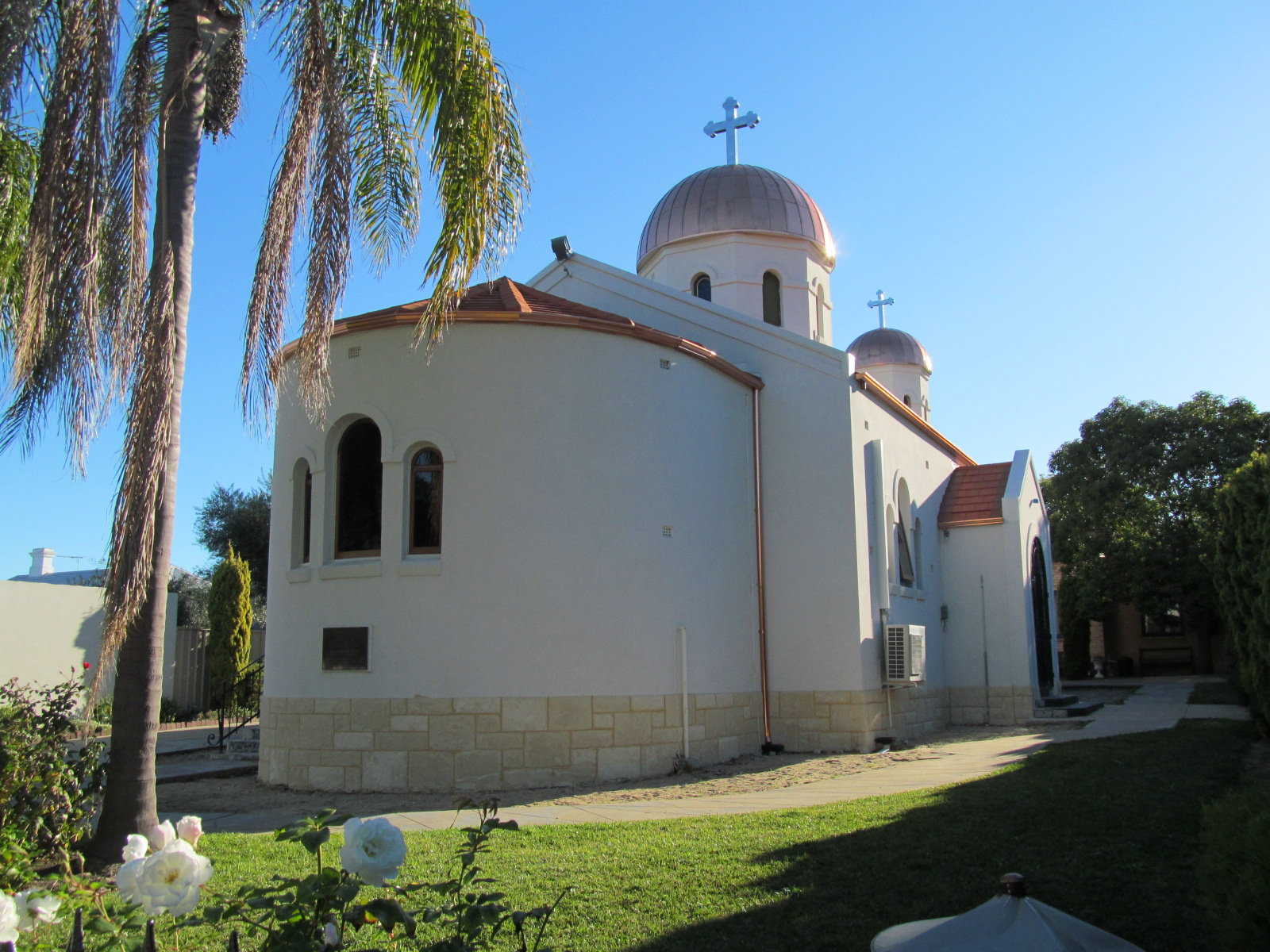
Church of St. Sava, Perth

The Serbian Orthodox Eparchy of Australia and New Zealand is led by Metropolitan Siluan Mrakić.

Serbian Churches in Australia include:

==== Australian Capital Territory ====
- St Sava Serbian Orthodox Church, Canberra
- St George Serbian Orthodox Parish, Canberra

==== New South Wales ====
- St Lazarus Serbian Orthodox Cathedral, Sydney
- St Sava Serbian Orthodox Pro-Cathedral, Ingleside
- St Nicholas Serbian Orthodox Church, Blacktown
- St George Serbian Orthodox Church, Cabramatta
- St Michael The Archangel Free Serbian Orthodox Church, Homebush
- St Sava Serbian Orthodox Church, Homebush West
- St Naum of Ohrid Serbian Orthodox Church, Newcastle
- St Stephen The Archdeacon Free Serbian Orthodox Church, Rooty Hill
- St John The Baptist Serbian Orthodox Church, Wollongong
- St John The Baptist, 2530 Dapto, Wollongong
- Synaxis of the Serbian Saints, Central Coast
- St George Serbian Orthodox Church, Lightning Ridge
- St Luke the Apostle Serbian Orthodox Church, Liverpool
- Sts Simeon and Ana Serbian Orthodox Parish, Moree (under planning)

==== Victoria ====
- Holy Trinity Serbian Orthodox Cathedral, Melbourne
- St Steven of Dechani Serbian Orthodox Parish, Carrum Downs
- St Nicholas Serbian Orthodox Church, Geelong
- St Sava Free Serbian Orthodox Church, Greensborough
- St Stephen the Archdeacon Serbian Orthodox Church, Keysborough
- St Petka Serbian Orthodox Church, Rockbank
- St George Serbian Orthodox Church, St Albans
- Sts Peter And Paul Serbian Orthodox Church, Wodonga
- Holy Trinity Serbian Orthodox Church, Yallourn North
- St Ignatius of Antioch and St Aidan Of Lindisfarne Orthodox Church, Ballarat
- St Basil of Ostrog Serbian Orthodox Church, Langwarrin

==== Queensland ====
- St Nicholas Serbian Orthodox Church, Brisbane – Wacol
- St Nicholas Serbian Orthodox Church, Brisbane – Woolloongabba
- Dormition of the Most Holy Theotokos, Gold Coast
- St Nicholas Serbian Orthodox Parish, South Brisbane
- St Elijah the Prophet Serbian Orthodox Parish, Cairns

==== South Australia ====
- St Sava Serbian Orthodox Parish, Adelaide – Hindmarsh
- St Sava Serbian Orthodox Church, Adelaide – Woodville Park
- St Elijah the Prophet Serbian Orthodox Church - Coober Pedy

==== Western Australia ====
- Holy Trinity Serbian Orthodox Church, Perth
- St Sava Serbian Orthodox Church, Perth
- St Basil of Ostrog Serbian Orthodox Parish, North Perth
- St Basil of Ostrog Serbian Orthodox Parish, Rockingham

==== Tasmania ====
- Holy Cross Serbian Orthodox Parish, Hobart

==== Northern Territory ====
- St Sava Serbian Orthodox Church, Darwin

=== Macedonian Orthodox Church ===
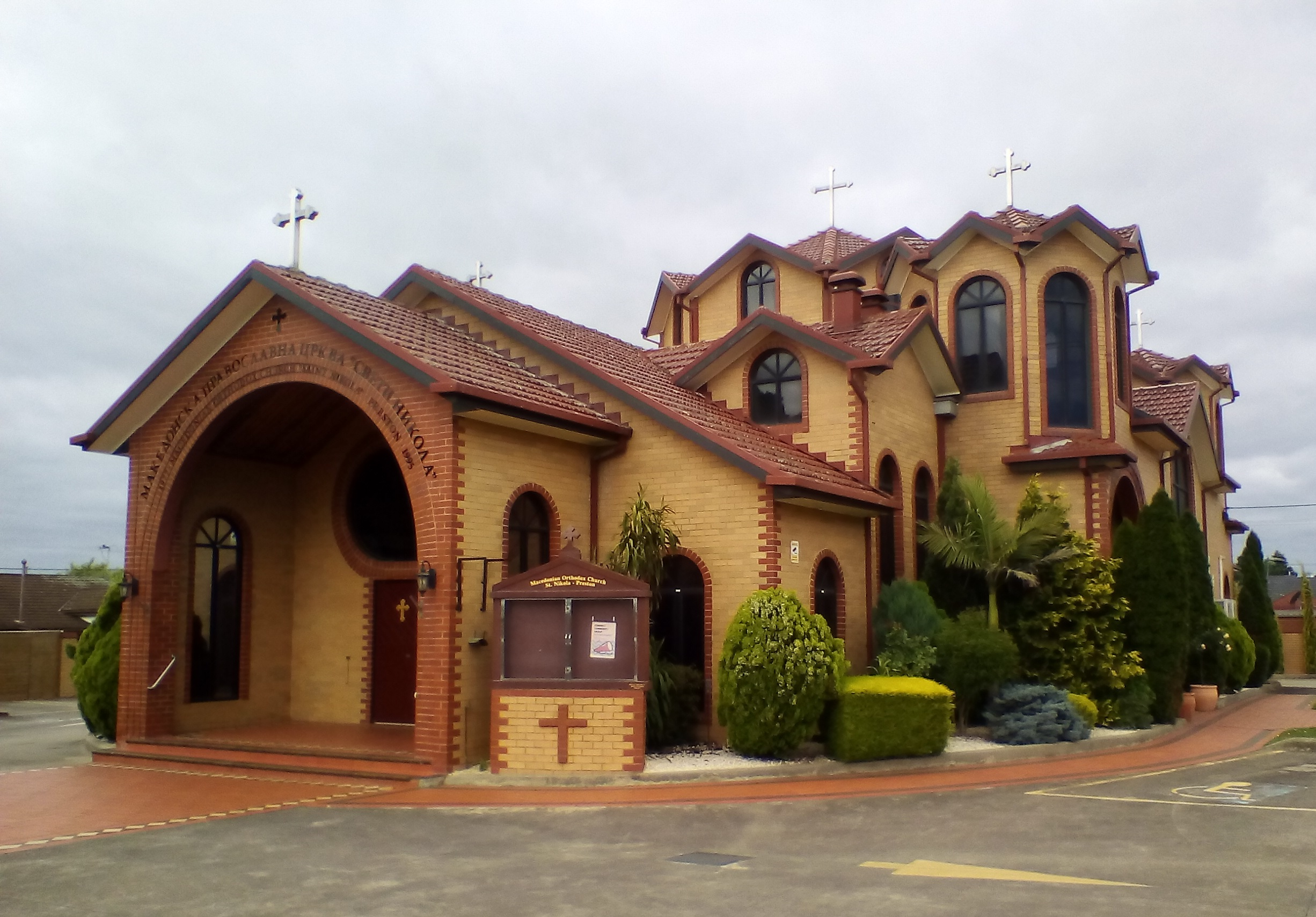
St. Nikola Macedonian Orthodox Church in Preston, Victoria

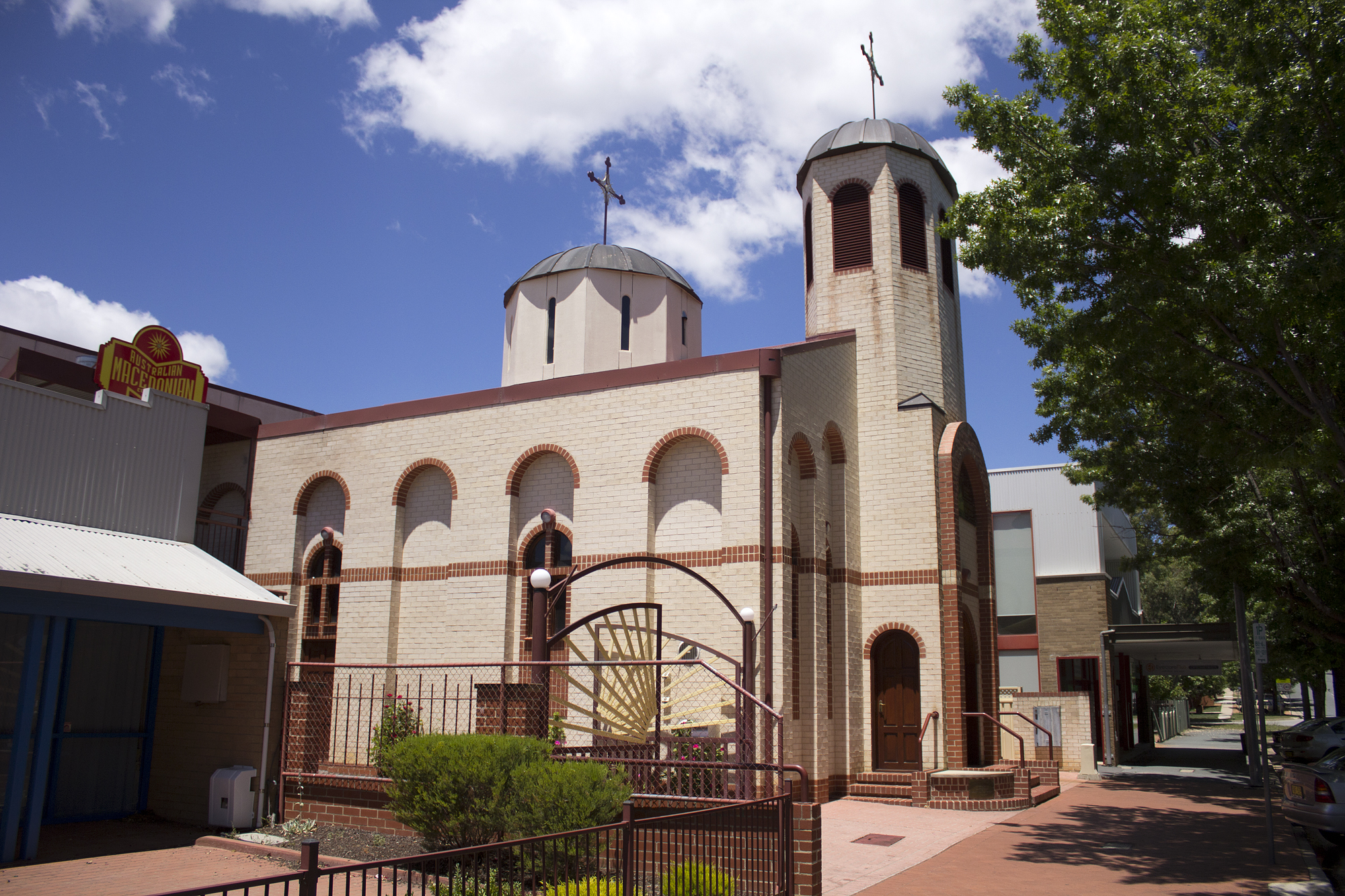
Saint Prophet Ilija Macedonian Orthodox Church in Queanbeyan

=== Diocese of Australia and New Zealand ===
The Macedonian Orthodox Diocese of Australia and New Zealand, one of two canonical Macedonian Orthodox jurisdictions in Australia, is led by Metropolitan Nikola Trajkovski.

Parishes in this Diocese include:

==== Victoria ====
- Dormition of the Mother of God Cathedral - Sydenham
- Saint Nicholas – Preston
- Saint Prophet Elias – Footscray
- Saint Parasceva – Mill Park
- Saint Demetrius of Solun – Springvale
- Saint Zlata of Meglen – Werribee

==== New South Wales ====
- Holy Mother of God – Liverpool
- Holy Trinity – Sutherland
- Saint Clement of Ohrid – Port Kembla

==== Western Australia ====
- Saint Nicholas – Perth

==== South Australia ====
- Synaxis of the Most Holy Mother of God – Adelaide

==== Queensland ====
- Dormition of the Most Holy Mother of God – Brisbane

=== Diocese of Australia and Sydney ===
The Macedonian Diocese of Australia and Sydney is a canonical Macedonian Orthodox jurisdiction, currently administrated by Archbishop Stefan of Ohrid and Macedonia.

Parishes in this Diocese include:

==== Victoria ====
- Church of the Assumption of the Blessed Virgin Mary - Sydenham, Melbourne
- Church of St. George and the Blessed Virgin - Epping, Melbourne
- St. Clement of Ohrid Monastery - King Lake, Melbourne
- St. John the Baptist Church - Geelong

==== New South Wales ====
- St Nicholas Church - Cabramatta, Sydney
- St. Demetrios Church - Wollongong, Sydney
- St. Petka Church - Rockdale, Sydney
- St. Elias Church - Queanbeyan
- St. Mary Church - Broadmeadow, Newcastle

==== Australian Capital Territory ====
- St. Clement of Ohrid Church - Canberra

==== Western Australia ====
- St. Nicholas Church - Perth

==== South Australia ====
- St. Naum of Ohrid Church - Adelaide

==== Queensland ====
- Holy Resurrection Church - Gold Coast

== Unrecognised churches ==
=== Russian Orthodox Church Abroad ===
The Diocese is served by Bishop Andrei, Bishop of Yarraville and Australia and New Zealand.

Russian Orthodox Church Abroad churches include:

- Monastery of St. Theognius
- Church of the Holy Martyrs Of Vilnius
- Cathedral of our Lady Of Kazan
- Church of Holy Archangel Michael
- Church of the Iveron Icon of the Mother Of God
- Church of the Vladimir Icon of the Mother Of God

=== Ukrainian Autocephalic Orthodox Church ===
The Ukrainian Autocephalic Orthodox Church of Australia and New Zealand is led by Metropolitan Anthony.

Parishes in this Diocese include:

- Parish of St. Nicholas the Wonderworker - Canberra
- Parish of the Intercession of the Blessed Virgin - New South Wales
- St Aphanasius, Granville - New South Wales
- Parish of Intercession of The Holy Virgin - Victoria
- Parish of the Assumption of the Blessed Virgin - Victoria
- Parish of the Nativity of the Blessed Virgin - Bell Park (Geelong), Victoria
- Parish of St. Nicholas the Wonderworker - Western Australia
- Parish of St. Nicholas the Wonderworker - Queensland
- Church of Sts Peter and Paul - South Australia

=== Autocephalous Greek Orthodox Church of America and Australia ===
==== Greek Orthodox Community of South Australia Inc. ====
- Greek Orthodox Cathedral of the Archangels Michael & Gabriel, Adelaide SA
- Greek Orthodox Church of the Dormition of the Theotokos, Croydon SA
- Greek Orthodox Church of Sts Constantine & Helen, Goodwood SA
- Greek Orthodox Chapel of Sts Cosmas & Damianos, Ridleyton SA
- Greek Orthodox Church of St Nicholas, Thebarton SA
- Greek Orthodox Chapel of the Holy Virgin, Two Wells SA

==== Greek Orthodox Community of Newcastle Inc. ====
- Greek Orthodox Church of St Demetrios, Hamilton East (Newcastle) NSW

==== Greek Orthodox Community of St Albans Vic. ====
Greek Orthodox Church of St Paraskevi, St Albans VIC

=== Genuine Orthodox Church ===
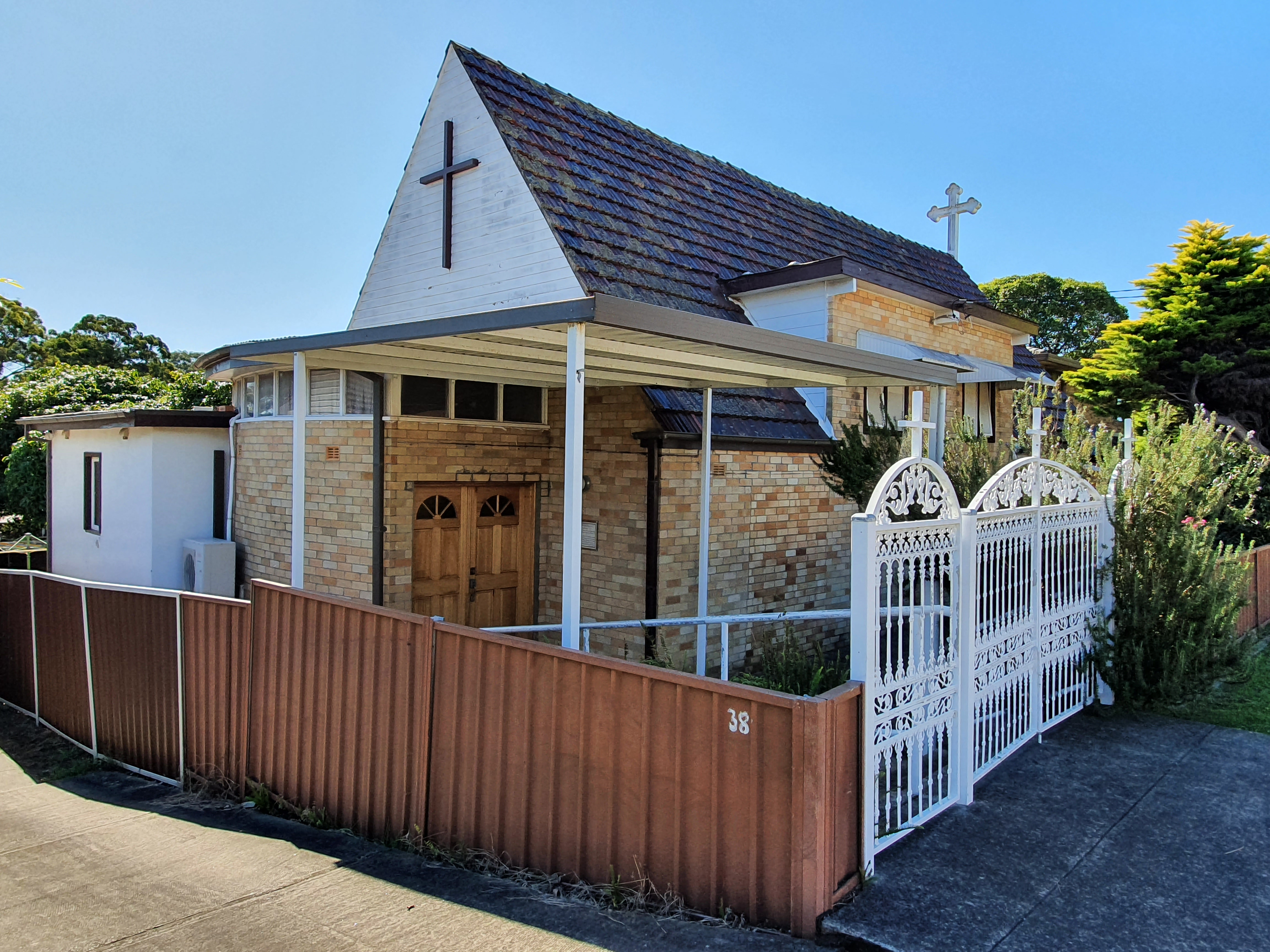
The Dormition of the Theotokos Greek Orthodox Church in Bexley, NSW, Australia.

==== Genuine Orthodox Church of Greece - Metropolis of Sydney ====
- The All-Holy Quick-Hearer - Carnegie, VIC
- St Gregory the Theologian - Bentleigh, VIC
- Dormition of the Theotokos - Sydney, NSW
- Sts Anargyroi - Dulwich Hill, NSW
- Annunciation of the Virgin Mary and St Marina - Dublin, SA
- Dormition of the Virgin Mary - Bexley, NSW
- Protection of the Virgin Mary - Merrylands, NSW
- All Saints - Kaleen, ACT
- Holy Cross Orthodox Mission - Melbourne, VIC

== See also ==
- Christianity in Australia
- Orthodox Church in America parishes in Australia
- List of monasteries in Australia
- List of cathedrals in Australia
- List of Coptic Orthodox churches in Australia
- List of Catholic dioceses in Australia
- List of Catholic churches in Australia
- Catholic Church in Australia
- Category: Protestantism in Australia by state or territory
- List of Anglican churches in the Diocese of Sydney
- List of Presbyterian and Reformed denominations in Australia
- Category: Christian denominations in Australia
- Eastern Orthodoxy by country
