= St Anthony Monastery =

St Anthony Monastery may refer to:

- Monastery of Saint Anthony, a Coptic monastery in Egypt
- Monastery of Saint Anthony, a Coptic monastery in Jerusalem, Israel
- Monastery of St Anthony, Heathcote, a Coptic monastery in Victoria, Australia
- St. Anthony's Greek Orthodox Monastery (Florence, Arizona), in the United States
- Antoniev Monastery, a former Russian Orthodox monastery in Novgorod, Russia
- St Anthony's Monastery, St Anthony, a former Catholic monastery in Cornwall, England

== See also ==
- Hospital Brothers of St. Anthony
