= St. Dimitrija Solunski Macedonian Orthodox Church =

St. Dimitrija Solunski Macedonian Orthodox Church may refer to:

- St. Dimitrija Solunski Macedonian Orthodox Church, Springvale, Victoria, Australia
- St. Dimitrija Solunski Macedonian Orthodox Church, Markham, Ontario, Canada
