= St Prophet Ilija Macedonian Orthodox Church, Footscray =

St Prophet Ilija Macedonian Orthodox Church
- Македонска Православна Црква "Свети Пророк Илија"; Makedonska Pravoslavna Crkva "Sveti Prorok Ilija"
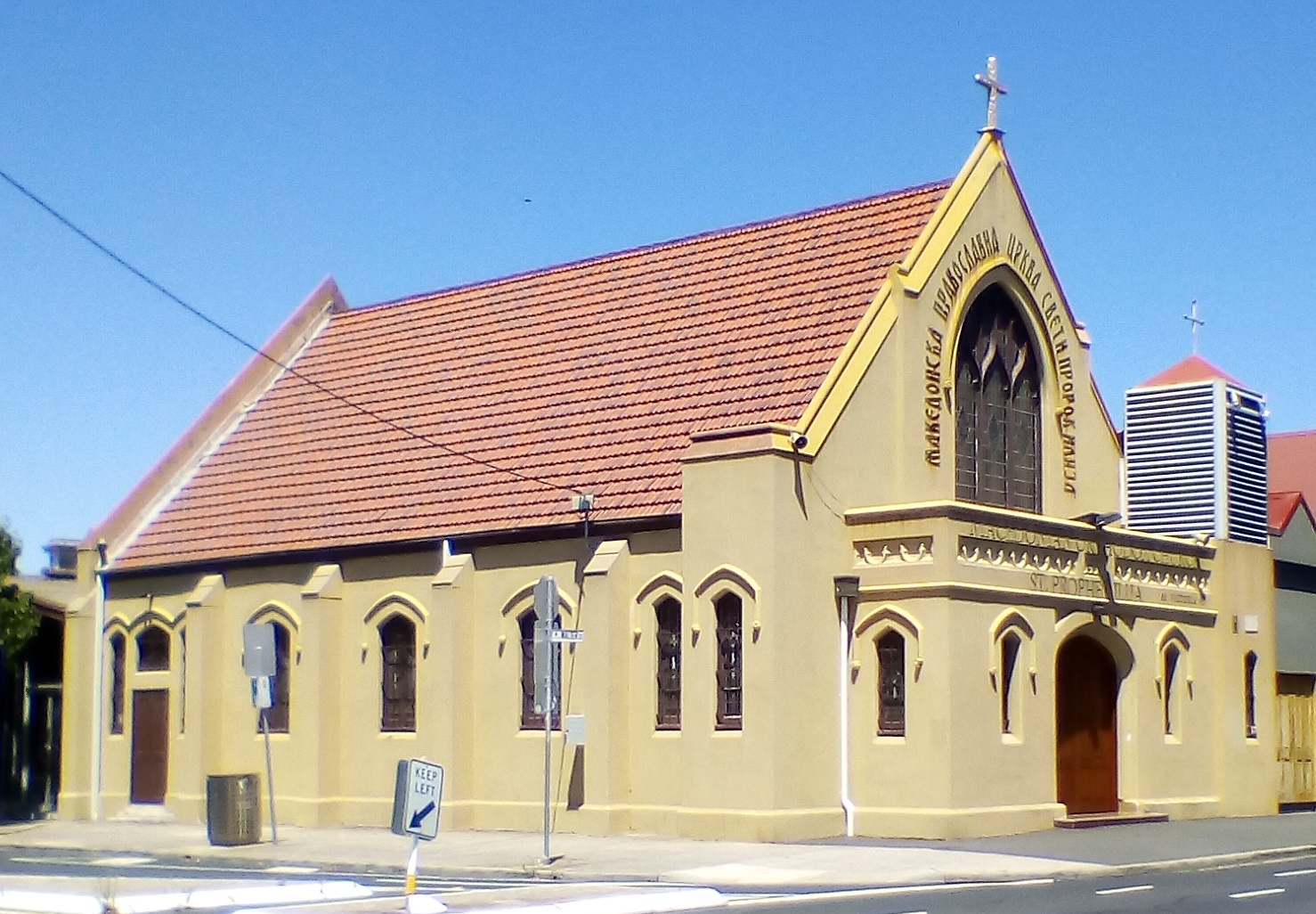

- Location in greater metropolitan Melbourne
- 37°48′17″S 144°53′33″E
- Location: 83–85 Victoria Street, Seddon 3011, Melbourne, Victoria
- Country: Australia
- Denomination: Macedonian Orthodox
- Website: St Prophet Ilija Church

History
- Status: Church
- Dedication: St. Elijah
- Consecrated: 26 December 1974

Architecture
- Functional status: Active
- Architectural type: Church
- Completed: 1935

Administration
- Diocese: Macedonian Orthodox Diocese of Australia and New Zealand

Clergy
- Priest: Reverend Father Ljupčo Karevski

The St Prophet Ilija Macedonian Orthodox Church (Macedonian: Македонска Православна Црква "Свети Пророк Илија", Makedonska Pravoslavna Crkva "Sveti Prorok Ilija") is a Macedonian Orthodox church serving the inner western Melbourne suburb of Footscray, Victoria, Australia. The church borders Footscray and is itself located on the outskirts of Seddon, an inner western Melbourne suburb. Built as a Methodist Church, it was transformed into a Macedonian Orthodox Church in the mid-1970s.

== History ==
St Ilija became the second church established by the Macedonian community in Melbourne. It is in Melbourne's inner-western suburbs on Victoria Street in the suburb of Seddon in a former Methodist Church purchased in 1974 and renamed St Prophet Elijah. The church consecration took place on 26 December 1974.

In 1984, the church bought a 40-acre property in Rocklyn to host large annual Macedonian community picnics. Part of the Rocklyn property is also the site of the new St Naum of Ohrid Monastery, built in the early 2010s.

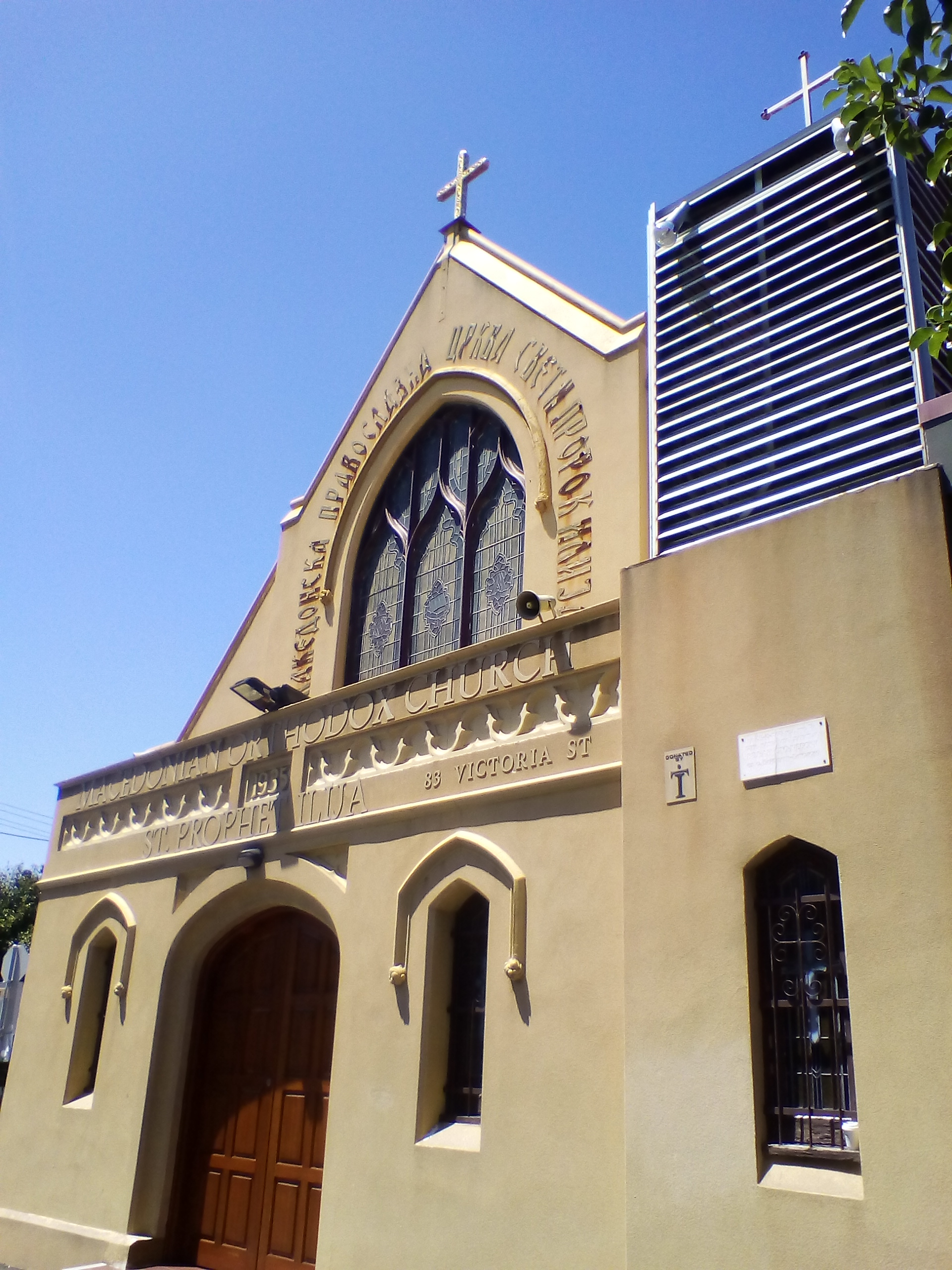
Church entrance

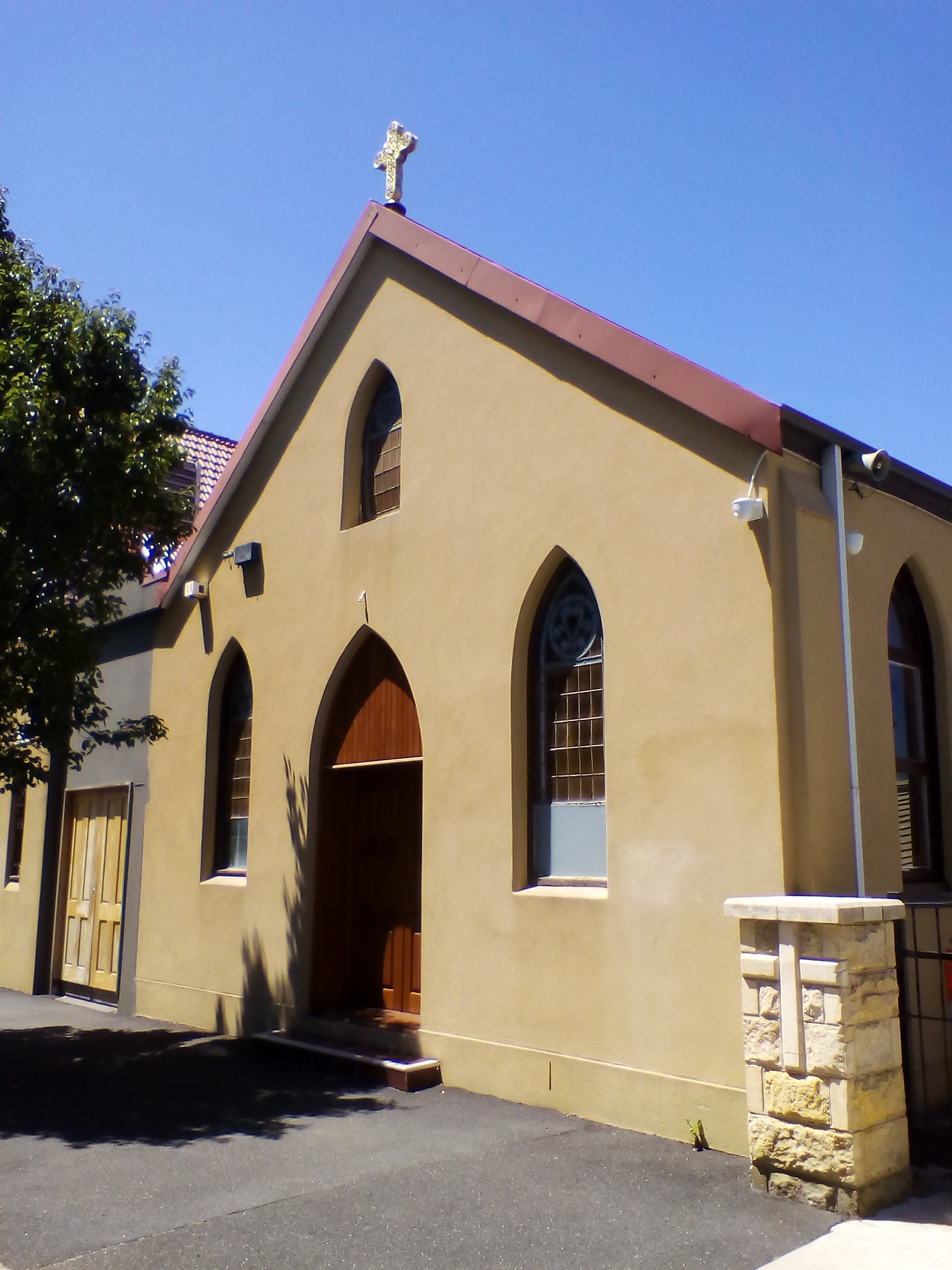
Church hall

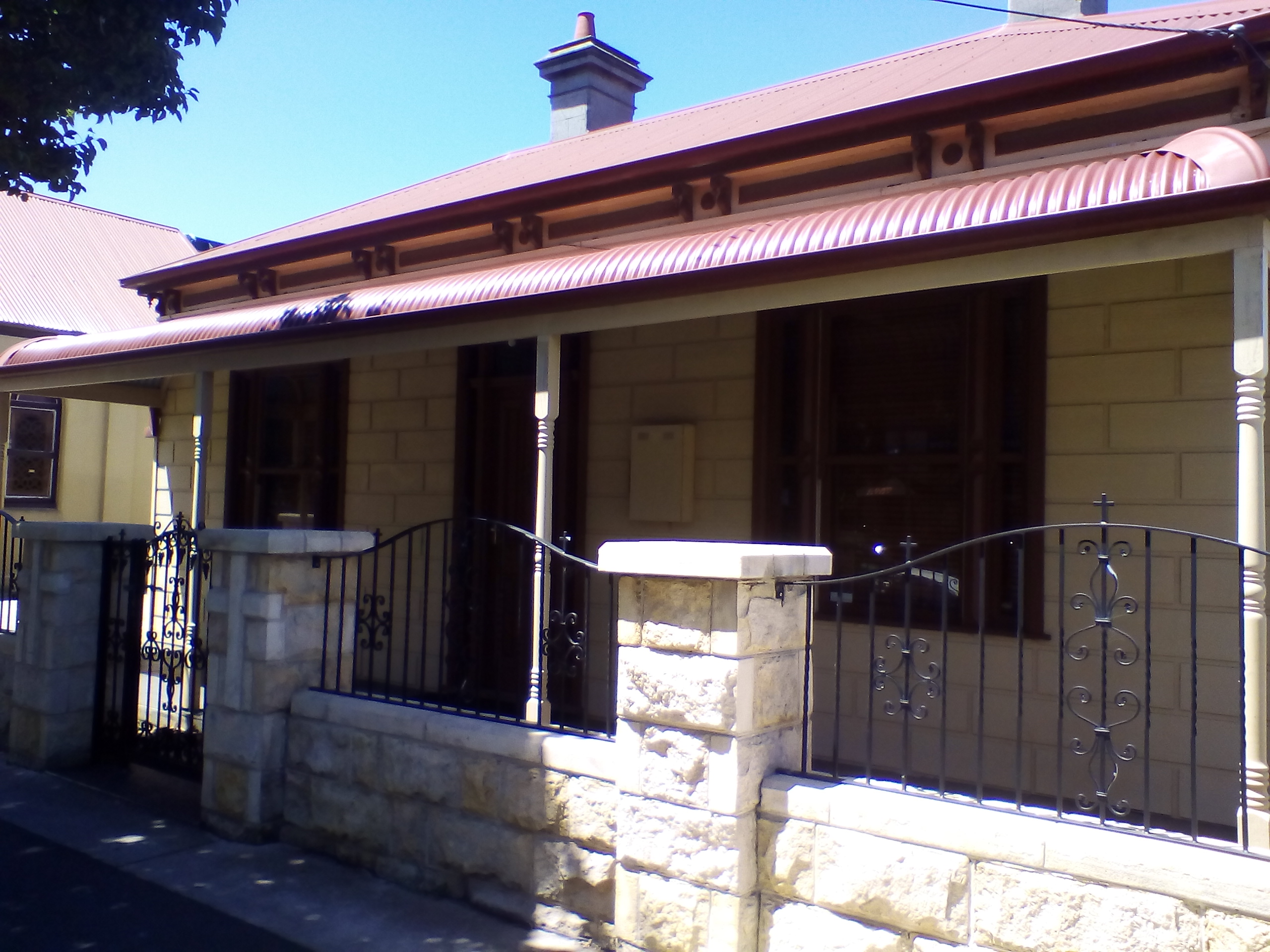
Church owned house where Macedonian is taught

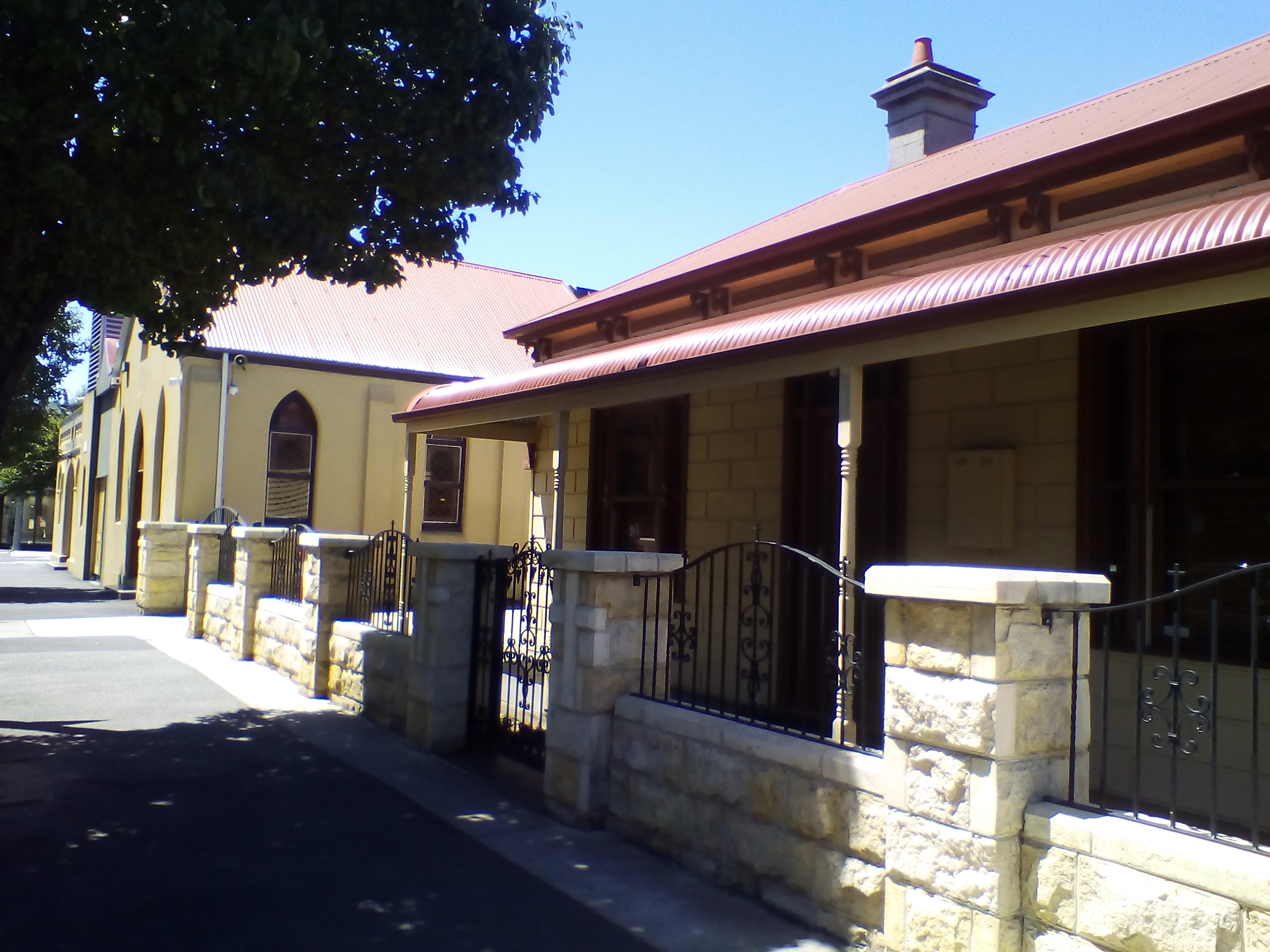
Streetscape showing all three buildings

== See also ==
- Macedonian Australians
