= St Petka Macedonian Orthodox Church, Mill Park =

St Petka Macedonian Orthodox Church
- Македонска Православна Црква "Св. Петка"; Makedonska Pravoslavna Crkva "Sv. Petka"
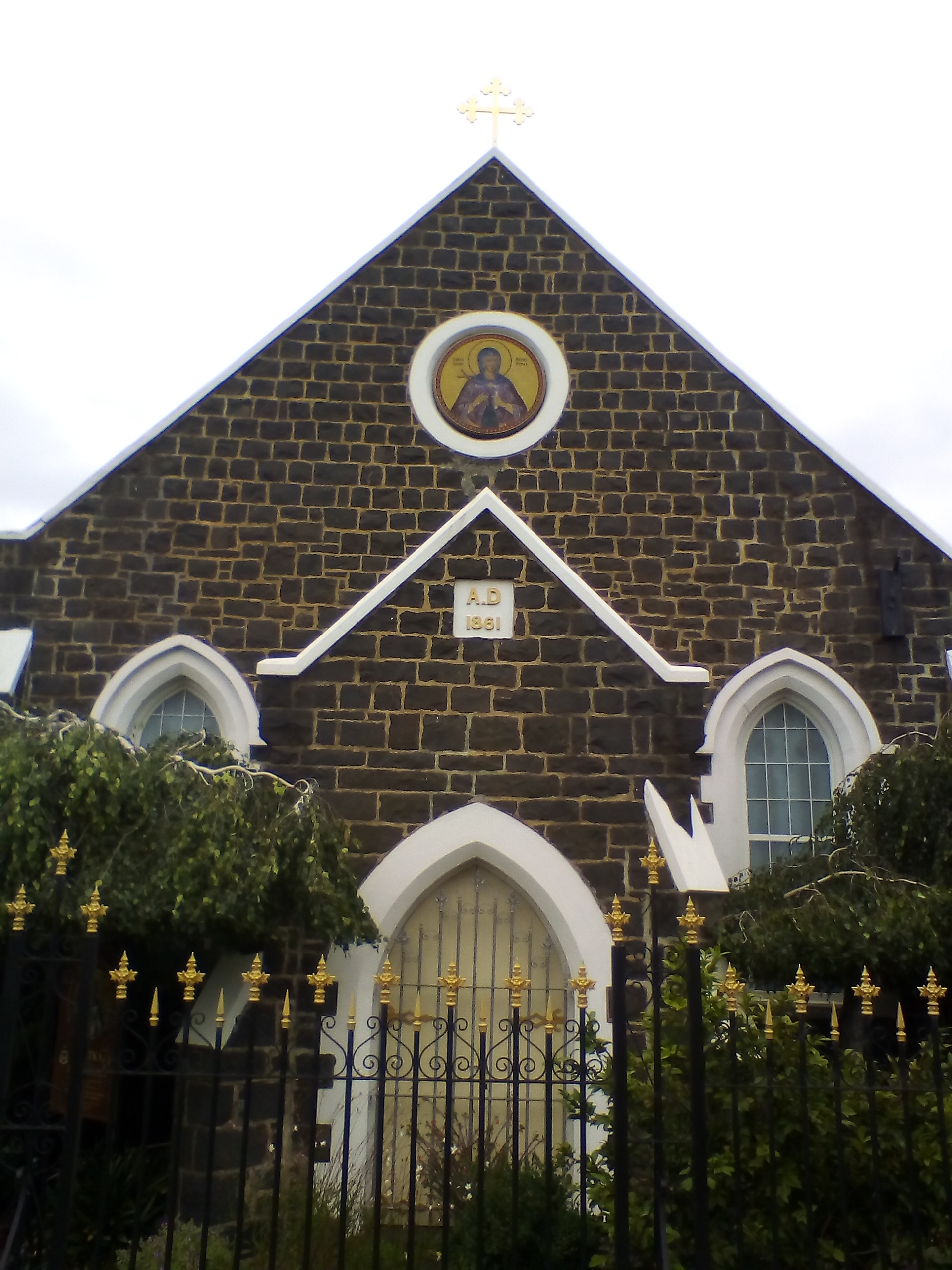

- Location in greater metropolitan Melbourne
- 37°40′29″S 145°04′12″E
- Location: 281-285 Plenty Road, Mill Park 3082, Melbourne, Victoria
- Country: Australia
- Denomination: Macedonian Orthodox
- Previous denomination: Presbyterian
- Website: St Petka Church

History
- Former name: Janefield Presbyterian Church
- Status: Church
- Dedication: St Paraskeva
- Consecrated: 2000

Architecture
- Functional status: Active
- Architectural type: Church
- Completed: 1861

Administration
- Diocese: Macedonian Orthodox Diocese of Australia and New Zealand

Clergy
- Priest: Reverend Father Tone Gulev

St Petka Macedonian Orthodox Church (Macedonian: Македонска Православна Црква "Св. Петка", Makedonska Pravoslavna Crkva "Sv. Petka") is the Macedonian Orthodox church located in Mill Park, a suburb of northern Melbourne, Victoria, Australia. The church is an old bluestone building with a new Orthodox interior, alongside nearby community facilities. Built in 1861 as a Presbyterian Church, the building is one of a few early churches built in the Plenty Valley area and was added to a non-statuary heritage list by the Victorian branch of the National Trust. In the late 1990s, the church was transformed into a Macedonian Orthodox Church and joined the local Macedonian Orthodox Diocese.

== History and structure ==
The church was constructed in 1861 and belonged to the Christian Presbyterian denomination. Known as the Janefield Presbyterian Church and located in the Plenty Valley, an area of Scottish settlement, the church was one of three built in the region at the time. The church itself is small, built from blue stone, and its roof is hipped and laid with slate tiles, alongside additional structures on the building's east and west sides. By the late twentieth century, the building had fallen into disrepair and a 1990 Whittlesea Heritage study described its "poor structural condition" was caused by movements from unstable footings and wall cracks, due to its large windows. The study noted the continuation of problems emanating from the building's inadequate design and lacked quality skilled masonry. The church nonetheless was listed on the local heritage overlay and proposed for the Victorian Heritage and the Australian Heritage Commission Register.

The building was in a dilapidated state when it was bought in 1996 by the Australian-New Zealand Macedonian Orthodox Diocese. The church became part of the Macedonian Diocese during 1997, and its consecration occurred in 2000. Extensive repairs were made to the structure, and the whole church interior was rebuilt and remade into a Byzantine-Orthodox design. An iconographer from Romania painted high-quality frescoes on each of the church's interior walls. The Orthodox iconography creates the appearance of a larger space than otherwise is in the small interior, inducing mystical overtones. During the liturgy, an atmospheric interior is generated through ceremonial practices such as the use of candles, incense, ritual foods, and performance of choir singing. Nearby, a few additional buildings have been constructed to serve the needs and activities of the congregation. The local Macedonian community celebrated the twentieth anniversary of the church in November 2017.

== Gallery ==
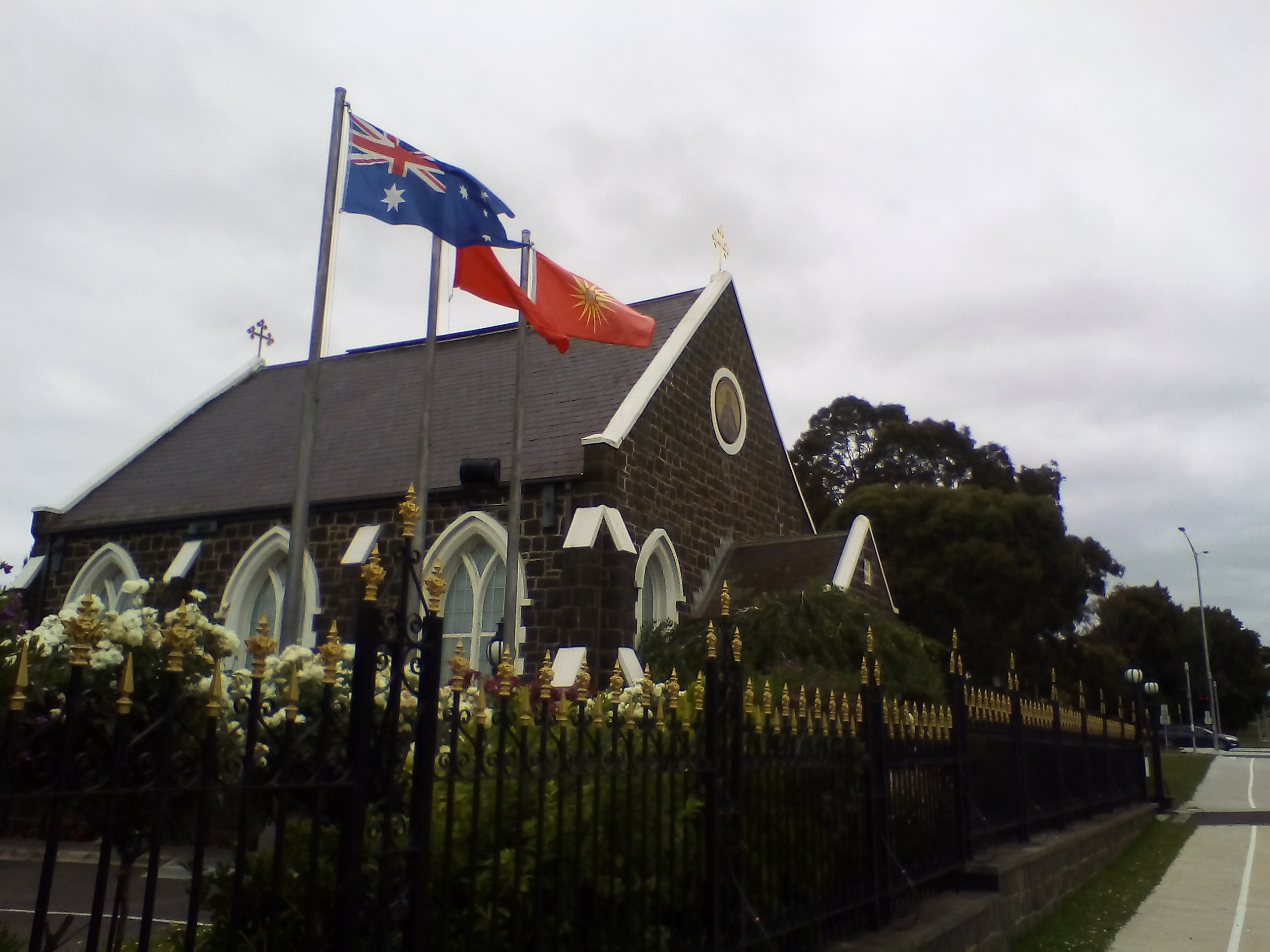
Side view of church

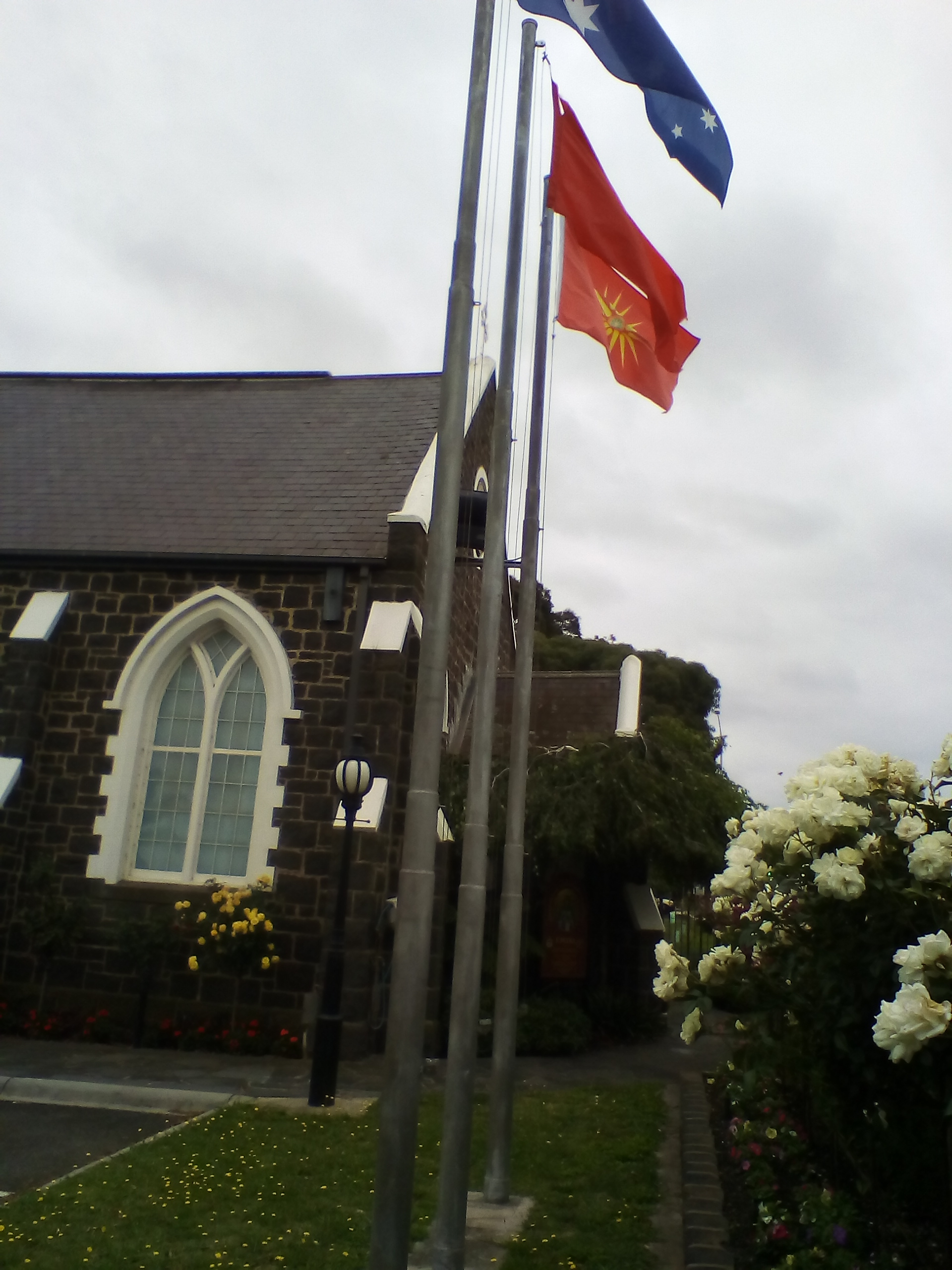
Side view of church

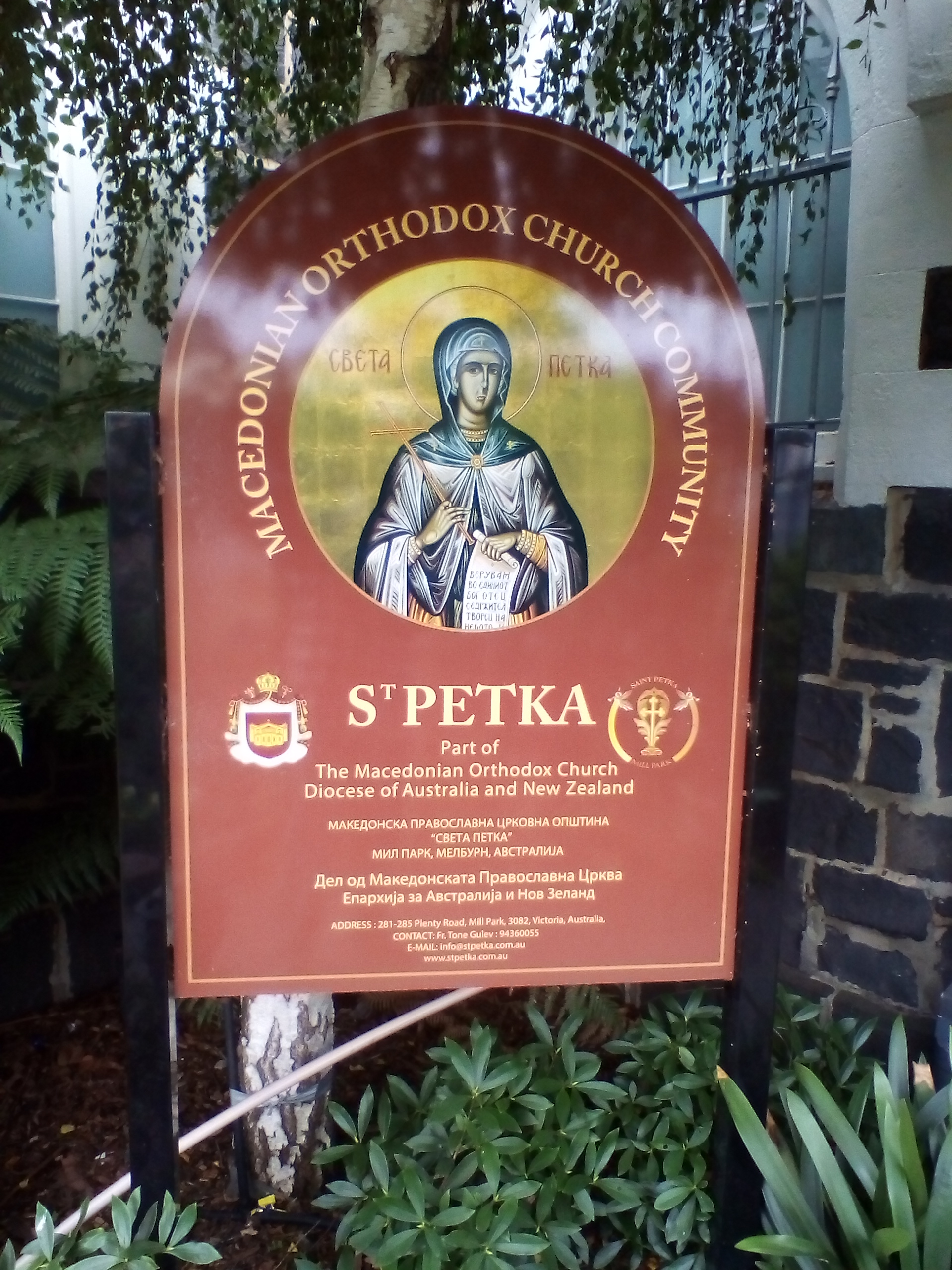
Church sign

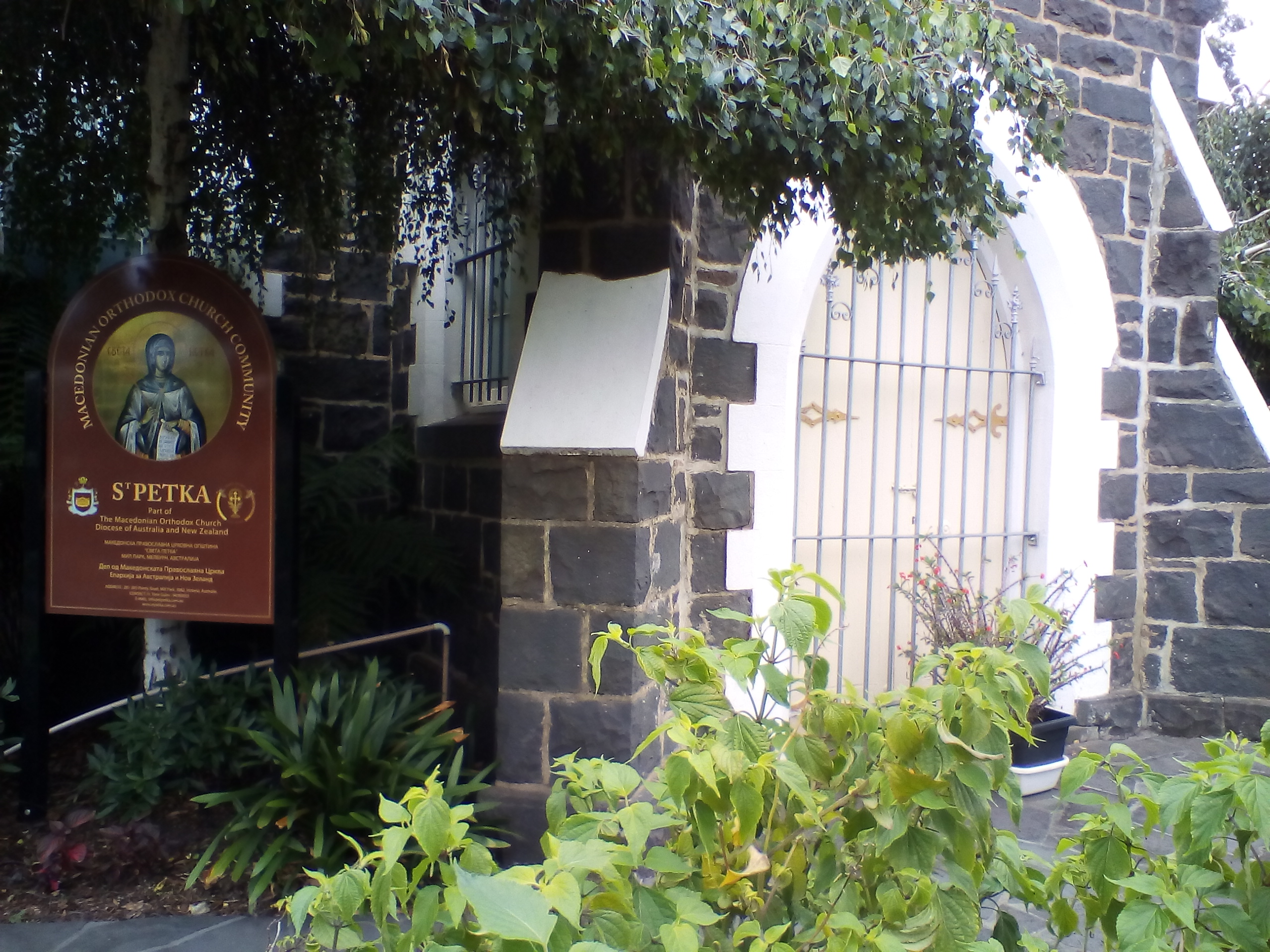
Church entrance

== See also ==
- Macedonian Australians
