= Orthodox Church in America Parishes in Australia =

Former administrative unit of the Orthodox Church in America

The states that the Parishes in Australia had jurisdiction.

The Parishes in Australia refer to a former administrative district of the Orthodox Church in America (OCA) that existed within two states in Australia – New South Wales and Queensland.

== History ==
In 1971, in a split from the Russian Orthodox Church Outside Russia (ROCOR), a group of Eastern Orthodox faithful applied to the Orthodox Church in America for acceptance. A parish was formed in Bankstown, NSW, in 1971, under the rectorship of Archimandrite Veniamin (Garshin) and under the patronage of St. Nicholas. A second parish in Brisbane, Holy Annunciation Church, was also formed under the rectorship of Fr. Gregory Malisheff.

In 1977, a third grouping, later named the Australian Orthodox Fraternity of St Michael, was formed in Sydney for the purpose of purchasing and organizing another parish, under the rectorship of Fr. Michael Mersher. Fr. Michael was the rector from 1978 to 1980, Fr Theodore Michaluk from 1980 to 1986, Fr. Leopold in 1986, and Fr. Igor Chlabicz, beginning in 1987.

Following Archim. Veniamin's death in 1994, the Orthodox Church in America was unable to supply a replacement priest for the Bankstown parish. The parish council of St. Nicholas approached the Antiochian Orthodox Bishop Gibran (Ramlawey) of Australia and New Zealand and asked if he was able to supply a priest who could celebrate in Slavonic. Hieromonk Andrija (Zoran) Vujisić and later Fr. Nicholas Gan assisted on a temporary basis until Fr. Mitko Machevski was appointed and commenced services at St Nicholas on 10 August 1996. The parish later formally changed jurisdictions to the Antiochian Orthodox Archdiocese of Australia and New Zealand. Fr. Mitko was appointed rector of the parish, which continues to use Church Slavonic and follows the Julian calendar.

Holy Annunciation Church in Brisbane had a succession of rectors and interim priests, including Igumen Dimitry Obukhoff until 1982, Fr. John Jillions (1984-88) and Fr. Ian Bojko (1989-2005). After health problems forced Fr. Ian out of active ministry in c.2005, the parish was without a rector for some years, until 2009 when the parish formally requested acceptance into the ROCOR, which was accepted with the mutual consent of both the OCA and the ROCOR.

The final parish remained in the Orthodox Church in America - Parishes in Australia was the Australian Orthodox Fraternity of St Michael, until its canonical transfer in 2011. Fr. John Vesic, a priest of the Serbian Orthodox Metropolitanate of Australia and New Zealand, was assigned as their rector, and the parish is now the first (and only) English-language parish in the Serbian Orthodox Metropolitanate.

With the 2013 repose of Fr. Ian Bojko, there is no longer an OCA presence in Australia.
