= List of Coptic Orthodox churches in Australia =

== Diocese of Melbourne, West and South Australia, New Zealand and All Oceania ==

The diocese is currently under the guidance of Pope Tawadros II. The diocese territory includes Victoria, Tasmania, ACT, South Australia, Western Australia, New Zealand and All Oceania.

As of 1st of July 2025, Bishop Rewis was appointed General Bishop of The Diocese of Melbourne and its affiliated regions in accordance with Papal decree 2/2025.

The following is a list of the churches under the diocese and the priests that serve in each church:

=== Victoria ===
- Archangel Michael & St. Anthony; Oakleigh
  - Fr Daniel Ghabrial (Vicar General)
  - Fr Luke Sorsok
  - Fr Angelos Raphael
- St. Athanasius; Donvale
  - Fr Antonious Guirguis
  - Fr Tadawos Abdelmalak
  - Fr Gregorios Awad
- St. Bishoy & St. Shenouda; Bulleen
  - Fr Mina Issac
  - Fr Salib Farouk
  - Fr Markos Gouhar
  - Fr Paul Awad (Diocese Secretary)
- St. George; St. Albans
  - Fr Thomas Abdelmalek
  - Fr Marcos Yassa
  - Fr Samuel Elias
  - Fr Peter Agaibi
  - Fr Anthony Mikhail
  - Fr Moses Morcos
- St. James; Vermont
  - Fr Shenouda Botros
- St. John & St Verena; Armadale
  - Fr Mark Attalla
  - Fr Sourial Sourial
  - Fr Daniel Bolis
  - Fr Raphael Bassily
  - Fr John Abdelmalek
  - Fr Andrew Alexander
  - Deaconess Verena
- St. Joseph & St. Anasimone; Castlemaine
- St. Karas & St. Severus of Antioch; Pakenham
  - Fr Silas Abdelnour
- St. Macarius the Great; Yarrambat
  - Fr Stephen Mankarious
  - Fr Arsanios Saleeb
  - Fr Anthony Shehata
- St. Mark; Preston
  - Fr Youhanna Samuel
  - Fr George Farag
  - Fr Jacob Benyamin
- St. Mary; Kensington
  - Fr Tadros Sharobeam
  - Fr Habib-Girgis Younan
  - Fr Michael Salib
  - Fr Kyrillos Tawadros
  - Fr John Makari
- St. Mina & St Marina; Hallam
  - Fr Abanoub Attalla
  - Fr Timotheous Ghabrial
  - Fr Isaac El-Antony
  - Fr Athanasius Attia
  - Fr Elijah Fanous
  - Fr Isaac Wissa
  - Fr Michael Galli
  - Fr James Nessim
- St. Moses, Geelong
  - Fr George Farag
- St. Paul the Apostle; Bendigo
  - Fr John Edward
- St. Philopater Mercurius, Melton
  - Fr David Kamel
- St. Pope Kyrellos VI, Traralgon
  - Fr Abanoub Attalla
- St. Verena & St Bishoy; Eporo Tower
  - Fr Pestavros Iskandar

=== Australian Capital Territory ===
- St. Mark Coptic Orthodox Church; Kaleen
  - Fr Toma Boctor
  - Fr Michael Zamer

=== South Australia ===
- Archangel Michael & St. Mark; Magill
  - Fr Markos Abdelmalak
- St. George & St. Shenouda; Huntfield Heights
  - Fr Karas Gilada
- St. Mary & St. Bishoy; Cowandilla
  - Fr Philopos Boghdadi
  - Fr Bishoy Youhanna

=== Western Australia ===
- St. Mark & St. George; Wanneroo
  - Fr Titus El-Baramousy
  - Fr Polycarpos El-Baramousy
  - Fr Youhanna Zakaria
  - Fr Michael George
- St. Mary & Archangel Michael, East Victoria Park
  - Fr Abram Abdelmalek
  - Fr John Rizkallah
  - Fr Samuel Boctor
  - Fr Mathious Andrawos
  - Fr Asoufa (Ethiopian Coptic Orthodox)

=== Tasmania ===
- St. Demiana & St. Abraam; Newstead
- St. Mary; Hobart
  - Fr Daniel Roushdy

=== New Zealand ===
- Archangel Michael; Dunedin
- St. George; Timaru
  - Fr Marteros Morcos
- St. Mark; Auckland
  - Fr Bishoy Mikhael (Vicar of New Zealand)
- St. Mary & St Athanasius; Christchurch
  - Fr Barsom Ibrahem
- St Mary & St Mina; Wellington
  - Fr Hedra El-Baramousy

=== Fiji ===
- St. George; Nadi
  - Fr Joseph Baraka
- St. Mark; Suva
  - Fr Raphael Bassily
  - Fr David Tokoniono
- St. Mary; Taveuni
  - Fr Antony Lemuelu
  - Fr Daniel Kalaveti
  - Deacon Mina
- St. Rowais; Nadi
  - Fr John Abdelmalek
  - Fr Sourial Youssef

=== Solomon Islands ===
- St. Mary & Archangel Gabriel; Auki
  - Fr Moses Mikhael
  - Deacon Suriel

== Monastery of St Anthony, Heathcote, Victoria ==
The monastery is situated on 150 acres (0.61 km^{2}) of land. It is the first Coptic monastery to be established in Australia. The monastery is currently under the direct jurisdiction of Bishop Rewis, General Bishop of the Diocese of Melbourne and affiliated regions. The abbot of the monastery is the bishop of the diocese.

== Monastery of Archangel Michael for Nuns, Woodend, Victoria ==
The monastery was established in 2015. It is the first Coptic monastery for Nuns to be established in Australia. The Monastery was recognized by the Holy Synod as an official Monastery on 2 June 2023. There are a total of four nuns who live and worship in the monastery:

- Nun Antonia Archangel Michael
- Nun Mikaela Archangel Michael
- Nun Angella Archangel Michael
- Nun Gabriella Archangel Michael

== Diocese of Sydney, New South Wales, Queensland, Northern Territory and all East Asia ==
The diocese is currently under the guidance of Pope Tawadros since April 2023. Bishop Daniel is the bishop of the diocese and has overseen the expansion of the churches, services and the flock of the diocese since his ordination in 2002. The diocese territory includes Sydney, New South Wales, Queensland, Northern Territory, Thailand, Singapore, and all East Asia. The following is a list of the churches under the diocese and the priests serving in each church:

=== New South Wales ===
- Archangel Michael & St. Bishoy; Mount Druitt
  - Fr Antonios Kaldas
  - Fr Botros Morkos
  - Fr Gabriel Yassa
  - Fr Bishoy Botros
  - Fr Karas Faragalla
  - Fr Isaac Girgis
- Pope Cyril VI & St. Archdeacon Habib Girgis; Blakehurst
  - Fr Youssef Fanous
  - Fr Joseph Ghattas
  - Fr Kyrillos Ghannami
- St. Abraam; Long Point
  - Fr Mina Diskoros
  - Fr Paula Balamon
  - Fr Paul Fanous
  - Fr Peter Atta
- St. Antonious & St. Paula; Guildford
  - Fr Tadros Simon
  - Fr Shenouda Mansour
  - Fr Gawargious Ramandious
  - Fr Makarios Ibrahim
  - Fr Seraphim Sidaros
- St. Barbara & Abba Nofer the Hermit; Bradbury
  - Fr Thomas Dos
  - Fr Jonathan Alexander
- St. Bishoy Kamel & St. Yostos El Antony; North Richmond
  - Fr Timon Abdelmessih
- St. Catherine; Catherine Field
- St. Demiana & St. Athanasius; Punchbowl
  - Fr Hanna Gad (Vicar General)
  - Fr George Nakhil
- St. George; Kensington
  - Fr Marcos Tawfik
  - Fr Rafael Iskander
  - Fr Matthew Attia
  - Fr Kyrillos Farag
  - Fr Michael Tanious
- St. George & Prince Tadros; Liverpool
  - Fr Anthony Morgan
  - Fr Salib Salib
- St. John; South Hurstville
  - Fr Luke Ishak
- St. John the Baptist & Elijah the Prophet; Dubbo
- St. Karas the Hermit; Leumeah
  - Fr Augustinos El-Antony
- St. Luke; Sylvania
  - Fr Daniel Fanous
  - Fr Samuel Fanous
- St. Mark; Arncliffe
  - Fr Yacoub Magdy
  - Fr Augustinos Nada
  - Fr Jonathan Ishak
  - Fr Mark Basily
  - Fr Michael Fanous
  - Fr Elijah Iskander
  - Fr David Shehata
  - Fr Anthony Sharkawi
- St. Mary of Egypt; Pymble
  - Fr Meena Awad (General Priest - NSW)
- St. Mary & Archangel Michael, The Entrance
  - Fr Michael Fanous
- St. Mary & Archangel Michael, Coffs Harbour
- St. Mary & Pope Kyrillos VI, Cundletown (Taree)
  - Fr Bishoy Soliman
- St. Mary, St. Anthony & St. Paul, Orange
- St. Mary & St. George; Beresfield (Newcastle)
  - Fr John Ghandour
- St. Mary & St. John the Beloved; Wagga Wagga
  - Fr Yostos Wasif
- St. Mary & St. Joseph; Peakhurst
  - Fr Moussa Soliman
  - Fr Stefanos El-Antony
  - Fr Luke Malek
  - Fr Marcos Tadros
- St. Mary & St. Luke, Point Clare (Gosford)
  - Fr Luke Sergious
- St. Mary & St. Karas, Port Macquarie
- St. Mary & St. Cosman & St. Demian; Kellyville
  - Fr Joshua Tadros
  - Fr Timothy Besada
  - Fr Antony Mansour
- St. Mary & St. Marina; Llandilo
  - Fr Bishoy Elias
- St. Mary & St. Merkorious; Rhodes
  - Fr Bishoy Yassa
  - Fr Youhanna Bestawros
  - Fr Sharobim Sharobim (Diocese Secretary)
  - Fr Angelos Guirguis
  - Fr Alexander Aziz
  - Fr Morris Morris
- St. Mary & St. Mina's Cathedral; Bexley
  - Fr Samuel Guirguis
  - Fr Mikhail Mikhail
  - Fr Daoud Naguib
  - Fr Abdelmessih Girgis
  - Fr Shenouti Gobran
  - Fr Pishoy-Kamel Selim
  - Fr Emmanuel Iskander
- St. Mary, St. Pakhomious & St. Shenouda; Kirrawee
  - Fr Tadros El-Pakhoumi
  - Fr Pakhomious Erian
  - Fr John Sorial
- St. Mary & St. Sidhom Pishay; Dural
  - Fr Arsanious Barsoum
  - Fr Cyril Abdelmalik
- St. Moses the Mighty, St. Maximos & St. Domadios; Goulburn
- St. Paul; Blacktown
  - Fr Pavlos Hanna
  - Fr Andrew Francis
- St. Paul & St. Reweis; Collaroy
  - Fr Bassilious Gad
- St. Peter & St. Paul; Berkeley (Wollongong)
  - Fr Moses Ayad
- St. Rebecca & her Five Children; Picton
  - Fr Bishoy Soliman
- St. Wanas; Belmore
  - Fr Suriel Hanna
- The Apostles & St. Abanoub; Blacktown
  - Fr Pavlos Hanna
  - Fr Athanasius Ibrahim
  - Fr Philtaous Metri
  - Fr David ElMasri
  - Fr Andrew Francis
- Theotokos & St Demiana House for Deaconesses; Mount Druitt
  - Sister Irini
  - Sister Mary
  - Sister Petronia
  - Sister Ruth

=== Queensland ===
- St. Mark & St. George; Strathpine
  - Fr Botros Elkomos
- St. Mary & St. Anthony Monastery; Kooralbyn
  - Fr Moussa El-Antony (Abbot)
- St. Mary & Archangel Michael Monastery for Nuns; Kooralbyn
  - Mother Nardin El-Demiana
  - Mother Thelel Abu Sufein
- St. Mary & St. George; Townsville
  - Fr Joshua Younan
- St. Mary & St. Joseph; Coopers Plains
- St. Mary & St. Cyril, Cairns
  - Fr Joshua Younan
- St. Mary & St. Moses the Strong; Bundaberg
  - Fr Abraham Rizk
- St. Mina & St. Anthony; Helensvale
  - Fr Bishoy El-Antony
  - Fr Michael Lawandi
- St. Verena; Gold Coast
- Virgin Mary; Calamvale
  - Fr Mettaos Wahba (Vicar - QLD)
  - Fr David Mahrous
- St Mary & St George; Toowoomba
- General Priests
  - Fr Moses Meleka

=== Northern Territory ===
- St. Mary, St. Moses the Mighty & St. Takla Haimanot; Darwin
  - Fr Moussa Beshara

=== East Asia ===
==== Japan ====
- St. Mary & St. Mark; Kyoto
  - Fr Youeel Anba Bishoy

==== Thailand ====
- St. Mark & St. George; Bangkok
- St. James the Apostle Orphanage; Sangkhlaburi
  - Fr Youhanna Bestawros

==== Singapore ====
- St. Mark; Singapore

==== Mainland China ====
- St. Anthony & St. Paul; Guangzhou
- St. Mark; Yiwu

==== Malaysia ====
- St. Mary & St. Mark; Malacca
- St. Mary & Archangel Michael; Kuala Lumpur

==== General Priests ====
- Fr Mettaous Fakhoury
- Fr Abanoub Maximous
- Fr Demian El-Antony Ava Moussa
- Fr Efraim Abdelshahid
- Fr Meena Awad (General Priest - NSW)
- Fr Moses Meleka (General priest - QLD)

== Monastery of St Shenouda the Archmandrite, Putty, New South Wales ==
The monastery is situated on a land of approximately 110 acres (0.45 km^{2}). Bishop Daniel was ordained Abbot of the Monastery of St Shenouda the Archimandrite, Sydney on 7 June 2009.

As of 2026, eleven monks and one novice live and worship in the monastery:

- Fr Wissa St Shenouda (hegumen)
- Fr Shenouda St Shenouda (hegumen)
- Fr Theodore St Shenouda (hegumen)
- Fr Anthony St Shenouda (hegumen)
- Fr Moses St Shenouda (hegumen)
- Fr John St Shenouda (hegumen)
- Fr Mark St Shenouda (priest)
- Fr Paul St Shenouda (monk)
- Fr Seraphim St Shenouda (monk)
- Fr Macarius St Shenouda (monk)
- Fr Bishoy St Shenouda (monk)
- Brother Athanasius (novice)

There is also one monk who serve outside the Monastery on a temporary basis:

- Fr Tadros St Shenouda (serving in Egypt)

== Monastery of Virgin Mary for Nuns, Goulburn, New South Wales ==
The monastery is under the guidance of Pope Tawadros II. It is situated in Goulburn, New South Wales. As of 2025, two nuns live and worship in the monastery:

- Mother Katrina Virgin Mary
- Mother Elisavet Virgin Mary

== See also ==
- Copts in Australia
- List of Eastern Orthodox churches in Australia
