= Macedonian Orthodox Diocese of Australia - Sydney =

Diocese of the Macedonian Orthodox Church

Diocese of Australia - Sydney Австралиско - Сиднејска Епархија

Location
- Territory: Australia
- Headquarters: Australia
- Denomination: Eastern Orthodox

Current leadership
- Bishop: Vacant

Website
- MOC Diocese of Australia - Sydney

The Macedonian Orthodox Diocese of Australia - Sydney (Macedonian: Австралиско - Сиднејска Епархија) is one of a number of dioceses of the Macedonian Orthodox Church (MOC). There are some 27 MOC churches in Australia. Slightly over half are under the Macedonian Orthodox diocese former administrator headed by Metropolitan Timotej.

== History ==
Over some two decades (mid-1990s to mid-2010s) the Macedonian Orthodox Diocese of Australia and New Zealand experienced internal divisions regarding the matter of property ownership. In the context of Australian law, a sizable number of parishioners view themselves and not the Macedonian Orthodox Church as owners of properties and churches in the country. In early 2012, people representing the parishes and municipalities who refuse Metropolitan Petar's legitimacy entered into negotiations with the MOC. Both sides agreed to a short-term solution which acknowledged each other. One group would be part of the jurisdiction of Metropolitan Petar and the other under the MOC and its Synod. The MOC synod convened a meeting whose outcome resulted in Metropolitan Timothy becoming the overseer of Macedonian parishes who do not support Metropolitan Petar in Australia. The number of parishes of the Macedonian Orthodox Diocese of Australia - Sydney under first administrator Metropolitan Timothy are 14. Both sides agreed to put on hold any legal processes in order to allow for time to reach a solution over a period of 3 years. In the late 2010s the situation had become formalised and the churches under Metropolitan Timothy are organised as first administrator of the Macedonian Orthodox Diocese of Australia - Sydney.

== See also ==
- Assembly of Canonical Orthodox Bishops of Australia, New Zealand, and Oceania
