= St. Dimitrija Solunski Macedonian Orthodox Church, Springvale =

St. Dimitrija Solunski Macedonian Orthodox Church
- Македонска Православна Црква „Св. Димитрија Солунски“ Makedonska Pravoslavna Crkva “Sv. Dimitrija Solunski“
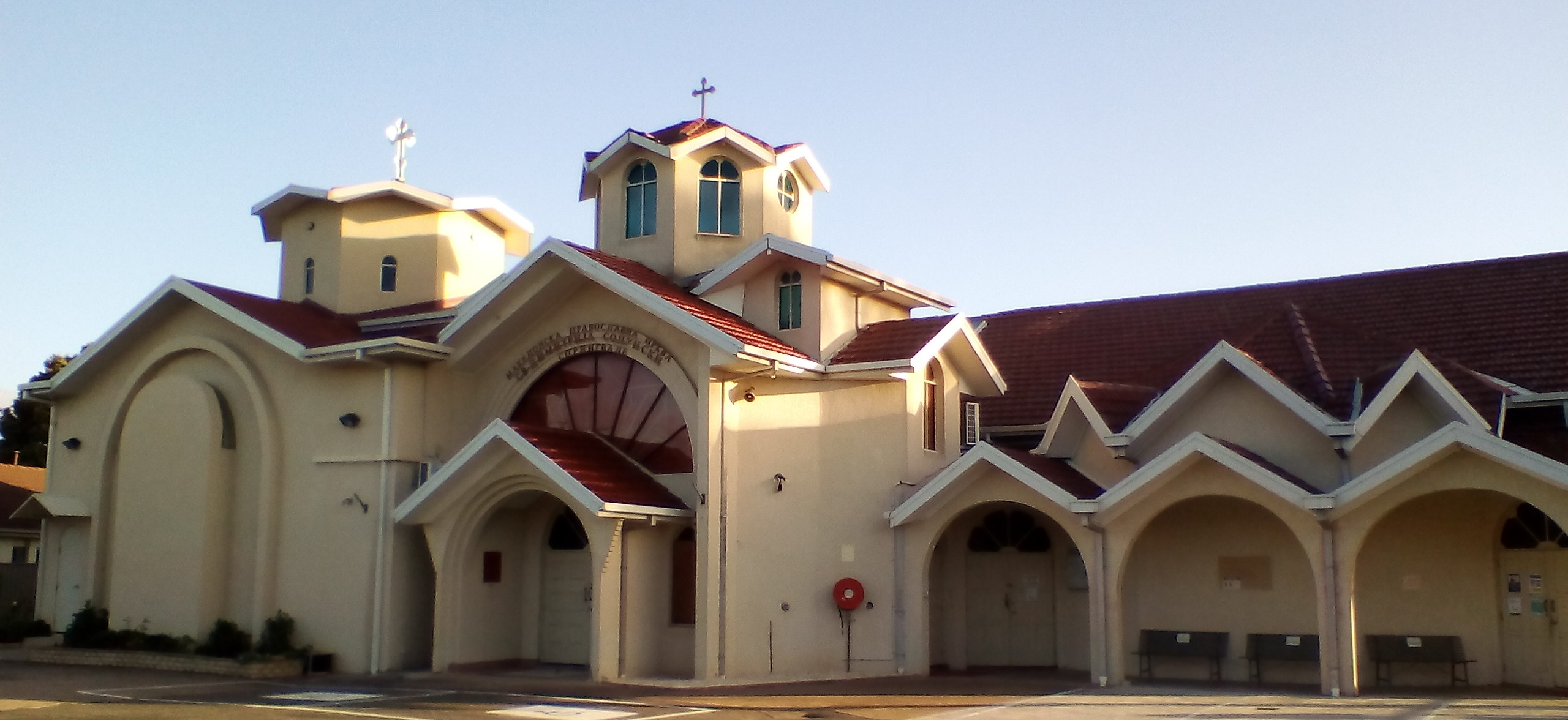

- Location in greater metropolitan Melbourne
- 37°56′09″S 145°10′10″E
- Location: 1 Edinburgh Rd, Springvale 3171, Melbourne, Victoria
- Country: Australia
- Denomination: Macedonian Orthodox
- Website: St. Dimitrija Solunski Church

History
- Status: Church
- Dedication: St. Demetrius

Architecture
- Functional status: Active
- Architectural type: Church
- Completed: 1986

Administration
- Diocese: Macedonian Orthodox Diocese of Australia and New Zealand

Clergy
- Priest: Reverend Father Mirko Pesovski

St. Dimitrij Solunski Macedonian Orthodox Church (Macedonian: Македонска Православна Црква „Св. Димитрија Солунски“, Makedonska Pravoslavna Crkva „Sv. Dimitrij Solunski“) is the Macedonian Orthodox church located in Springvale, a suburb of southeastern Melbourne, Victoria, Australia.

The Macedonian Orthodox Metropolitan for Australia, Timotej, first consecrated the church in 1986. In early 1994, as tense relations between Greek Australians and Macedonian Australians developed after the Republic of North Macedonia gained recognition from Australia, the church was subjected to an arson attack. After a renovation, the church was re-consecrated in 1996 by Petar, the Metropolitan for Australia. In 2009 renovations and new extension of the church commenced. The works and the final project was completed in 2012, when the final consecration was done by Petar.

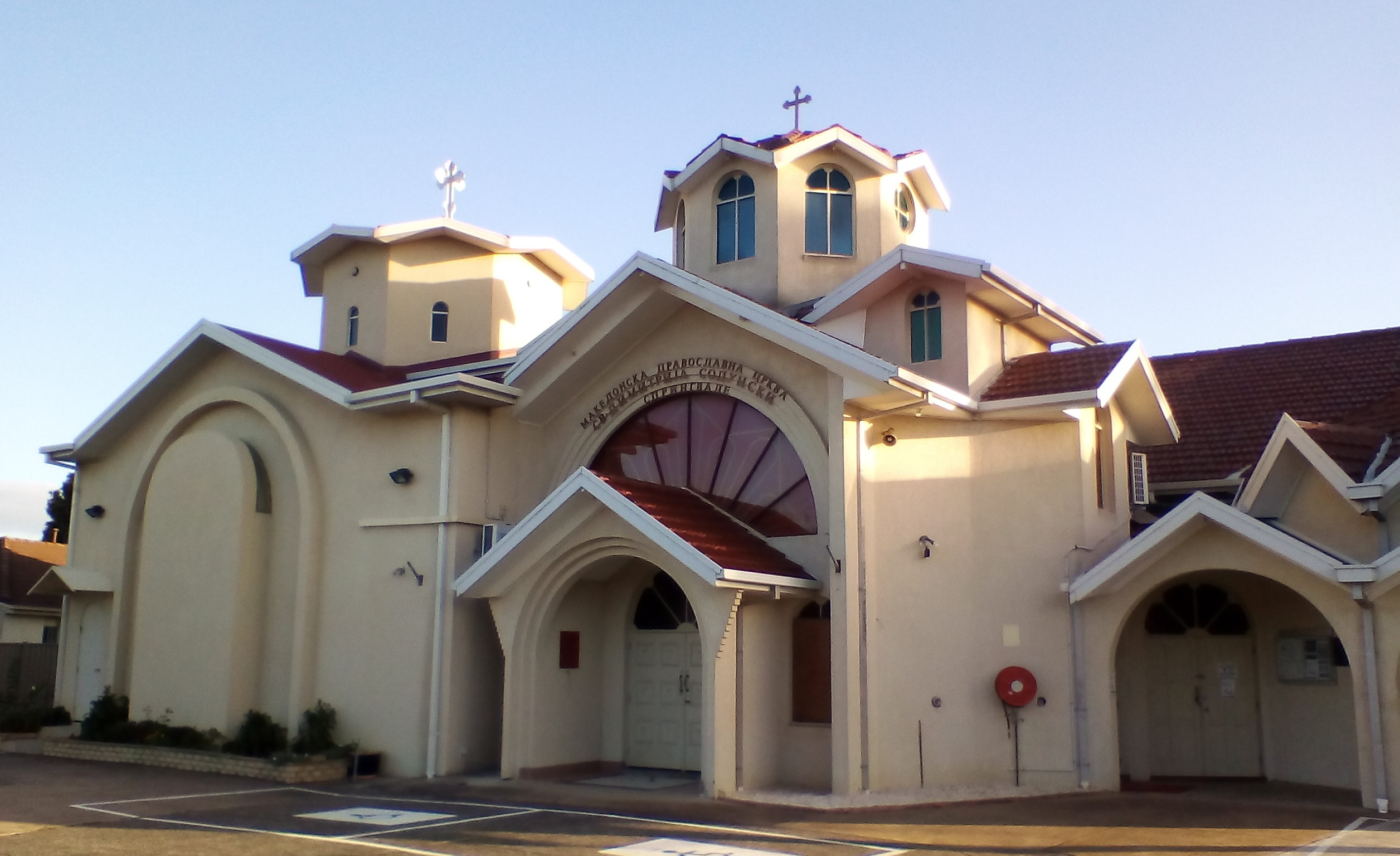

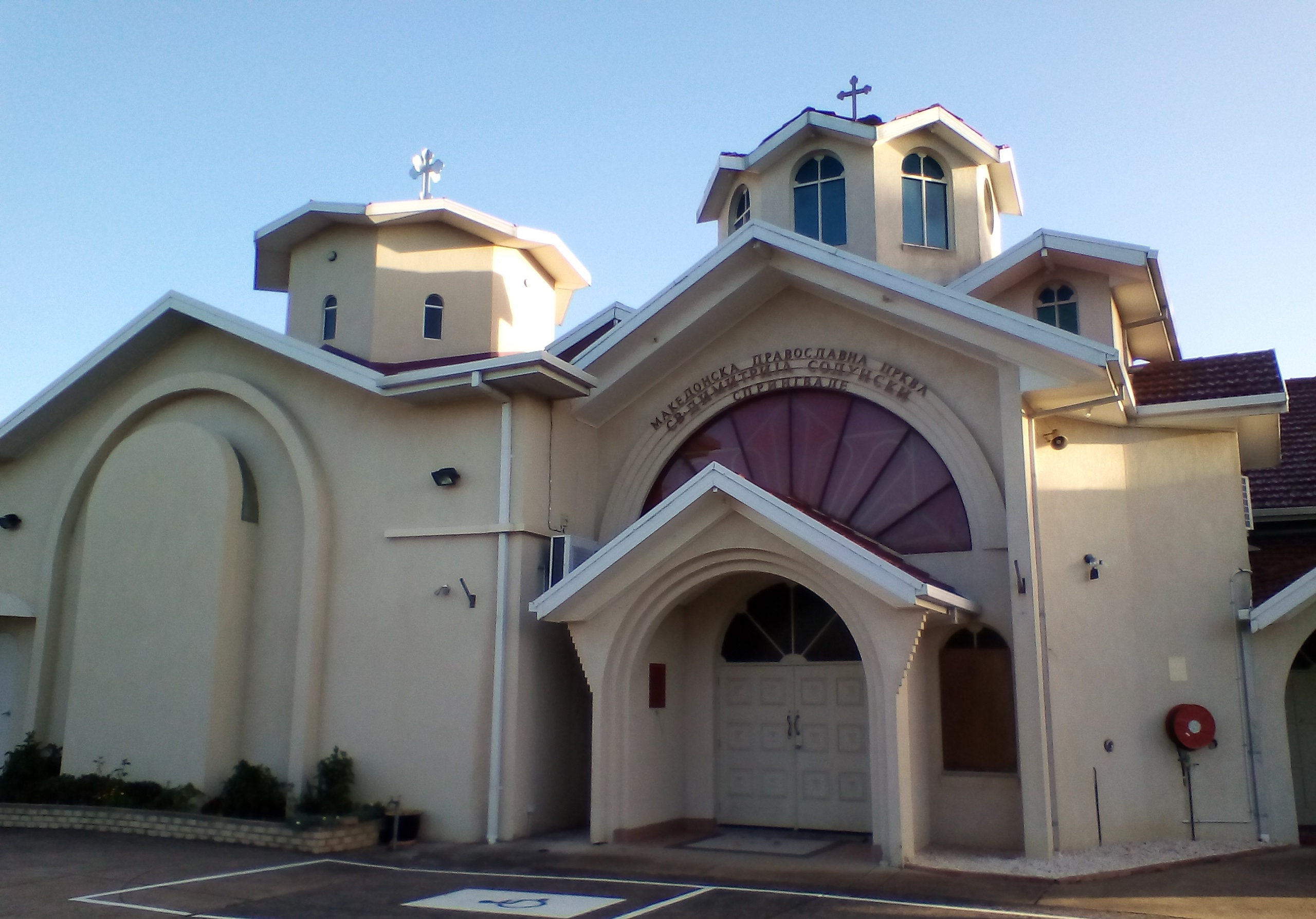

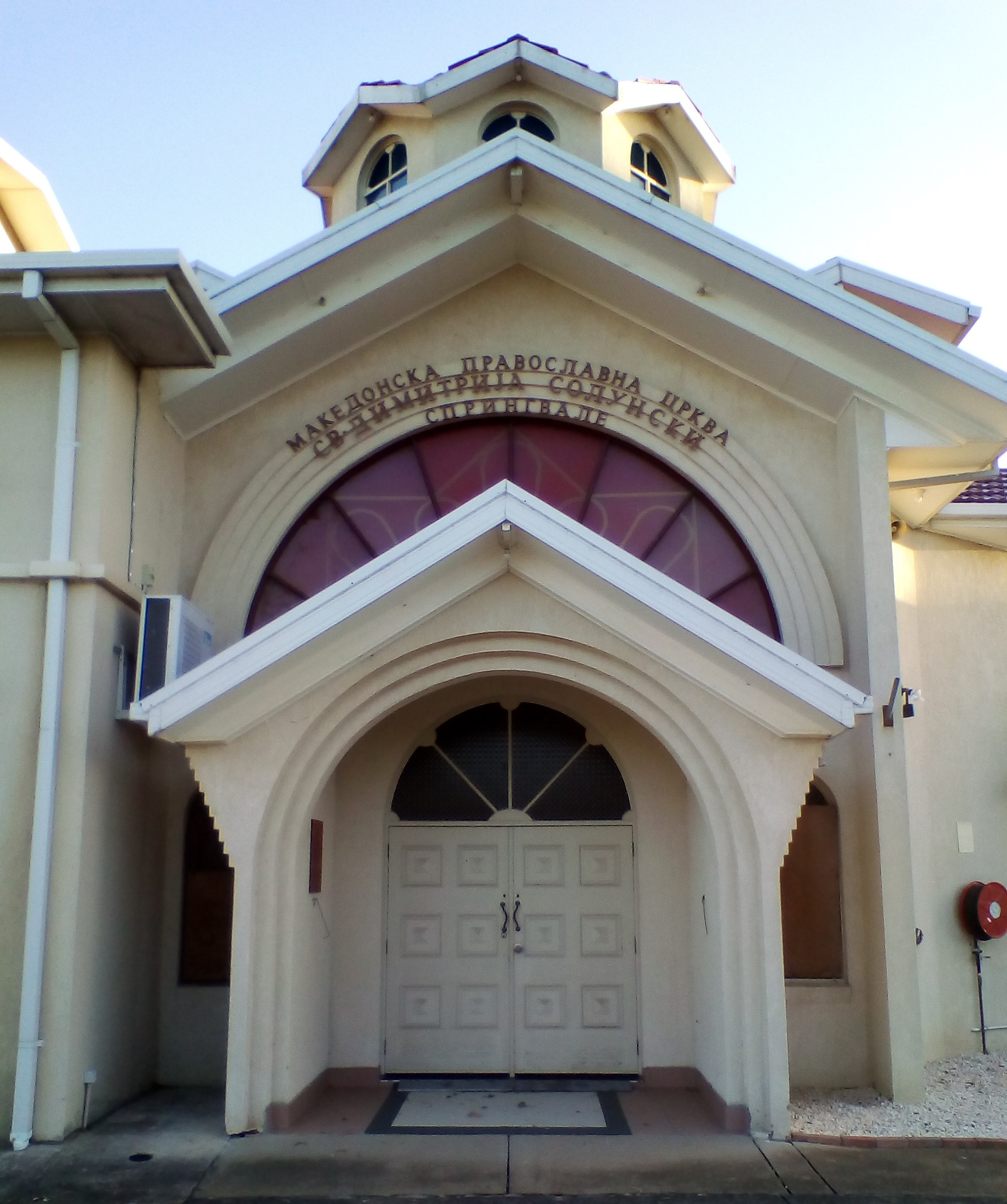

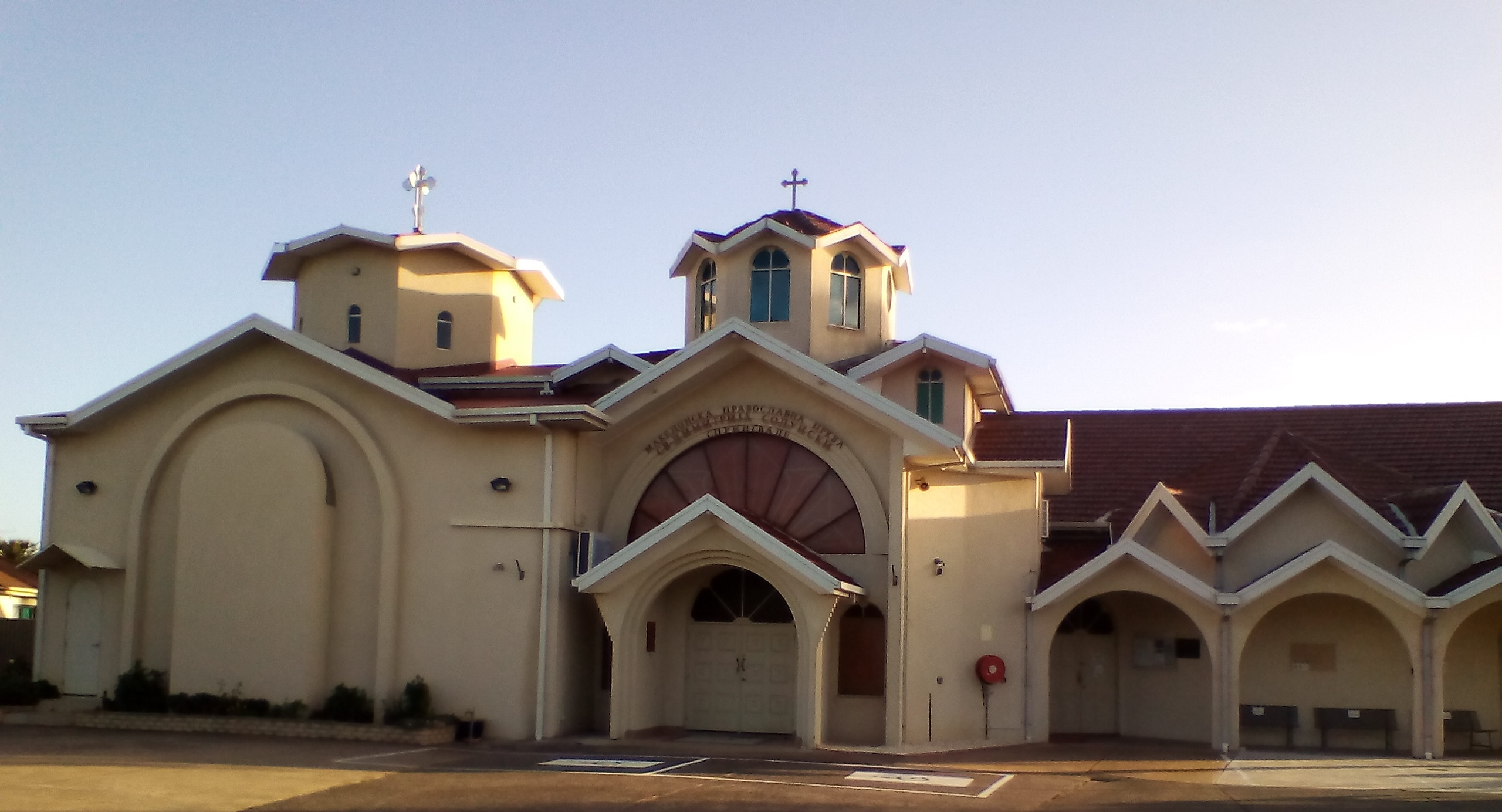

== See also ==
- Macedonian Australians
