= Macedonian Orthodox Diocese of Australia and New Zealand =

Diocese of the Macedonian Orthodox Church

Diocese of Australia and New Zealand Австралиско-Новозеландска Епархија

Location
- Territory: Australia, New Zealand
- Headquarters: North Macedonia

Information
- Denomination: Eastern Orthodox
- Established: 1981

Current leadership
- Bishop: Nikola (Trajkovski)

Website
- MOC Diocese of Australia and New Zealand

The Macedonian Orthodox Diocese of Australia and New Zealand (Macedonian: Австралиско-Новозеландска Епархија) is one of 10 dioceses of the Macedonian Orthodox Church (MOC). There are some 27 MOC churches in Australia. Almost half are under the Macedonian Orthodox diocese headed by Bishop Nikola (Trajkovski).

== History ==
The Macedonian Orthodox Church created its first diocese in 1967 for Macedonian diaspora communities that covered Canada, the United States, Australia and New Zealand. By 1981, the MOC split the diocese into two parts creating a diocese for Canada and the United States and another diocese for Australia and New Zealand. The diocese for Australia and New Zealand is headquartered in Melbourne. Metropolitan Tomotej of Debar-Kičevo served as its first administrator, succeeded in 1995 by Metropolitan Petar of Prespa-Pelagonija who has served in the role till present. The structure of the diocese is split into a number of regencies that are split as municipalities and church parishes. Regencies belonging to the archpriest are within Sydney (17 churches) and Melbourne (9 churches). Close to Melbourne and in the vicinity of King Lake, St. Kliment Ohridski - Chudotvorec is the first monastery founded in Australia by the Macedonian community.

Over some two decades the diocese experienced internal divisions regarding the matter of property ownership. In the context of Australian law, a sizable number of parishioners view themselves and not the MOC as owners of properties and churches in the country. During early 2012, people representing the parishes and municipalities who refuse Metropolitan Petar's legitimacy entered into negotiations with the MOC. Both sides agreed to a short-term solution which acknowledged each other. One group would be part of the jurisdiction of Metropolitan Petar and the other under the MOC and its Synod. The MOC synod convened a meeting whose outcome resulted in Metropolitan Timothy becoming the overseer of Macedonian parishes who do not support Metropolitan Petar in Australia. The number of parishes under Metropolitan Petar are 13. Both sides agreed to put on hold any legal processes in order to allow for time to reach a solution over a period of 3 years. In the late 2010s the situation had become formalised and the churches under Metropolitan Timothy are organised as the Macedonian Orthodox Diocese of Australia - Sydney.

== See also ==
- Assembly of Canonical Orthodox Bishops of Australia, New Zealand, and Oceania
