= Outline of North Macedonia =

Landlocked country in Southern Europe

The Flag of North Macedonia

The National emblem of North Macedonia

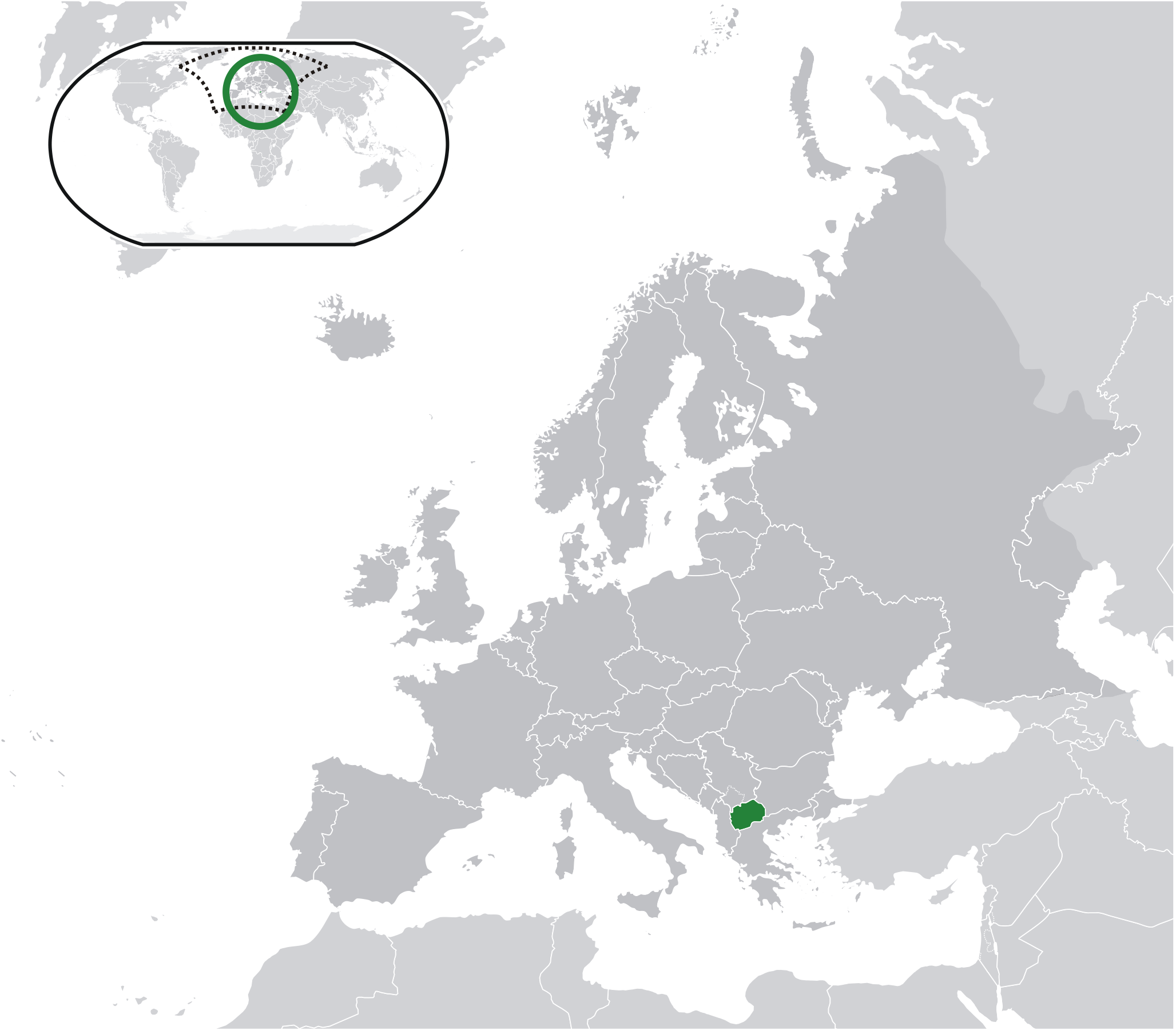
The location of North Macedonia

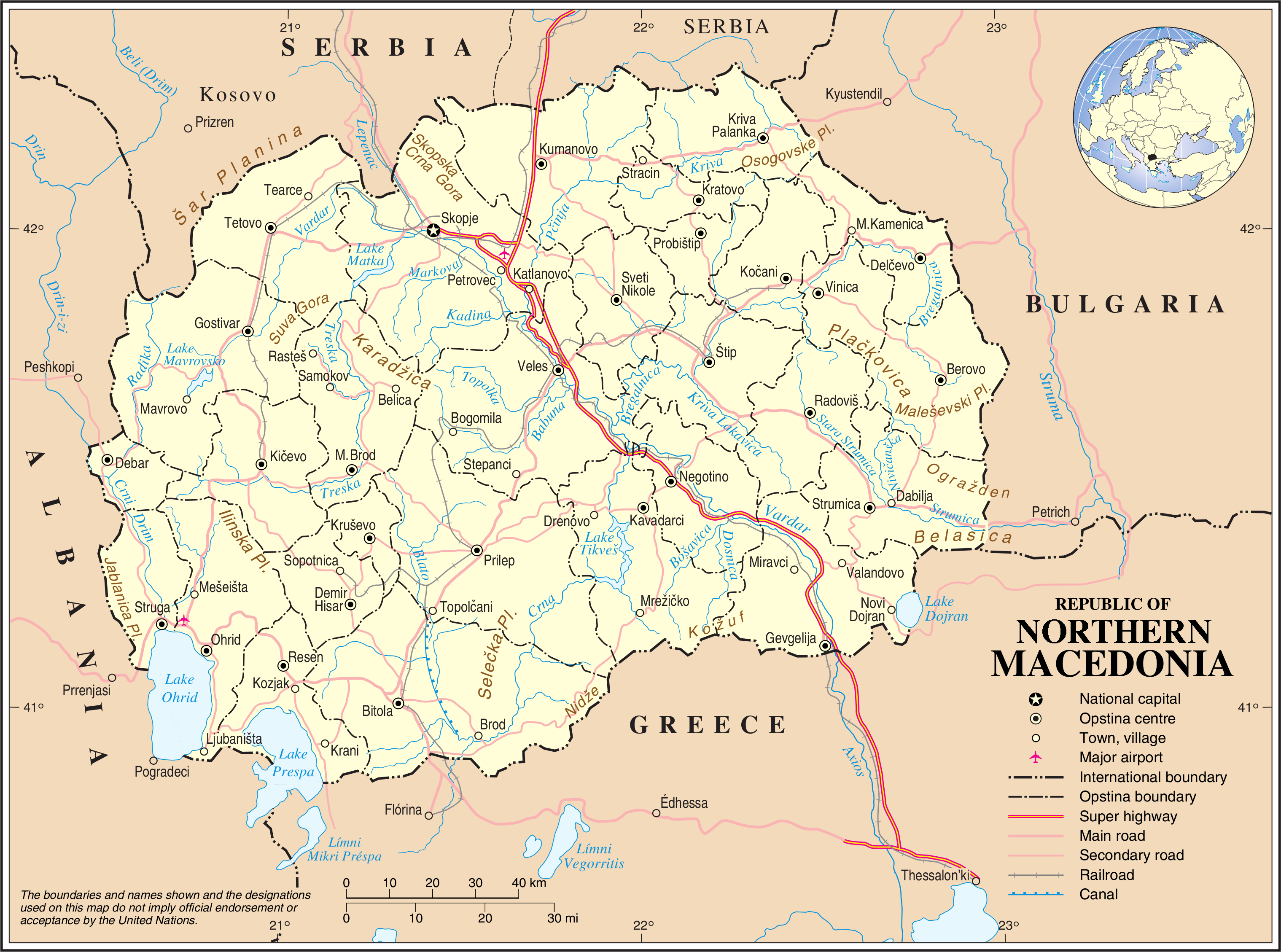
An enlargeable map of North Macedonia

The following outline is provided as an overview of and topical guide to North Macedonia:

North Macedonia is a landlocked sovereign country located on the Balkan Peninsula in Southern Europe. North Macedonia is bordered by Serbia and Kosovo to the north, Albania to the west, Greece to the south, and Bulgaria to the east.

North Macedonia forms approximately 35.8% of the land and 40.9% of the population of the wider geographical region of Macedonia, as it was defined in the late 19th century. The capital is Skopje, with 506,926 inhabitants according to a 2002 census, and there are a number of smaller cities, notably Bitola, Kumanovo, Prilep, Tetovo, Ohrid, Veles, Štip, Kočani, Gostivar and Strumica. It has more than 50 natural and artificial lakes and sixteen mountains higher than 2,000 meters (6,550 ft).

== General reference ==
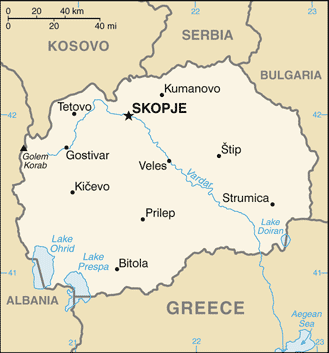
An enlargeable basic map of North Macedonia

- Common English country name: North Macedonia
- Pronunciation: /ˈnɔːrθmæsəˈdoʊniə/
- Official English country name: The Republic of North Macedonia
- Common endonym(s): Severna Makedonija – Северна Македонија
- Official endonym(s): Republika Severna Makedonija – Република Северна Македонија
- Adjectival(s): Macedonian
- Demonym(s): Macedonian
- Etymology: Greek: Μακεδονία, Makedonía, related to the ancient Greek word μακεδνός (Makednos)
- ISO country codes: MK, MKD, 807
- ISO region codes: See ISO 3166-2:MK
- Internet country code top-level domain: .mk

=== Geography of North Macedonia ===
- North Macedonia is: a country
- Location:
  - Eastern Hemisphere
  - Northern Hemisphere
    - Eurasia
      - Europe
        - Southern Europe
          - Balkans (also known as "Southeastern Europe")
  - Time zone: Central European Time (UTC+01), Central European Summer Time (UTC+02)
  - Extreme points of North Macedonia
    - High: Mount Korab (Golem Korab) 2,764 m (9,068 ft)
    - Low: Vardar 50 m (164 ft)
  - Land boundaries: 839 km

Albania 191 km
Kosovo 159 km
Serbia 62 km
Bulgaria 165 km
Greece 262 km

- Coastline: none

- Population of North Macedonia: 1,836,713 - 148th most populous country
- Area of North Macedonia:
- Atlas of North Macedonia

=== Environment of North Macedonia ===
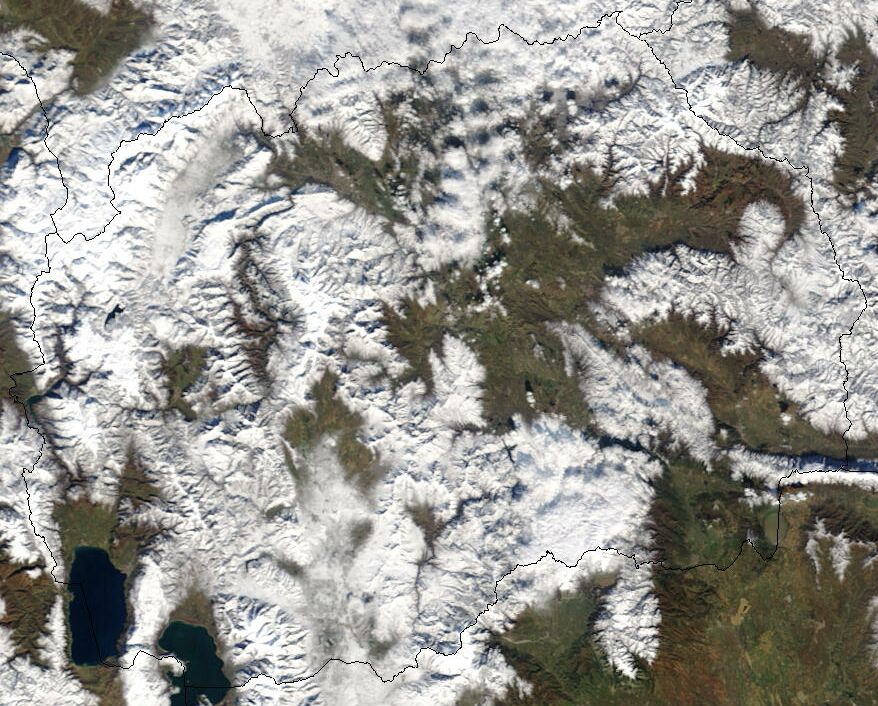
An enlargeable satellite image of North Macedonia

- Climate of North Macedonia
- Environmental issues in North Macedonia
- Renewable energy in North Macedonia
- Geology of North Macedonia
- Protected areas of North Macedonia
  - Biosphere reserves in North Macedonia
  - National parks of North Macedonia
- Wildlife of North Macedonia
  - Flora of North Macedonia
  - Fauna of North Macedonia
    - Birds of North Macedonia
    - Mammals of North Macedonia

==== Natural geographic features of North Macedonia ====
- Mountains of North Macedonia
- List of World Heritage sites in North Macedonia

=== Regions of North Macedonia ===
==== Administrative divisions of North Macedonia ====
- Capital of North Macedonia: Skopje
- List of cities in North Macedonia
- Municipalities of North Macedonia
- Statistical regions of North Macedonia

== Government and politics of North Macedonia ==
Politics of North Macedonia

- Form of government:
- Capital of North Macedonia: Skopje
- Elections in North Macedonia
- List of political parties in North Macedonia

=== Branches of the government of North Macedonia ===
==== Executive branch of the government of North Macedonia ====
- Head of state: President of North Macedonia,
- Head of government: Prime Minister of North Macedonia,
- Cabinet of North Macedonia

==== Legislative branch of the government of North Macedonia ====
- Parliament: Assembly of North Macedonia (unicameral)

==== Judicial branch of the government of North Macedonia ====
- Supreme Court of North Macedonia

=== Foreign relations of North Macedonia ===
- Diplomatic missions in North Macedonia
- Diplomatic missions of North Macedonia
- Greece–North Macedonia relations

==== International organization membership ====
North Macedonia is a member of:

- Bank for International Settlements (BIS)
- Central European Initiative (CEI)
- Council of Europe (CE)
- Euro-Atlantic Partnership Council (EAPC)
- European Bank for Reconstruction and Development (EBRD)
- Food and Agriculture Organization (FAO)
- International Atomic Energy Agency (IAEA)
- International Bank for Reconstruction and Development (IBRD)
- International Civil Aviation Organization (ICAO)
- International Criminal Court (ICCt)
- International Criminal Police Organization (Interpol)
- International Development Association (IDA)
- International Federation of Red Cross and Red Crescent Societies (IFRCS)
- International Finance Corporation (IFC)
- International Fund for Agricultural Development (IFAD)
- International Labour Organization (ILO)
- International Maritime Organization (IMO)
- International Monetary Fund (IMF)
- International Olympic Committee (IOC)
- International Organization for Migration (IOM) (observer)
- International Organization for Standardization (ISO)
- International Red Cross and Red Crescent Movement (ICRM)
- International Telecommunication Union (ITU)
- International Trade Union Confederation (ITUC)
- Inter-Parliamentary Union (IPU)
- Multilateral Investment Guarantee Agency (MIGA)
- North Atlantic Treaty Organization (NATO)
- Organisation internationale de la Francophonie (OIF)
- Organization for Security and Cooperation in Europe (OSCE)
- Organisation for the Prohibition of Chemical Weapons (OPCW)
- Partnership for Peace (PFP)
- Permanent Court of Arbitration (PCA)
- Southeast European Cooperative Initiative (SECI)
- United Nations (UN)
- United Nations Conference on Trade and Development (UNCTAD)
- United Nations Educational, Scientific, and Cultural Organization (UNESCO)
- United Nations High Commissioner for Refugees (UNHCR)
- United Nations Industrial Development Organization (UNIDO)
- United Nations Interim Force in Lebanon (UNIFIL)
- Universal Postal Union (UPU)
- World Confederation of Labour (WCL)
- World Customs Organization (WCO)
- World Federation of Trade Unions (WFTU)
- World Health Organization (WHO)
- World Intellectual Property Organization (WIPO)
- World Meteorological Organization (WMO)
- World Tourism Organization (UNWTO)
- World Trade Organization (WTO)
- World Veterans Federation

=== Law and order in North Macedonia ===
- Constitution of North Macedonia
- Crime in North Macedonia
- Human rights in North Macedonia
  - LGBT rights in North Macedonia
  - Freedom of religion in North Macedonia
- Law enforcement in North Macedonia
- Nationality law of North Macedonia
- North Macedonian passport
- Identity card of North Macedonia

=== Military of North Macedonia ===
- Command
  - Commander-in-chief:
    - Ministry of Defense of North Macedonia
    - Minister of Defense (North Macedonia)
- Forces
  - Army of North Macedonia
  - Macedonian Lake Patrol Police
  - North Macedonia Air Force
  - Special forces of North Macedonia
- Military history of North Macedonia
- Military ranks of North Macedonia

== History of North Macedonia ==
- Military history of North Macedonia

== Culture of North Macedonia ==
- Architecture of North Macedonia
- Cuisine of North Macedonia
- List of festivals in North Macedonia
- Languages of North Macedonia
- Media of North Macedonia
- National symbols of North Macedonia
  - Coat of arms: National emblem of North Macedonia
  - Flag of North Macedonia
  - National anthem of North Macedonia: Denes nad Makedonija
- People of North Macedonia
- Public holidays in North Macedonia
- List of records of North Macedonia
- Religion in North Macedonia
  - Christianity in North Macedonia
    - Orthodoxy in North Macedonia
      - Macedonian Orthodox Church
      - Orthodox Ohrid Archbishopric
    - Protestantism in North Macedonia
    - Catholicism in North Macedonia
      - Macedonian Greek Catholic Church
      - Roman Catholic Diocese of Skopje
  - Hinduism in North Macedonia
  - Islam in North Macedonia
  - Judaism in North Macedonia
  - Sikhism in North Macedonia
- List of World Heritage sites in North Macedonia

=== Art in North Macedonia ===
- Art in North Macedonia
- Cinema of North Macedonia
- Literature of North Macedonia
- Music of North Macedonia
- Television in North Macedonia
- Theatre in North Macedonia

=== Sports in North Macedonia ===
- Football in North Macedonia
- North Macedonia at the Olympics

== Economy and infrastructure of North Macedonia ==
- Economic rank, by nominal GDP (2007): 124th (one hundred and twenty fourth)
- Agriculture in North Macedonia
- Banking in North Macedonia
  - National Bank of North Macedonia
- Communications in North Macedonia
  - Internet in North Macedonia
- List of companies of North Macedonia
- Currency of North Macedonia: Denar
  - ISO 4217: MKD
- Energy in North Macedonia
  - Energy policy of North Macedonia
  - Oil industry in North Macedonia
- Health in North Macedonia
- Mining in North Macedonia
- Macedonia Stock Exchange
- Tourism in North Macedonia
- Transport in North Macedonia
  - List of airports in North Macedonia
  - Rail transport in North Macedonia
  - Roads in North Macedonia

== See also ==
- Index of North Macedonia-related articles
- List of North Macedonia-related topics
- List of international rankings
- Member state of the United Nations
- Outline of Europe
- Outline of geography
