= List of snakes in North Macedonia =

This is a list of snakes in North Macedonia. In the country there are 16 species of snakes, of which four are venomous.

== Snakes ==
There are 16 species of snakes in North Macedonia:

English name	Macedonian name	Scientific name	Image
Javelin sand boa	степски удав / песочница	Eryx jaculus	Javelin sand boa
Caspian whipsnake	жолт смок	Dolichophis caspius	Caspian whipsnake
Balkan whip snake	балкански смок	Hierophis gemonensis	Balkan whip snake
Dahl's whip snake	тенок стрелец / змија-џитка	Platyceps najadum	Dahl's whip snake
Smooth snake	планински смок	Coronella austriaca	Smooth snake
Aesculapian snake	шумски смок / Ескулапов смок	Zamenis longissimus	Aesculapian snake
Four-lined snake	ждрепка	Elaphe quatuorlineata	Four-lined snake
European ratsnake	леопардов смок	Zamenis situla	European ratsnake
Montpellier snake	длабочелен смок	Malpolon monspessulanus	Montpellier snake
Grass snake	белоушка	Natrix natrix	Grass snake
Dice snake	рибарка	Natrix tesellata	Dice snake
European cat snake	мачешка змија	Telescopus fallax	European cat snake
European blind snake	црвовидна змија	Typhlops vermicularis	European blind snake
Nose-horned Viper	поскок / камењарка	Vipera ammodytes	Horned viper
Common European adder	шарка, лутица / осојница	Vipera berus	Common European adder
Meadow viper	остроглава шарка / остроглава осојница	Vipera ursinii	Meadow viper

== See also ==
- Snakes
- Fauna of North Macedonia
