= Human rights in North Macedonia =

North Macedonia is a signatory to the European Convention on Human Rights and the U.N. Geneva Convention relating to the Status of Refugees and Convention against Torture, and the Constitution of North Macedonia guarantees basic human rights to all citizens.

There do however continue to be problems with human rights. According to human rights organisations, in 2003 there were suspected extrajudicial executions, threats and intimidation against human rights activists and anti-regime journalists and allegations of torture by the police.

== HRW and Helsinki Watch ==
According to Human Rights Watch, many former Yugoslav citizens remain "effectively stateless" as a result of a citizenship law drafted after North Macedonia's secession from the Socialist Federal Republic of Yugoslavia.

Conflict between ethnic Albanian secessionists and the government of North Macedonia has resulted in serious violations of human rights on both sides.

According to the International Helsinki Federation for Human Rights, the following human rights abuses have been reported:

- Police abuse of suspects, particularly during initial arrest and detention
- Police harassment of ethnic minorities, particularly Roma
- Impunity and corruption in the police force
- Political pressure on the judiciary
- Societal violence and discrimination against women, children and ethnic minorities, particularly Roma
- Trafficking in women and girls for sexual exploitation
- Government interference with union activity

== International rankings ==
- Democracy Index, 2020: 78 out of 167 ("hybrid regime")
- Worldwide Press Freedom Index, 2020: 92 out of 180.

== EC's Report ==
According to the European Commission's Report for 2020 has made considerable improvements compared to past reports, but it still struggles to achieve lasting change in key areas:

- Concerning the political criteria, North Macedonia continued to implement EU-related reforms throughout the reporting period. Efforts continued to strengthen democracy and the rule of law, including by activating existing checks and balances and through discussions and debates in key policy and legislative issues. Opposition parties remained engaged in the Parliament and supported key issues of common national interest, such as EU-related reforms and the NATO integration process, which North Macedonia joined in March 2020.
- The inter-ethnic situation remained calm overall. Efforts were made to strengthen inter-ethnic relations and to implement the Ohrid Framework Agreement, which ended the 2001 conflict and provides the framework for preserving the multi-ethnic character of the society.
- Civil society remains active and plays a key role in policy and decision-making processes. Measures have been taken to implement the 2018-2020 Strategy and Action Plan for the Cooperation between Government and Civil Society. However, efforts are needed to ensure a more meaningful and timely consultation process.
- The ongoing reform of the intelligence services resulted in the setting up in September 2019 of the National Security Agency, designed as an independent state body without police powers, unlike its predecessor the Bureau for Security and Counterintelligence (UBK). This is in line with recommendations of the Senior Experts’ Group on systemic rule of law issues. The Operational Technical Agency continued to function. Further efforts are needed to ensure that it has access to all necessary tools to fulfil its mandate. The capacity for parliamentary oversight over the intelligence services needs to be strengthened.
- North Macedonia is moderately prepared with the reform of its public administration. Some progress was made in improving transparency, with the adoption of the 2019-2021 Transparency Strategy, the operationalisation of the open government data portal and the publication of data on government spending. The monitoring reports on implementation of the Public Administration Reform Strategy and the Public Financial Management Reform Programme were produced and accompanied by adequate visibility actions. Ensuring respect for the principles of transparency, merit and equitable representation remains essential. The State Commission for Prevention of Corruption continued to address allegations of nepotism, cronyism and political influence in the process of recruitment of public sector employees. A proper follow-up to the reports and recommendations of the State Commission needs to be ensured.
- The judicial system of North Macedonia has some level of preparation/is moderately prepared. There was good progress in the implementation of the judicial reform strategy, thereby addressing the ‘Urgent Reform Priorities’ and recommendations from the Venice Commission and the Senior Experts’ Group on systemic Rule of Law issues. Efforts are still needed to ensure systematic implementation of the updated action plan of the judicial reform strategy. Judicial institutions are implementing new rules for appointment, promotion, discipline and dismissal of judges and the Judicial Council has been exercising its role more pro-actively. As a result of its reform efforts in recent years, North Macedonia has established mechanisms to ensure judicial independence and accountability, such as rules on merit-based appointments, checking assets and conflicts of interest and disciplinary procedures. It should ensure their determined and consistent use before envisaging further changes in this area. Effective implementation of the legal framework as well as increased efforts by all stakeholders to demonstrate their exemplarity will contribute to increasing public trust in the judiciary.
- As regards the fight against corruption, North Macedonia has some level of preparation/is moderately prepared. Good progress was made through consolidating its track record on investigating, prosecuting and trying high level corruption cases. The State Commission for Prevention of Corruption has been particularly pro-active in preventing corruption and opened a high number of cases, including those involving high-level officials from across the political spectrum, in line with last year's recommendation. Efforts continue to move forward with the Special Prosecutor's Office cases and establish accountability for the illegal wiretaps. The former Chief Special Prosecutor was convicted in June 2020 in the first instance verdict in the so-called ‘racket case’ concerning alleged extortion and abuse of office in relation to a case of the Special Prosecutor's Office. Corruption is prevalent in many areas and a more proactive approach from all actors engaged in preventing and fighting corruption needs to be ensured.
- The country has some level of preparation in the fight against organised crime. The legislative framework is broadly in line with European standards, and efforts to implement strategies against organised crime must continue. Some progress was made in meeting last year's recommendation to establish an asset recovery office in line with the EU acquis. The office will now have to demonstrate its capacity to support a proactive policy of asset confiscation. The country is engaged in threat assessment at the regional level, and will have to broaden its scope in line with the EU practices. There is some progress at the operational level, but more needs to be done to improve the effectiveness of law enforcement in fighting specific forms of crime, such as money laundering and financial crimes. The cooperation with Europol is increasing across the different criminal areas. Coordination remains crucial for all stakeholders involved in fighting organised crime. Some progress has been made in the fight against terrorism and preventing/countering violent extremism in line with the objectives set out in the Joint Action Plan on counter-terrorism for the Western Balkans and the bilateral implementing arrangement.
- The legal framework on the protection of fundamental rights is largely in line with European standards. The deinstitutionalisation process is under way and resettlement of children to community-based care is being carried out. The Ministry of Labour and Social Policy is investing in community services, including to support victims of gender-based violence. It is essential that these services continue to be made available. Additional efforts are needed to address recommendations of European and international human rights bodies, particularly regarding the treatment of detained and convicted persons. The Constitutional Court's decision to repeal the Law on Prevention and Protection against Discrimination on procedural grounds means that the country currently lacks a comprehensive legal framework on non-discrimination and an equality body. This serious gap needs to be addressed by the new legislature. It is also important for the country to enhance implementation of the legislation on hate speech and of the national action plan for implementation of the Istanbul Convention. While the set-up of the external oversight mechanism of the police is complete, the absence of genuinely independent investigators may impede the work of the unit to effectively address police impunity. The country should take urgent measures to further improve the situation in prisons and to support alternatives to detention.
- The country has some level of preparation / is moderately prepared in the area of freedom of expression and has made limited progress during the reporting period. The overall situation and climate in which media operates remain generally conducive to media freedom and allow for critical media reporting, although there have been some increased tensions during the COVID-19 crisis and in the context of the elections. Self-regulation efforts need to be intensified to support advancement in professional standards and the quality of journalism. It is important to ensure greater transparency of media advertising by state institutions, political parties and public enterprises. Sustainable solutions to ensure the public service broadcaster's independence, professional standards and financial sustainability are needed. It is essential to continue supporting media pluralism, promoting professionalism, unbiased reporting and investigative journalism, and building resilience to effectively combat disinformation. The financial sustainability of independent media and working conditions of journalists remain a challenge.
- North Macedonia continues to play an active and constructive role in the management of mixed migration flows. It remains on one of the main transit routes for mixed movement. It cooperates effectively with neighbouring countries and EU Member States, including with guest officers from the EU Member States on the ground. Considerable efforts to ensure basic living conditions and services for all migrants staying in the country continued. The registration of migrants and adequate protection-sensitive profiling improved but needs to be carried out in a more systematic manner. The Status Agreement with the European Border and Coast Guard Agency has not been signed yet. The problem of frequent smuggling activities at the northern border needs to be further addressed.

== Historical situation ==
The following chart shows North Macedonia's ratings since 1992 in the Freedom in the World reports, published annually by Freedom House. A rating of 1 is "free"; 7, "not free".^{1}

Historical ratings

Year	Political Rights	Civil Liberties	Status	President^{2}^{3}
1992	3	4	Partly Free	Kiro Gligorov
1993	3	3	Partly Free	Kiro Gligorov
1994	4	3	Partly Free	Kiro Gligorov
1995	4	3	Partly Free	Kiro Gligorov
1996	4	3	Partly Free	Kiro Gligorov
1997	4	3	Partly Free	Kiro Gligorov
1998	3	3	Partly Free	Kiro Gligorov
1999	3	3	Partly Free	Kiro Gligorov
2000	4	3	Partly Free	Boris Trajkovski
2001	4	4	Partly Free	Boris Trajkovski
2002	3	3	Partly Free	Boris Trajkovski
2003	3	3	Partly Free	Boris Trajkovski
2004	3	3	Partly Free	Boris Trajkovski
2005	3	3	Partly Free	Branko Crvenkovski
2006	3	3	Partly Free	Branko Crvenkovski
2007	3	3	Partly Free	Branko Crvenkovski
2008	3	3	Partly Free	Branko Crvenkovski
2009	3	3	Partly Free	Branko Crvenkovski
2010	3	3	Partly Free	Gjorge Ivanov
2011	3	3	Partly Free	Gjorge Ivanov
2012	3	3	Partly Free	Gjorge Ivanov
2013	3	3	Partly Free	Gjorge Ivanov
2014	4	3	Partly Free	Gjorge Ivanov
2015	4	3	Partly Free	Gjorge Ivanov
2016	4	3	Partly Free	Gjorge Ivanov
2017	4	3	Partly Free	Gjorge Ivanov
2018	4	3	Partly Free	Gjorge Ivanov
2019	3	3	Partly Free	Gjorge Ivanov
2020	3	3	Partly Free	Stevo Pendarovski
2021^{4}	3	3	Partly Free	Stevo Pendarovski

== See also ==
- Albanians in North Macedonia
- Bulgarians in North Macedonia
- Greeks in North Macedonia
- Serbs in North Macedonia
- LGBT rights in North Macedonia
- Internet censorship and surveillance in North Macedonia
- Ohrid Agreement
- Accession of North Macedonia to the European Union

== Notes ==
1.Note that the "Year" signifies the "Year covered". Therefore the information for the year marked 2008 is from the report published in 2009, and so on.
2.As of January 1.
3.North Macedonia is a parliamentary republic; the presidency is considered a ceremonial position, with the prime minister and parliament holding most of the legislative power.
4.On the Freedom House spreadsheet, the ratings for every country from North Macedonia through North Korea are applied to the country that precedes it alphabetically, with North Macedonia's ratings (3 for both civil and political rights) being applied to North Korea. North Macedonia is listed as beginning with the letter “M” (as in “Macedonia, North”), whereas North Korea is listed as beginning with the letter “N”; hence, every country beginning with the letters "M" and "N" (excluding Norway) are affected.
