= Protestantism in North Macedonia =

Religious denomination

It is estimated that Protestantism is practised by 61,358 or roughly 3% of the total population of North Macedonia in 2016.

== History ==
In the late 19th and early 20th century many American missionaries working from Ottoman Salonika converted a number of villages in the Strumica region to Methodism. These villages still retain the Methodist faith. Baptist work existed in then Vardar Banovina as early as 1928. The Union of Baptist Christians was organized in 1991. It is a member of the European Baptist Federation and the Baptist World Alliance. It is estimated that Protestantism is practised by 61,358 or roughly 3% of the total population in 2016.

Many Methodists emigrated in the 1960s and 1970s. A number of these came to Australia. There is a Macedonian parish of the Uniting Church operating in Wood Street, East Preston. There is also a Macedonian Baptist community in Regent.

== Notable people ==
- Boris Trajkovski - former President of Macedonia

== See also ==
- Religion in North Macedonia
- Catholic Church in North Macedonia
- Macedonian Orthodox Church
