= Religion in North Macedonia =

Religion in North Macedonia (2021 Census Results)
1. Eastern Orthodoxy (46.1%)
2. Catholicism (0.37%)
3. Other Christian (13.9%)
4. Islam (32.2%)
5. None (0.13%)
6. Others (predominantly Orthodox Macedonians as per registries) (7.27%)

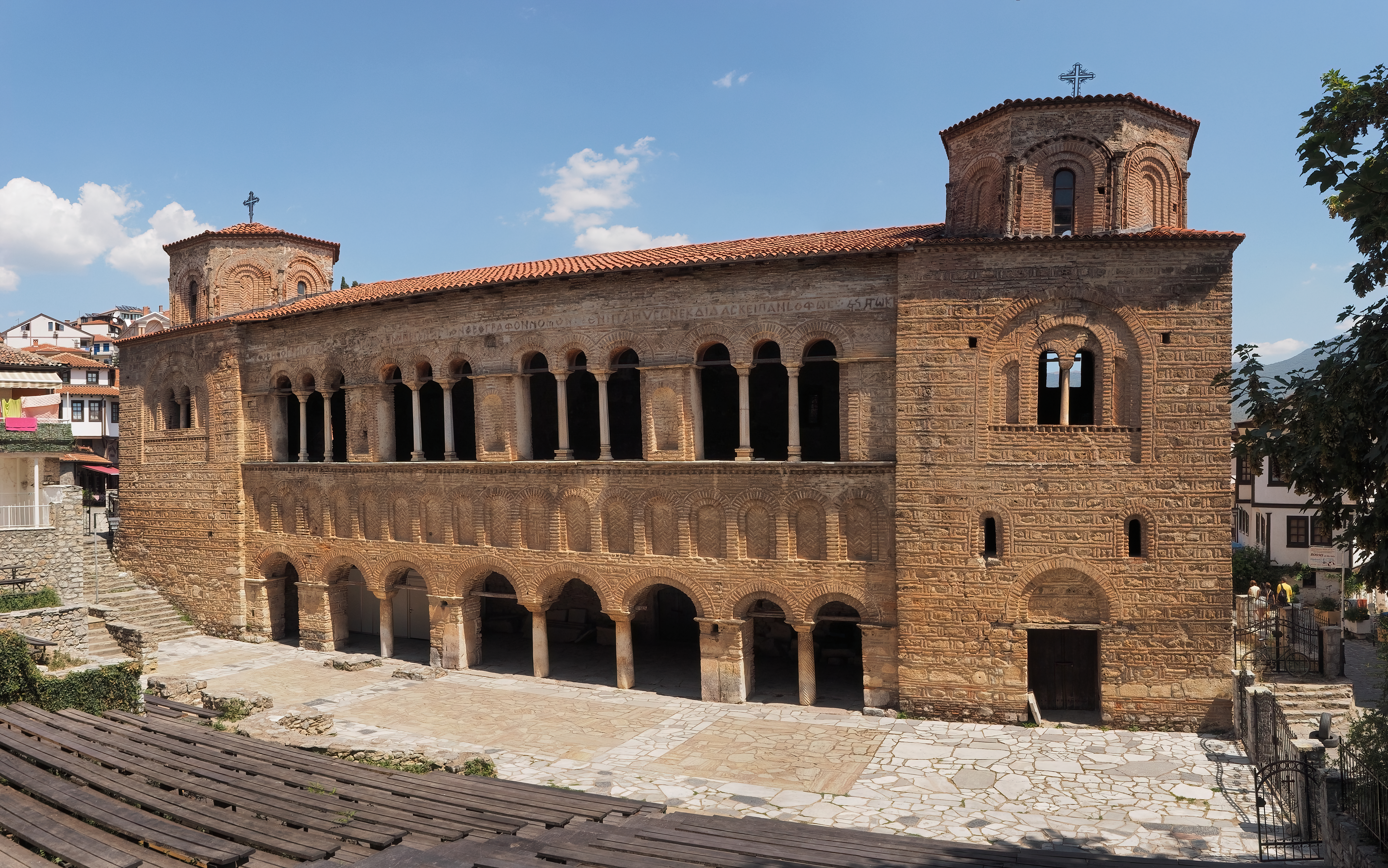
Church of St. Sophia in Ohrid.

In North Macedonia, the most common religion is Orthodox Christianity, practiced mainly by Macedonians, Serbs, and Aromanians. The vast majority of the Eastern Orthodox in the country belong to the Macedonian Orthodox Church, which declared autocephaly from the Serbian Orthodox Church in 1967.

Muslims are the second-largest religious group with almost one-third of the population adhering to Islam, mainly from the country's Albanian, Roma, Turkish, Bosniak, and Torbeš population. There are also many other religious groups in North Macedonia, including Catholicism, Protestantism, and Judaism.

== Demographics history ==
In 2011, through a survey carried out by Ipsos MORI, the religious composition of North Macedonia was found to be 70.7% Christian, divided in 69.6% Eastern Orthodox and 0.4% Catholics and Protestants, and 28.6% Muslim, with unaffiliated Muslims making up the 25.6%.

According to the 2021 official census, the religious composition of North Macedonia was 60.44% Christian of all denominations, 32.17% Muslim, 0.59% atheist or agnostic, and 7.26% other or undefined (predominantly Orthodox Macedonians as per registries).

== Christianity ==
=== Eastern Orthodoxy ===
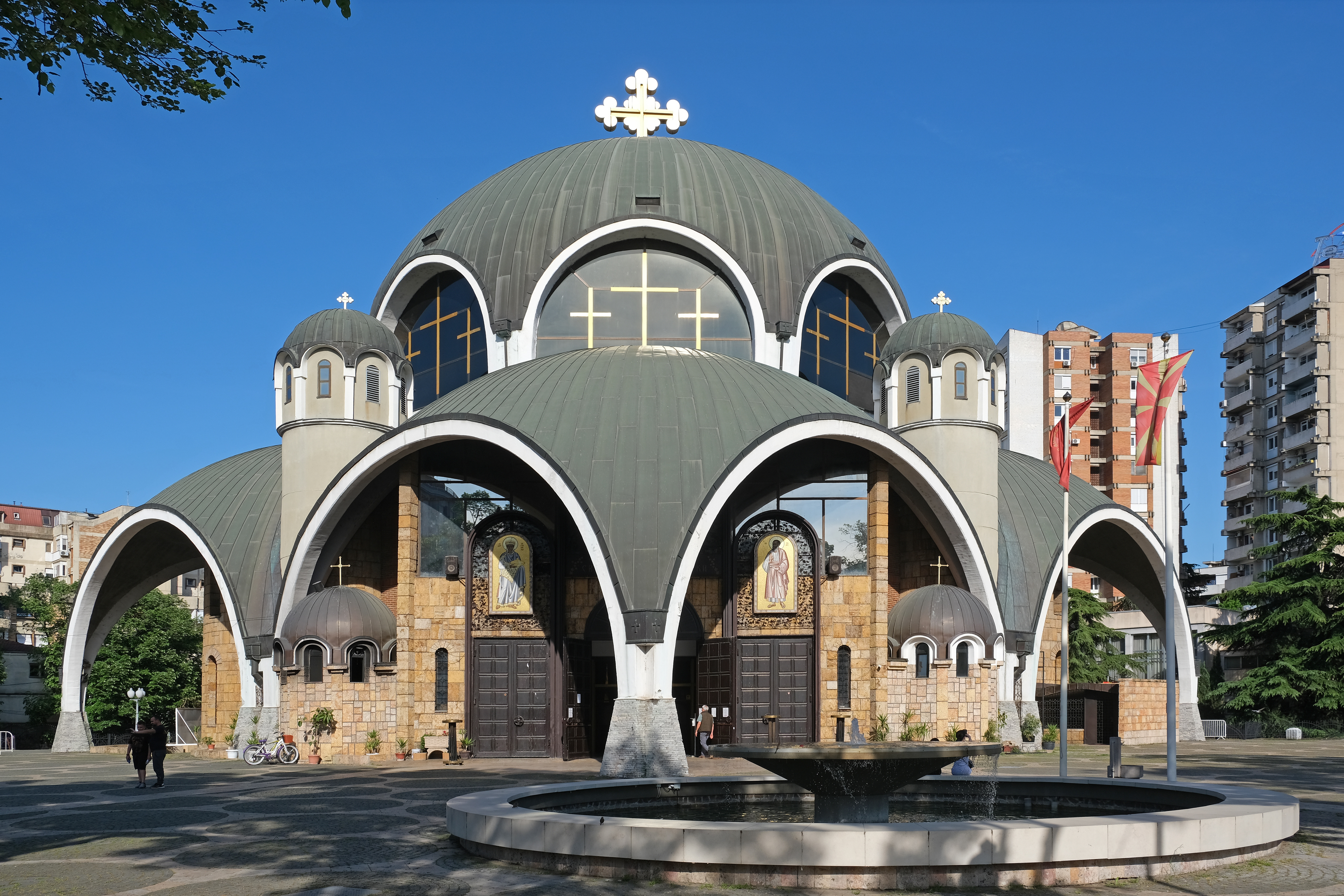
Church of St. Clement of Ohrid in Skopje.

Eastern Orthodoxy has had a long history in North Macedonia, and remains the majority religion. In 1019 the Archbishopric of Ohrid was established. In 1767 on order of the Sultan, the Archbishopric was abolished by the Ottoman authorities and annexed to the Patriarchate of Constantinople. Throughout the 19th and 20th centuries there was an effort to reinstate the Archbishopric of Ohrid. The Macedonian Orthodox Church gained autonomy from the Serbian Orthodox Church in 1959 and declared the restoration of the Archbishopric of Ohrid. On July 19, 1967, the Macedonian Orthodox Church declared autocephaly from the Serbian Orthodox Church. Most Macedonians belong to the Orthodox faith. In 2001 the Church had about 1,350,000 adherents in North Macedonia. The Serbian Orthodox Church congregates primarily the ethnic Macedonian Serbs.

=== Catholicism ===
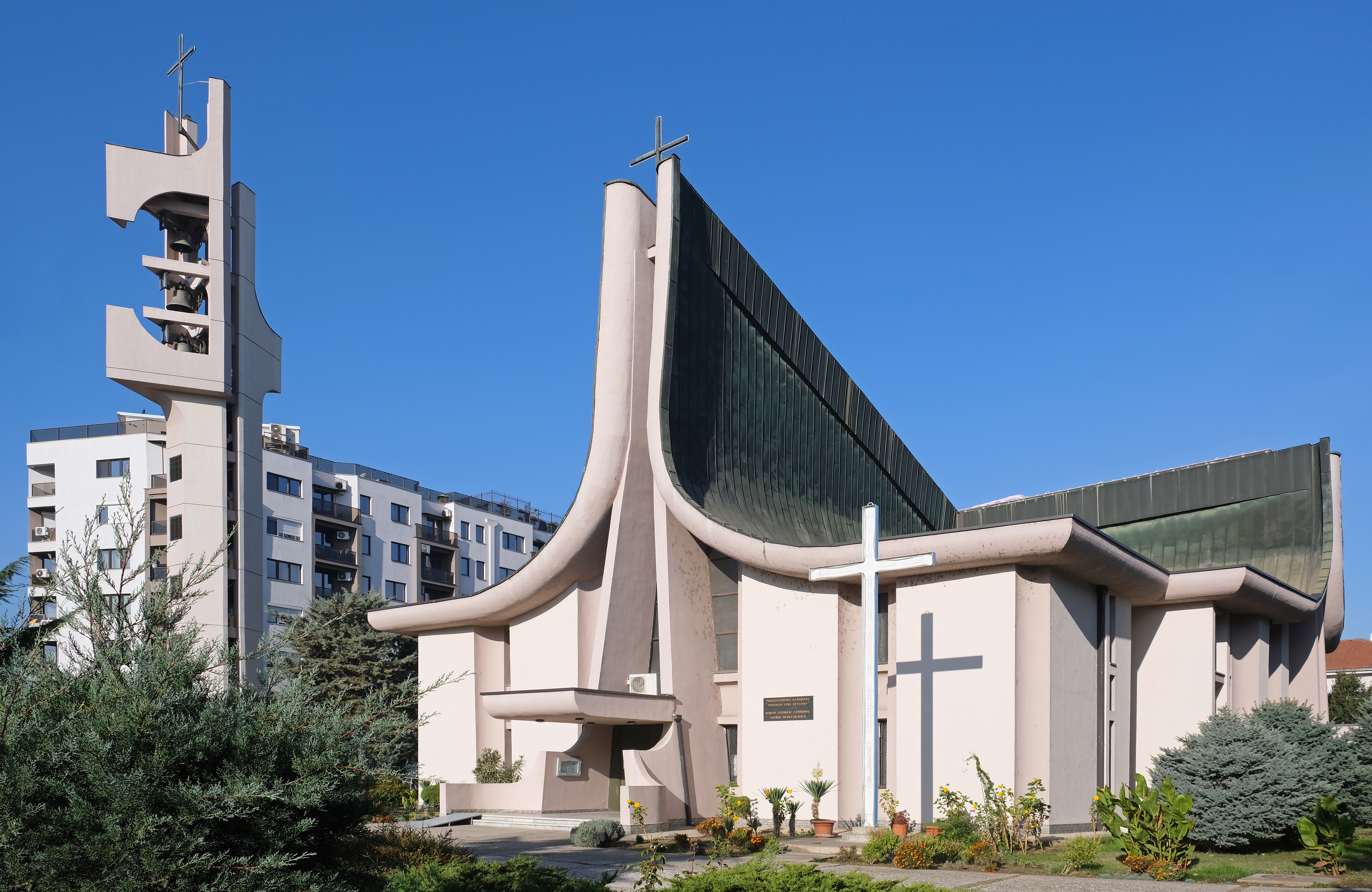
Cathedral of the Sacred Heart of Jesus in Skopje.

In 2001 the Holy See established the Byzantine Catholic Apostolic Exarchate of Macedonia. Currently, members of the Macedonian Catholic Church number about 11,266. It is a Byzantine Rite sui juris particular church in full communion with Pope and the rest of the Catholic Church, alongside the Eastern Catholic Churches and uses Macedonian in the liturgy. The census of 2021 registered 6,746 Catholics.

=== Protestantism ===
There are a number of Protestants in North Macedonia. In the late 19th and early 20th centuries, American missionaries converted villages in the Strumica-Petrich region to Methodism, a faith still practiced. There is also a small community of Macedonian Baptists which has existed since 1928.

== Islam ==
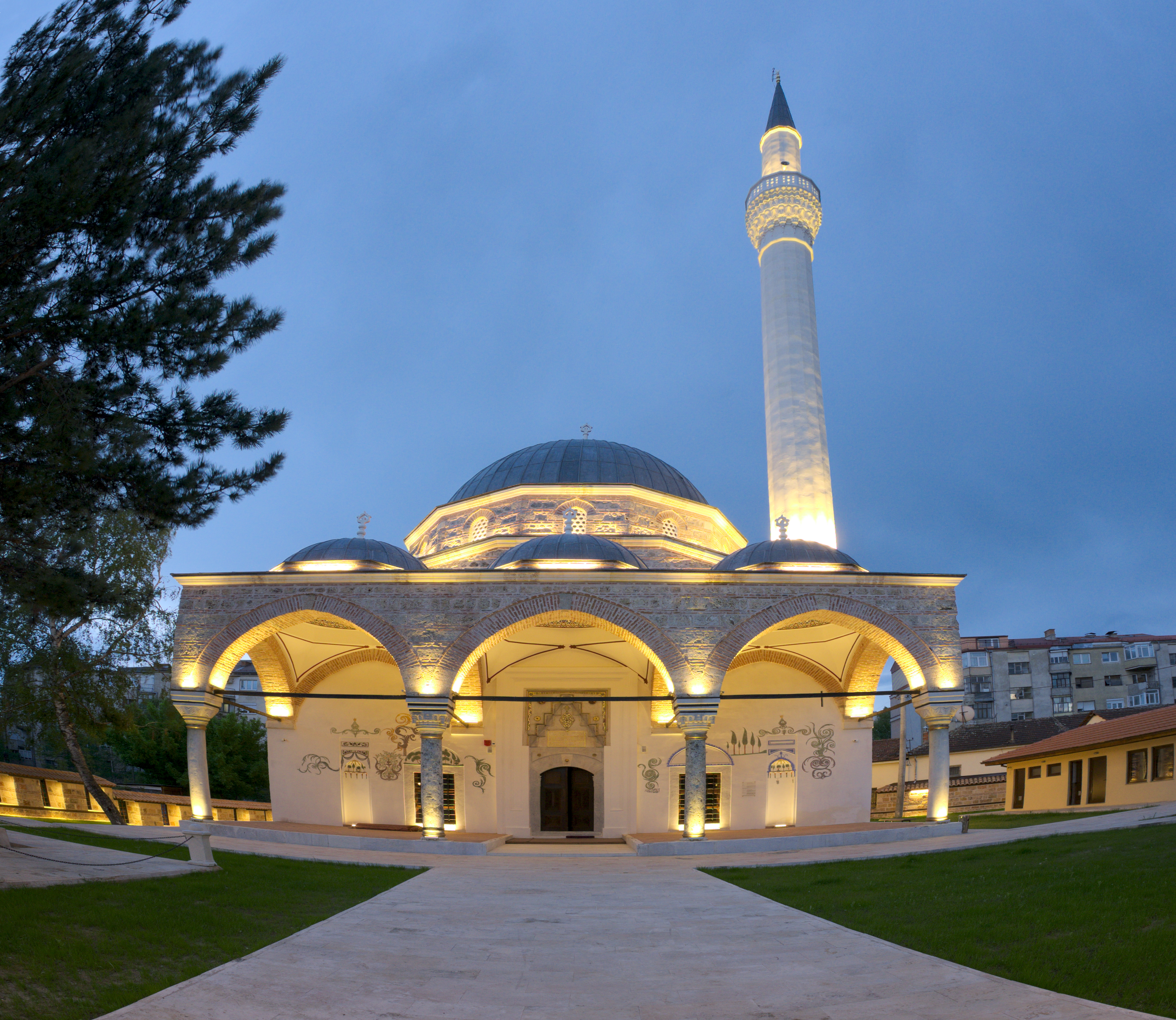
Gazi Hajdar Kadi Mosque in Bitola.

Islam has had a significant influence in North Macedonia since the Ottoman conquests in the 14th and 15th centuries. Many Turks settled in the region of Macedonia and introduced aspects of Islamic culture. Most Albanians and some ethnic Macedonians converted to Islam. These Macedonian Muslims or Torbeši generally retained their Macedonian culture and customs while many were assimilated as Turks. By the 19th Century most of the cities were primarily populated by Muslims. The Šarena Džamija in Tetovo is a legacy of the country's Ottoman past. In 2002, Muslims form approximately 33.33% of the nation's total population. According to the census of 2021, the share of Muslims was 32.17% of the total (resident) population, which was slightly lower compared to 33.33% in the census of 2002.

== Judaism ==
The Sephardic Jewish Synagogue in Bitola prior to World War II

Jews had been present when the region now called the Republic of North Macedonia was under Roman rule in the second century AD. The population was decimated by the Crusades, but rose again following the immigration of Sephardic Jews under the Ottoman Empire. In the Second World War, North Macedonia was occupied by Bulgaria, an Axis power, and the Jews were sent to concentration camps. As in the rest of the Balkans, the Holocaust and immigration to Israel means that North Macedonia now has a much smaller Jewish community, numbering roughly 200. It is mainly based in the capital, Skopje, and has no functioning synagogue. The census of 2021 registered 74 "Members of the Jewish (Moses) community", with Jewish men forming the majority of this community (42 males compared to 32 females).

== Religious freedom ==
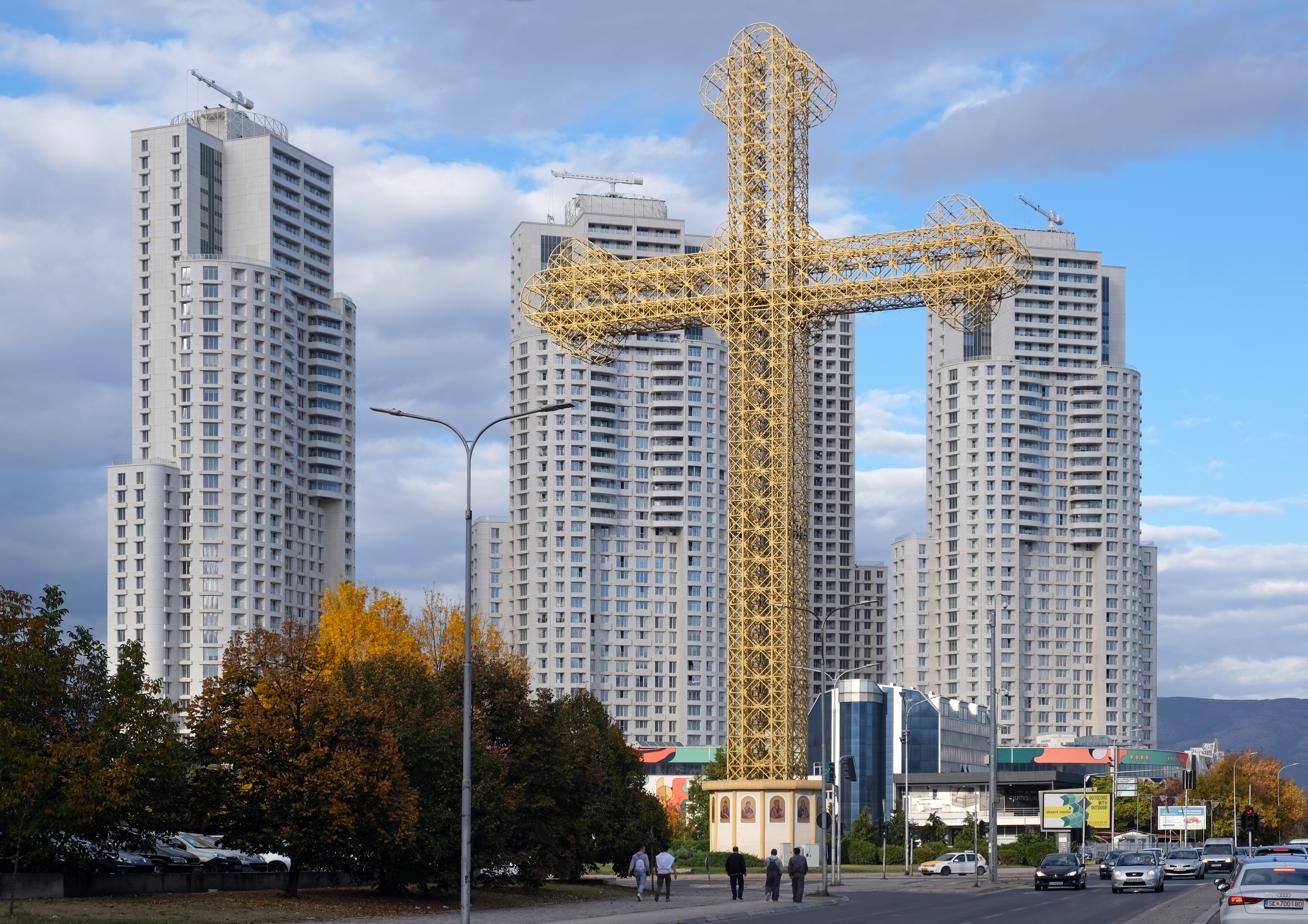
Macedonian Cross and Cevahir Towers in Skopje.

The laws of North Macedonia prohibit religious discrimination and provide for equal rights for all citizens regardless of their religious beliefs, and people generally have the freedom to practice their religion without disruption. Religious organizations have complained about unfair treatment by the government around questions of building permits and property restitutions. There have been incidences of vandalism and theft against religious buildings.

== See also ==
- Demographics of North Macedonia
- Hinduism in North Macedonia

== Sources ==
- Dragojlović, Dragoljub (1991). "Archevéché d'Ohrid dans la hiérarchie des grandes églises chrétiennes" (PDF). Balcanica (22): 43–55.
- Kiminas, Demetrius (2009). The Ecumenical Patriarchate: A History of Its Metropolitanates with Annotated Hierarch Catalogs. Wildside Press LLC. ISBN 9781434458766.
- Runciman, Steven (1968). The Great Church in Captivity: A Study of the Patriarchate of Constantinople from the Eve of the Turkish Conquest to the Greek War of Independence (1. ed.). Cambridge: Cambridge University Press. ISBN 9780521071888.
- Stanković, Vlada, ed. (2016). The Balkans and the Byzantine World before and after the Captures of Constantinople, 1204 and 1453. Lanham, Maryland: Lexington Books. ISBN 9781498513265.
