= Fauna of North Macedonia =

Native animals of North Macedonia

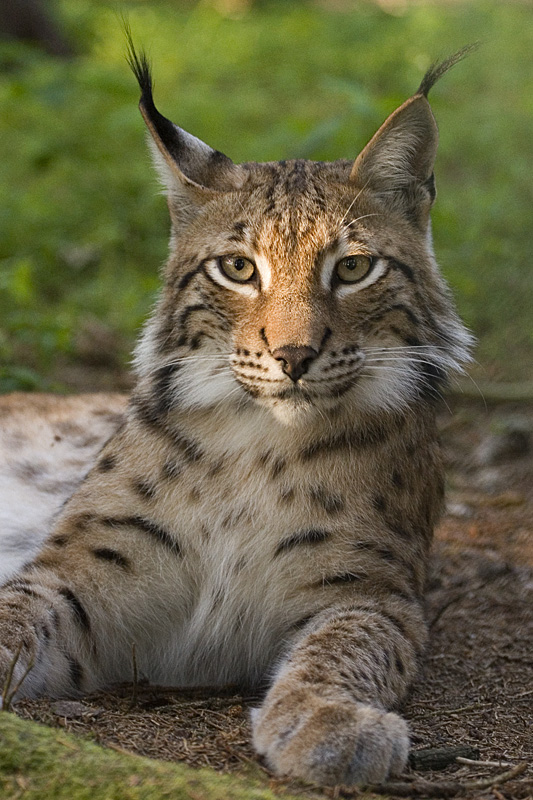
The Eurasian lynx can be found in North Macedonia.

The fauna of North Macedonia has a complex zoogeographical structure. It contains faunal elements of different origins and is characterized by a high degree of relict and endemic forms. Taxonomic diversity is also present; the total number of animal species reported until now is 10,354.

The fauna of Macedonian forests is abundant and includes bears, wild boars, wolves, foxes, squirrels, chamois and deer. The lynx is found, although very rarely, in the mountains of western North Macedonia, while deer can be found in the region of Demir Kapija. Forest birds include the blackcap, the grouse, the black grouse, the imperial eagle and the forest owl.

Phylum	Species number	Endemism
Protozoa	113 (2015)	32
Porifera	10 (2015)	6 (2015)
Platyhelminthes	229 (2015)	35
Cnidaria	3 (2015)	
Rotifera	269 (2015)	
Nematoda	>600 (2015)	
Acanthocephala	8 (2015)	
Nemertea	1 (2015)	
Nematomorpha	2 (2015)	
Annelida	175 (2015)	48
Mollusca	301 (Gastropoda); 19 (Bivalvia) (2015)	131
Arthropoda	~11,800 (2015)	383
Chordata	82 (Mammalia, 2003); 318 (Aves, 2017); 14 (Amphibia, 2016); 33 (Reptilia, 2016); 80 (freshwater fish, 2025)	30

== See also ==
- List of snakes in North Macedonia
- Flora of North Macedonia
