= List of mammals of North Macedonia =

This list shows the IUCN Red List status of the 56 mammal species occurring in North Macedonia. Nine are vulnerable and three are near threatened.

Icons which state each species' global IUCN status:
VU	Vulnerable	Facing a high risk of extinction in the wild
NT	Near Threatened	Doesn't meet any of the criteria that would categorise it as risking extinction but likely to in the future
LC	Least Concern	No current identifiable risks to this species

== Order: Rodentia (rodents) ==
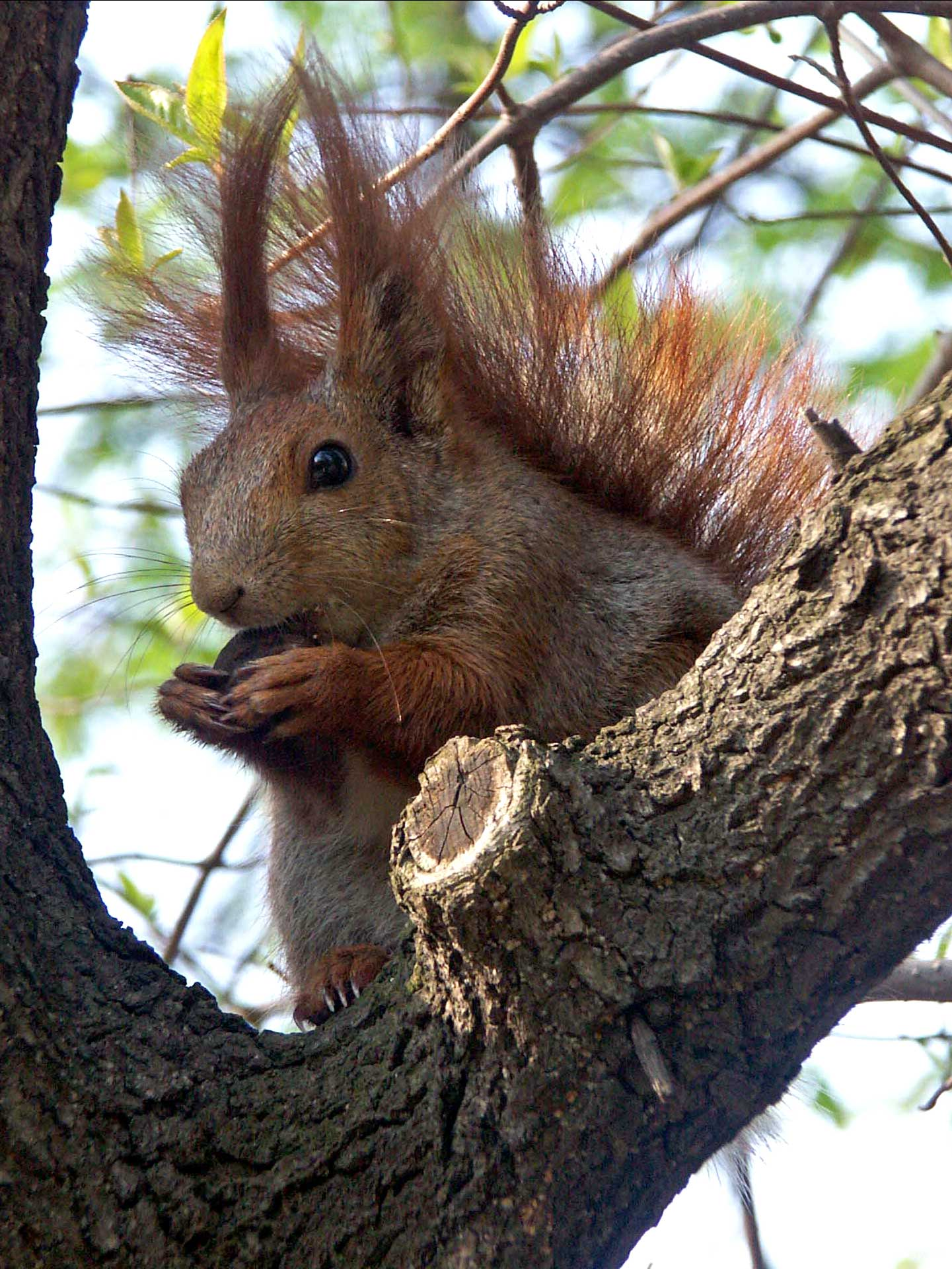
Red squirrel

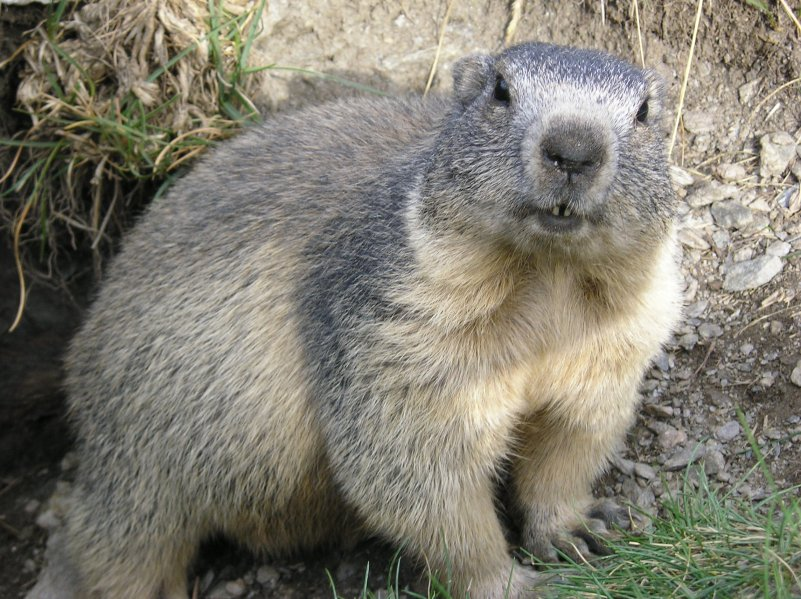
Alpine marmot

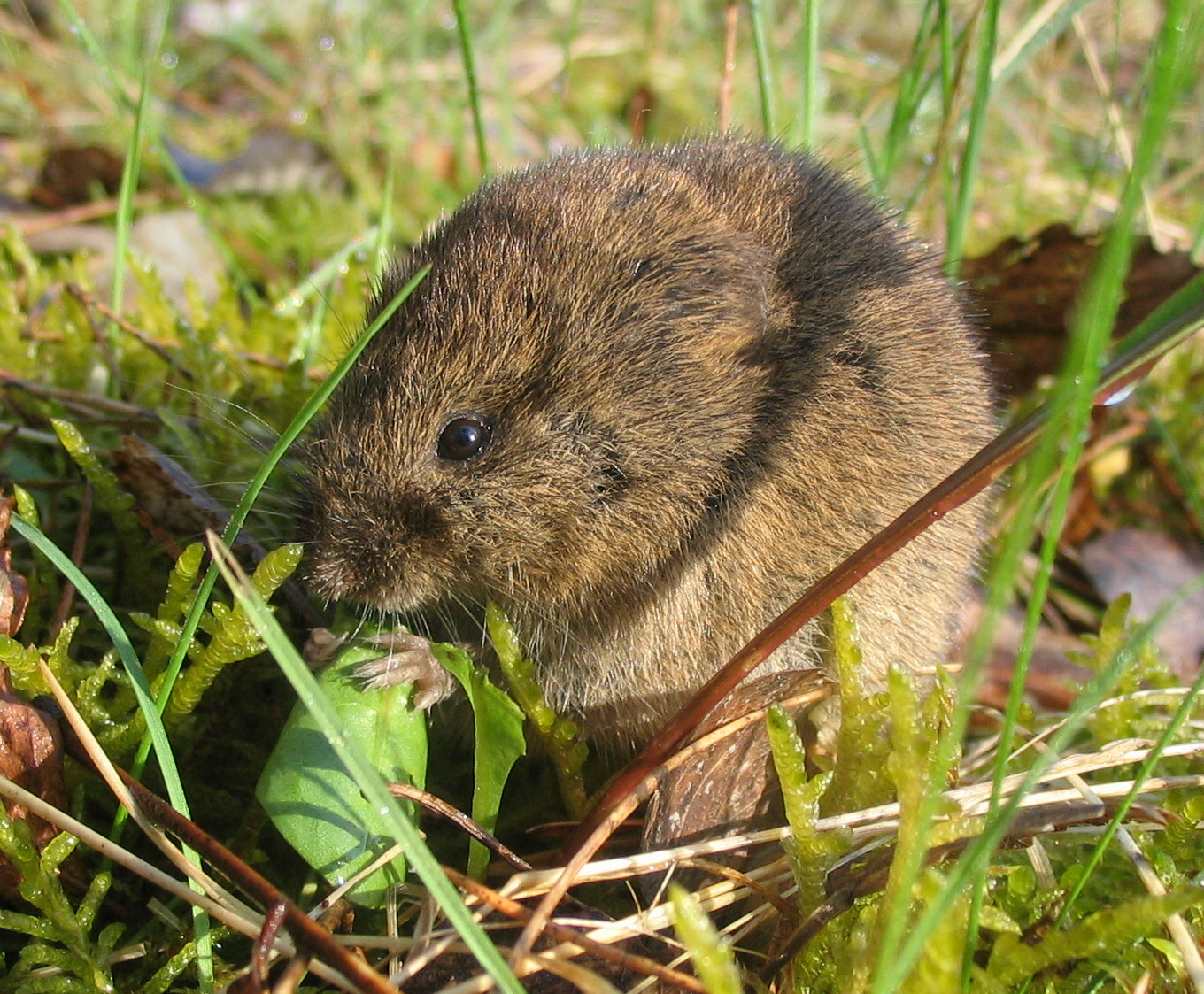
Common vole

Rodents make up the largest order of mammals, with over 40% of mammalian species. They have two incisors in the upper and lower jaw which grow continually and must be kept short by gnawing. Most rodents are small though the capybara can weigh up to 45 kg (99 lb).

- Suborder: Sciurognathi
  - Family: Sciuridae (squirrels)
    - Subfamily: Sciurinae
      - Tribe: Sciurini
        - Genus: Sciurus
          - Red squirrel, S. vulgaris LC
    - Subfamily: Xerinae
      - Tribe: Marmotini
        - Genus: Marmota
          - Alpine marmot, M. marmota LC
        - Genus: Spermophilus
          - European ground squirrel, S. citellus VU
  - Family: Gliridae (dormice)
    - Subfamily: Leithiinae
      - Genus: Dryomys
        - Forest dormouse, D. nitedula LC
      - Genus: Eliomys
        - Garden dormouse, Eliomys quercinus VU
      - Genus: Muscardinus
        - Hazel dormouse, Muscardinus avellanarius LC
    - Subfamily: Glirinae
      - Genus: Glis
        - European edible dormouse, Glis glis LC
  - Family: Spalacidae
    - Subfamily: Spalacinae
      - Genus: Nannospalax
        - Lesser mole rat, Nannospalax leucodon LC
  - Family: Cricetidae
    - Subfamily: Arvicolinae
      - Genus: Arvicola
        - European water vole, Arvicola terrestris LC
      - Genus: Chionomys
        - Snow vole, Chionomys nivalis LC
      - Genus: Clethrionomys
        - Bank vole, Clethrionomys glareolus LC
      - Genus: Dinaromys
        - Balkan snow vole, Dinaromys bogdanovi VU
      - Genus: Microtus
        - Common vole, Microtus arvalis LC
        - Felten's vole, Microtus felteni DD
        - Günther's vole, Microtus guentheri LC
        - European pine vole, Microtus subterraneus LC
        - Thomas's pine vole, Microtus thomasi LC
  - Family: Muridae (mice, rats, voles, gerbils, hamsters, etc.)
    - Subfamily: Murinae
      - Genus: Apodemus
        - Yellow-necked mouse, Apodemus flavicollis LC
        - Wood mouse, Apodemus sylvaticus LC
      - Genus: Micromys
        - Eurasian harvest mouse, Micromys minutus LC
      - Genus: Mus
        - Macedonian mouse, Mus macedonicus LC
        - Steppe mouse, Mus spicilegus

== Order: Lagomorpha (lagomorphs) ==
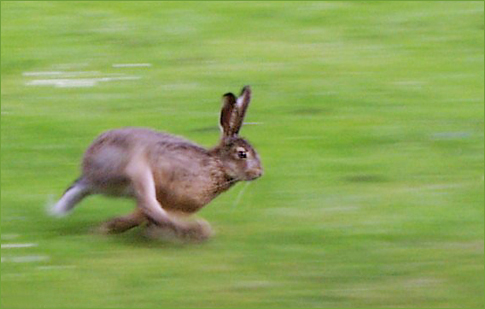
European hare

The lagomorphs comprise two families, Leporidae (hares and rabbits), and Ochotonidae (pikas). Though they can resemble rodents, and were classified as a superfamily in that order until the early 20th century, they have since been considered a separate order. They differ from rodents in a number of physical characteristics, such as having four incisors in the upper jaw rather than two.

- Family: Leporidae (rabbits, hares)
  - Genus: Lepus
    - European hare, L. europaeus LC

== Order: Soricomorpha (shrews, moles, and solenodons) ==
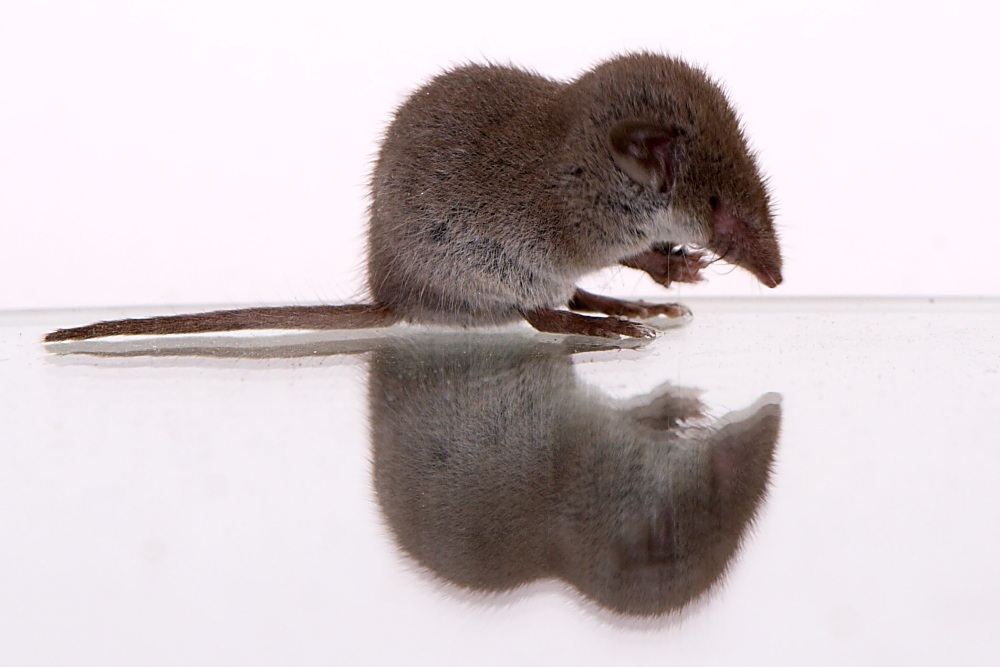
Lesser white-toothed shrew

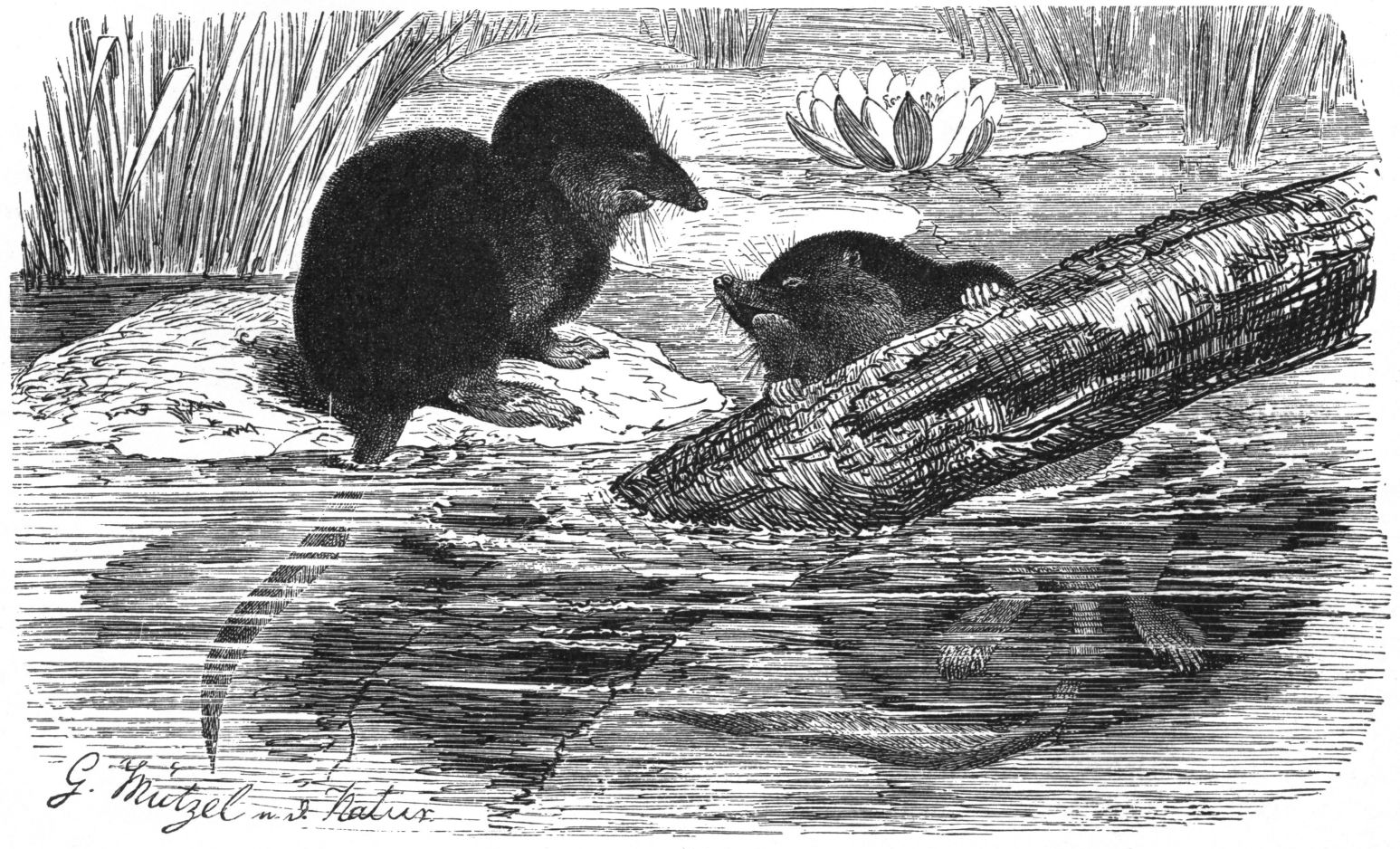
Eurasian water shrews

The "shrew-forms" are insectivorous mammals. The shrews and solenodons closely resemble mice while the moles are stout-bodied burrowers.

- Family: Soricidae (shrews)
  - Subfamily: Crocidurinae
    - Genus: Crocidura
      - Bicolored shrew, C. leucodon LC
      - Lesser white-toothed shrew, C. suaveolens LC
  - Subfamily: Soricinae
    - Tribe: Nectogalini
      - Genus: Neomys
        - Southern water shrew, Neomys anomalus
        - Eurasian water shrew, Neomys fodiens
    - Tribe: Soricini
      - Genus: Sorex
        - Alpine shrew, Sorex alpinus
        - Common shrew, Sorex araneus

== Order: Chiroptera (bats) ==
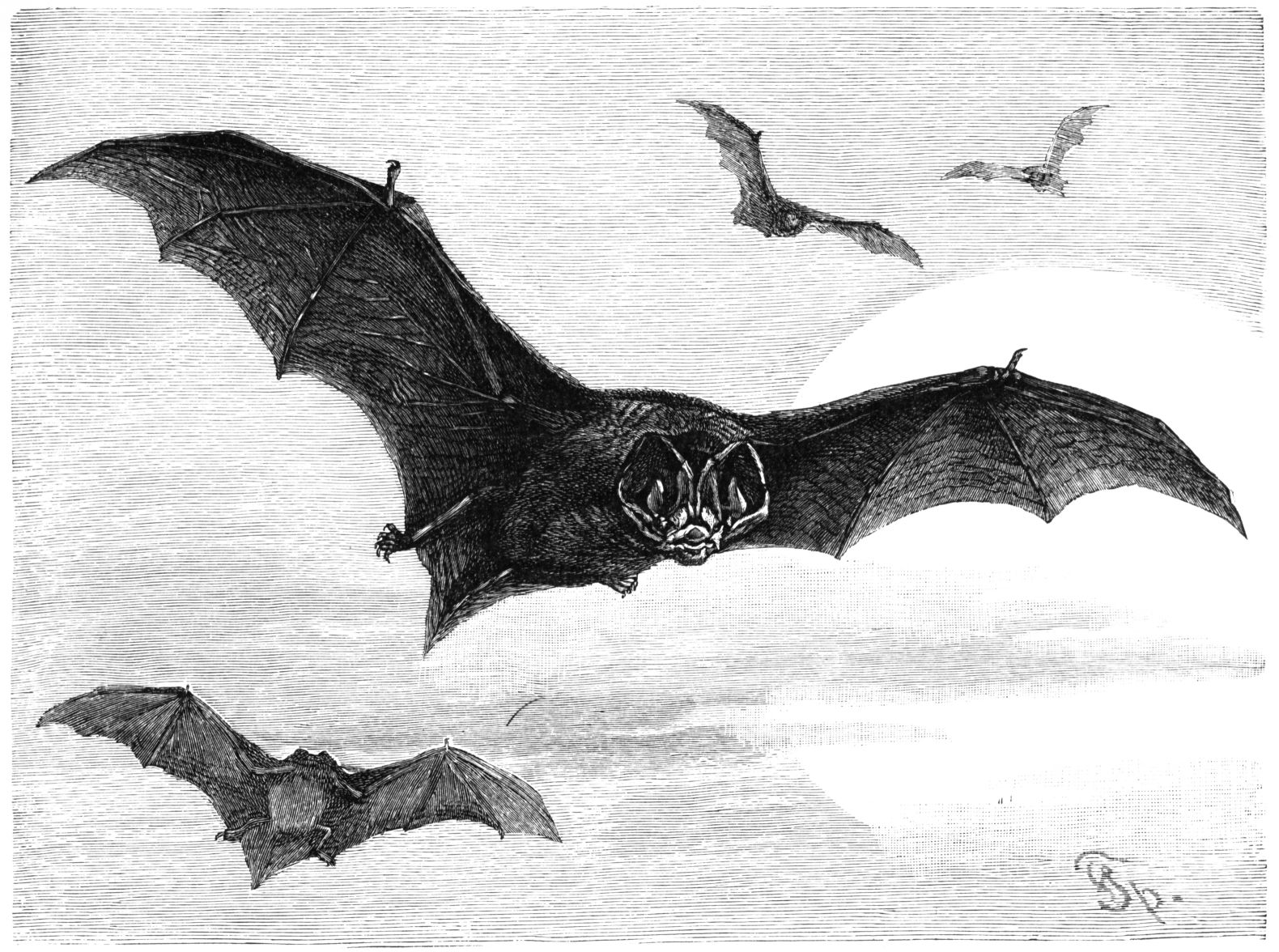
Western barbastelles

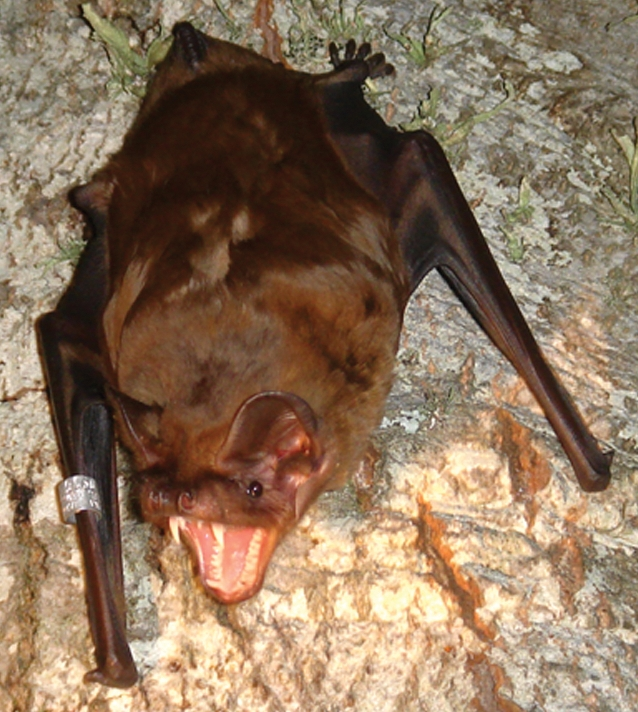
Greater noctule bat

The bats' most distinguishing feature is that their forelimbs are developed as wings, making them the only mammals capable of flight. Bat species account for about 20% of all mammals.

- Family: Vespertilionidae
  - Subfamily: Myotinae
    - Genus: Myotis
      - Bechstein's bat, M. bechsteini NT
      - Long-fingered bat, M. capaccinii VU
      - Geoffroy's bat, M. emarginatus LC
  - Subfamily: Vespertilioninae
    - Genus: Barbastella
      - Western barbastelle, B. barbastellus NT
    - Genus: Nyctalus
      - Greater noctule bat, N. lasiopterus NT
      - Lesser noctule, N. leisleri LC
    - Genus: Pipistrellus
      - Common pipistrelle, Pipistrellus pipistrellus LC
  - Subfamily: Miniopterinae
    - Genus: Miniopterus
      - Common bent-wing bat, M. schreibersii VU
- Family: Rhinolophidae
  - Subfamily: Rhinolophinae
    - Genus: Rhinolophus
      - Mediterranean horseshoe bat, R. euryale NT
      - Greater horseshoe bat, R. ferrumequinum LC
      - Lesser horseshoe bat, R. hipposideros LC
      - Mehely's horseshoe bat, R. mehelyi VU

== Order: Carnivora (carnivorans) ==
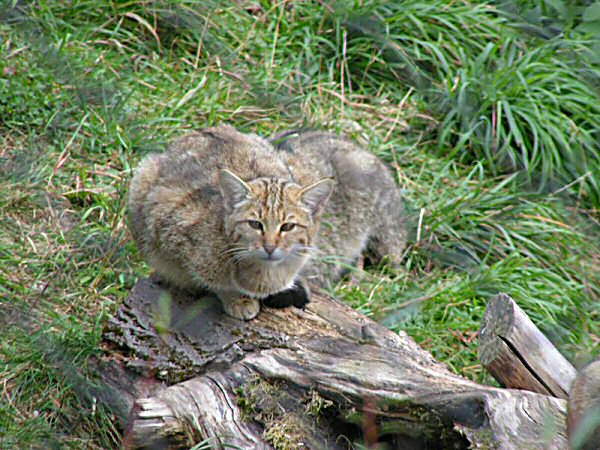
European wildcat

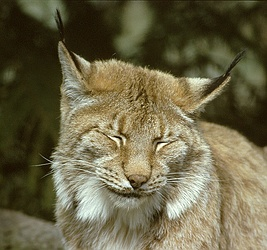
Eurasian lynx

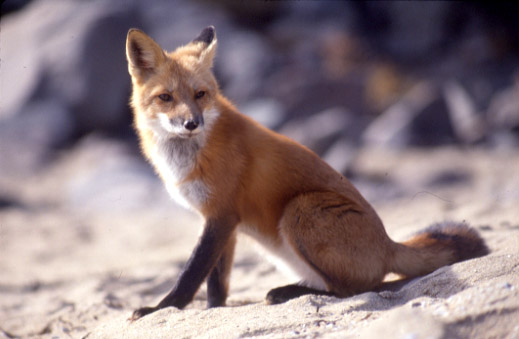
Red fox

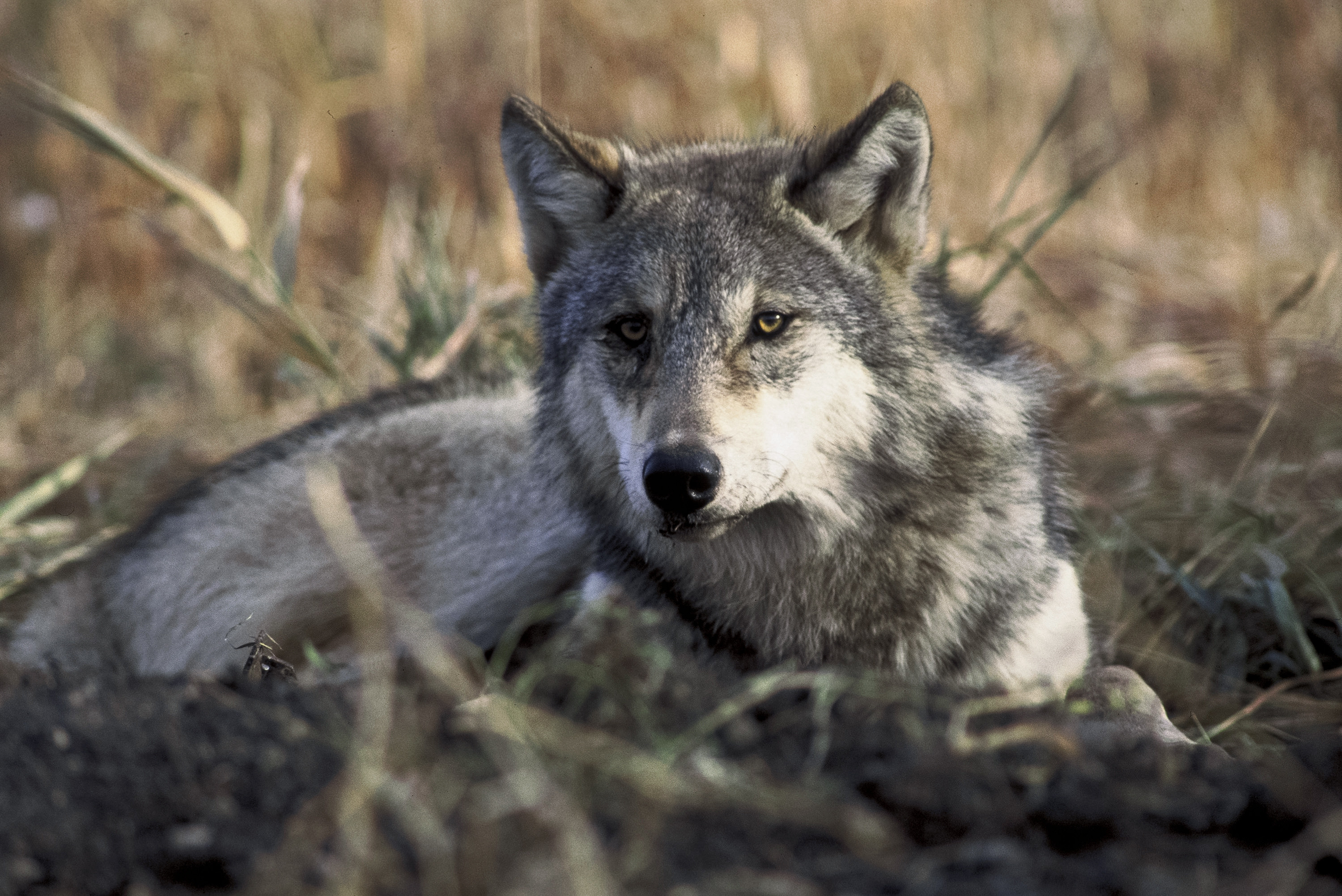
Gray wolf

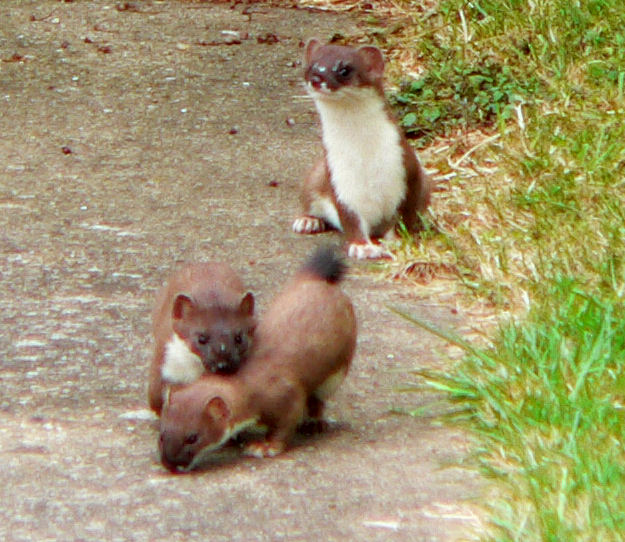
Stoats

There are over 260 species of carnivorans, the majority of which feed primarily on meat. They have a characteristic skull shape and dentition.

- Suborder: Feliformia
  - Family: Felidae (cats)
    - Subfamily: Felinae
      - Genus: Felis
        - European wildcat, F. silvestris LC
      - Genus: Lynx
        - Eurasian lynx, L. lynx LC
- Suborder: Caniformia
  - Family: Canidae (dogs, foxes)
    - Genus: Canis
      - Golden jackal, C. aureus LC
      - Gray wolf, C. lupus LC
        - Eurasian wolf, C. l. lupus
    - Genus: Vulpes
      - Red fox, V. vulpes LC
  - Family: Ursidae (bears)
    - Genus: Ursus
      - Brown bear, U. arctos LC
        - Eurasian brown bear, U. a. arctos
  - Family: Mustelidae (mustelids)
    - Genus: Lutra
      - European otter, L. lutra NT
    - Genus: Martes
      - Beech marten, M. foina LC
    - Genus: Meles
      - European badger, M. meles LC
    - Genus: Mustela
      - Stoat, M. erminea LC
      - Least weasel, M. nivalis LC
      - European polecat, M. putorius LC
    - Genus: Vormela
      - Marbled polecat, V. peregusna VU

== Order: Artiodactyla (even-toed ungulates) ==
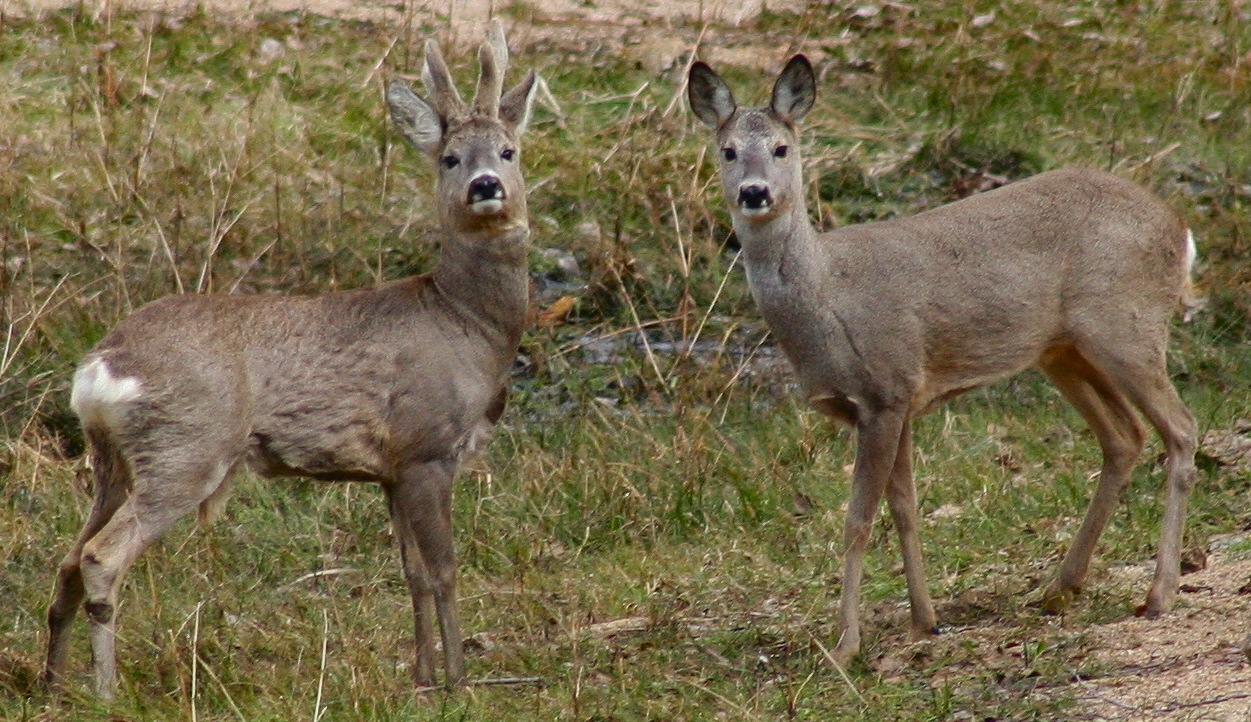
Roe deer

The even-toed ungulates are ungulates whose weight is borne about equally by the third and fourth toes, rather than mostly or entirely by the third as in perissodactyls. There are about 220 artiodactyl species, including many that are of great economic importance to humans.

- Family: Suidae (pigs)
  - Subfamily: Suinae
    - Genus: Sus
      - Wild boar, S. scrofa LC
- Family: Cervidae (deer)
  - Subfamily: Cervinae
    - Genus: Cervus
      - Red deer, C. elaphus LC
    - Genus: Dama
      - European fallow deer, D. dama LC introduced
  - Subfamily: Capreolinae
    - Genus: Capreolus
      - Roe deer, C. capreolus LC
  - Subfamily: Caprinae
    - Genus: Rupicapra
      - Chamois, R. rupicapra LC

== See also ==
- List of chordate orders
- Lists of mammals by region
- List of prehistoric mammals
- Mammal classification
- List of mammals described in the 2000s
