= Military history of North Macedonia =

The military history of North Macedonia spans from the beginning of World War II until the conflict with ethnic Albanian militants, such as the 2001 Macedonia conflict. The country also contributed troops in the war on terror.

== 20th century ==
=== World War II ===
The partisans engaged in organized resistance against the occupation of Yugoslavia since 11 October 1941. Their political and military operation lasted until 23 November 1944 when the Socialist Federal Republic of Yugoslavia was established.

In 1943, the Partisan detachments in Macedonia became formally part of the People's Liberation Army of Macedonia, the first Macedonian military organization. The unit consisted of various battalions, brigades and regiments that adopted the names of former Internal Macedonian Revolutionary Organization (IMRO) revolutionaries, rebel leaders and founders of the partisan detachments.

=== Cold War ===
During the Greek Civil War the National Liberation Front, was created by ethnic Macedonian members of ELAS and DSE.

During the former Yugoslav period, SR Macedonia, like each of the Yugoslav constituent republics had its own Territorial Defense armed forces. During the breakup of Yugoslavia these forces acted as a predecessor to today's military of the Republic of North Macedonia by taking over the control of the military bases and borders from the retreating Yugoslav People's Army.

== 21st century ==
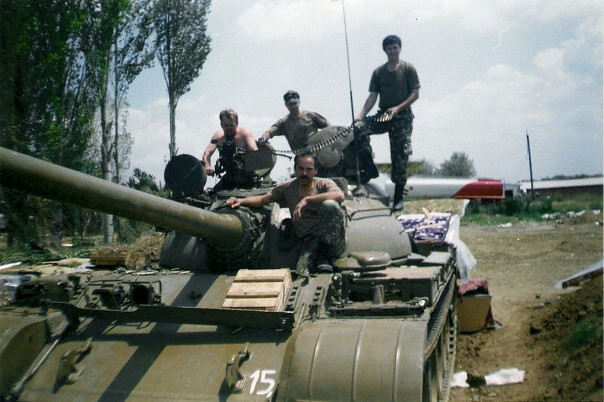
A Macedonian Army reservist tank crew during the 2001 insurgency in the country.

=== 2001 insurgency ===
The 2001 insurgency was a short-lived civil conflict between ethnic Albanian militants of the NLA and special police and military forces of the Republic of Macedonia.

The conflict, which ended with the disarmament of the Albanian militia, resulted in 64 Macedonian military killed in action.

== See also ==
- Military of North Macedonia
- History of North Macedonia
- Invasion of Yugoslavia
- ASNOM
