= Hinduism in North Macedonia =

Hinduism in North Macedonia is mainly represented by the Hare Krishna movement (ISKCON) and the Sathya Sai Baba Organisation. ISKCON and the Satya Sai Baba-Centre have been registered in North Macedonia as a part of the Oriental religion.

== Hare Krishna in North Macedonia ==
ISKCON is a legally registered and recognized as a religious minority in North Macedonia. The main center is located in Skopje, Ul:31 Br:33, nas. Volkovo, 1000 Skopje, with sympathizers throughout the country. Its first center was opened in 1988. Local members are frequently visited by devotees from other former Yugoslav countries, who are considerably larger in number.

In North Macedonia, governments regularly invite Hare Krishna devotees whenever there is an occasion for various religious bodies to meet together. The deceased President Trajkovski invited members each time he met with leaders from other religious groups. m

== Sathya Sai Baba Organisation in North Macedonia ==
The Sathya Sai Baba Organisation is a legally registered and recognized as a religious minority in North Macedonia. The Sathya Sai movement, much like the Hare Krishna devotees, has its roots at the end of the 1980s. At that time a group in Skopje was formed spontaneously. Now the Sathya Sai Organization has three centres in Skopje. There is a smaller group in Štip, and a sizable number of sympathizers in the rest of the country.

== Sources ==
- Media Summary of the Public Meeting in Skopje, held on 23rd of November

== Other Hindu groups ==
- Chinmoy Mission
