= Telecommunications in North Macedonia =

Telecommunications in North Macedonia include radio, television, fixed and mobile telephones, telegraph and the Internet.

== Radio and television ==
- Radio stations: the public radio broadcaster operates over multiple stations; 3 privately owned radio stations broadcast nationally; there are about 70 local commercial radio stations (2012).
- Radios: In the Radios market, volume is expected to amount to 103.00k pieces by 2028.
- Television stations:
  - the public TV broadcaster operates 6 national channels (MRT1, MRT2, MRT3, MRT4, MRT5 and MRT Sobraniski) and a satellite network; 5 privately owned TV channels broadcast nationally using terrestrial transmitters and about 15 broadcast nationally via satellite; there are roughly 75 local commercial TV stations; and a large number of cable operators offering domestic and international programming (2012);
  - 136 stations (1997).
- Television sets: 1.9 million sets in use (2008).

Television is North Macedonia's most popular news medium. Most private media are tied to political or business interests and state media tend to support the government. Public broadcast networks face stiff competition from commercial stations, which dominate the ratings. A European Union sponsored report says that with scores of TV and radio networks, the market is overcrowded and many local broadcasters are struggling to survive financially.

== Telephones ==
- Calling code: +389
- International call prefix: 00
- Main lines:
  - 407,900 lines in use, 103rd in the world (2012);
  - 550,000 lines in use (2005).
- Mobile cellular:
  - 2.2 million lines, 142nd in the world;
  - 2.1 million lines (2008).

The combined fixed-line and mobile-cellular telephone subscribership was about 130 per 100 persons in 2012. Competition from mobile-cellular phones has led to a drop in fixed-line telephone subscriptions.

== Internet ==
- Top-level domains: .mk and .мкд (Cyrillic).
- Internet users:
  - 1.3 million users, 109th in the world; 63.1% of the population, 58th in the world (2012);
  - 1.1 million users, 97th in the world, 52% of the population (2009).
- Fixed broadband: 304,547 subscriptions, 79th in the world; 14.6% of the population, 58th in the world (2012).
- Wireless broadband: 449,646 subscriptions, 93rd in the world; 21.6% of the population, 68th in the world (2012).
- Internet hosts: 62,826 hosts, 92nd in the world (2012).
- IPv4: 657,664 addresses allocated, less than 0.05% of the world total, 315.8 addresses per 1000 people (2012).
- Internet service providers: 20 ISPs (2005).
- Wi-Fi coverage: 95% of the population (2006).

The United States Agency for International Development sponsored a project called "Macedonia Connects" which in 2006 helped to make Macedonia the first all-broadband wireless country in the world, where Internet access is available to virtually anyone with a wireless-enabled computer. Wireless access is available to about 95% of the population, even those living in remote sheepherding mountain villages where people don't have phones. The Ministry of Education and Sciences reported that all 461 primary and secondary schools were connected to the Internet. An Internet Service Provider (On.net), created a MESH Network to provide WIFI services in the 11 largest cities/towns in the country.

=== Internet censorship and surveillance ===
There are no government restrictions on access to the Internet or credible reports that the government monitors e-mail or Internet chat rooms without judicial oversight. Individuals and groups engage in the peaceful expression of views via the Internet, including by e-mail.

The constitution provides for freedom of speech and press; however, the government does not always respect these rights in practice. The law prohibits speech that incites national, religious, or ethnic hatred, and provides penalties for violations. In November 2012 the defamation, libel and slander laws were decriminalized. Editors and media owners expressed concerns that steep fines under the revised law would cause self-censorship. The law prohibits arbitrary interference with privacy, family, home, or correspondence, and the government generally respects these prohibitions in practice.

== See also ==
- Media in North Macedonia
- Macedonian Radio Television, the public broadcaster of North Macedonia
- Makedonski Telekom
- MRT Sat or MKTV Sat, Macedonian Radio Television's satellite service
