= Coptic Australians =

Total population
- 24,693 (by ancestry, 2011), or up to 70,000-100,000 (estimated)

Languages
- Australian English · Egyptian Arabic · Coptic (Liturgical)

Religion
- Coptic Orthodoxy · Coptic Catholicism

Related ethnic groups
- Egyptian Australians

Coptic Australians (Arabic: أستراليون أقباط) are Australians of Coptic descent or persons of Coptic descent residing in Australia. According to the 2011 census, there were 24,693 Copts in Australia, mostly members of the Coptic Orthodox Church. The Coptic population within Australia is estimated to be between 70,000 and 100,000 people.

== Immigration history ==
Congregations of the Coptic Orthodox Church in Australia are served by two Coptic Orthodox Dioceses with over 50 parishes, two Monasteries, two theological Colleges and four schools. The Coptic Church is a member of National Council of Churches in Australia. According to the 2006 Census of Australia, there were a total of 19,928 followers of Coptic Orthodoxy nationally. Currently, the Coptic Orthodox Church has as many 100,000 members in Australia (in Sydney alone it is estimated that there are 70,000 Copts, with numbers in Melbourne in the tens of thousands). The community is growing.

Around three quarters of Egyptian migrants arrived in Australia before 1976, though many arrived between 1986 and 1991. In the early years of migration to Australia, most Egyptian-born migrants were of Greek or Armenian (36 percent) as well as Italian or Maltese heritage (45 percent). Egyptian Jews, Copts and Protestants each made up around 5 percent of arrivals. However, the number of Copts migrating to Australia increased during the 1960s. Many Christian Egyptians left Egypt in response to the pan-Arabist and Islamist policies of president Gamal Abdel Nasser's leadership. Nowadays, the majority of Egyptian Australians are Christians (84 percent), mostly Copts. On average, Egyptian Australians generally attain higher levels of education when compared to other Australians.

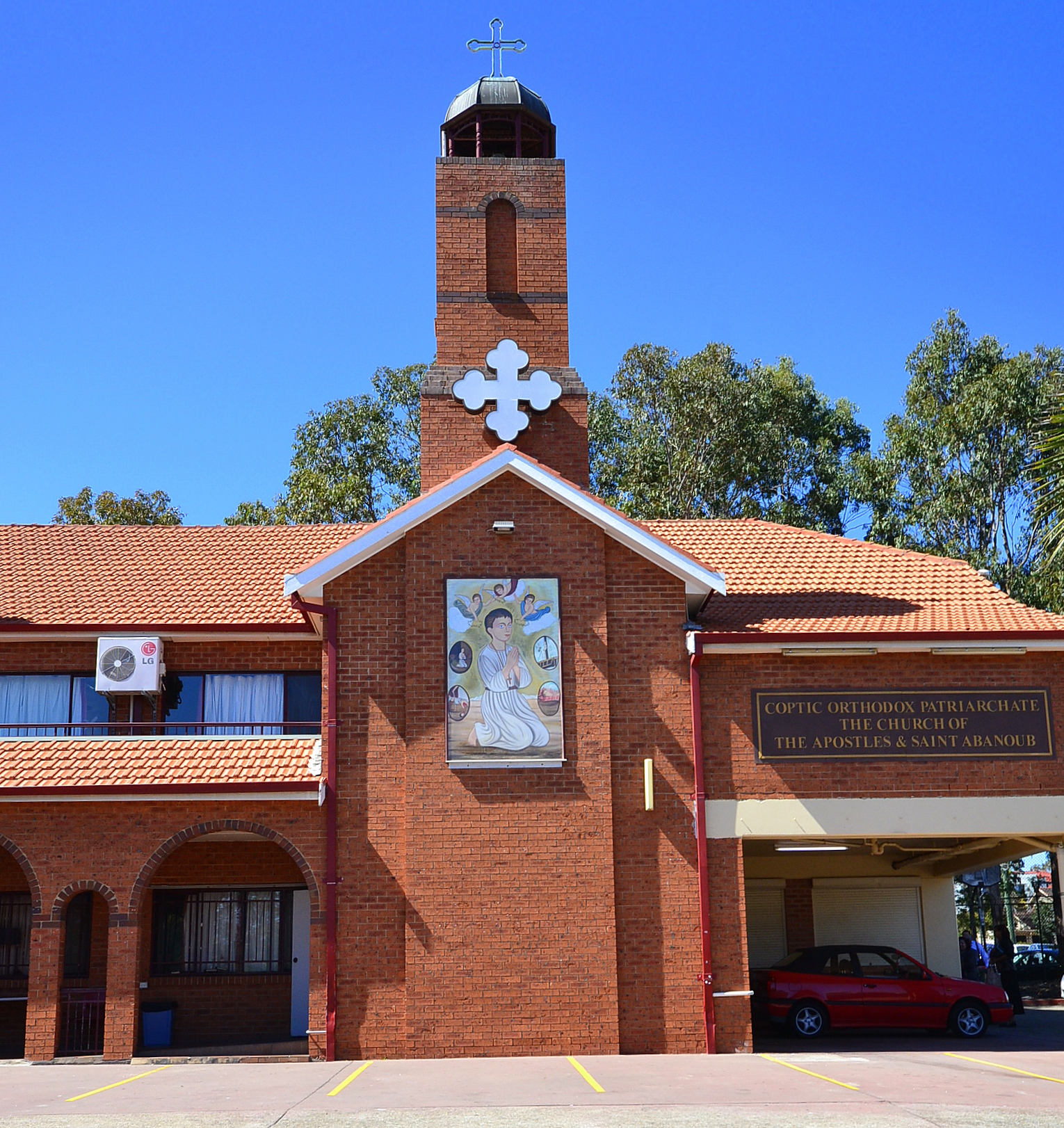
St Abanoub and The Holy Apostles Coptic Orthodox Church in Blacktown, Sydney

The first Coptic families in Sydney met at the Church of England parish in Artarmon on Sydney's lower North Shore. These early migrants were dependant on other Orthodox churches in the area for the use of churches and halls for services, festivals and activities. In 1967, a letter was sent from Sydney's Coptic community to the Coptic Pope, Pope Kyrillos VI requesting that a church would be established and a priest would be sent to serve the community. On 10 March 1968, Deacon Edward was ordained in Alexandria and given the name Father Mina. He was sent to Sydney in 1969. He performed his first Coptic wedding on Australia Day in 1969 in a Salvation Army Hall in Redfern, in Sydney's inner south. He regularly travelled to Melbourne to conduct services, weddings and bible study for the local Coptic community. Soon, the funds were raised to establish a Coptic church - St Mary and St Mina's - which was formerly a Methodist church in Sydenham. This church was badly affected by aircraft noise and has since relocated to Bexley.

Melbourne's first Copts arrived in the late 1960s, and first consisted of around 40 families. The new community worshipped at the Church of All Nations in Carlton. Already established Copts would wait at Station Pier Wharf, greeting new arrivals from Egypt and supporting them through accommodation and employment. The growing congregation rented a hall attached to the Syrian Maronite Church in Victoria Parade, East Melbourne. The first Coptic church in Melbourne was established in Kensington, in the inner-west, and dedicated to the Virgin Mary in 1970. The church has since had a school attached. There is now a Coptic Village Hostel for the elderly in Hallam, in Melbourne's outer eastern suburbs - nearby the Coptic Orthodox Church of St Mina and St Marina. The Coptic community of Perth began in the 1980s with about 25 families. In 1990, Perth's Coptic community purchased its first church, St Mary and Archangel Michael Church in East Victoria Park. Adelaide's Copts were served by visiting priests until the permanent establishment of St Mary and Anba Bishoy Church.

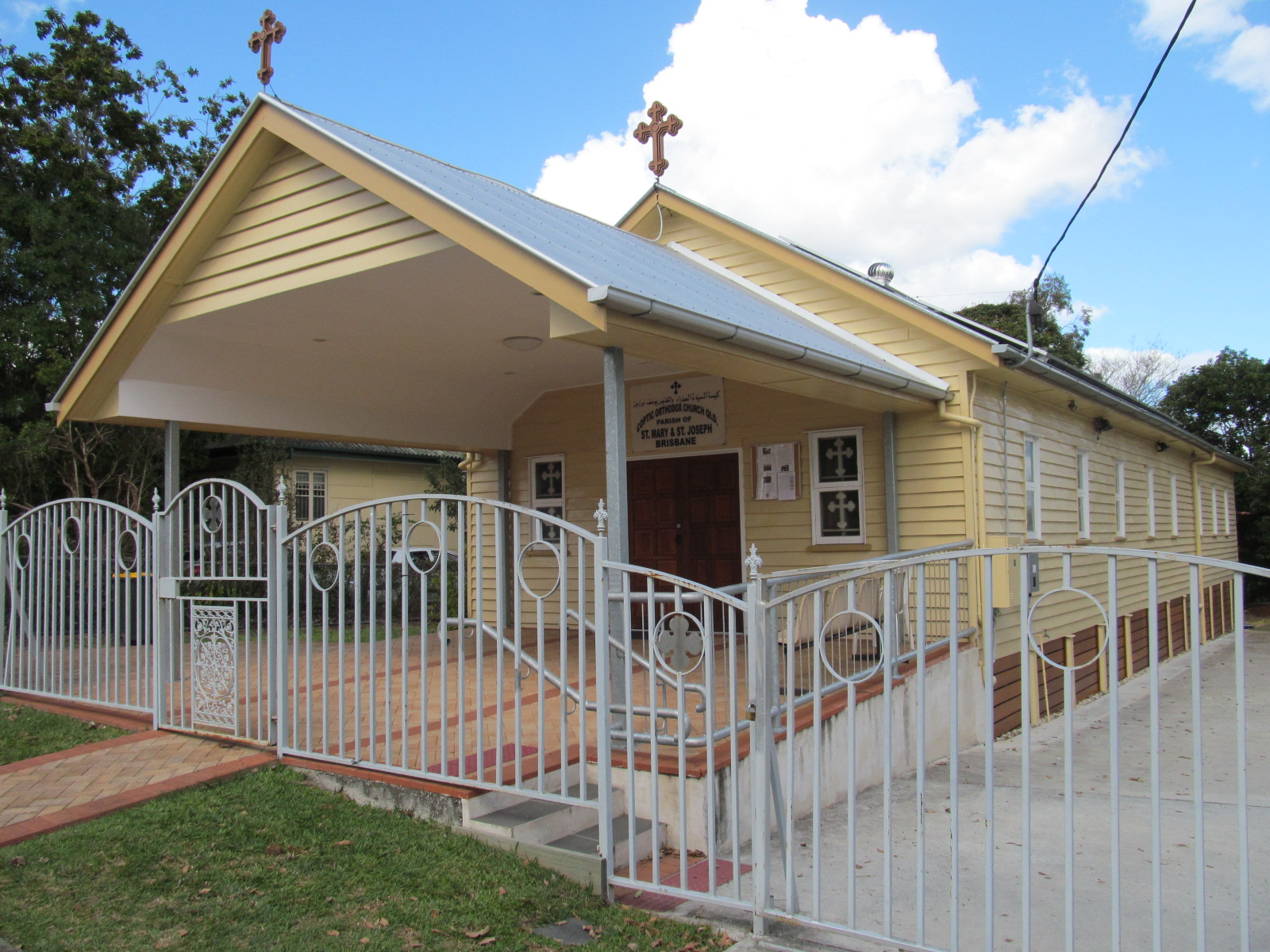
St Mary and St Joseph Coptic Orthodox Church in Coopers Plains, Queensland

In 1982, the first Coptic Orthodox theological college outside of Egypt was established in Sydney as the Pope Shenouda III College for Theological Studies. In 1999, Bishop Suriel moved the diocesan headquarters to Donvale, in Melbourne's northeast, where the complex boasts a library. hostel and sporting facilities. The nearby St Athanasius Coptic Orthodox Church was established in 2001 and renovated in 2007. There are now 16 Coptic churches in Victoria, one in the Australian Capital Territory, two in South Australia, two in Western Australia, two in Tasmania, 33 in New South Wales, 10 in Queensland and one in the Northern Territory. There are also three monasteries, two theological colleges and four schools. St Mary Coptic Orthodox College was opened in 1991 by Pope Shenouda III in Clifton Hill. In 1994, it relocated to its present site in Coolaroo - in Melbourne's north west.

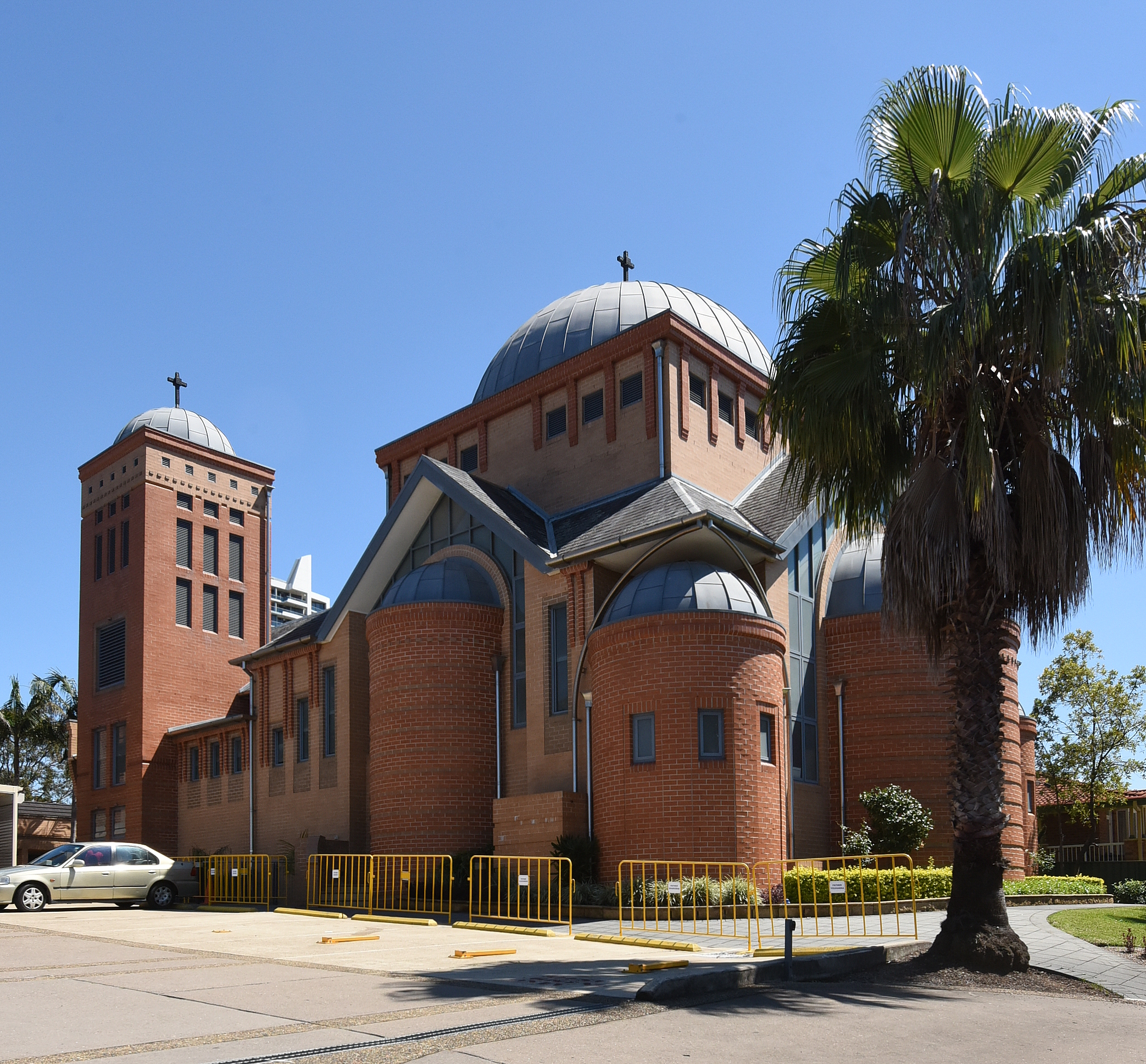
St Mary and St Merkorious Coptic Orthodox Church in Rhodes, Sydney

In New South Wales, around half of the Coptic Orthodox population was born in Australia, while 37 percent were born in Australia and almost 10 percent were born in Sudan. Also in New South Wales, the majority of Copts identify as having Egyptian heritage with minorities identifying as Australian, Sudanese or Lebanese. Three quarters of Copts in New South Wales speak Arabic at home while about 10 percent have a low proficiency in English. A higher proportion of New South Wales Coptic Orthodox population work white-collar jobs such as managers or professionals. Furthermore, Coptic Orthodox household sizes were significantly higher than other New South Wales residents. Copts in Sydney are concentrated in the city councils of Blacktown, Canterbury Bankstown, Liverpool, Bayside and Georges River while Copts in Melbourne largely reside in the north western suburbs, particularly in the city councils of Hume and Whittlesea.

There is also a small and recent community of Coptic Catholics in Australia. In 2019, the Patriarch of the Coptic Catholic Church, Ibrahim Isaak Sidrak, travelled from Egypt to consecrate the newly built St Mark's Coptic Catholic Church in Prospect (in Sydney's outer west). Western Sydney's Coptic Catholic community consists of about 200 families.

== Notable Coptic Australians ==
- Nick Kaldas
- Sam Soliman
- Anba Suriel
- Joseph Tawadros
- Peter Khalil

== See also ==
- Coptic Orthodox Church in Australia
- List of Coptic Orthodox churches in Australia
- Copts
- Coptic diaspora
- Coptic Americans
- Coptic Canadians
- Copts in Egypt
- Copts in Sudan
- Copts in Libya
