= Egyptian Australians =

Australians of Egyptian descent

Total population
- 100,000+ (Membership, 2017); 36,532 (by country of birth, 2011)

Regions with significant populations
- Sydney, Melbourne, Perth, Canberra, Adelaide, Newcastle, Brisbane

Languages
- Australian English, Egyptian Arabic, Coptic, Nobiin, Sa'idi Arabic

Religion
- Christianity (majority); Islam, Baháʼí, Judaism (minority)

Related ethnic groups
- Egyptians, Copts, Coptic Australians Egyptian diaspora, Arab Australians, Egyptian Americans, Egyptian Canadians

People born in Egypt as a percentage of the population in Sydney divided geographically by postal area, as of the 2011 census.

Egyptian Australians (Arabic: مصريون أستراليون) are Australian citizens and Australian permanent residents of Egyptian descent. According to the Australian 2011 Census, 36,532 Australian citizens and permanent residents declared that they were born in Egypt, while based on the 2006 Census, at least an additional 31,786 declared that they were of full or partial Egyptian ancestry and born in a country other than Egypt (including most numerously Australian-born persons of full or partial Egyptian ancestry). The 2021 Census shows that the majority of Egypt-born Australians are located in Sydney (19,680) and Melbourne (13,312).

The majority of Egyptian Australians are Christians, which is in contrast to the religious affiliation to Islam of the majority of the population of ethnic Egyptians within modern Egypt. Some 19,928 Australian citizens and residents declared membership of the Coptic Orthodox Church at the 2006 Census. Most Egyptian Christians, however, may simply have declared themselves "Christian" without specifying the Coptic denomination, while other Egyptian Christians may belong to various other denominations, either born into or converted. In 2003, however, it was claimed in the New South Wales Parliament that there were in fact 70,000 Copts in New South Wales alone. An additional 1,890 persons in the 2006 Census reported themselves as being of "Coptic" ancestry. The term Coptic ordinarily refers to adherents of Coptic Christianity, but when used as a term referring to ethnicity means "Egyptian" (almost always in the context of Coptic Christian Egyptians). The 1,890 persons who described their ancestry as "Coptic" are thus most likely Egyptian Australians. Copt as an ethnonym is etymologically derived from the Greek "Aiguptious," literally meaning "Egyptian," from the Late Egyptian word "Gyptios", via the Classical Arabic "Qubt", into the English "Copt". The word ordinarily refers to Coptic Christian Egyptians, though there have been instances of Muslim Egyptians referring to themselves as "Copts" to emphasise the non-Arabian ancestral origin of Egyptians in general.

== History ==
First history of short term Egyptian migrants in Australia dates back to 1860s to 1900 period when small groups of mainly Muslim cameleers were shipped in and out of Australia at three-year intervals, to service South Australia's inland pastoral industry by carting goods and transporting wool bales by camel trains, who were commonly referred to as "Afghans" or "Ghans", despite their origin often being mainly from British India, and some even from Afghanistan and Egypt and Turkey.

Permanent emigration from Egypt began in the late 1940s and 1950s, disproportionately so for non-ethnic Egyptian minorities escaping the growing Arab nationalist movement in Egypt which saw the overthrow of the Egyptian monarchy and the subsequent Suez Crisis.

In total numbers, Egyptian Christians were the largest contingent of emigrants to leave Egypt for other countries, including to Australia. Christians were the second largest in terms of proportion to their original community size in Egypt. Egyptian Jews, as a proportion of their original community size in Egypt, were the largest emigrant community to leave Egypt (they were the second largest in total numbers). The number of Jews in Egypt numbered around 75,000 in 1948; following the establishment of the State of Israel that same year, most of the population left, starting the Jewish exodus from Arab lands, and settling largely in Israel, USA, Europe, Latin America, with around 2,000 settling in Australia. The Egyptian Jewish population in Australia is concentrated particularly in Adelaide, South Australia. Officially, only 6 Jews remain in Egypt today.

=== Demographics ===
Egyptian Australian demography by religion (note that it includes only Egyptian born in Egypt and not australian with egyptian background)
Religious group	2021 (Note: Religious breakdown proportions based on "Egyptian" ethnic or cultural origin response on the 2021 census.)		2016 (Note: Religious breakdown proportions based on "Egyptian" ethnic or cultural origin response on the 2016 census.)		2011 (Note: Religious breakdown proportions based on "Egyptian" ethnic or cultural origin response on the 2011 census.)	
Religious group	Pop.	%	Pop.	%	Pop.	%
Coptic Orthodox	16,259 ▲	37.63% ▼	15,213 ▲	38.25% ▲	13,214	36.17%
Catholic	6,197 ▼	14.34% ▼	7,131 ▼	17.93% ▼	7,985	21.86%
Eastern Orthodox	3,833 ▼	8.87% ▼	4,276 ▼	10.75% ▼	5,393	14.76%
Protestant and Other Christian	3,872 ▲	8.96% ▼	3,816 ▲	9.59% ▲	2,853	7.81%
(Total Christian)	30,161▼	69.8% ▼	30,434▲	76.51%▼	29,443	80.6%
Islam	9,711 ▲	22.47% ▲	6,191 ▲	15.56% ▲	4,716	12.91%
Irreligion	1,912 ▲	4.42% ▲	1,472 ▲	3.7% ▲	985	2.7%
Buddhism	35 ▲	0.08%	33 ▼	0.08% ▼	39	0.11%
Hinduism	25 ▲	0.06% ▲	21 ▲	0.05%	19	0.05%
Judaism	337 ▼	0.78% ▼	389 ▼	0.98% ▼	456	1.25%
Other	40 ▲	0.09%	33 ▲	0.08%	28	0.08%
Not stated	939 ▼	2.17% ▼	1,143 ▲	2.87% ▲	752	2.06%
Total Egyptian Australian population	43,213 ▲	100%	39,776 ▲	100%	36,532	100%

Egyptian Australian demography by religion (Ancestry included)
Religious group	2021		2016		2011	
Religious group	Pop.	%	Pop.	%	Pop.	%
Coptic Orthodox	41,465 ▲	40.11% ▼	37,571 ▲	41.61% ▲	30,747	40.64%
Catholic	13,525 ▼	13.08% ▼	14,150 ▼	15.67% ▼	14,412	19.05%
Eastern Orthodox	6,016 ▼	5.82% ▼	6,167 ▼	6.83% ▼	7,340	9.7%
Protestant and Other Christian	9,197 ▲	8.9% ▼	8,622 ▲	9.55% ▲	6,216	8.22%
(Total Christian)	70,205▲	67.91% ▼	66,510▲	73.66%▼	58,715	77.61%
Islam	22,931 ▲	22.18% ▲	15,336 ▲	16.98% ▲	11,476	15.17%
Irreligion	7,300 ▲	7.06% ▲	4,799 ▲	5.31% ▲	2,862	3.78%
Buddhism	78 ▲	0.08%	72 ▼	0.08% ▼	103	0.14%
Hinduism	37 ▲	0.04% ▲	30 ▲	0.03%	22	0.03%
Judaism	768 ▼	0.74% ▼	739 ▼	0.82% ▼	856	1.13%
Other	222 ▲	0.21% ▲	89 ▲	0.1% ▼	80	0.11%
Not stated	1,767 ▼	1.71% ▼	2,551 ▲	2.83% ▲	1,496	1.98%
Total Egyptian Australian population	103,377 ▲	100%	90,296 ▲	100%	75,651	100%

== Notable people ==
- Aziza Abdel-Halim
- Anne Aly
- Waleed Aly
- Bishop Angaelos
- Albert Bensimon
- Jonah Bolden
- Taj El-Din Hilaly
- Robert Kabbas
- Nick Kaldas
- Naguib Kanawati
- Peter Khalil
- Henry Ninio
- Ahmed Saad
- Theodore Saidden
- Akmal Saleh
- Sam Soliman
- Joseph Tawadros

== See also ==
- Australia–Egypt relations
- Egyptian diaspora in Australia related topics
  - Arab Australians
  - Coptic Orthodoxy in Australia
  - Persecution of Copts in Egypt
  - Persecution of Jews in Egypt
- Egyptian diaspora elsewhere
  - Egyptian Americans
  - Egyptian Canadians
  - Egyptians in the United Kingdom
