= Turkish Australians =

Australian people of Turkish descent

Turkish Australians Avustralya'daki Türkler
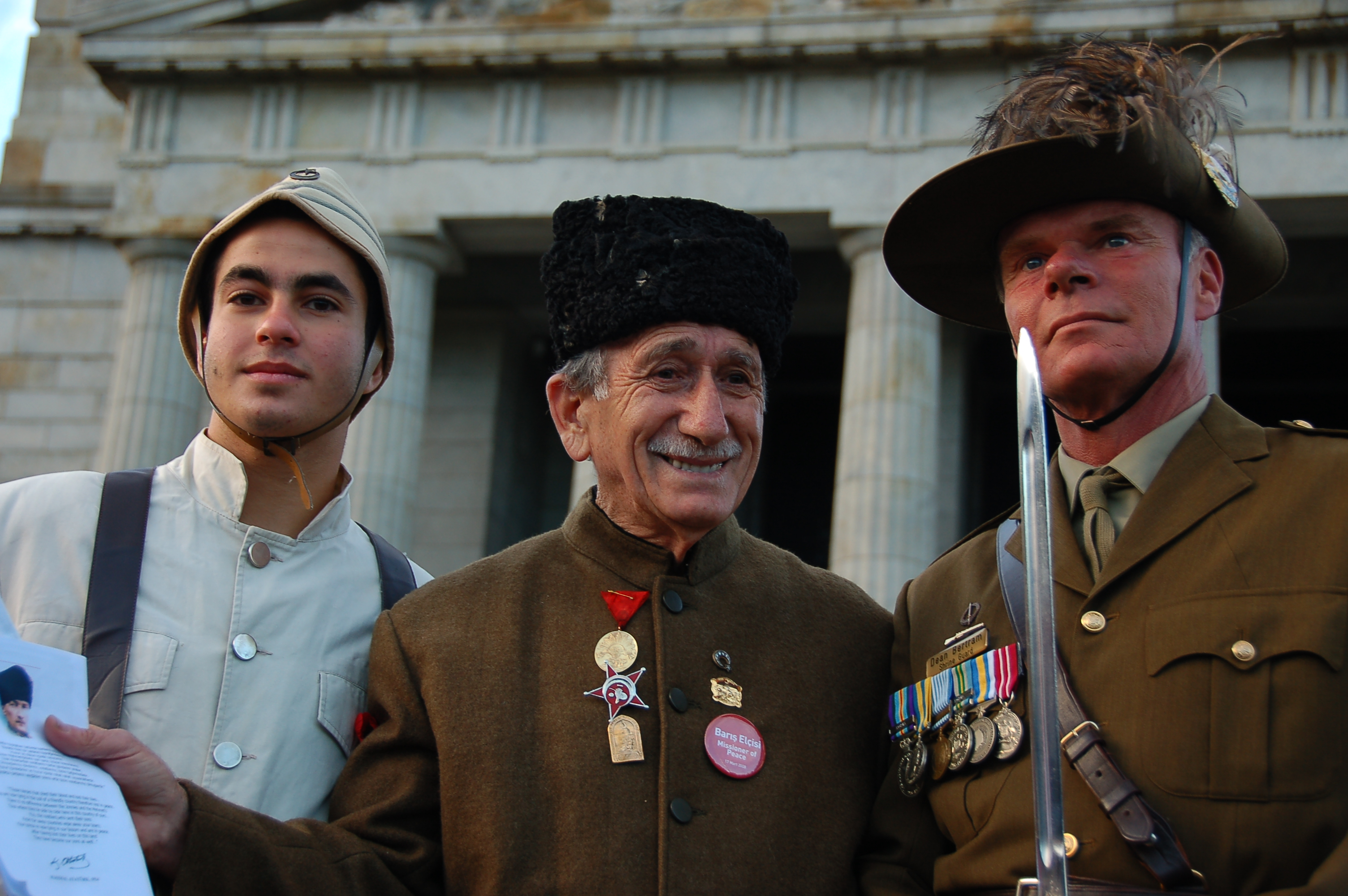
- Son of Turkish Gallipoli veteran at the Shrine of Remembrance in Melbourne

Total population
- 87,164 (by ancestry, 2021) (0.3% of the Australian population); 38,568 (by birth, 2021)

Regions with significant populations
- Melbourne, Sydney, Wollongong, Shepparton, Bundaberg

Languages
- Turkish (including the Cypriot Turkish dialect) and Australian English

Religion
- Predominantly Sunni Islam; Minority Alevism, Christianity, other religions, and irreligious

Turkish Australians (Turkish: Türk Avustralyalılar) or Australian Turks (Turkish: Avustralyalı Türkler) are Australians who have emigrated from Turkey or who have Turkish ancestral origins.

Turks first began to immigrate to Australia from Cyprus for work in the 1940s, and then again when Turkish Cypriots were forced to leave their homes during the Cyprus conflict between 1963 and 1974. Furthermore, many Turkish immigrants arrived in Australia after a bilateral agreement was signed between Turkey and Australia in 1967. Recently, smaller groups of Turks have begun to immigrate to Australia from Bulgaria, Greece, Iraq and North Macedonia. There were also many Australians in Turkey during World War I (Gallipoli/ANZAC).

== History ==
=== Ottoman migration ===
Earliest known short term Turkish migrants in Australia date back to 1860s to 1900 period when small groups of mainly Muslim cameleers were shipped in and out of Australia at three-year intervals, to service South Australia's inland pastoral industry by carting goods and transporting wool bales by camel trains, who were commonly referred to as "Afghans" or "Ghans", despite their origin often being mainly from British India, and some even from Afghanistan and Egypt and Turkey.

The presence of Turkish people in Australia dates back to the early 19th century, although at the time there were only about 20 Turkish settlers. Their number increased to 300 by the 1911 census. Their number declined during the First World War when Australia and Turkey fought on opposite sides.

=== Turkish Cypriot migration ===
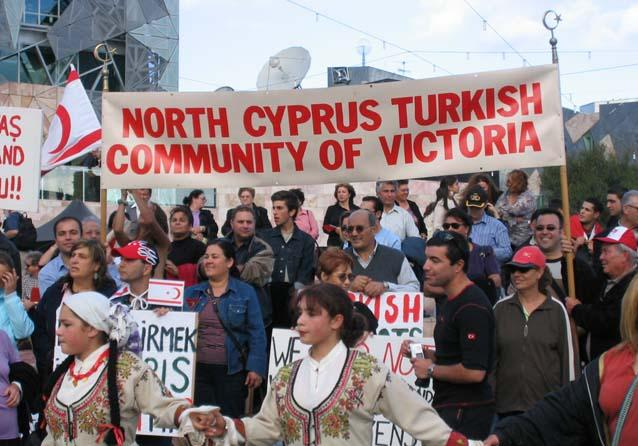
Turkish Cypriot community in Victoria

A notable scale of Turkish Cypriot migration to Australia began in the late 1940s; they were the only Muslims acceptable under the White Australia Policy. Prior to 1940, the Australian Census recorded only three settlers from Cyprus that spoke Turkish as their primary language. A further 66 Turkish Cypriots arrived in Australia in the late 1940s, marking the beginning of a Turkish Cypriot immigration trend to Australia. By 1947-1956 there were 350 Turkish Cypriot settlers who were living in Australia.

Between 1955 and 1960, the island of Cyprus' independence was approaching; however, Turkish Cypriots felt vulnerable as they had cause for concern about the political future of the island when the Greek Cypriots attempted to overthrow the British government and unite Cyprus with Greece (known as "enosis"). After a failed attempt by the Greek Cypriots, the right-wing party, EOKA, reformed itself from 1963 to 1974 and launched a series of attacks in a bid to proclaim "enosis". These atrocities resulted in the exodus of Turkish Cypriots in fear for their lives, many migrating to Australia and Britain. Early Turkish Cypriot immigrants found jobs working in factories, out in the fields, or building national infrastructure. However, some Turkish Cypriots became entrepreneurs and established their own businesses once they had saved enough money.

Once the Greek military junta rose to power in 1967, they staged a coup d'état in 1974 against the Cypriot President, with the help of EOKA B, to unite the island of Cyprus with Greece. Thus, there was an exodus of more Turkish Cypriots to Australia due to fears that the island would unite with Greece. The Greek coup led to an illegal military invasion by Turkey which divided the island and had an illegal occupation of the island until now. In 1983 the Turkish Cypriots declared their own state, the Turkish Republic of Northern Cyprus (TRNC), which has remained internationally unrecognised except by Turkey. The division has led to an economic embargo against the Turkish Cypriots by the United States and Greek Cypriot controlled Government of Cyprus, effectively depriving the Turkish Cypriots of foreign investment, aid and export markets. Thus, the Turkish Cypriot economy has remained stagnant and undeveloped; Turkish Cypriots have continued to leave the island in search of a better life in Britain, Australia, and Canada.

=== Mainland Turkish migration ===
On 5 October 1967, the governments of Australia and Turkey signed an agreement to allow Turkish citizens to immigrate to Australia. Prior to this recruitment agreement, there were less than 3,000 people of Turkish origin in Australia. According to the Australian Bureau of Statistics, nearly 19,000 Turkish immigrants arrived from 1968 to 1974. The first Turkish immigrants were greeted at Sydney Airport by Turkish Cypriots, whilst Turkish immigrants who moved to Melbourne were greeted at Essendon Airport by members of the Cyprus Turkish Association. They came largely from rural areas of Turkey; at the time, approximately 30% were skilled and 70% were unskilled workers. However, this changed in the 1980s when the number of skilled Turks applying to enter Australia had increased considerably. Over the next 35 years the Turkish population rose to almost 100,000. More than half of the Turkish community settled in Victoria, mostly in the north-western suburbs of Melbourne.

=== Migration from other countries ===
There are also ethnic Turks who have immigrated to Australia from Bulgaria, the Western Thrace area of northern Greece, North Macedonia, as well as Germany and other Western European countries.

== Demographics ==
People with Turkish ancestry as a percentage of the population in Sydney divided geographically by postal area, as of the 2011 census

=== Population ===
According to the 2021 Australian census, 38,582 Australian residents were born in Turkey. In addition, 87,164 people born in Australia claimed Turkish ancestry, making up 0.3% of the country's population.

Number of ethnic Turks in Australia according to the 2021 Australian Census
Country of birth	ethnic Turks	Turkish spoken at home
Turkey	38,568	30,250
Northern Cyprus	4,332	2,893
Bulgaria	323	310
Greece	N/A	276
Including ancestry	87,164	64,918

==== Turkish Cypriot population ====
In 1993 a publication from the Council of Europe reported that 30,000 Turkish Cypriot immigrants were living in Australia. By 2001 the TRNC Ministry of Foreign Affairs claimed to represent 40,000 Turkish Cypriots (i.e. TRNC citizens only) living in Australia. More recently, in 2016, Dr Levent Vahdettin et al. said that the total Turkish Cypriot Australian community was 120,000 - including descendants.

==== Mainland Turkish population ====
In 1999, Rob White et al. said that there was 75,000 people who were Turkish-born or had a Turkish immigrant background in Australia. By 2011 Dr Liza Hopkins said that within 35 years, between 1967 and 2002, the Turkish-immigrant community and their descendants had risen to 100,000. More recently, the Turkish origin population in Australia (i.e. excluding Turkish Cypriots etc.) was 200,000 in 2017.

==== Other Turkish populations ====
There are smaller populations of Turkish ancestry who have immigrated to Australia from Bulgaria, the Western Thrace area of northern Greece, North Macedonia, as well as some who had migrated via Germany and other Western European countries.

=== Settlement ===
Turkish Australians mainly live in New South Wales and Victoria, especially in the cities of Melbourne and Sydney. In Melbourne they reside largely in the northern suburbs of Broadmeadows, Dallas, Roxburgh Park and Meadow Heights. In Sydney, they are concentrated in Auburn. Turkish communities are very well established in regional areas of Australia as well, including Shepparton-Mooroopna in regional Victoria, Bundaberg and the Darling Downs in regional Queensland.

=== Religion ===
Religion of Australians born in Turkey
1. Islam (67.6%)
2. No religion (20.6%)
3. Oriental Orthodox (1.70%)
4. Eastern Orthodox (1.60%)
5. Others (8.50%)

In 2016, Muslim community representing 64% from Turkish Australians population (32,178 people), where 19.1% as Non-Religious, 2.4% as Oriental Orthodox, 2.2% as Eastern Orthodox, 4.5% as Other religion and 7.3% as Not stated.

In 2021, population of Turkish Australians (38,586 people in 2021) were identifying as Muslim increased to 67.6%, were 20.6% as Non-Religious, 1.7% as Oriental Orthodox, 1.6% as Eastern Orthodox and 8.5% as Other religion.

== Culture ==
Community bonds remain strong in the Turkish Australian community. They are geographically concentrated in particular areas of Australia which has led to the maintenance of certain cultural traditions across generations. More generally, notions of family loyalty, the social organisation of marriage and traditional segregation of gender roles have shaped the youths' identities in Australia.

=== Religion ===
Turkish Cypriots are considered to be the first immigrants in Australia who formed a large Muslim community, followed by immigrants from Turkey and then Lebanon. According to the 2006 Australian census, 18% of Australian Muslims are of Turkish origin. Turkish Australian Muslims practice a "moderate Islam" and are significantly secularised; Turkish Cypriots in particular are not so religious and are brought up as Kemalists and are strongly secular.

The Turkish Australian community favours religious sermons in the Turkish language (rather than in Arabic) and attends Friday prayers in Turkish mosques. There are numerous notable Turkish mosques in Australia; in 1992, the Cyprus Turkish Islamic Society constructed an Ottoman-style mosque, known as the Sunshine Mosque, which was designed to mirror the Sultan Ahmed Mosque in Istanbul. Another important Turkish mosque is the Auburn Gallipoli Mosque, which attracts about 800 worshippers every week and is listed as an Australian heritage building. Thomastown Mosque was built (early 1990s) by the Thomastown Turkish Islamic Society.

According to the 2016 Census, a majority (67.1%) of the Turkey-born population in Victoria was Muslim. Approximately 16.4% of the Turks were not religious, while the largest Christian denominations were the Oriental Orthodox Churches (2.4%), Eastern Orthodox Churches (2.0%), the Catholic Church (1.2%) and other churches (1.6%). The rest of the population belong to other religions or did not state their religious affiliation.

=== Language ===
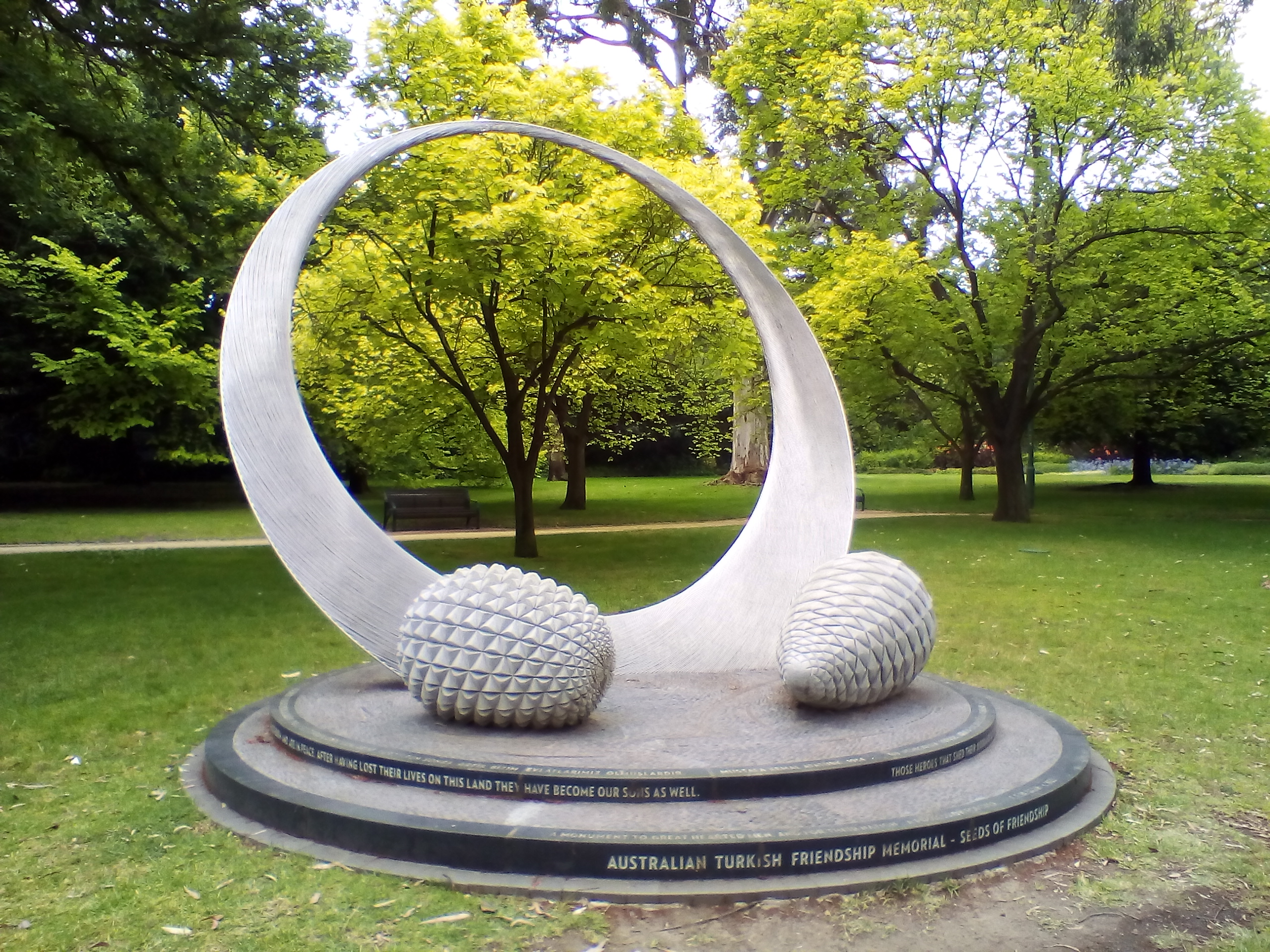
The Australian Turkish Friendship Memorial commissioned by the Turkish Sub-branch of the Victorian RSL honours WWI fallen soldiers and is a tribute to Australian-Turkish relations

The Turkish language is well maintained in Australia and is seen as very important for the self-identification of Turkish Australians. There are numerous Turkish private schools, including Ilim College, Irfan College, Sirius (previously known as Isik) College, Damla College and Burc College that cater for Turkish Australian students.

== Media ==
=== Newspapers ===
There are several Turkish language newspapers produced in Australia and generally available free of charge, including Turkish News Press, Anadolu, Yeni Vatan, Dünya, Camia, Zaman, and the Australian Turkish News Weekly.

=== Radio ===
The Australian Voice of Turkey currently broadcasts 7 days a week through the digital station 2TripleO which is based in Burwood in Sydney. Also, in Sydney and Melbourne SBS Radio broadcasts in the Turkish language for an hour a day. Other community stations also broadcast in Turkish, though with less hours of content. For example, 3ZZZ currently produces five hours of Turkish programming spread over four days each week.

=== Television ===
Turkish satellite television services are available in Australia. The Australian satellite service provider UBI World TV claims to reach 40,000 Turkish speakers. Furthermore, BRT, the official radio and television broadcasting corporation of Northern Cyprus, claims to reach 60,000 Turkish Cypriot Australians.

== See also ==
- Australia–Turkey relations
- Australians in Turkey
- Albion Rovers FC (Cairnlea), football club established by the Turkish Cypriot community
- Hume City FC, football club established by the Turkish community
- Kemal Atatürk Memorial, Canberra

== Notes ==
a: The 2006 census recorded a further 4,120 "Cypriots"; however, it is unclear whether these include Greek Cypriots or Turkish Cypriots.

== Bibliography ==
- Akbarzadeh, Shahram (2001), "Unity or Fragmentation?", in Saeed, Abdullah; Akbarzadeh, Shahram (eds.), Muslim Communities in Australia, University of New South Wales, ISBN 0-86840-580-9.
- Ali, Lütfiye; Sonn, Christopher C. (2010), "Constructing Identity as a Second-Generation Cypriot Turkish in Australia: The Multi-hyphenated Other", Culture & Psychology, 16 (3), Sage: 416–436, doi:10.1177/1354067x10361398, S2CID 145803244
- Babacan, Hürriyet (2001), "Turks", in Jupp, James (ed.), The Australian People: An Encyclopedia of the Nation, Its People and Their Origins, Cambridge University Press, ISBN 0-521-80789-1.
- Cleland, Bilal (2001), "The History of Muslims in Australia", in Saeed, Abdullah; Akbarzadeh, Shahram (eds.), Muslim Communities in Australia, University of New South Wales, ISBN 0-86840-580-9.
- Department of Immigration and Citizenship (2006), Community Information Summary:Turkey-born (PDF), Australian Government
- Docker, John; Fischer, Gerhard (2000), Race, Colour, and Identity in Australia and New Zealand, UNSW Press, ISBN 0-86840-538-8.
- Hopkins, Liza (2009), "Turkish Transnational Media in Melbourne: a Migrant Mediascape" (PDF), International Journal on Multicultural Societies, 11 (2): 230–247
- Hopkins, Liza (2011), "A Contested Identity: Resisting the Category Muslim-Australian", Immigrants & Minorities, 29 (1), Routledge: 110–131, doi:10.1080/02619288.2011.553139, S2CID 145324792
- Humphrey, Michael (2001), "An Australian Islam? Religion in the Multicultural City", in Saeed, Abdullah; Akbarzadeh, Shahram (eds.), Muslim Communities in Australia, University of New South Wales, ISBN 0-86840-580-9.
- Humphrey, Michael (2009), "Securitisation and Domestication of Diaspora Muslims and Islam: Turkish immigrants in Germany and Australia" (PDF), International Journal on Multicultural Societies, 11 (2): 136–154
- Hüssein, Serkan (2007), Yesterday & Today: Turkish Cypriots of Australia, Serkan Hussein, ISBN 978-0-646-47783-1.
- Inglis, K. S. (2008), Sacred Places: War Memorials in the Australian Landscape, The Miegunyah Press, ISBN 978-0-522-85479-4.
- Inglis, Christine; Akgönül, Samim; de Tapia, Stéphane (2009), "Turks Abroad: Settlers, Citizens, Transnationals –Introduction" (PDF), International Journal on Multicultural Societies, 11 (2): 104–118
- Kabir, Nahid Afrose (2004). Muslims in Australia: Immigration, Race Relations and Cultural History. Routledge. ISBN 9781136214998.
- Papadakis, Yiannis; Peristianis, Nicos; Welz, Gisela (2006), Divided Cyprus: Modernity, History, and an Island in Conflict, Bloomington: Indiana University Press, ISBN 0-253-21851-9.
- Saeed, Abdullah (2003), Islam in Australia, Allen & Unwin, ISBN 1-86508-864-1.
- Şenay, Banu (2009), "A "Condition of Homelessness" or a "State of Double Consciousness"? Turkish Migrants and Home-Making in Australia" (PDF), International Journal on Multicultural Societies, 11 (2): 248–263
- White, Rob; Perrone, Santina; Guerra, Carmel; Lampugnani, Rosario (1999), Ethnic Youth Gangs in Australia Do They Exist?: Report No. 2 Turkish Young People (PDF), Australian Multicultural Foundation.
- Windle, Joel (2009), ""Soft" and "Hard" Landings: the Experience of School under Contrasting Institutional Arrangements in Australia and France" (PDF), International Journal on Multicultural Societies, 11 (2): 174–194
- Yağmur, Kutlay (2004), "Issues in finding the appropriate methodology in language attrition research", in Schmid, Monika S.; Köpke, Barbara; Keijzer, Merel; et al. (eds.), First Language Attrition: Interdisciplinary Perspectives on Methodological Issues, John Benjamins Publishing Company, ISBN 90-272-4139-2.
- Zevallos, Zuleyka (2008), "'You Have to be Anglo and Not Look Like Me': identity and belonging among young women of Turkish and Latin American backgrounds in Melbourne, Australia", Australian Geographer, 39 (1), Routledge: 21–43, Bibcode:2008AuGeo..39...21Z, doi:10.1080/00049180701877410, hdl:1959.3/30204, S2CID 56431274
