= Tempe High School =

Tempe High School may refer to these high schools:

- Tempe High School (Sydney), Australia
- Tempe High School (Arizona), United States
