= List of ambassadors of Turkey to Australia =

The ambassador of Turkey to Australia is the official representative of the president and the government of the Republic of Turkey to the prime minister and government of the Commonwealth of Australia.

== List of ambassadors ==
Ambassador	Term start	Term end	Ref.
Baha Vefa Karatay	15 March 1967	7 November 1968	
Mehmet Baydur	17 December 1968	6 November 1972	
Hikmet Bensan	30 December 1972	29 July 1978	
Hasan Üner	1 August 1978	29 July 1981	
Faruk Şahinbaş	20 August 1981	3 March 1991	
Ergün Pelit	31 March 1988	5 December 1991	
Orhan Aka	16 December 1991	30 May 1995	
Bilal Niyazi Şimşir	13 June 1995	18 March 1998	
Umut Arık	23 April 1998	25 September 2001	
M. Tansu Okandan	1 October 2001	5 January 2006	
N. Murat Ersavcı	16 January 2006	12 October 2009	
Oğuz Özge	22 October 2009	1 July 2012	
Reha Keskintepe	1 July 2012	31 July 2015	
Vakur Gökdenizler	30 September 2015	9 January 2019	
Korhan Karakoç	15 January 2019	24 January 2023	
Ufuk Gezer	26 January 2023	Present	

== See also ==
- Australia–Turkey relations
- List of ambassadors of Australia to Turkey
