= Tempe High School (Sydney) =

Secondary school in New South Wales, Australia

Location
- Unwins Bridge Road, Tempe, Sydney, New South Wales; Australia; 33°55′12″S 151°9′40″E

Information
- Type: Government-funded co-educational dual modality partially academically selective and comprehensive secondary day school
- Motto: Latin: Labora Fortiter (Work Hard)
- Established: 1874; 152 years ago
- Educational authority: New South Wales Department of Education
- Principal: Vanessa Williams
- Years: 7–12
- Enrolment: 900 (2012)
- Campus type: Suburban
- Colours: Maroon and black
- Website: tempe-h.schools.nsw.gov.au

Tempe High School is a government-funded co-educational dual modality partially academically selective and comprehensive secondary day school, located in Tempe, an inner-western suburb of Sydney, New South Wales, Australia.

== History ==
After an unsuccessful 1863 application to establish a school in Tempe, in 1872, local residents raised £A200 in funds to build a public school. Tempe Public School, a stone rubble building with an adjoining teacher's residence, opened on the site of the current high school in 1874.

Land opposite of the school was purchased in 1908, and a new two-storey primary department building was erected. A separate girls' department was established in 1910, and in 1923, a large new primary building, containing twelve classrooms, was opened.

In 1949, the school became a boys' intermediate school. Subsequently, in 1955, the school was designated a junior technical high school.

In 1973, a library and science building was constructed. The teacher's residence in the original school building was demolished in 1974, and a new three-storey classroom block was built. Then, in 1975, Tempe Boys and Arncliffe Girls high schools progressively merged to become Tempe High School. The 1923 primary building would then be converted into an industrial technology and arts facility.

In 1994, the school was featured in an SBS documentary, The School of Babel. The film explored the school's large migrant population and the effect of teaching students their native languages on their English marks. It featured a visit from Harvard University's head of education at the time, Professor Courtney Cazden.

A 2004 proposal failed to combine Tempe, Dulwich Hill, Marrickville and Newtown high schools into a multi-campus college due to falling enrolments. Instead, from 2005, the school became partially selective offering places based on academic performance as well as accepting local students.

In 2017, there was controversy among parents surrounding the school principal's threat of suspension for uniform violations. The school purchased and converted a bus in 2019 into a "hangout space" to help Year 12 students deal with HSC stress.

The school was used as a filming location for the 2024 Stan original series Critical Incident.

== Notable alumni ==
- Tim Cahill – Soccer Player (disputed)
- Col Joye – Entertainer
- Bob Simpson – Cricketer
- Anba Suriel – Coptic Orthodox Bishop

== See also ==
- List of government schools in New South Wales
- List of selective high schools in New South Wales
