= Australians in Turkey =

Australian community in Turkey

There are approximately 12,000 Australians in Turkey. Of these, the overwhelming majority are in the capital Ankara (roughly 10,000), and the remainder are mostly in Istanbul. Australian expatriates in Turkey form one of the largest overseas Australian groups in Europe and Asia. The vast majority of Australian nationals in Turkey are Turkish Australians.

A defining moment for Australians in Turkey was when the Australian and New Zealand Army Corps (ANZAC) engaged in battle in the Gallipoli Peninsula, which later became known as Anzac Cove, on the 25th of April 1915 during World War 1. The day of remembrance that commemorates the efforts of the ANZACs falls on 25 April every year and is known as Anzac Day.

== Australians in Gallipoli ==
The landing of Gallipoli was on the 25th of April 1915. Australia, New Zealand, England, and France landed at the Gallipoli Peninsula on the 25th of April 1915 with the aim of capturing the Turkish capital, Constantinople, which would force the surrender of the Ottoman Empire. Australia and New Zealand sent 16,000 troops, who, prior to the landing of Gallipoli, spent four and a half months training in Cairo from August 1914. This was where the Australian and New Zealand forces were combined into one corps, Australia and New Zealand Army Corps (ANZAC). The role of the Australians during the campaign was to gain the Sari Bair range and advance on a hill, Mal Tepe. By the end of the first day of the Gallipoli campaign, 2,000 Anzacs had been wounded or killed. The Gallipoli campaign lasted eight months, which was much longer than intended. By the end of the eight months, the Anzacs had barely advanced from the first day of the landings. Though it was considered a military failure, it demonstrated "bravery, ingenuity, endurance and mateship", which are now regarded as "defining aspects of the Australian character". The Anzacs were evacuated from the peninsula in late December 1915 with a total of 26,111 Australian casualties, and 8,141 Australian deaths throughout the entire campaign. There were no deaths during the evacuation of the Anzacs. The battle in Gallipoli was, at the time, the greatest loss of life of Australian troops in war.

Gallipoli Peninsula is now known as ‘Anzac Cove’ after the Turkish government officially changed the name in 1985 as per the request of the Australian government in 1984. As part of this agreement, the Australian Government gave the name ‘Gallipoli Reach’ to a section of Lake Burley Griffin in Canberra, and the name ‘Atatürk Entrance’ to a section of Princes Royal Harbour in Albany, Western Australia, to commemorate the first Australian convoy that left for Europe during the war in 1914.

== Anzac Day in Turkey ==
Anzac Day is celebrated in Australia, New Zealand, and Turkey, on 25 April, the anniversary of the Anzacs' landing at Anzac Cove in 1915. Attendance at Anzac Day commemorative events at Anzac Cove has drastically increased since the 75th anniversary in 1990. Since then, approximately 10,000 Australian and New Zealanders gather in Çanakkale, Eceabat, and Gelibolu, where they hold a memorial service at dawn each year. The Australian and New Zealand governments work with the Turkish government each year to plan the commemorative events in Turkey, where Australian officials often lead the event in Turkey. People can only attend these events if they have an attendance pass issued by the Australian Department of Veteran Affairs.

Anzac Day in 2015 was the 100 year anniversary of the landing at Gallipoli. This was the largest Anzac Day event in Turkey, for which planning began five years prior in 2010. In 2010, the "National Commission on the Commemoration of the Anzac Centenary", a public fund board, and an advisory board were created by the Australian government. It was celebrated by politicians such as Prince Charles, former New Zealand Prime Minister John Key, former Australian Prime Minister Tony Abbott, Turkish President Recep Tayyip Erdogan, former Australian defence force chief Mark Binskin, New Zealand's defence force chief Tim Keating, and various British royals. 10,500 tickets were made available to Australians and New Zealanders, with 8,120 distributed to Australians and 2,030 to New Zealanders. People wishing to attend had to apply for tickets and register for their country's respective ballot. 42,000 Australians registered for the ballot. 350 tickets were distributed to officials from all nations involved in the Gallipoli campaign, 100 of which went to Turkish people. They attended the commemorative events on the shores of Anzac Cove alongside people from Turkey, Britain, and the rest of the world.

== Australian Embassy in Turkey ==
There is not a sole Australian Embassy for Turkey, but there is the Australian Embassy for Turkey, Azerbaijan, and Georgia. The Embassy in Turkey is located in Ankara with consulates being located in Istanbul and Çanakkale. They deal with a range of matters, including consular services for Australians living and travelling through Turkey, passport services for Australians, visas, immigration, citizenship, travelling to Australia and assistance throughout the COVID-19 pandemic, students wishing to travel to Australia to study, people wishing to do business, trade, or investment in Australia, diplomatic relations, defence, and security matters.

On 6 October 2021, Australian senator Marise Payne announced the appointment of Mr Miles Armitage as Australia's ambassador to Turkey. He is also accredited in Georgia and Azerbaijan. Mr Armitage was previously the Ambassador to Jordan and Timor-Leste. His roles include organisation of Anzac Day commemorations, cooperation on security, and participation in the G20 and MIKTA Forums.

== Australian culture in Turkey ==
In 2015, the same year as the 100 year anniversary of the landing at Gallipoli, the Australian government planned "Australia in Turkey 2015", Australia's biggest festival in Turkey celebrating Australian culture. It was an initiative by The Australian Department of Foreign Affairs and Trade, and was funded by the Australian International Cultural Council. Despite it being in 2015, it was to be distinguished from broader Anzac commemorative events. Events were predominantly in Istanbul and Ankara. It was a four-month celebration from September to December that featured Australian performances, culinary events, sport, and more.

The Bangarra Dance Theatre were among some of the Australian groups who performed at this festival. The 16-member group performed “Spirit”, a performance where the dancers explored identity, inequality, and climate change, whilst representing indigenous Australians overseas. They performed at the Zorlu Performing Arts Centre in Istanbul. The Flying Fruit Circus, Australia's national youth circus, also performed at the Zorlu Performing Arts Centre. Strange Fruit, a Melbourne based performing arts company, also performed on five meter high flexible poles at various venues around Istanbul, including Ortaköy Square and the Zorlu Performing Arts Centre. The festival also featured a pop up restaurant by a sustainable Melbourne-based landscape designer and activist, Joost Bakker. This restaurant promoted sustainable living and design and was located in Istanbul's Sishane Park. An exhibition titled “Concrete” by Monash University Museum of art operated at the Mimar Sinan Fine Arts University, Tophane-i Amire Culture and Arts Center. This exhibition interpreted the concepts of construction and destruction and was curated by Australian and Turkish artists accompanied by artists from France, Spain, Croatia, the United Kingdom, Italy, and Syria. It was developed to mark the 100 year anniversary of World War I and the Battle of Gallipoli. The 14th Istanbul Biennial occurred during this festival, where noticeable Indigenous artists and prominent artworks were displayed, where viewers experienced the struggles Indigenous peoples have endured, including regarding the Yirrkala Bark and Thumb Print petitions. Australian and Turkish architects collaborated in a modern architecture workshop that highlighted the modern technology available in the field. The Edge was a project by the Queensland State Library that explored sustainable manufacturing, and focused predominantly on biofabrication. The festival also featured an educational seminar by the Stephanie Alexander Kitchen Garden Foundation, and a collaboration between the Adelaide Film Festival and Gastronomika. Tropfest, the world's largest short film festival was held in Istanbul for this festival, and the Turkish Mountain Bike Championship was held with Australians competing with Turks.

== Australian tourism in Turkey ==
Due to the relaxation of travel restrictions imposed due to the COVID-19 pandemic, fully vaccinated Australians are permitted to enter Turkey for tourism since December 2021. A mandatory proof of vaccination exists for all Australians wishing to enter Turkey, on departure and arrival, except for children under the age of 12. Proof of pre-departure negative COVID-19 tests is not needed for fully vaccinated travelers from Australia. There is a possibility that travelers from Australia will have to comply with a COVID-19 test upon arrival, or to quarantine for at least 10 days.

As announced by Turkish authorities, visas for Australians wishing to travel in Turkey will not be issued upon arrival from 10 April 2014. Instead, Australian travelers must apply for a visa online, whether their travel be for tourism or business. To travel to Turkey from Australia, one must hold an electronic visitor visa and a passport issued by Australia. Visas for types of travel other than business or tourism must be requested through a Turkish Embassy or Consulate. Since 1 February 2012, tourists in Turkey may only stay for a maximum of 90 days within a 180-day period.

== See also ==
- Australian diaspora
- Australia–Turkey relations
- Turkish Australians
