= Australia–Turkey relations =

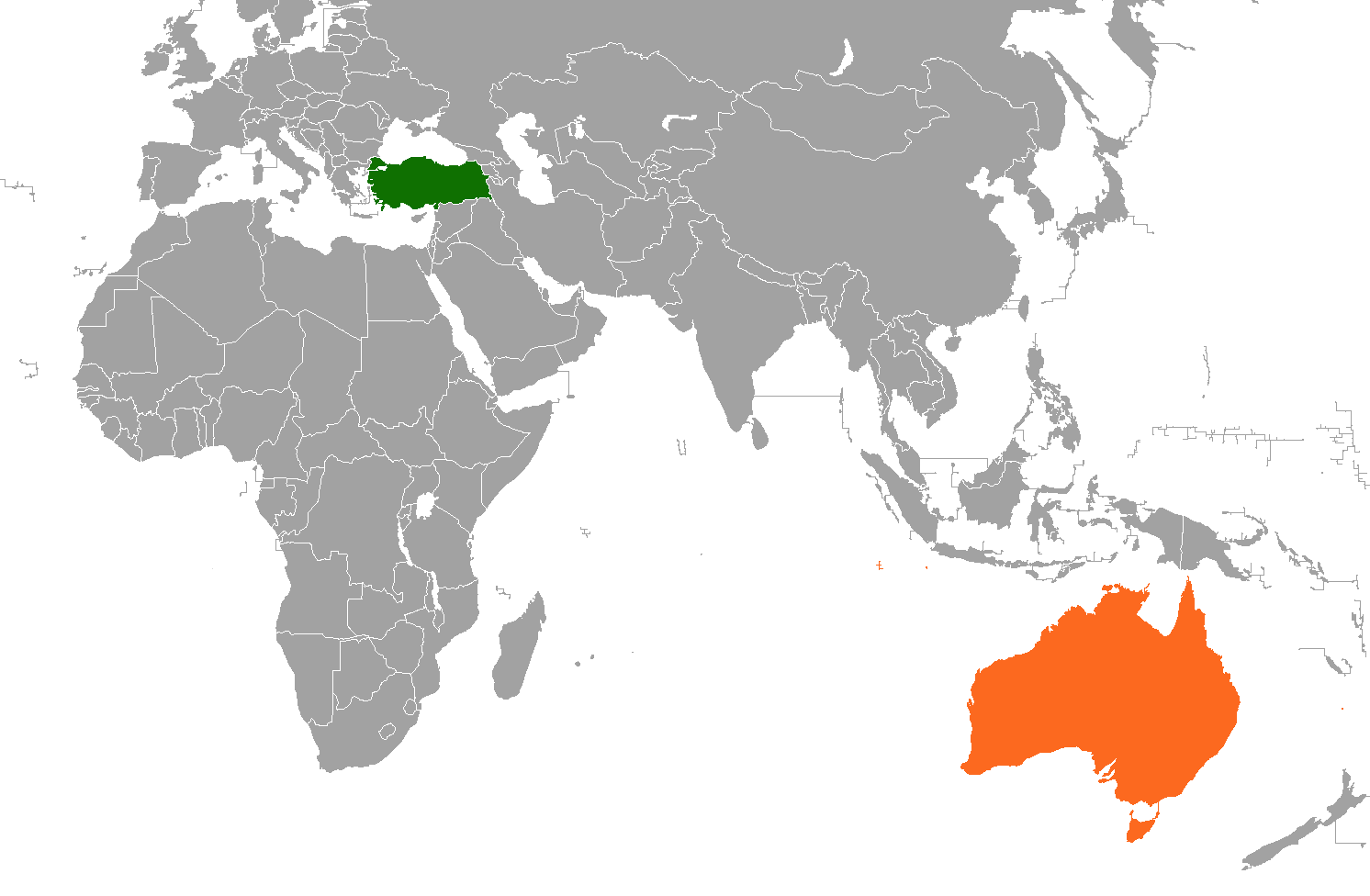

- Turkey: Australia

Monthly value of Australian merchandise exports to Turkey (A$ millions) since 1988

Monthly value of Turkish merchandise exports to Australia (A$ millions) since 1988

Foreign relations exist between the Commonwealth of Australia and the Republic of Türkiye. Diplomatic relations between the two countries were established in 1967. Australia has had an embassy in Ankara since 1968, a consulate-general in Istanbul and a consulate in Çanakkale. Turkey has had an embassy in Canberra since 1967 and two consulates-general in Melbourne and Sydney.

== History ==
=== Gallipoli campaign ===
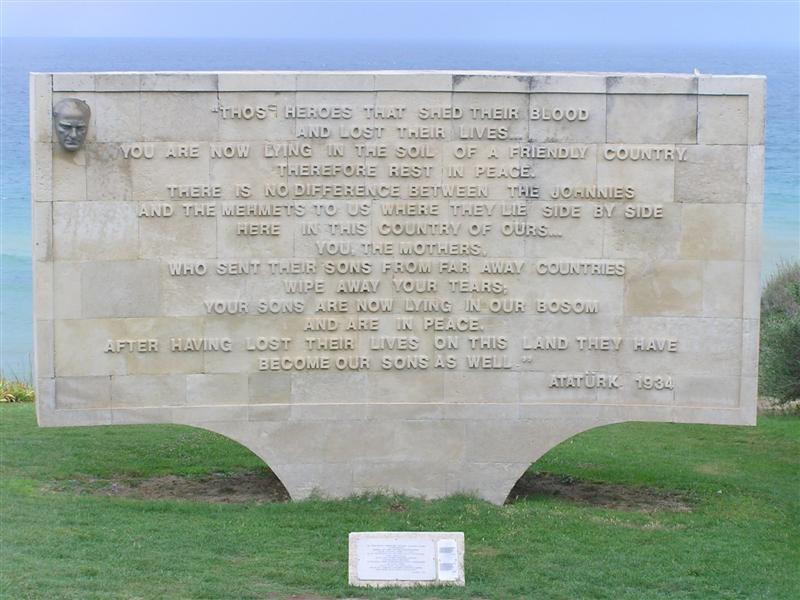
Memorial of ANZAC Cove; commemorating the loss of thousands of Turkish and Anzac soldiers in Gallipoli

The first encounter of Turkey and Australia was on the battlefields of Çanakkale. Allied troops from the British Empire, France and Russia landed in Gallipoli to secure passage through the Dardanelles, providing a naval route to Russia, an allied power.

In 1934, Mustafa Kemal Atatürk, allegedly sent a message to the Australian and New Zealander mothers and is as follows:

Those heroes that shed their blood and lost their lives… you are now lying in the soil of a friendly country. Therefore rest in peace. There is no difference between the Johnnies and the Mehmets where they lie side by side here in this country of ours… You the mothers who sent their sons from far away countries, wipe away your tears. Your sons are now lying in our bosom and are in peace. Having lost their lives on this land they have become our sons as well.

However, Atatürk never said this, it was made up by Şükrü Kaya for diplomatic reasons. In fact, Atatürk considered the ANZACs to have been invaders and considered them inferior to the Turks. This alleged quote has also been recently used by Turkish diplomats to counter Armenian, Greek and Assyrian genocide recognition efforts in Australia.

The Çanakkale Battles are commemorated every year in Çanakkale on 24–25 April, with a wide participation from Australian and Turkish people alike. In Australia and New Zealand, as well as several other South Pacific nations, a public holiday is held for the event, known as Anzac Day. It is an important date on the Australian and New Zealand calendars, commemorating the sacrifices made by Australian and New Zealand soldiers in all battles and wars. Traditionally in these countries, a memorial service is observed at around 5:30 AM, known as a Dawn Service. This is a symbolic gesture to the troops that landed on the Gallipoli Peninsula at dawn. In 1985, 70 years after the battle, the Turkish government officially recognized the name ANZAC Cove, the location where the troops landed.

=== Armenian genocide ===
The forged dominant narrative of the ANZAC campaign in today's Australia has been argued to overshadow the history of the Armenian, Greek and Assyrian genocides, often erasing Australian voices that confirm them.

Australian academic Catherine Simpson calls the Gallipoli-induced "friendship" a "government-constructed and media-supported" project. She also notes that, according to Robert Manne, there exists "a cultural amnesia about the Armenian genocide – an event that occurred simultaneously with the Dardanelles campaign – currently prevails in Australia". Manne also writes that "in the Australian collective memory of Gallipoli, the Armenian genocide simply has no role, I suspect it never will", despite the fact that the Gallipoli campaign "pushed on and maybe not exactly caused, but at least triggered the final events that led to the genocide", according to Mark Colvin. Simpson writes that "The Armenian genocide tarnishes the carefully constructed image of the ‘noble Turk’ and the Australian–Turkish friendship, thus it is conveniently excised from Australian accounts".

The Australian states of New South Wales, South Australia and Tasmania, i.e. half of Australia's states, have recognized the Armenian, Greek and Assyrian genocides. The federal government has not yet made such a recognition.

=== Since World War I ===
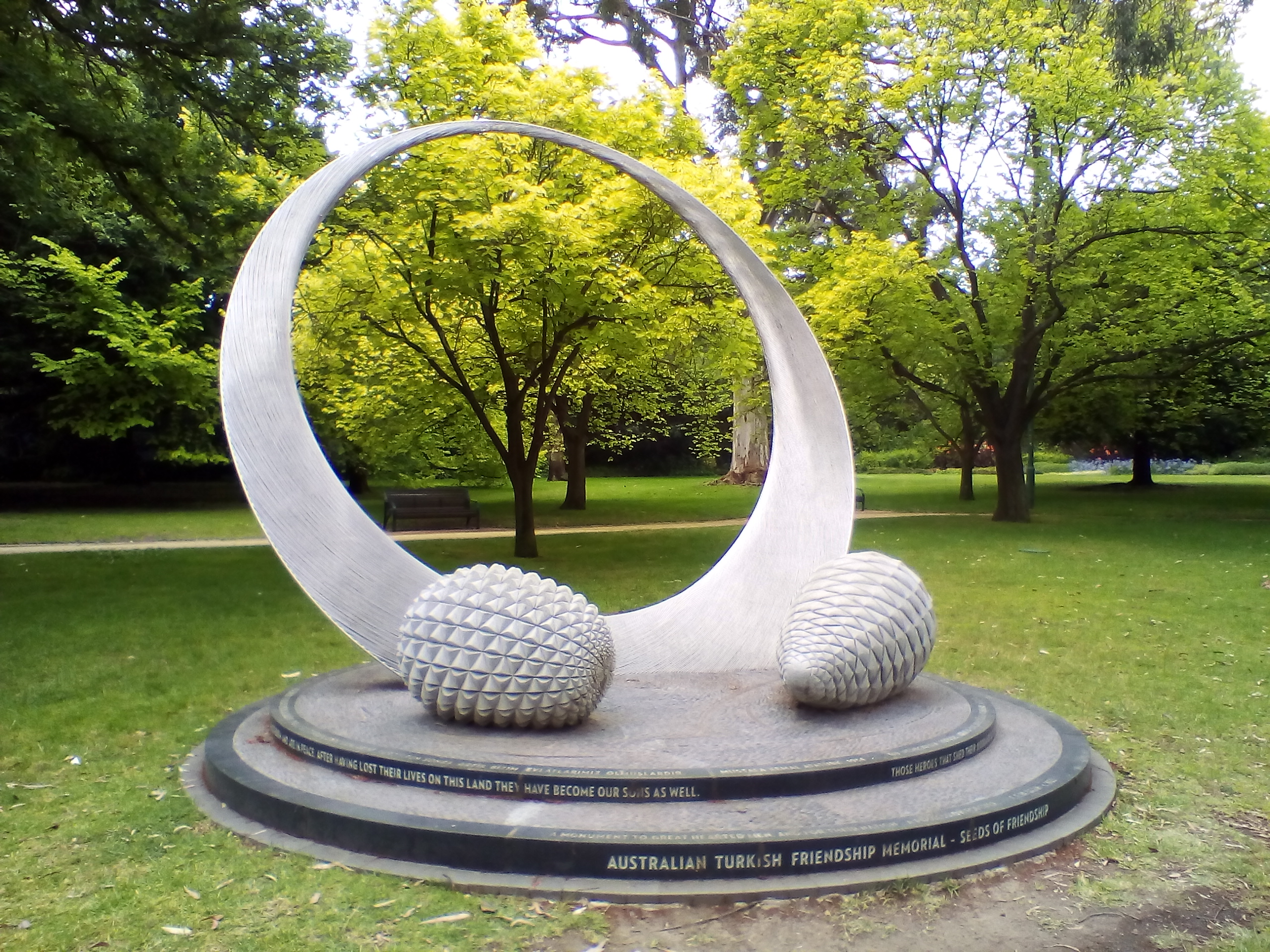
The Australian Turkish Friendship Memorial honours WWI fallen soldiers and is a tribute to Australian-Turkish relations

==== Contemporary ====
On 5 October 1967, the governments of Australia and Turkey signed an agreement to allow Turkish citizens to immigrate to Australia. Prior to this recruitment agreement, there were less than 3,000 people of Turkish origin in Australia. According to the Australian Bureau of Statistics, nearly 19,000 Turkish immigrants arrived from 1968 to 1974. The first Turkish immigrants were greeted at Sydney Airport by Turkish Cypriots, whilst Turkish immigrants who moved to Melbourne were greeted at Essendon Airport by members of the Cyprus Turkish Association. They came largely from rural areas of Turkey; at the time, approximately 30% were skilled and 70% were unskilled workers. However, this changed in the 1980s when the number of skilled Turks applying to enter Australia had increased considerably. Over the next 35 years the Turkish population rose to almost 100,000. More than half of the Turkish community settled in Victoria, mostly in the north-western suburbs of Melbourne.

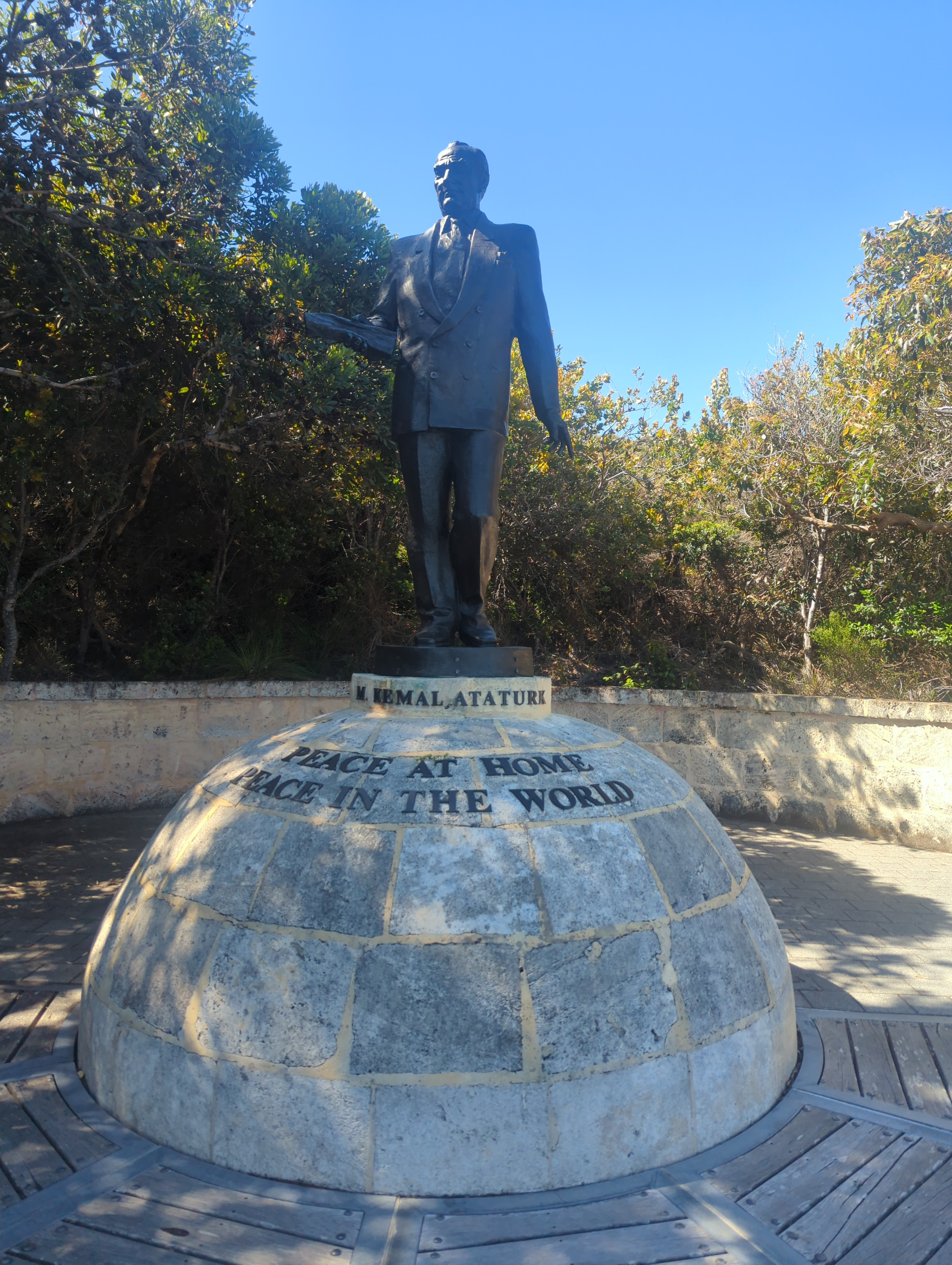
Atatürk Monument in Albany, Western Australia The construction of Atatürk memorials in Australia are considered a proof of an evident "incursion of Turkish state politics" into Australian public places by many community members who oppose their construction.

A ballot was held to allocate passes for Australians and New Zealanders wishing to attend Anzac Day commemorations at Gallipoli in 2015. Of the 10,500 people who could be safely, securely and comfortably accommodated at the Anzac Commemorative Site, in 2015 this comprised places for 8,000 Australians, 2,000 New Zealanders and 500 official representatives of all nations involved in the Gallipoli campaign. Only those who received an offer of attendance passes attended the commemorations in 2015.

In March 2019, Australian Prime Minister Scott Morrison condemned "reckless" and "highly offensive" comments made by Turkish president Recep Tayyip Erdoğan. Erdoğan repeatedly showed video taken by the Christchurch mosque shooter to his supporters at campaign rallies for upcoming local elections and said Australians and New Zealanders who came to Turkey with anti-Muslim sentiments "would be sent back in coffins like their grandfathers were" during the Gallipoli campaign of World War I.

== See also ==
- Foreign relations of Australia
- Foreign relations of Turkey
- List of ambassadors of Turkey to Australia
- List of ambassadors of Australia to Turkey
- Australians in Turkey
- Turkish Australians
