= Australia–Egypt relations =

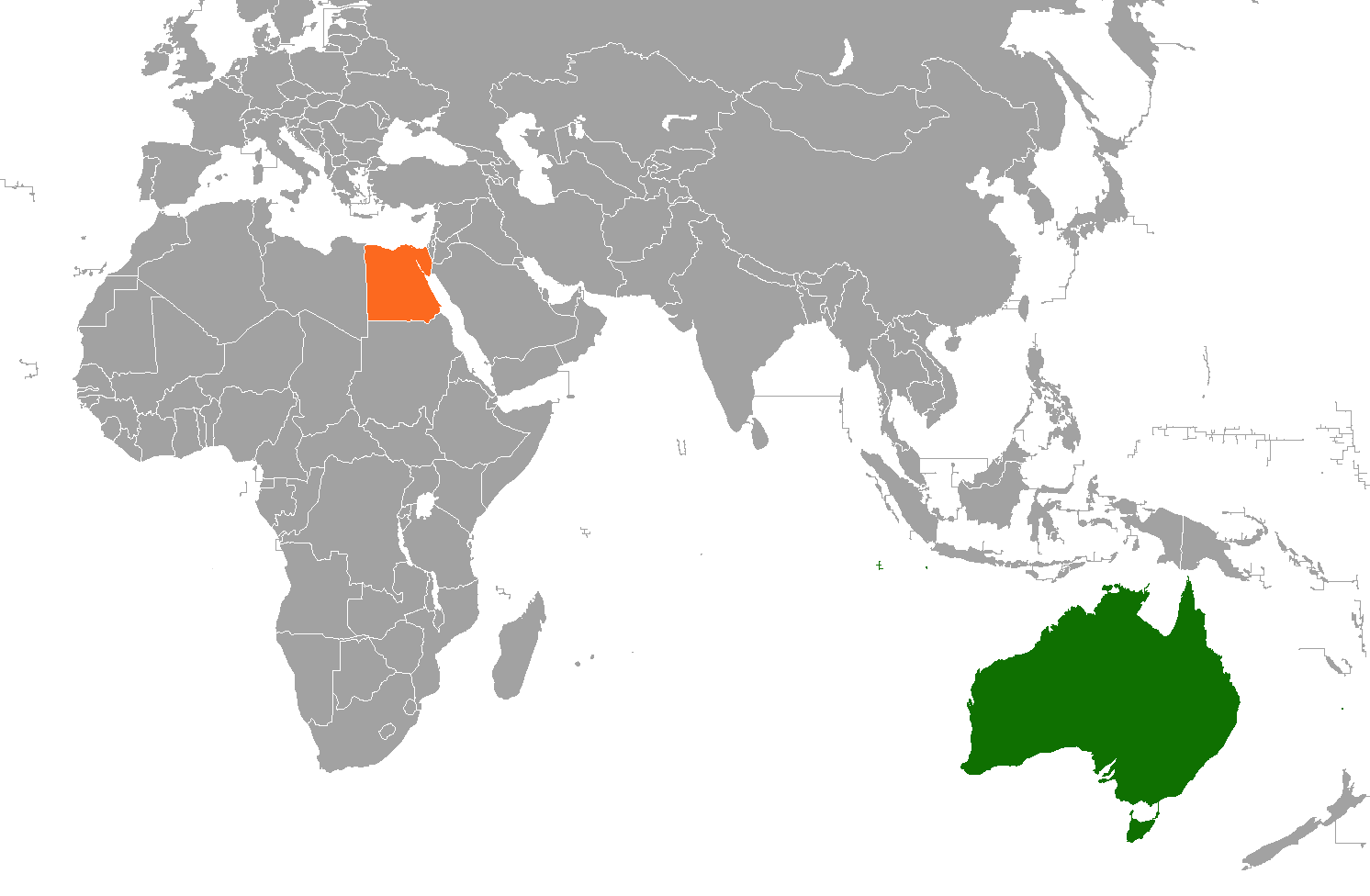

- Australia: Egypt

Monthly value of Australian merchandise exports to Egypt (A$ millions) since 1988

Foreign relations between Australia and Egypt have been formally established since 1950.

== History ==
Australian soldiers were stationed in Egypt in both world wars. After almost a century, the main traffic between Australia and Europe has passed the Suez Canal, Cairo was the main air link from Australia and London for many years. Diplomatic relations between Australia and Egypt were established between both countries on 23 July 1950 with the opening of an Australian legation in Cairo.

Following President Gamal Abdel Nasser's nationalisation of the Suez Canal in July 1956, Australian Prime Minister Robert Menzies lead a five-nation delegation to Cairo in August 1956 to negotiate with Nasser about the return of the Canal to international control. The Suez Canal was the preeminent economic trade route for Australia at that time. Diplomatic relations were broken by Egypt on 6 November 1956 in protest over subsequent Australian support for the Anglo-French invasion during the Suez Crisis. Relations were restored on 19 October 1959 and raised to embassy-level in 1961.

== Today ==
Australia and Egypt work constructively on international security issues such as counter-terrorism, disarmament, and the prevention of the proliferation of weapons of mass destruction. Australia has an embassy in Cairo, while Egypt has an embassy in Canberra and two Consulates-General (in Melbourne and Sydney).

Australia's current ambassador to Egypt is Axel Wabenhorst.

There is a 100,000 Egyptian diaspora in Australia and 40,000 residents in Australia who were born in Egypt as of 2023 per Wabenhorst in an interview on AhramOnline.

There are some Australian forces that monitor the peace treaty between Israel and Egypt in the Sinai.

Trade between Australia and Egypt was about $1 billion in 2021/22, Fava beans are Australia's main export to Egypt, Australia also exports alumni as well as paper and wool.

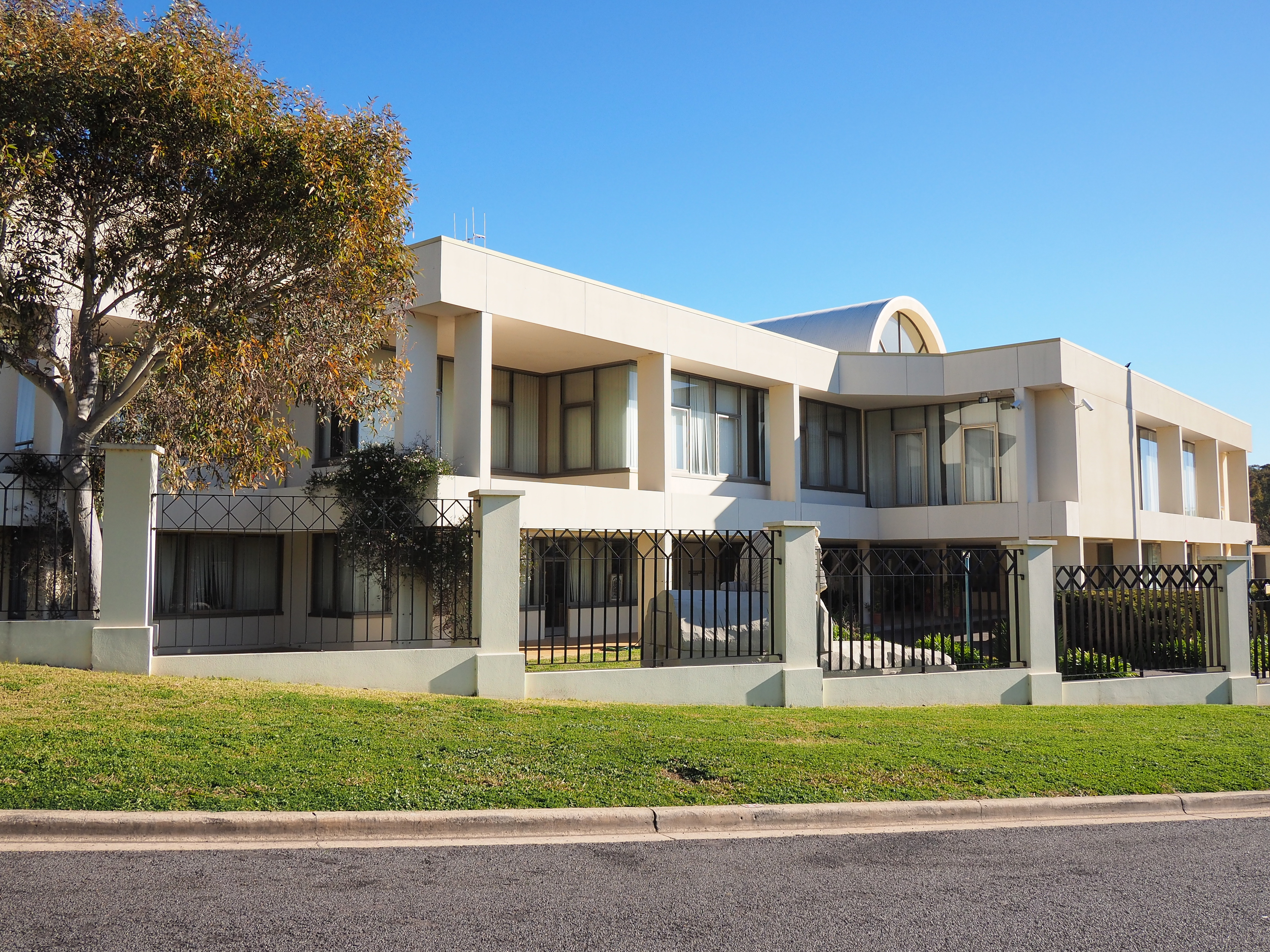
Embassy of Egypt in Canberra

== See also ==
- Foreign relations of Australia
- Foreign relations of Egypt
- Egyptian Australian
