= Dulwich High School of Visual Arts and Design =

Arts school in Sydney, Australia

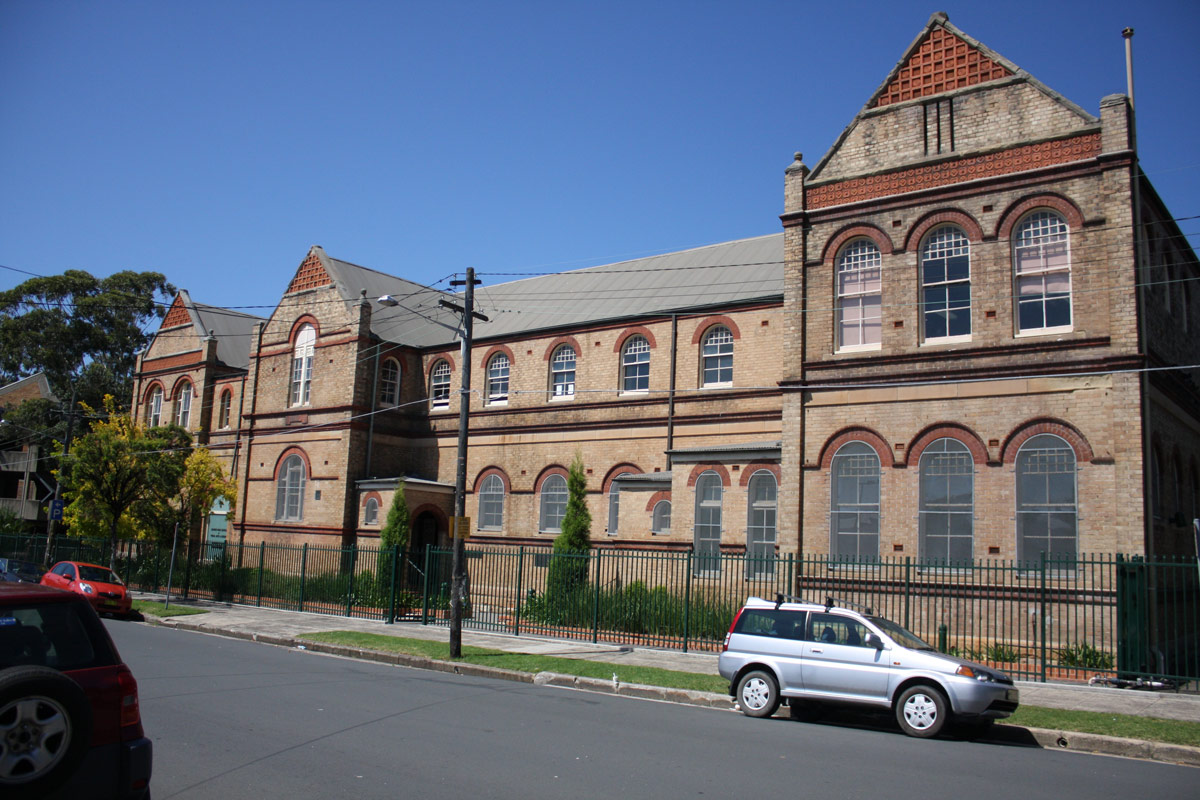
- School entrance

Location
- Dulwich Hill, Sydney, New South Wales; Australia; 33°54′15″S 151°8′40″E

Information
- Type: Government coeducational specialist secondary school
- Motto: Respect, Relationships, and Responsibility
- Established: 2003
- Specialist: Visual arts and Design
- Principal: Lance Raskall
- Teaching staff: 46
- Years: 7–12
- Enrolment: 969
- Colours: Black, white, blue-grey (seniors), and yellow
- Website: dulwich-h.schools.nsw.gov.au

Dulwich High School of Visual Arts & Design (abbreviated as DHSVAD) is a government coeducational specialist secondary school, with speciality in visual arts and design, located in Dulwich Hill, an Inner West suburb of Sydney, New South Wales, Australia.

Re-established in 2003, the school is run by the New South Wales Department of Education and Training. The School offers a comprehensive education program with a strong focus on visual arts and design throughout all years and subjects. DHSVAD is affiliated with the National Art School, The Design Centre Enmore TAFE, and The Art Gallery of New South Wales.

The School also runs a program called NEO. Year 8-10 Students engage in visual art and design-orientated workshops each week according to their area of interest. Subjects include Web Design, Robotics, Cartooning, Animation, Jewellery Making, Ceramics, Food Design, Design Your School Museum, and the most popular being Draw/Design/Make.

== History ==
The school officially became a Visual Arts and Design High School in 2003 as the first visual arts and design high school in New South Wales.

== School facilities ==
The campus is located on Seaview Street, Dulwich Hill off Marrickville Road. The campus has gardens, a paved playground, a grass oval, and a school vegetable garden. The various faculties within the school are located in different areas ranging from A to I Block including a covered basketball court (COLA) and a gymnasium located near the school canteen area.

There are various murals around the school produced by the "Street Art Club" as well as artwork displayed around the corridors and foyer areas. The school library provides a relaxed environment. The Visual Arts specialty building built in 2004, features specially designed visual arts studios, a digital media/computer room equipped with design software, an art gallery, and a sculpture garden. There are two additional art classrooms, a senior students' Body of Work Studio, and artist-in-residence room, a ceramics room, and photographic darkroom facilities.

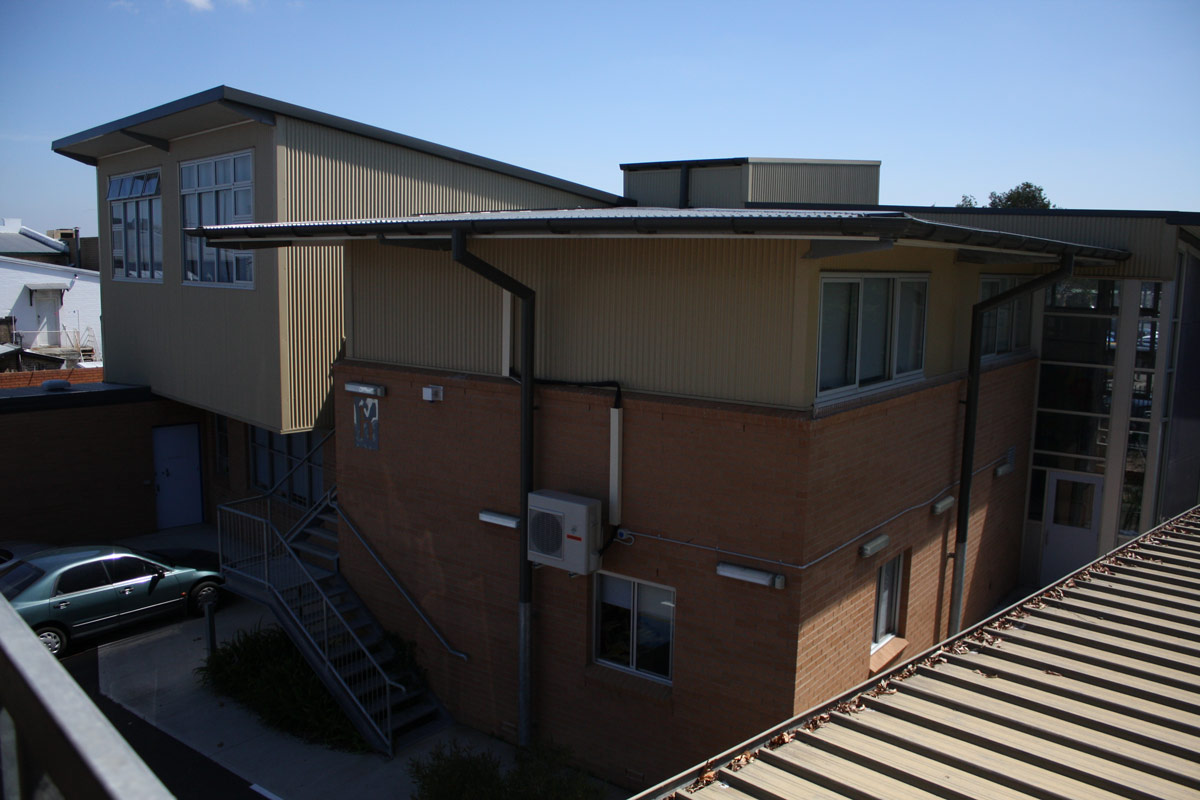
The Schools Art Building

== Faculty ==
The faculties in the school include:

- Design and Technology
- Drama
- English
- Gifted and Talented Programme
- Human Society and Its Environment
- Japanese Language
- Mathematics
- Music
- Personal Development, Health and Physical Education
- Science
- Special Needs Unit (IM and IO)
- Visual Arts

== Students ==
Year 7 intake is streamed into half local area intake and half visual arts and design specialist intake.

Students are picked for the specialist stream based on portfolio, interview, and academic history. Interview times for year 6 students applying for year 7 occur twice a year. Years 7 and 8 students receive additional allocated class time for visual arts lessons.

== School life ==
The school focuses on the "3 Rs" as its core guiding principle: Respect, Relationships, and Responsibility. Students come from a diverse range of cultural, ethnic, and economic backgrounds. The school is known for its acceptance of all kinds of people and is recognised as a "Proud School" which promotes equality of LGBTIQCAPGNGFNBA-identifying people. Diversity Day is an anticipated event in the school calendar.

== Support unit ==
The school has a total of three classes that cater to the specific learning needs of students from Year 7 to Year 12. There are two classes specialising in support for students with intellectually moderate disabilities (IO): Olley Class (IO) – Year 7, Year 8, and Year 9 Nolan Class (IO) – Year 10, Year 11, and Year 12. There is one class specialising in support for students with intellectually mild disabilities (IM)

Preston Class (IM) – Years 7–12.

== Events ==
Major yearly events:

- Diversity and wear it purple day
- Sports Day
- Yr 12 Graduation

== Notable former staff ==
- Anba Suriel

== See also ==
- List of government schools in New South Wales (D-F)
- Education in Australia
