= Anba Suriel =

Coptic Orthodox bishop (b. 1963)

His Grace Bishop Suriel
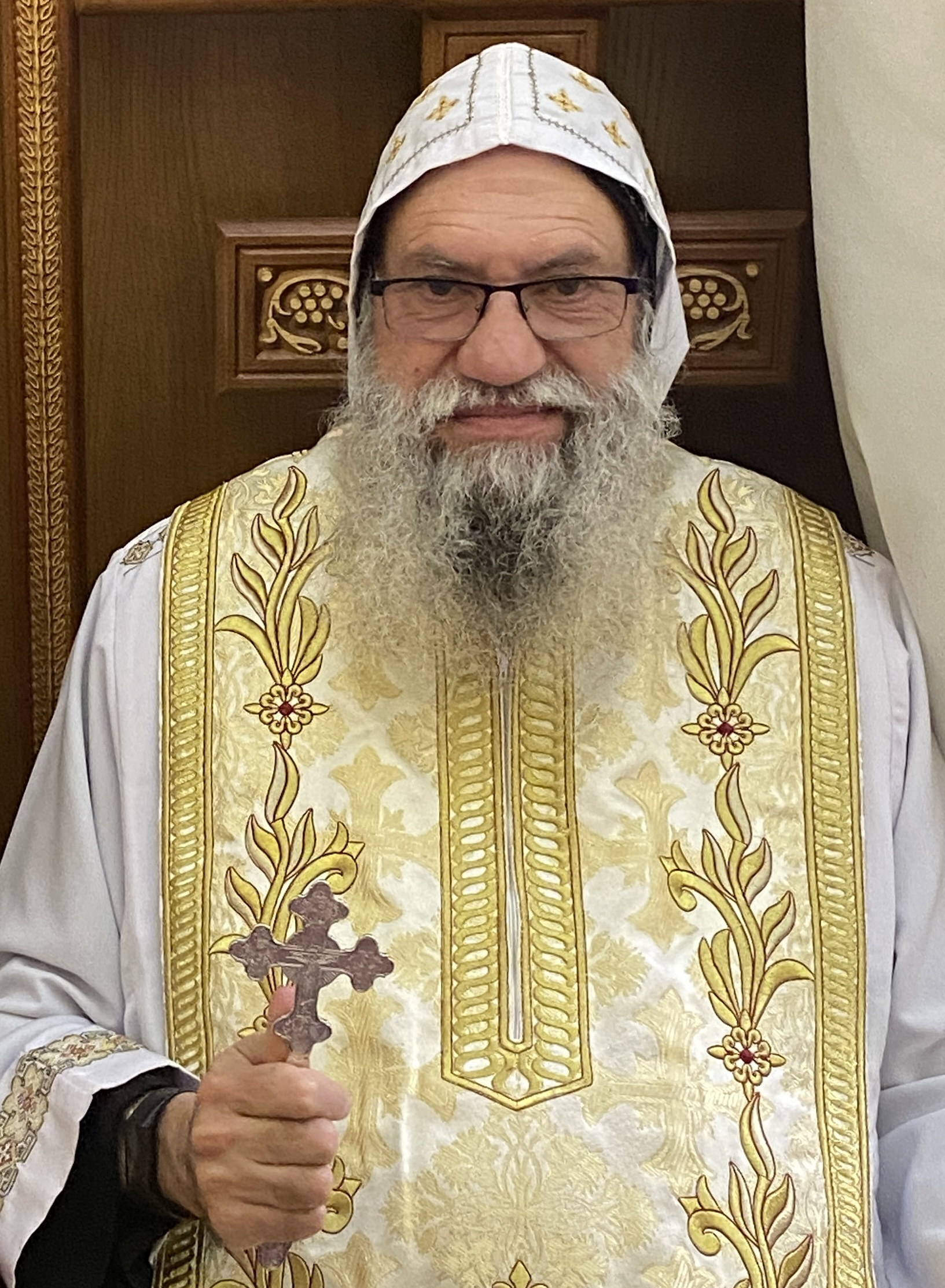
- H.G. Bishop Suriel in 2025
- Native name: نيافة الحبر الجليل الأنبا سوريال أسقف ملبورن السابق، أستراليا
- Church: Coptic Orthodox Church
- Diocese: Coptic Orthodox Diocese of Melbourne, Victoria (Australia) (former)
- In office: 1997-present
- Previous post(s): Former diocesan bishop of the Coptic Orthodox Diocese of Melbourne, Victoria (Australia)

Orders
- Ordination: 6 July 1991 (as monk) by H.H. Pope Shenouda III of Alexandria
- Consecration: 15 June 1997 (as bishop) by H.H. Pope Shenouda III of Alexandria

Personal details
- Born: Nabil Guirgis; 9 May 1963; Port Said, Egypt
- Profession: Bishop, associate professor, dean
- Education: University of Sydney (B.S.); Sydney Institute of Education; Australian Catholic University, (MRE); Melbourne Business School (MBA); Fordham University (Ph.D.)

Anba Suriel also called Bishop Suriel (born Nabil Guirgis; 9 May 1963) is a bishop of the Coptic Orthodox Church in Los Angeles, United States. He previously led the Diocese of Melbourne and affiliated regions in Australia from 1999 to 2018, and first served as a bishop in New Jersey, United States, in the Archdiocese of North America.

== Early years and background ==
H.G. Bishop Suriel was born as Nabil Guirgis (نبيل جرجس) in Port Said, Egypt on 9 May 1963. In 1967, when he was three, his family migrated to Sydney, Australia where they were founding members of St. Mary and St. Mina, the first Coptic Orthodox church in Australia. He was educated at Marrickville West Public School, Tempe High School, the University of Sydney where he was awarded a Bachelor of Science, and the Sydney Institute of Education where he achieved a Diploma of Education. He taught mathematics at Fairvale and Dulwich high schools.

== Beginning of vocation ==
On a pilgrimage to Egypt and the Levant in 1985, then 22 year-old Nabil Guirgis met Pope Shenouda III of Alexandria. Upon returning to Australia, he began leading youth meetings and conventions in the church and translated one of the Pope's books into English, "The Life of Repentance and Purity". In 1990, Guirgis was the youth representative on the NSW Board of Deacons and the following year at the 7th Assembly of the World Council of Churches in Canberra, he once again met the Pope. At this audience Guirgis stated his desire for a religious life, and the Pope invited him to the Monastery of Saint Pishoy, Egypt, where he was consecrated a monk on 6 July 1991, assuming the name of Father Suriel el-Anba Bishoy.

== Priest and bishop ==
On 8 June 1993, then-Father Suriel was ordained a priest and continued to serve in the monastery before moving to the fledgling St Mark Coptic Orthodox Church in Honolulu, Hawaii, in 1996. There he lived with and studied with the local Roman Catholic community. On 15 June 1997 he was ordained a bishop, keeping his monastic name, and later that year moved to administer the Coptic Archdiocese of North America based in New Jersey where his ministry included touring to connect with churches and further establishing the charity BLESS USA. In 1998, he completed another year of study towards his master's of Christian Education at Saint Vladimir's Orthodox Theological Seminary.

== Melbourne ==
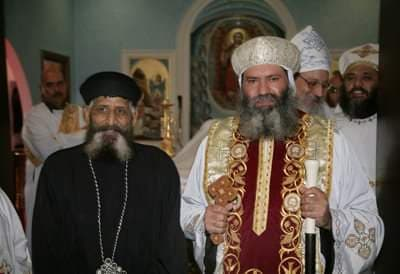
His Grace Bishop Suriel as Bishop of the Coptic Orthodox Diocese of Melbourne, Australia, February 2008.

On 10 November 1999, H.G. Bishop Suriel was appointed the first Bishop of Melbourne, Canberra, Tasmania, South Australia, Western Australia and New Zealand, and was enthroned in his diocese on 4 December 1999. After being appointed to Melbourne he completed his master's degree in religious education at the Australian Catholic University and received his doctorate from Fordham University on 20 March 2014. His doctoral dissertation was titled "Habib Girgis, Coptic Orthodox educator and a light in the darkness" which was reworked into a book published in 2017. He became associate professor and dean at St. Athanasius College, a constituent college of the University of Divinity where he lectured in religious education, youth ministry, comparative religions, homiletics and pastoral theology.

Under his leadership the church established a new Coptic centre and the theological college in Coburg in 2000 and, having outgrown it in two years, moved to the former Carmelite friary at Whitefriars Park in Donvale. In 2015 the church built a new CBD apartment tower and religious complex. The complex includes the Coptic Orthodox Church of St. Verena and St. Bishoy and a campus of St. Athanasius College.

In 2018, a complaint to the Australian Charities and Not-for-profits Commission led to an investigation into the diocese of which H.G. Bishop Suriel was the ultimate decision-maker under the constitution. The commission concluded that there were adequate process, checks and balances in place to ensure the diocese was complying with governance and reporting obligations.

He campaigned publicly against the inclusion of inverted crosses in the branding of the Dark Mofo festival in Hobart, saying it was particularly offensive to Christians who "witnessed the living reality of persecution, and many other Christians who have lost loved ones or suffered themselves for their faith."

On 5 November 2018, H.G. Bishop Suriel formally announced via social media his resignation as the bishop of the Diocese of Melbourne and its extended regions, citing the joy of seeing the church more than double in size and the pain of "insults, death threats, gossip and back stabbings".

== Los Angeles ==
On 15 February 2019, it was announced that H.G. Bishop Suriel would begin serving in the Coptic Orthodox Diocese of Los Angeles, alongside Metropolitan Serapion, and would be permanently discharged from the Diocese of Melbourne, along with any form of pastoral care that came with it.
