= Australian Turkish Friendship Memorial =

War memorial in Melbourne, Australia

Australian Turkish Friendship Memorial (Seeds of Friendship)
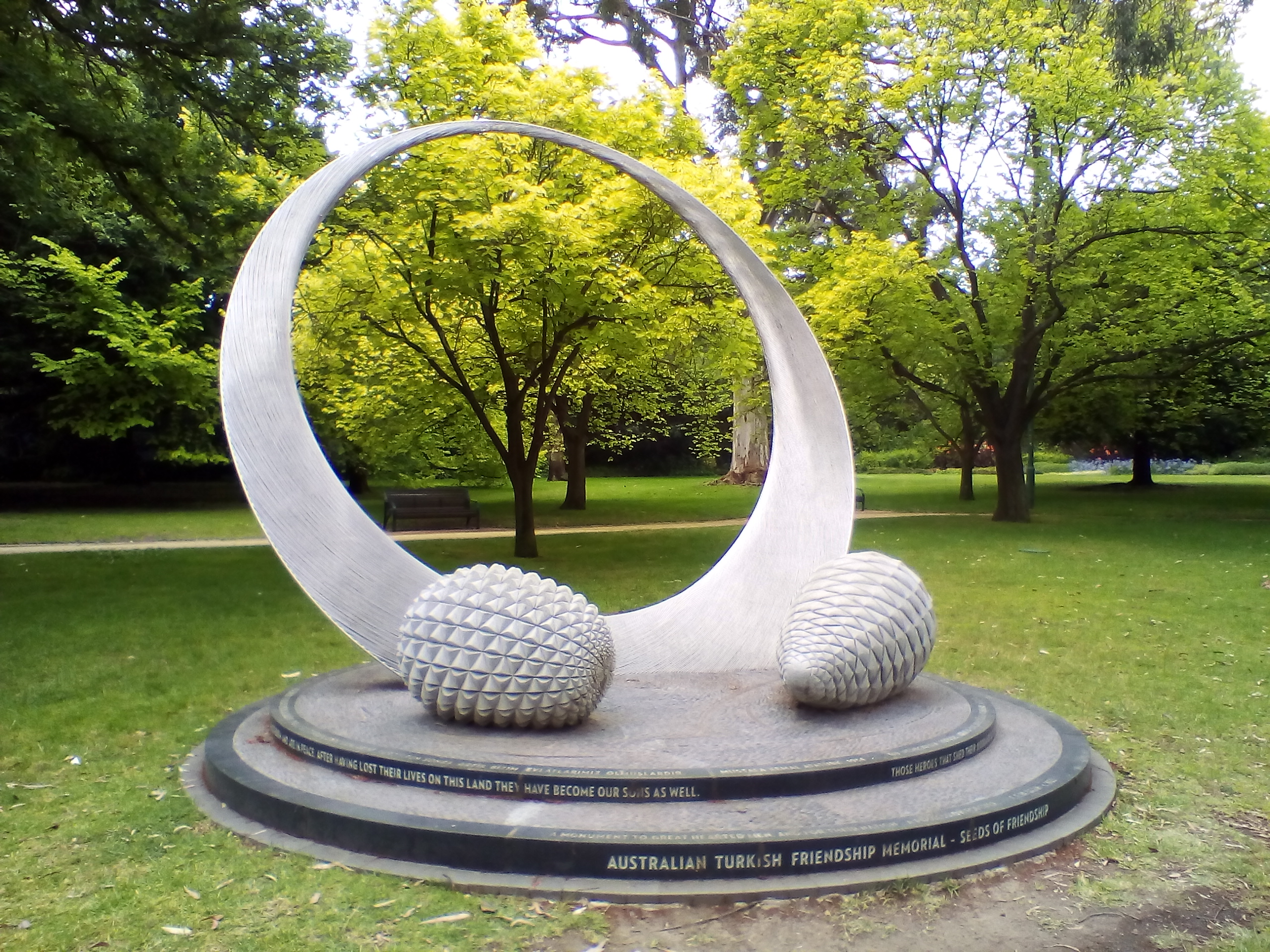
- Location: Kings Domain on Birdwood Ave, Melbourne
- Coordinates: 37.828318°S 144.973953°E
- Designer: Matthew Harding
- Material: Stainless steel, granite, copper, bluestone pebble
- Height: 3.8 m
- Website: https://atfms.org.au/

The Australian Turkish Friendship Memorial (Seeds of Friendship) is a war memorial in Melbourne, Victoria, Australia, located in Kings Domain on Birdwood Avenue. It was built to mark Anzac Day's centennial anniversary and as a tribute to Australian-Turkish relations.

The sculpture is a filigreed wreath shaped as a crescent made from interwoven marine-grade stainless steel. Its woven steel strands honours the soldiers who died in the conflict and remembrance poppies can be placed onto the filigreed structure. In front of the wreath are two seed pods based on the Australian casuarina and Turkish pinecone, hand carved from light-coloured granite and symbolising the future and friendship. The "pine needles" are copper etched and contain engraved quotes from troops and their families. The platform has a mosaic made from bluestone pebble. The monument has a height of 3.8 metres and around its base are words from Turkish President Mustafa Kemal Atatürk regarding reconciliation.

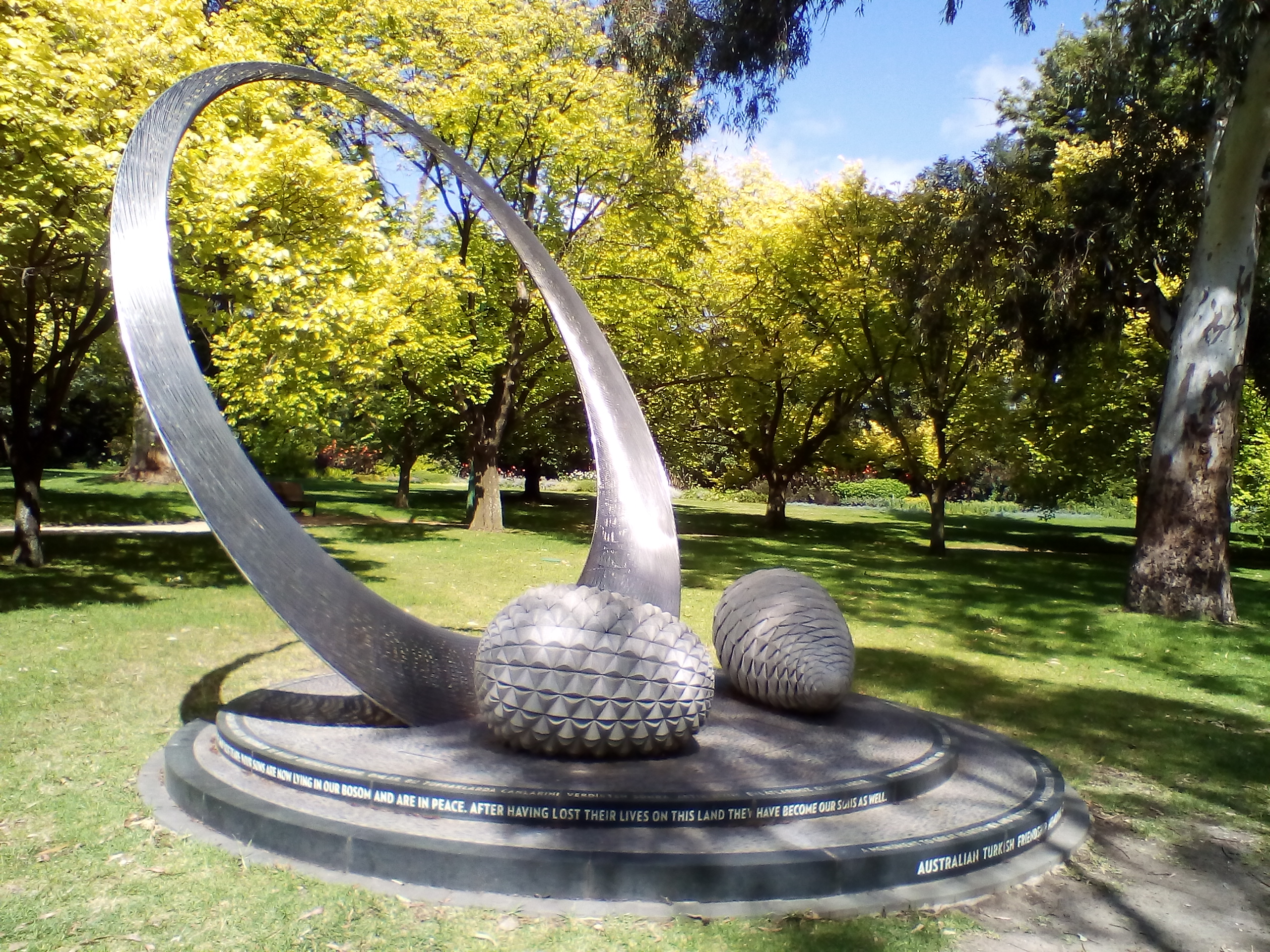
Australian Turkish Friendship Memorial (side view)

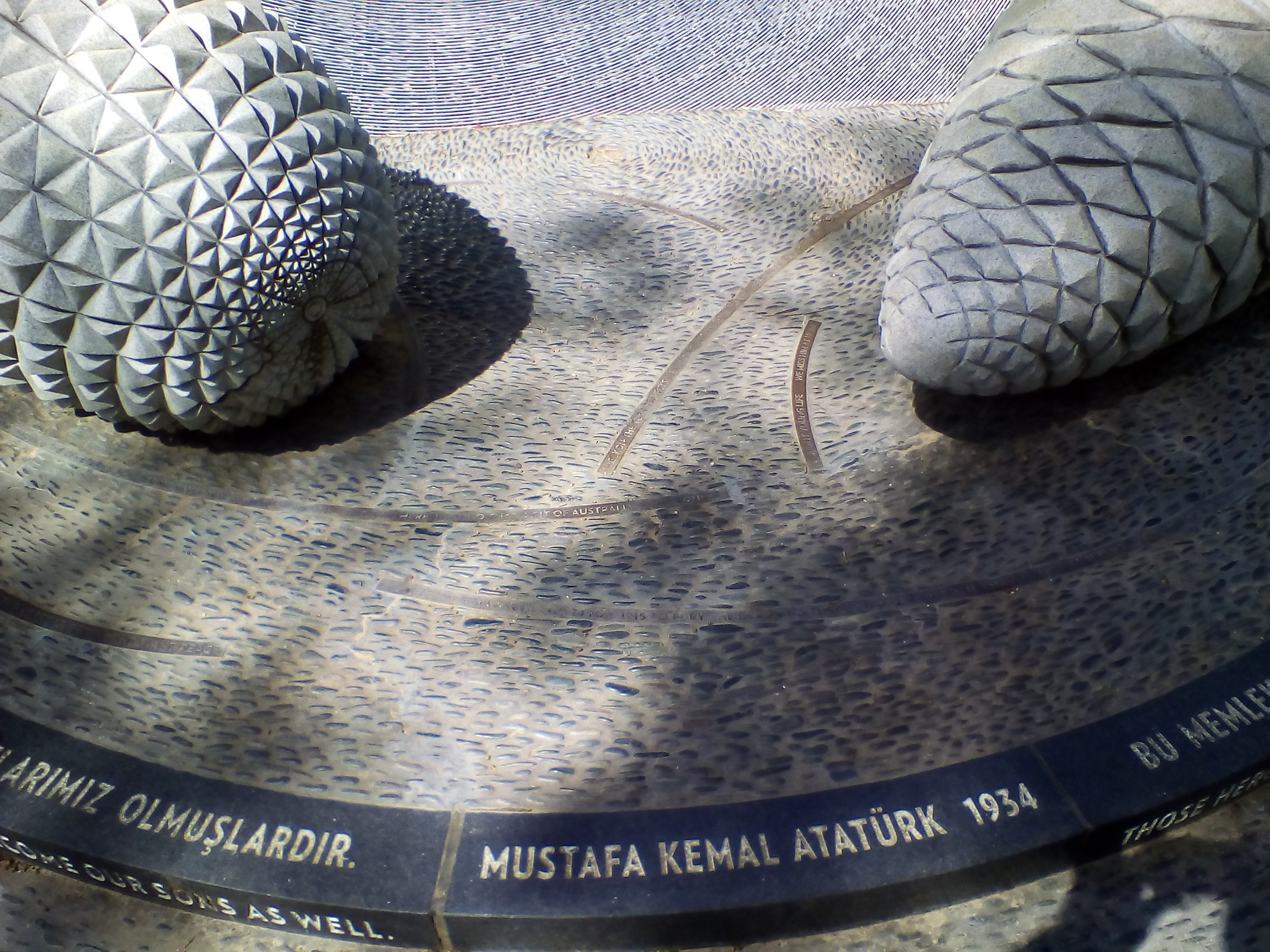
Bluestone pebble mosaic with granite seed pods

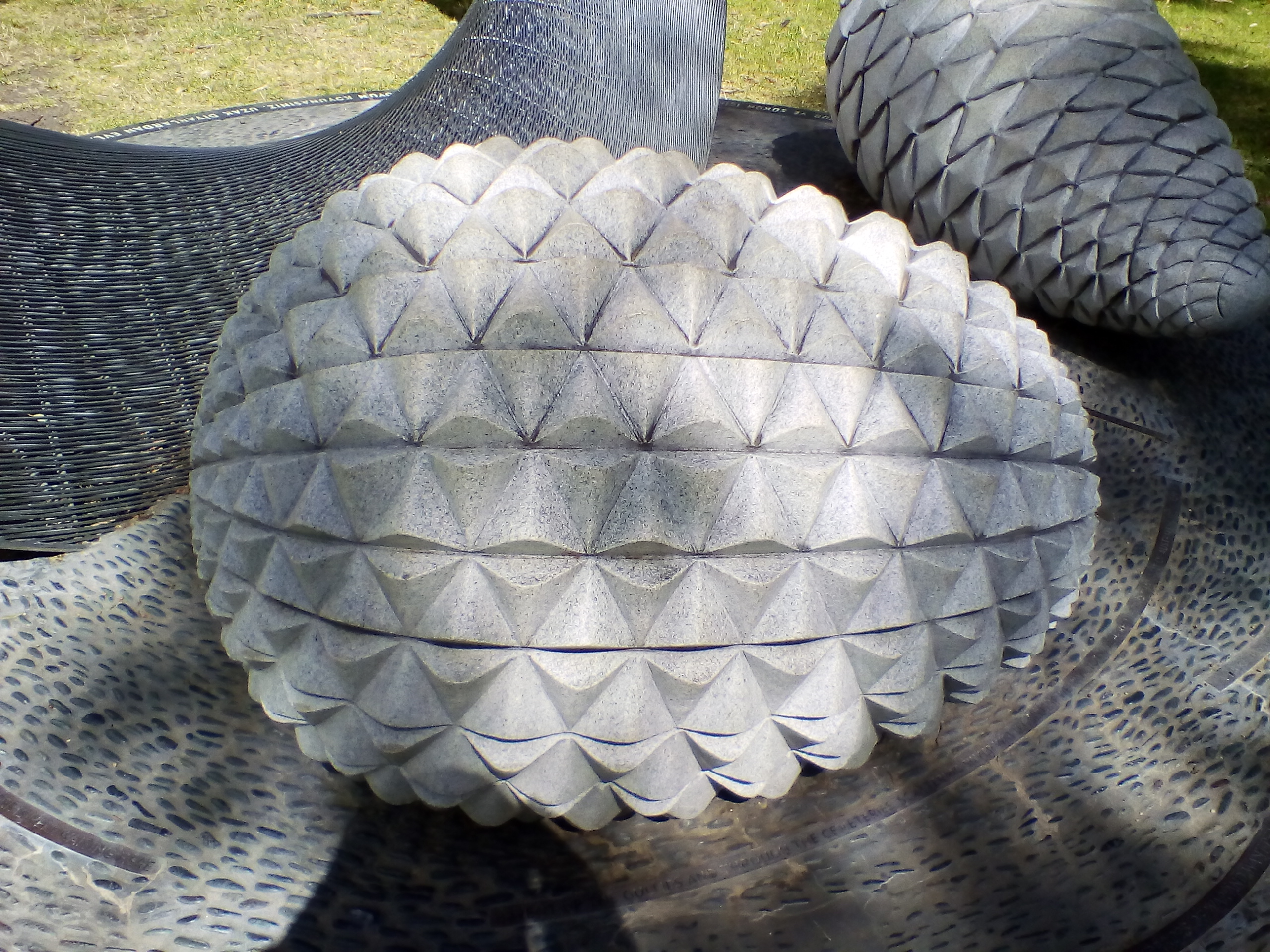
Hand carved granite Australian casuarina seed pod

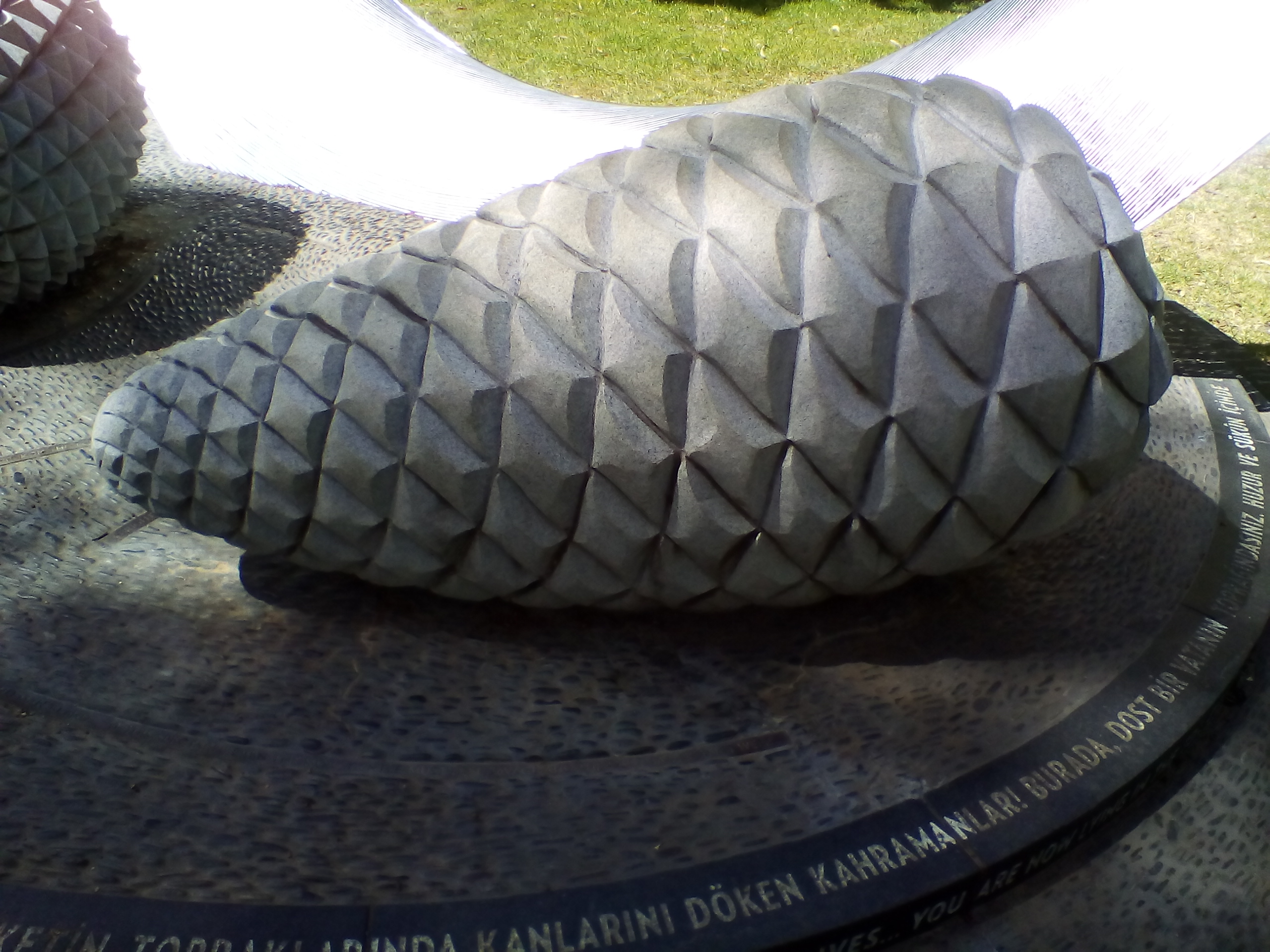
Hand carved granite Turkish pinecone seed pod

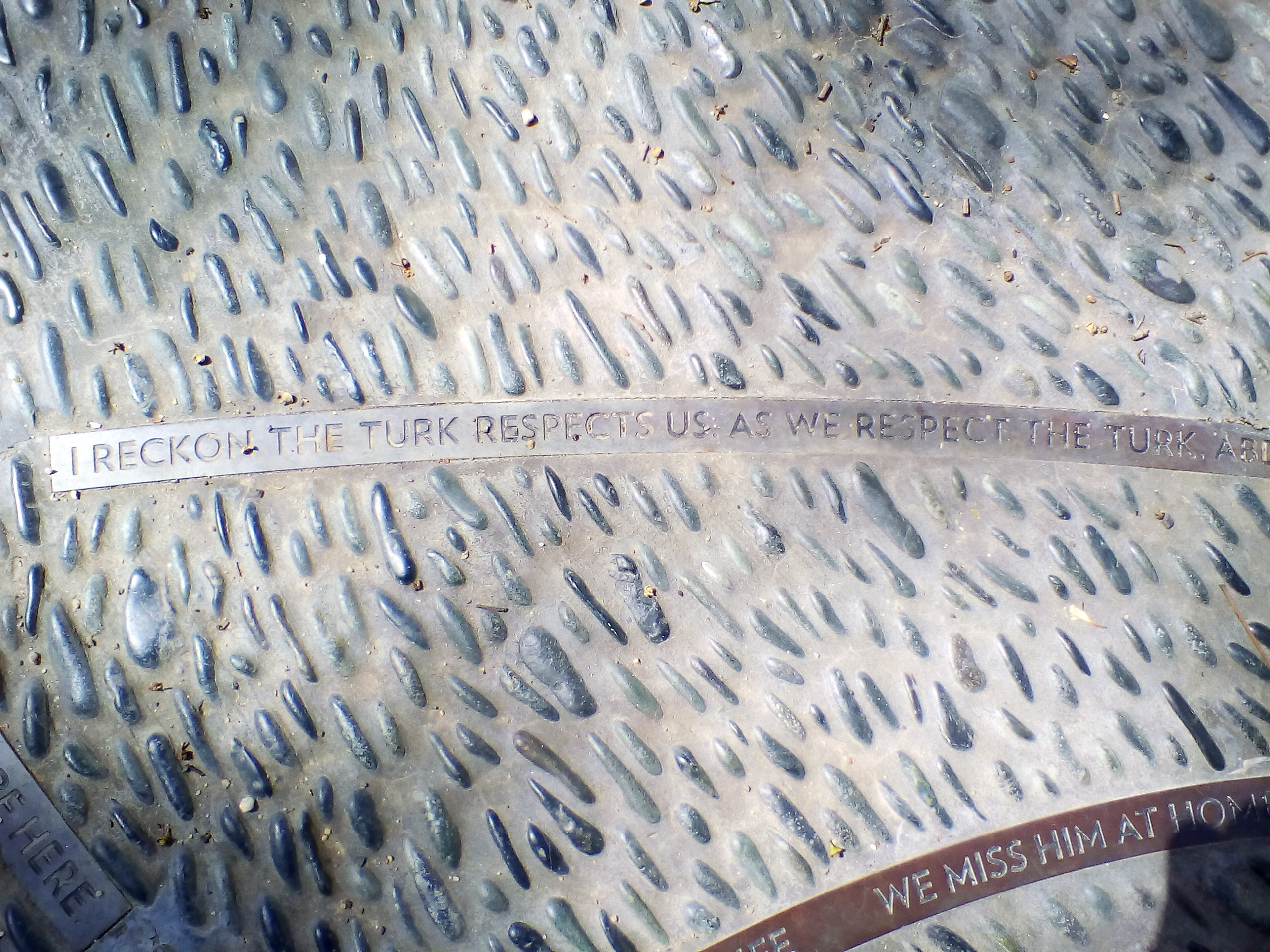
Copper etched pine needles with engraved quotes

In 2014, the monument was commissioned by the Victorian RSL's Turkish Sub-branch and Matthew Harding, a sculptor designed and was tasked with its construction. Funding for the project came from Australian state and federal sources. Harding stated that the monument represented "the most poignant and most powerful part of remembrance services – the laying to rest of the fallen and the placing of the wreath". The memorial was opened officially on 13 April 2015 for the 100th Anniversary of Anzac Day.
