= Coptic Orthodox Church in Australia =

Religious organisation in Australia

The Coptic Orthodox Church in Australia is organised into two Coptic Orthodox dioceses with over 50 parishes, three monasteries, two theological colleges and four schools. The church is a member of the National Council of Churches in Australia. According to the 2006 Census of Australia, there were a total of 19,928 followers of Coptic Orthodoxy nationally. Currently, the church has as many as 100,000 members in Australia (in Sydney alone it is estimated that there are 70,000 Copts, with numbers in Melbourne in the tens of thousands).

== Dioceses ==
- Diocese of Melbourne and Affiliated Regions formerly led by Bishop Anba Suriel from 1999-2018: Victoria, Tasmania, South Australia, Western Australia, Australian Capital Territory, New Zealand, Fiji
- Diocese of Sydney and Affiliated Regions led by Bishop Anba Daniel since 2002: New South Wales, Queensland, Northern Territory, Thailand, Singapore, Malaysia, Japan, Mainland China, Indonesia

== See also ==
- Coptic Australians
- List of Coptic Orthodox churches in Australia
- List of Coptic Orthodox popes of Alexandria
- Patriarch of Alexandria
- Pope Shenouda III of Alexandria
- Holy Synod of the Coptic Orthodox Church
- Coptic Orthodox Church in Europe
- Oriental Orthodox Churches
- Copts
- Coptic alphabet
- Coptic calendar
- Coptic art
- Coptic language
- Coptic music
- Fasting and abstinence of the Coptic Orthodox Church of Alexandria
- Coptic Orphans
- Coptic diaspora
- Coptic Americans
- Coptic Canadians
