= Saint Barbara Church in Coptic Cairo =

Coordinates: 30.0057°N 31.2311°E

St. Barbara Coptic Orthodox Church
- ϯⲉⲕⲕⲗⲏⲥⲓⲁ ⲛⲧⲉ ϯⲁⲅⲓⲁ ⲃⲁⲣⲃⲁⲣⲁ
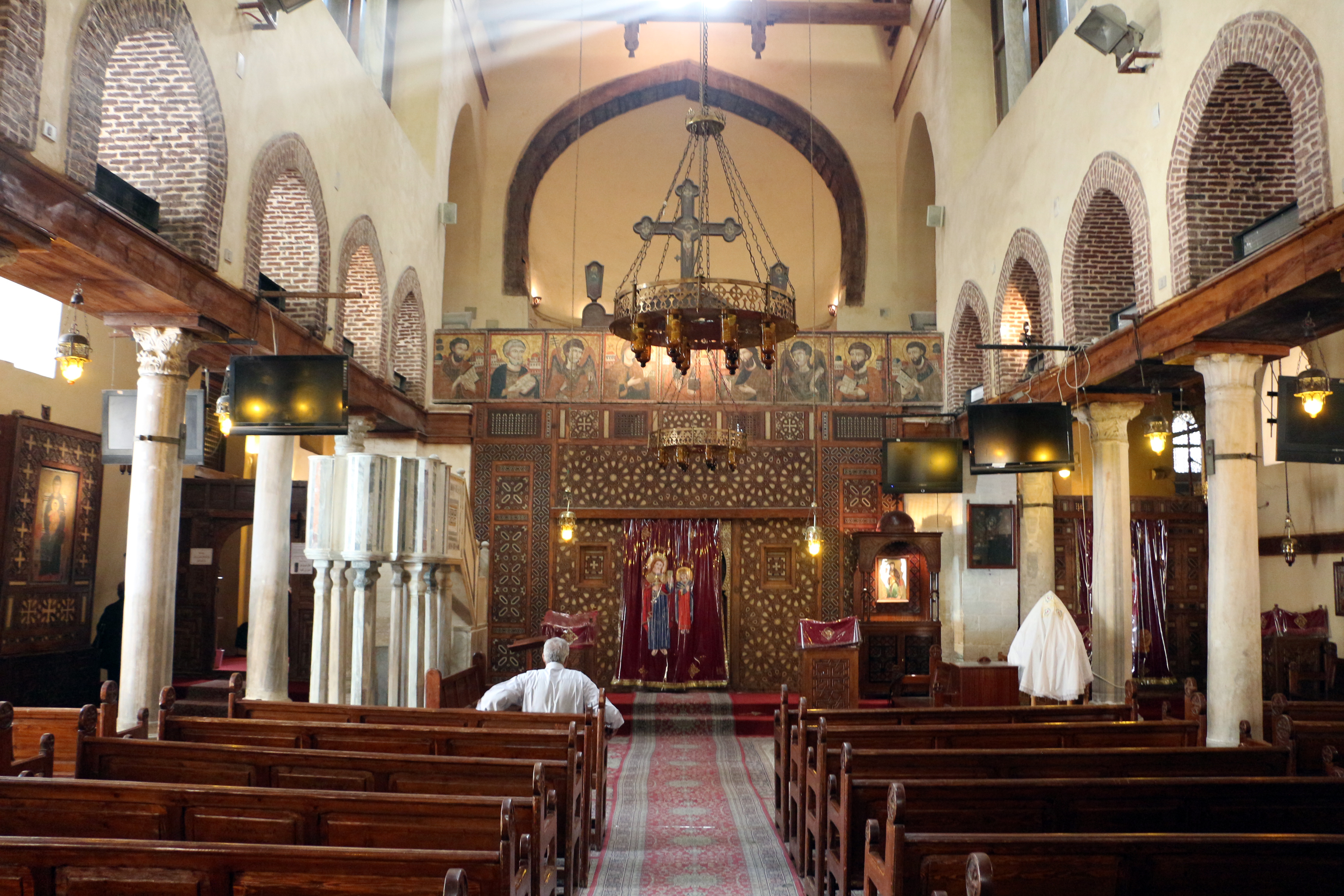
- The interior of the Coptic Orthodox Church of St. Barbara
- St. Barbara Coptic Orthodox Church
- Location: East of Babylon Fortress, Coptic Cairo
- Country: Egypt
- Denomination: Coptic Orthodox Church
- Website: www.coptic-cairo.com/oldcairo/church/barbara/barbara.html

History
- Founded: 5th century (est.)
- Dedication: Saint Cyrus & John; Saint Barbara
- Consecrated: 5th century (est.)

Architecture
- Architectural type: church
- Style: Coptic

Administration
- Division: The Coptic Orthodox Patriarchate
- Diocese: Coptic Orthodox Diocese of Old Cairo, Manial and Fum Al-Khalig

Clergy
- Bishop(s): Pope Tawadros II; Bishop Selwaniss

The Coptic Orthodox Church of St. Barbara (Coptic: ϯⲉⲕⲕⲗⲏⲥⲓⲁ ⲛⲧⲉ ϯⲁⲅⲓⲁ ⲃⲁⲣⲃⲁⲣⲁ or Sitt Barbara) (Arabic: كنيسة بربارة, romanized: Kanīsat Barbāra) is one of the many famous Coptic Orthodox parishes that can be found in the district of Coptic Cairo. The building is located on the eastern part of the Babylon Fortress and is one of the oldest buildings in Cairo, dating back to the 5th or 6th century AD. However, like many other buildings of Coptic architecture, it was rebuilt several times, most notably by the end of the 11th century.

== History ==
St. Barbara's Church stands north of the Coptic Museum and is east of the Church of Saints Sergius and Bacchus (Abu Serga), on the eastern side of Fort Babylon. It was originally dedicated to Abu Kir and Yohanna (or Ss. Cyrus and John). When the remains of St. Barbara were brought here, a separate sanctuary was built. Thus, there are now two separate churches that were built on this location. Athanasius, a wealthy scribe and a secretary of Abdel-Aziz Ibn Marwan (governor of Egypt between 685 and 705 AD), had built the church. A door found during one of the church's many restorations could date as early as the 4th century. Between 1072 and 1073, the church was fully restored to house the relics of Saint Barbara. These relics remain to this day. The church was damaged again by another fire during the 12th century. The church was most recently renovated extensively between 1910 and 1922, when the khurus, a transverse room preceding the sanctuary, was sacrificed in order to allow more space.

== Architecture ==
The Church of St. Barbara is known for its many precious items. These items were sent to the nearby Coptic Museum, which is only a two-minute walk from the church. The basilican structure and tripartite sanctuary of the church closely resembles the one of Abu Serga.

Nearby there is a convent which comprises several buildings, including a school built by the well-known architect Ramses Wissa Wassef.

While Saint Barbara's Church has been a long-lasting example of ancient Coptic architecture, it resembles the shape of ancient basilicas. It comprises an entrance, a narthex, a long nave, several aisles and three sanctuaries.

Like most other Coptic Orthodox churches that have more than one sanctuary, the middle sanctuary is the one of main importance, dedicated to St. Barbara. After entering, from the narthex's lobby, there are five marble columns that separate the nave from the two aisles. In front of the middle sanctuary there is a semi-circular choir, which consists of 7 large steps.

The medieval ambo with 10 columns dates to around 1300 and was rebuilt in 1911.

There are several other icons on the southern aisle of the church, representing the Virgin Mary and Jesus when he was a child, Jesus entering Jerusalem and the baptism of Christ.

== See also ==
- Christian Egypt
- List of Coptic Orthodox churches in Egypt
