= Simaika =

Simaika is a given name and surname. Notable people with the name include:

- Farid Simaika (1907–1943), Egyptian diver
- Marcus Simaika (1864–1944), Egyptian Coptic leader and politician
- Simaika Mikaele (born 1978), Samoan rugby union player
