= Hanging Church =

- El Muallaqa
- ϯⲉⲕⲕⲗⲏⲥⲓⲁ ⲛ̀ⲧⲉⲑⲉⲟⲇⲟⲕⲟⲥ ϯⲁⲅⲓⲁ ⲙⲁⲣⲓⲁ ϧⲉⲛ ⲃⲁⲃⲩⲗⲟⲛ ⲛ̀ⲭⲏⲙⲓ
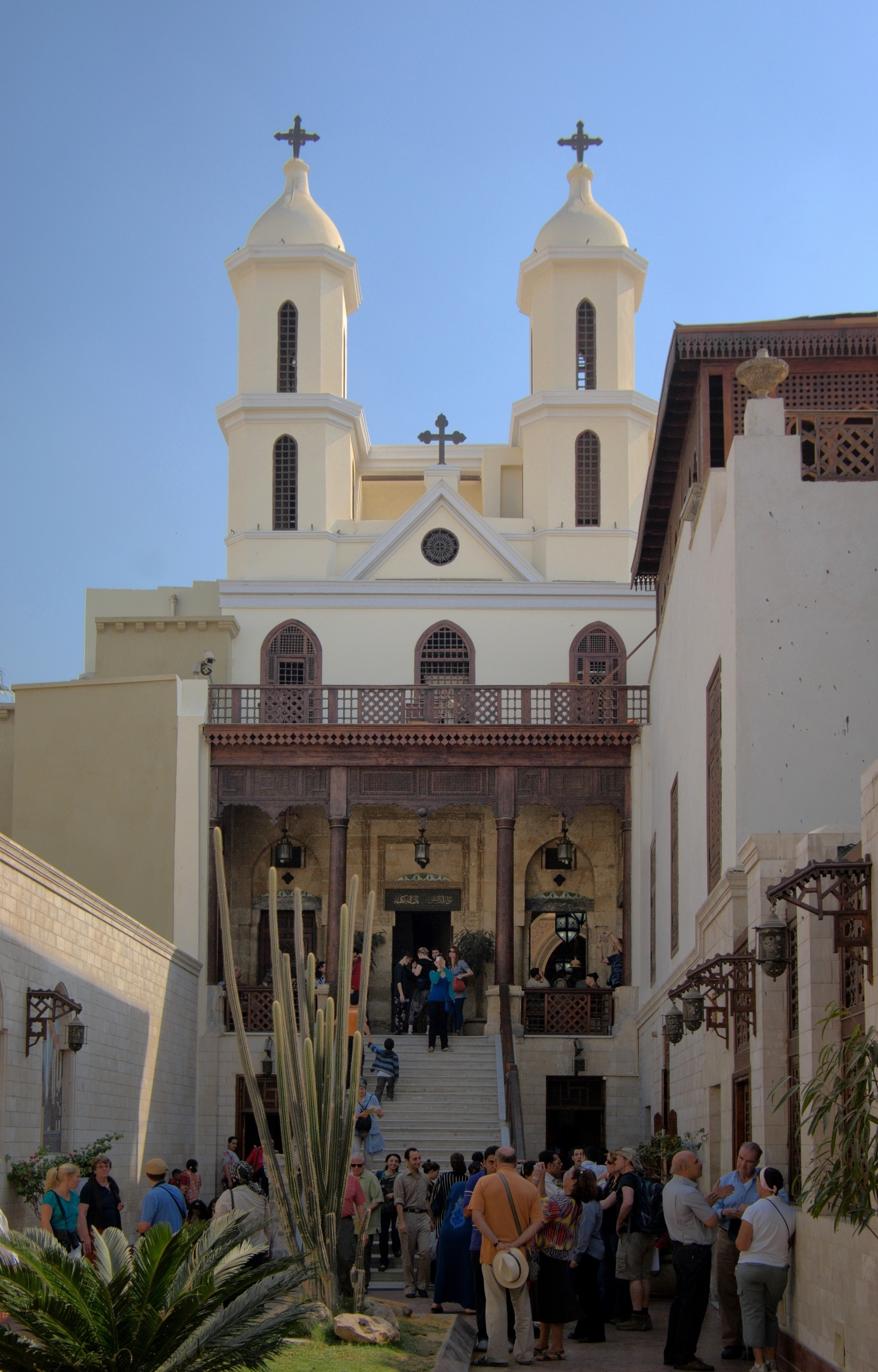

- 30.0054°N 31.2301°E
- Location: Babylon, Egypt

History
- Founded: 3rd century
- Dedication: Virgin Mary

Administration
- Diocese: Coptic Orthodox Church of Alexandria

Clergy
- Bishop(s): Pope Tawadros II; Bishop Yulius
- Priest: Fr. Jacob Soliman

Saint Virgin Mary's Coptic Orthodox Church (Coptic: ϯⲉⲕⲕⲗⲏⲥⲓⲁ̀ ⲛ̀ⲧⲉⲑⲉⲟⲇⲟⲕⲟⲥ ϯⲁ̀ⲅⲓⲁ̀ ⲙⲁⲣⲓⲁ̀ ϧⲉⲛⲃⲁⲃⲩⲗⲟⲛ ⲛ̀ⲭⲏⲙⲓ Church of Mother of God Saint Mary in Egyptian Babylon), also known as the Hanging Church (Arabic: الكنيسة المعلقة, romanized: al-Kanīsa al-Muʿallaqa, Coptic: ⲁ̀ⲛⲁⲃⲁϯ ϧⲉⲛⲡⲓⲥⲡⲉⲗⲉⲟⲛ ϧⲉⲛⲃⲁⲃⲩⲗⲱⲛ ⲛ̀ⲭⲏⲙⲓ), is one of the oldest churches in Egypt which dates to the third century. It belongs to the Coptic Orthodox Church of Alexandria.

== Name and description ==
The Hanging Church is named for its location above a gatehouse of Babylon Fortress, the Roman fortress in Coptic Cairo (Old Cairo); its nave is suspended over a passage. The church is approached by twenty-nine steps; early travelers to Cairo dubbed it "the Staircase Church". The land surface has risen by some six metres since the Roman period, so the Roman tower is mostly buried below ground, reducing the visual impact of the church's elevated position.

The entrance from the street is through iron gates under a pointed stone arch. The nineteenth-century facade with twin bell towers is then seen beyond a narrow courtyard decorated with modern art biblical designs. Up the steps and through the entrance is a further small courtyard leading to the eleventh-century outer porch.

== History ==
The Hanging Church was probably built during the patriarchate of Isaac, though an earlier church building may have elsewhere existed dating as early as the 3rd or 4th century. However, the earliest mention of the church was a statement in the biography of the patriarch Joseph I (831–849), when the governor of Egypt visited the establishment. The church was largely rebuilt by the Pope Abraham (975–978) and has seen many other restorations including an extensive repair and restoration of the church and its surroundings completed in 2011. Objects of historical interest that were no longer of service went to the Coptic Museum. A set of 10 wooden panels from a door at the church that were engraved with Christian iconography in 1300 AD can be found in the British Museum.

The Babylon Fortress was a citadel built by the Romans and its origin is disputed by Coptic historians. Some date its origin to the nineteenth century B.C, after Pharaoh Sesostris defeated the Babylonians and took the prisoners of Egypt as slaves. The prisoners rebelled, building a fortress around their home which became known as Babylon. Others believe the fortress was built in the late sixth century B.C. by Nebuchadnezzar, king of Babylon, after conquering Egypt. The Hanging Church was erected over the citadel's old south Bastions, which marked the main gate to the fortress, and gives the church its ‘hanging’ feature. Beneath the church is the old atrium entrance, with niched walls that once contained statues. Superimposed columns and brick arches were later added to provide reinforcement for the building.

The Hanging Church is among the earliest churches in Cairo, competing only with Saints Sergius and Bacchus Church, or Abu Sargah. The church was restored in the sixth century, erasing much of the evidence of the church's origin. Carved reliefs, believed to belong to the earlier structure, closely resemble those found in the first Syrian churches, which can be dated to the third or fourth century. There is also a carved beam over the entranceway which can be dated to 284 AD., the starting date for the Coptic era.

In 840 AD, governor Ali ibn Yahia the Armenian partially destroyed the church during a conflict with the patriarch Anba Yusab. It was later converted into a mosque until the tenth century, when it was reconsecrated. In the eleventh century, the Hanging church became the residence of the Coptic patriarchate, previously in Alexandria.

Pope Abraham (975-978) commissioned one of the first major restorations of the church. The church has also undergone restorations during the reigns of Caliph Haroun El Rasid, El-Aziz Bi'Allah Al Fatemi and Al-Zaher Al Eazaz Din Allah. In 1983, the chapel ceiling collapsed when an engineer had removed an interior column, damaging much of the artwork inside. The 1992 Cairo earthquake caused further damage to the walls of the structure, leading to an additional restoration in 1998 that was completed in 2011.

== Importance ==
The Hanging Church is the most famous Coptic Christian church in Cairo, as well as possibly the first built in basilican style.

The church is the site of several reported Marian apparitions. She is said to have appeared in a dream to Pope Abraham in the 970s in the story of how the Mokattam Mountain was moved by the faith of Simon the Tanner.

== Religious significance ==
The Hanging Church is dedicated to the Virgin Mary and contains sanctuaries to her and Saints John the Baptist and George. The church held many important ceremonies for the Coptic hierarchy of Cairo. These include the selection and burial of patriarchs, the former occurring from the 11th to 14th centuries while the latter only between the 11th and 12th, as well as the consecration of holy oil and judgement of heresy trials; selection of the date of Easter for every year was another important proceeding held within. These processes are held at the Hanging Church due to the movement in the 11th century of the patriarchal seat to Cairo from Alexandria.

== Seat of Coptic Pope ==
The Seat of the Coptic Orthodox Pope of Alexandria was, historically, Alexandria. However, as ruling powers moved away from Alexandria to Cairo after the Muslim conquest of Egypt during Pope Christodolos's tenure, Cairo became the fixed and official residence of the Coptic Pope at the Hanging Church in 1047.

Infighting between the Church of Saints Sergius and Bacchus and the el Muʿallaqah (the Hanging Church) broke out due to that patriarch's desire to be consecrated in the Hanging Church, a ceremony that traditionally took place at Saints Sergius and Bacchus.

== Icons and decoration ==
The Hanging Church has 110 icons, the oldest of which dates back to the 8th century, but most of them date to the 18th century. Nakhla Al-Baraty Bey gave some of them as gifts, in 1898, when he was the overseer of the church.

== Layout architectural features ==
Present structure of the church comprises the primitive church in the south and a principal church to the north, believed to be built between the third to seventh century and between the fifth to seventh century respectively.

The principal church is a basilica plan contained within a rectangular outer wall and features three apses. Its nave is surrounded by three aisles.

Its layout is double-aisled but lacks transepts. The ambon (pulpit) features 15 Islamic columns mounted on a white marble slab.

By the late 19th century, the primitive church consisted of three chapels and a baptistery and was connected to the south nave of the principal church by the first chapel. The church was periodically altered and restored in response to plundering. This reconstruction included the addition of a barrier wall during the reign of caliph al-Hakim.

== Notable features ==
Certain original components of the churches were destroyed or damaged due to neglect. Modern replacements date to the 19th century.

=== Altars ===
Of the three ancient altars typical of Coptic churches, none remained by the 19th century and were instead replaced by marble slabs.

=== Ciboria ===
The original ciboria were reported to have been present at the altars but were since replaced.

=== Mosaics and reliefs ===
Mosaics in crosses in relief are found within an ambo located north of the principal church's central nave. The primitive church contains mosaics in a hollow in the south wall.

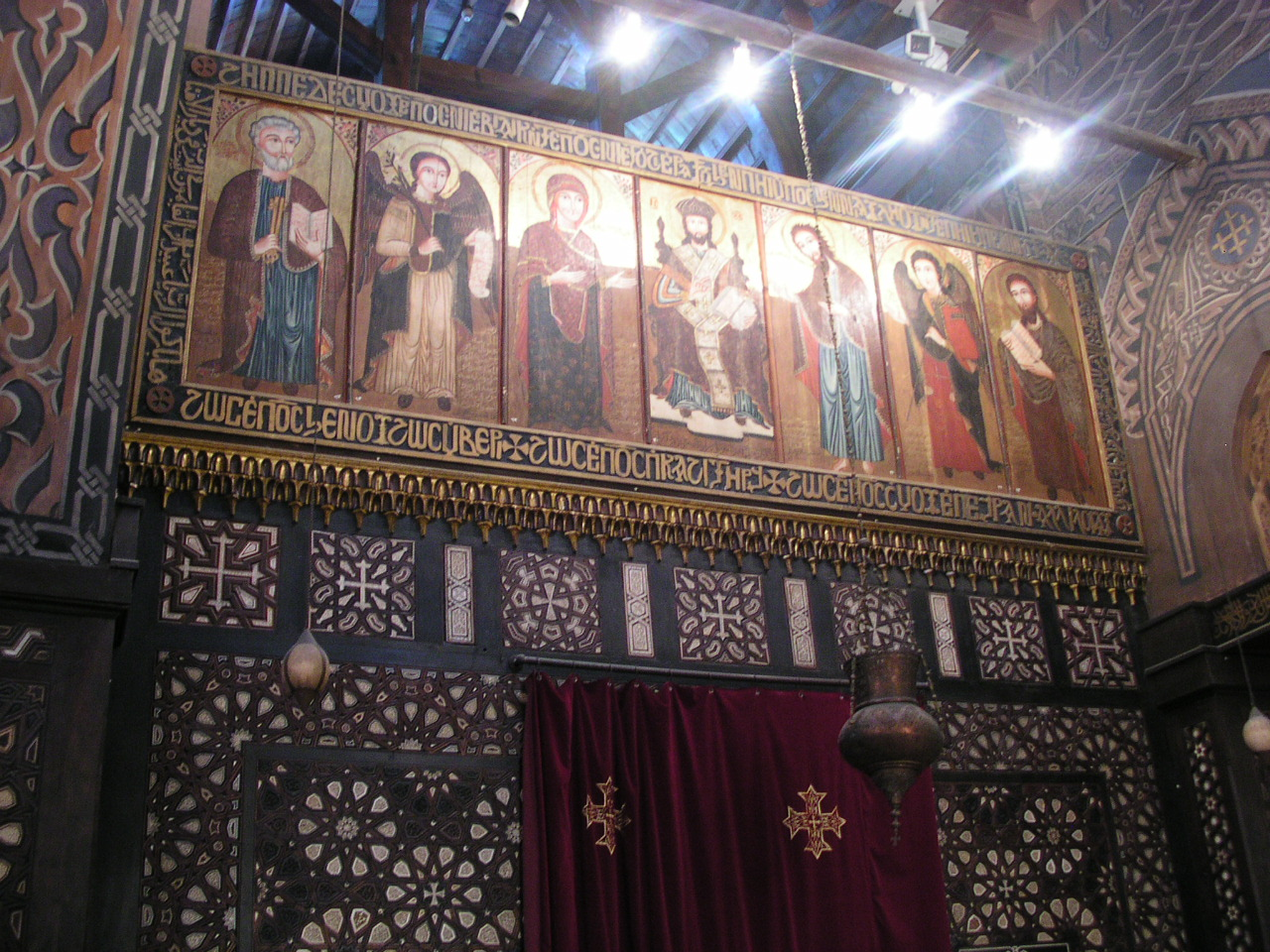
Iconostasis

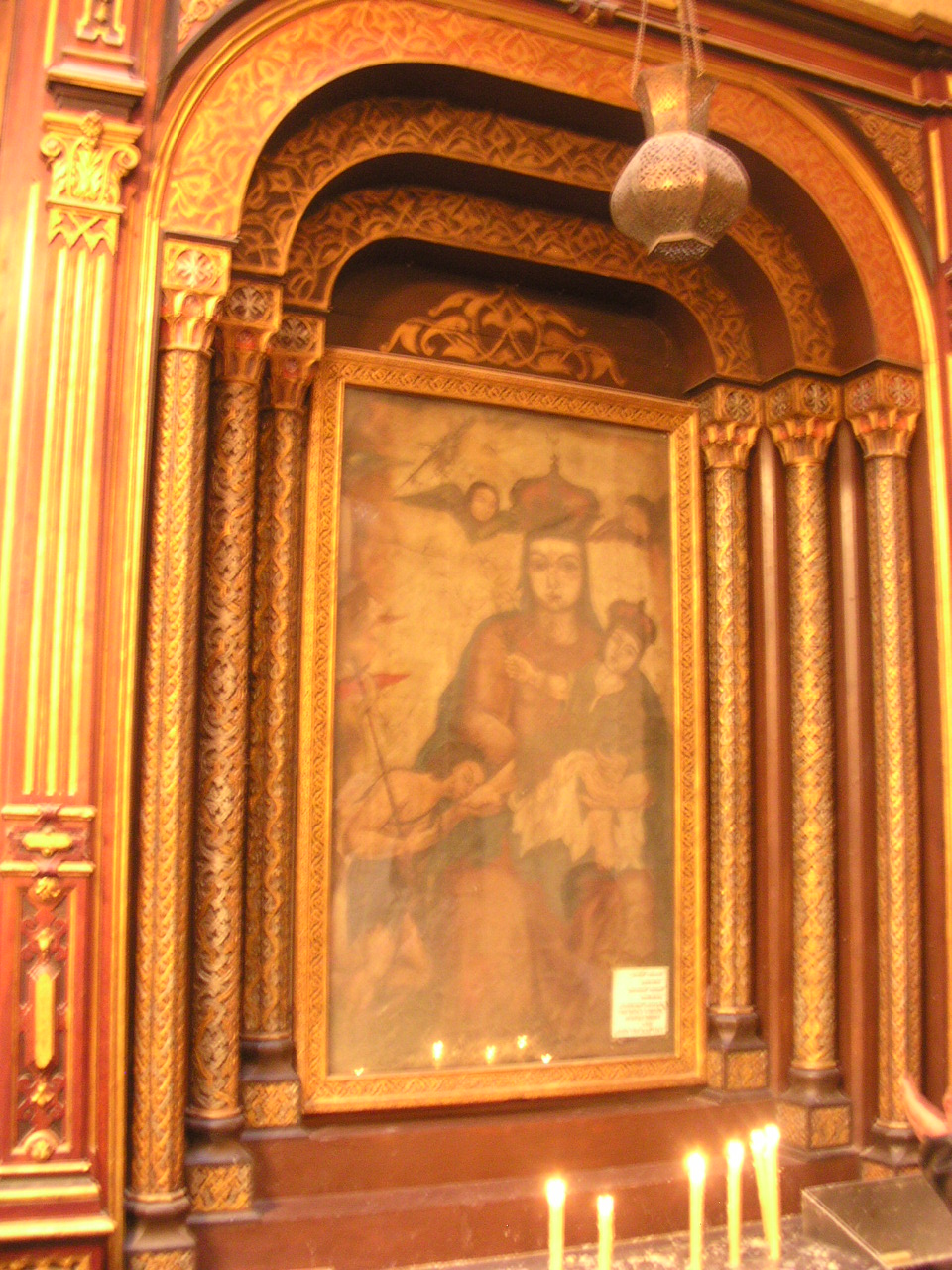
Coptic Mona Lisa

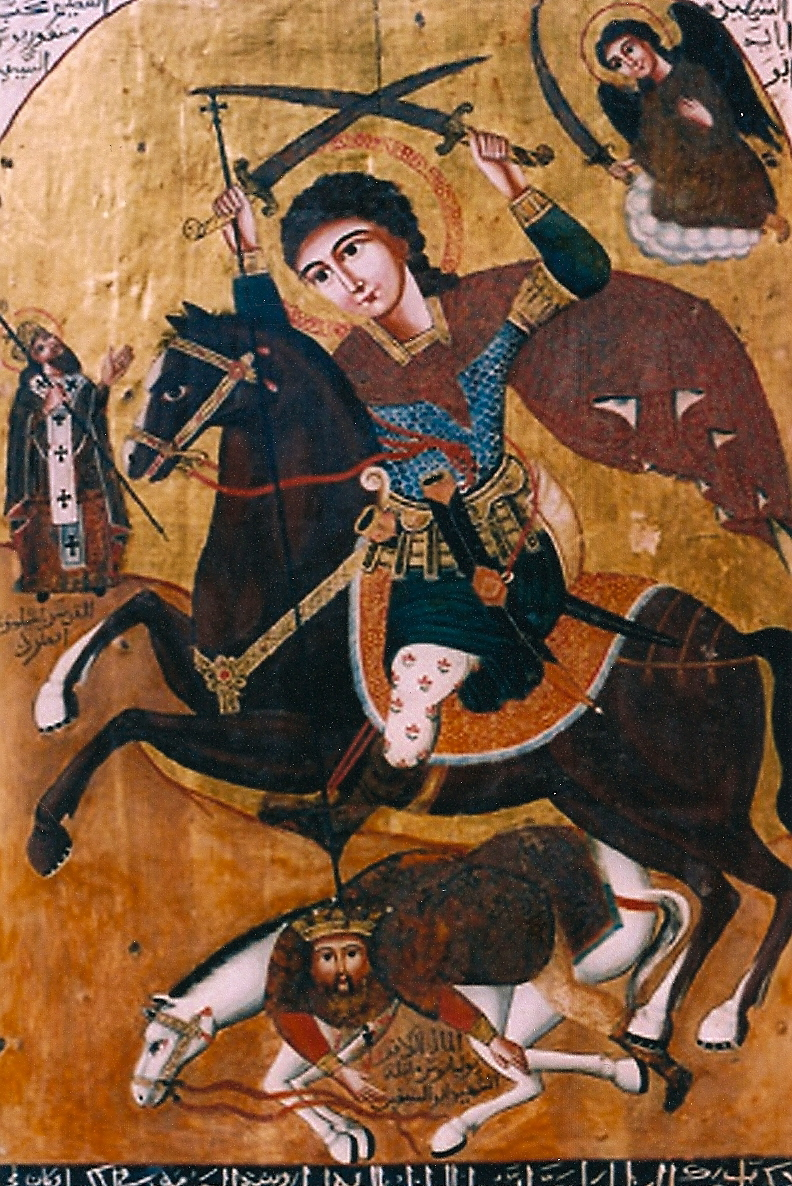
Icon of Saint Mercurius by Yuhanna al-Armani

== Facade and interior ==
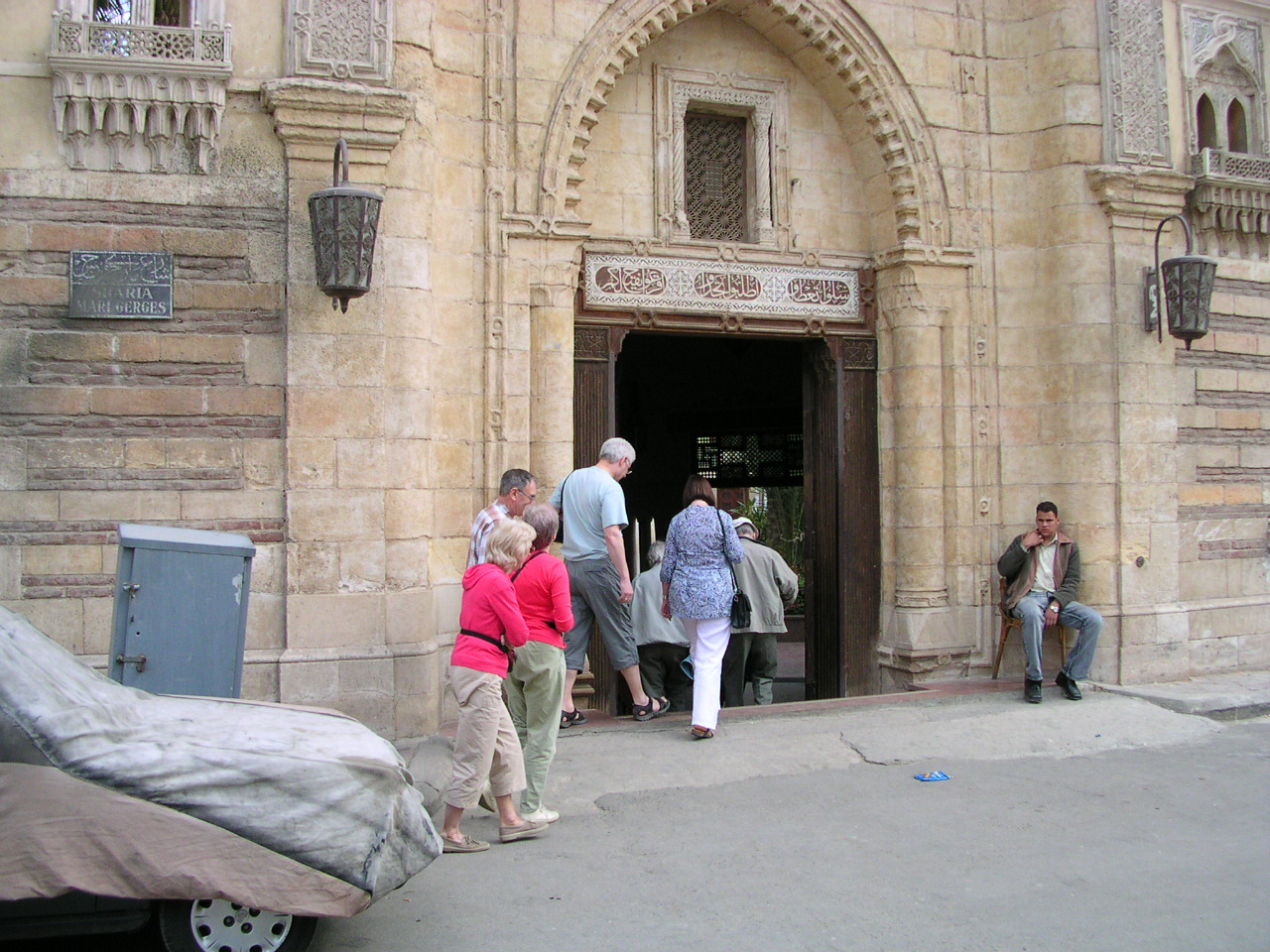
Street facade and entrance door

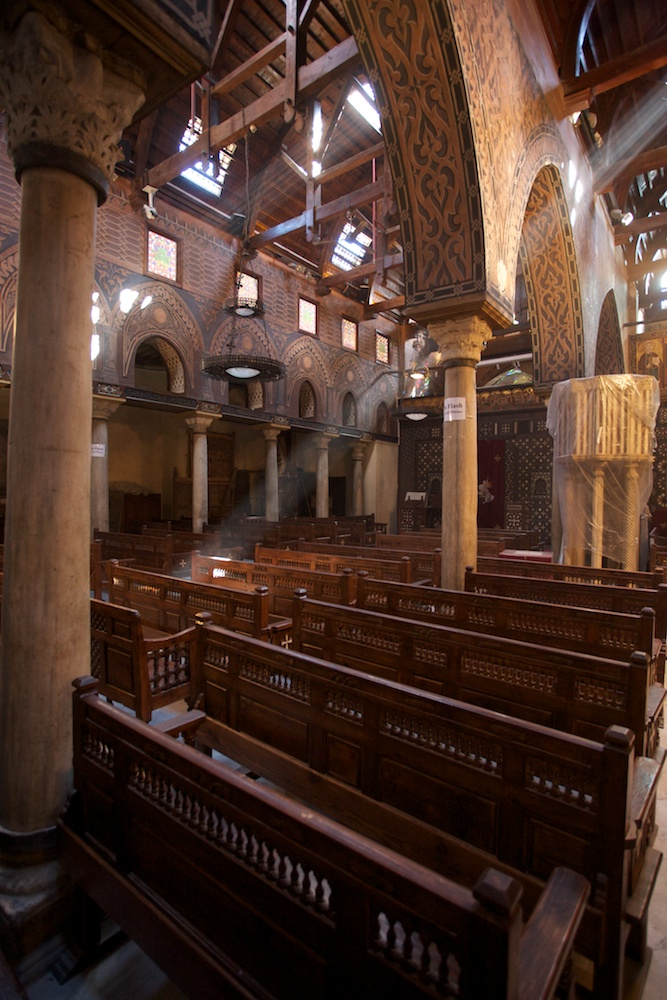
Interior of church

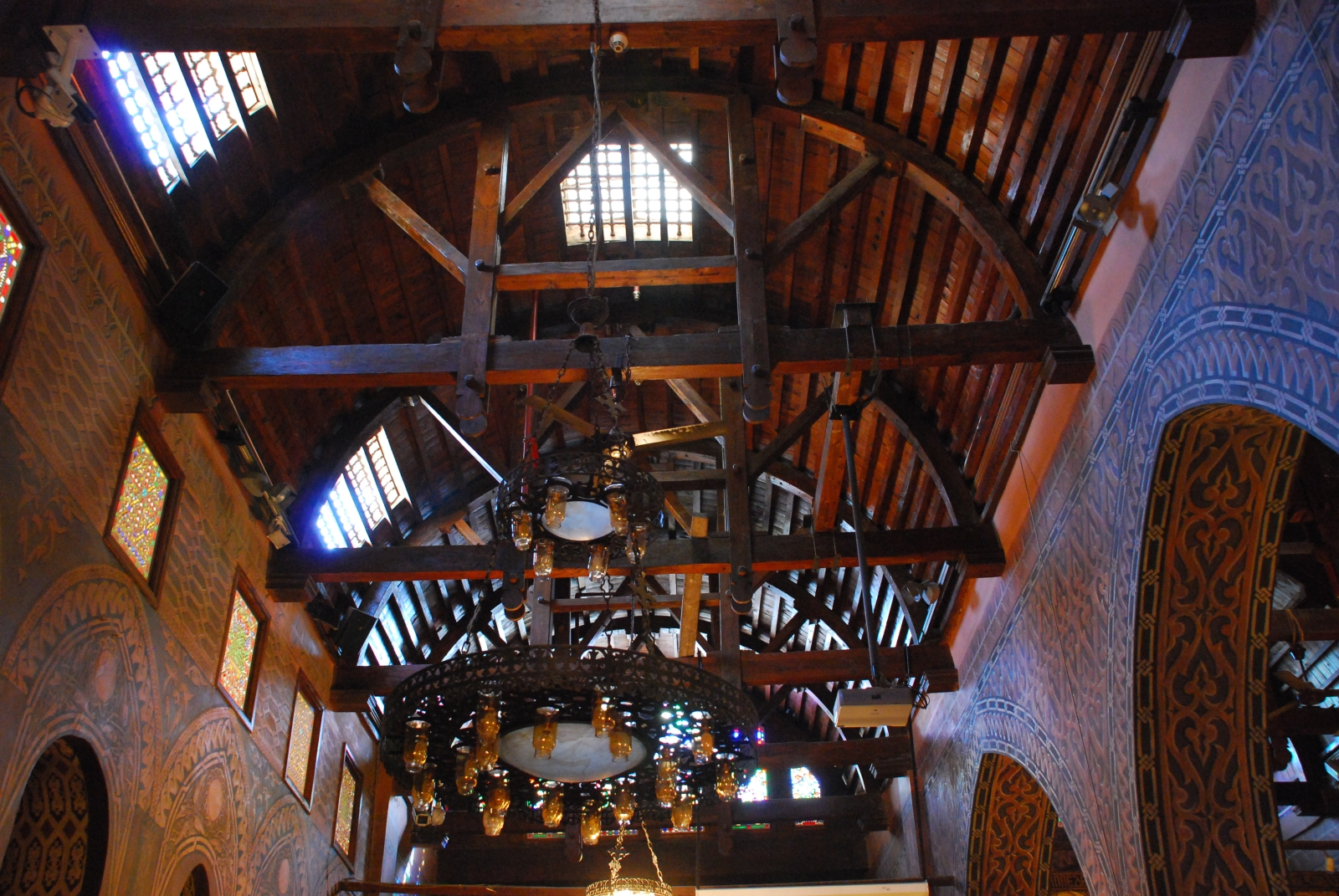
The barrel vaulted roof

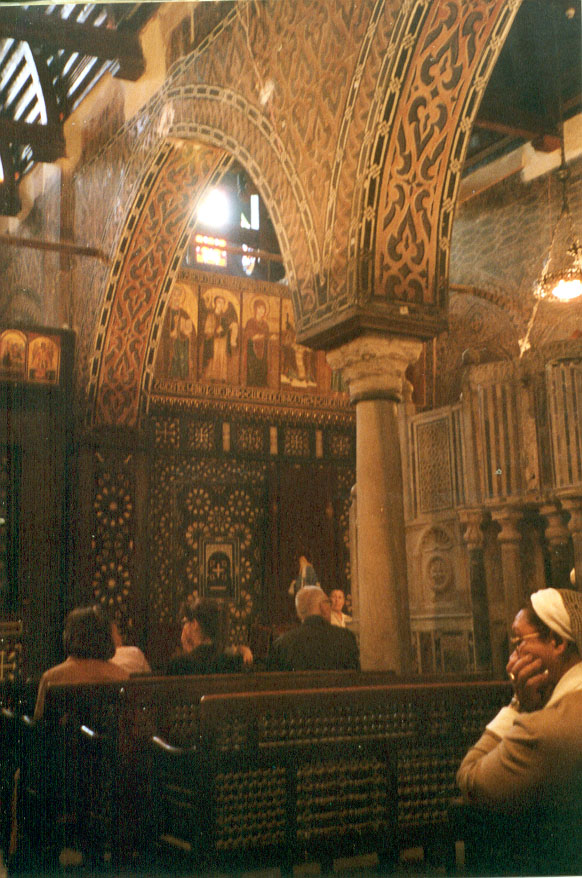
The front of the church during prayers

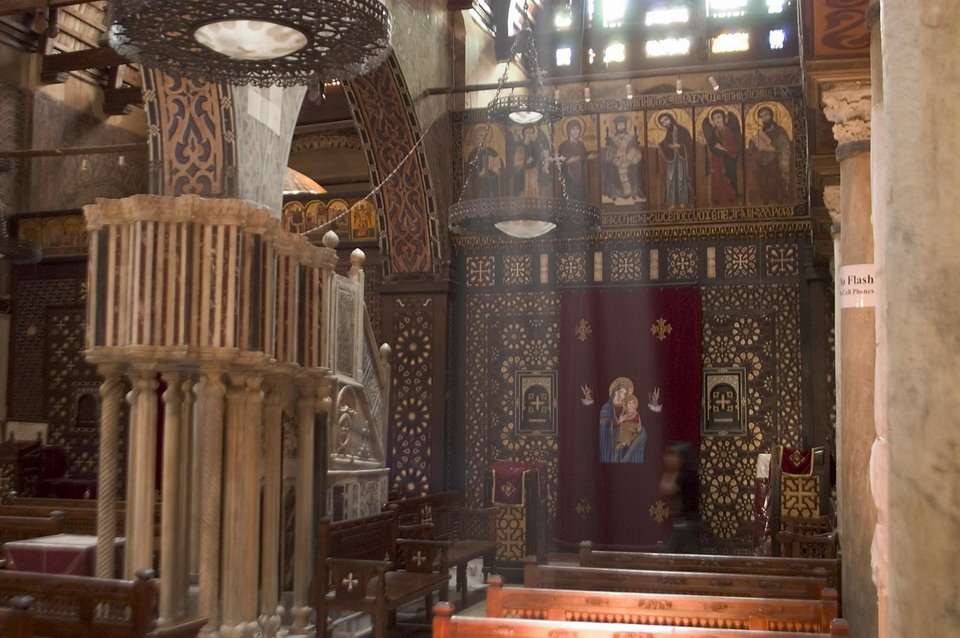
Iconostasis

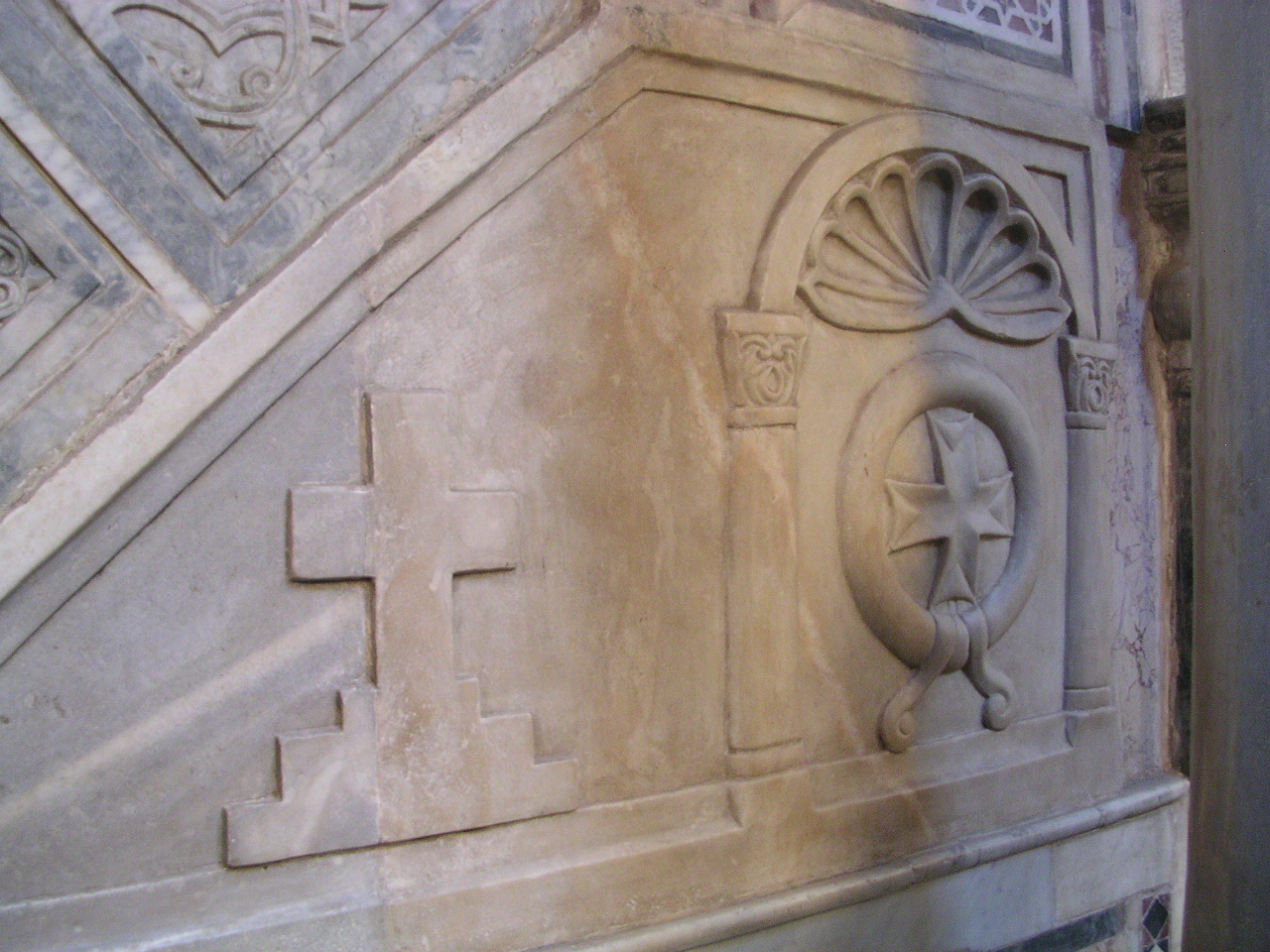
Detail of the marble pulpit

== See also ==
- Christian Egypt
- Coptic architecture — information on Coptic Orthodox Churches
- List of Coptic Orthodox churches in Egypt
