= Coptic Cairo =

Part of Old Cairo which encompasses Coptic churches and historical sites

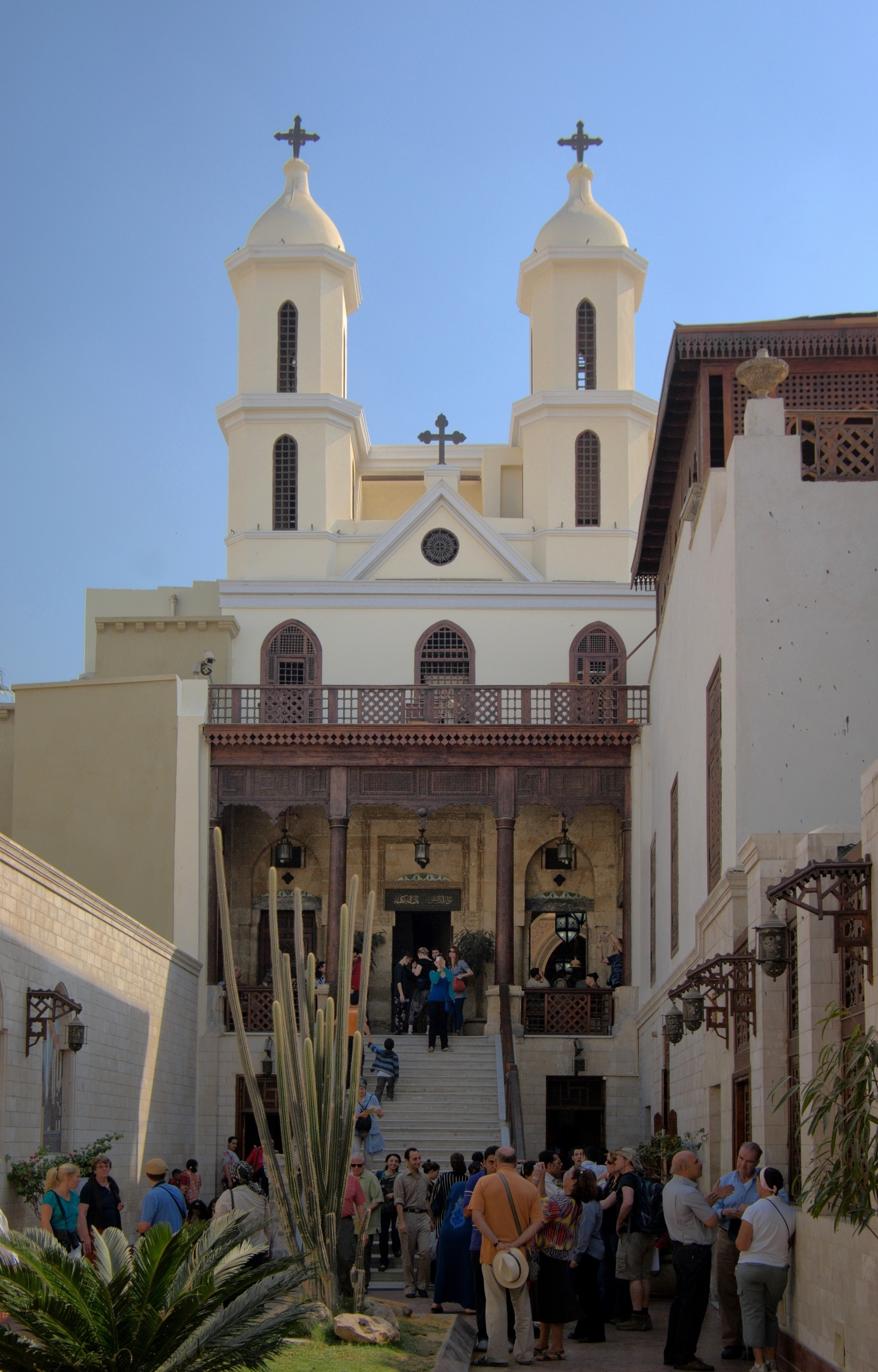
- The Hanging Church, one of the most prominent Coptic churches
- Interactive map of Coptic Cairo
- 30.00628°N 31.231781°E
- Type: Religious and historical district
- Location: Old Cairo, Cairo, Egypt

History
- Built: Ancient to Medieval periods

Site notes
- Architectural styles: Coptic, Byzantine, Islamic
- Website: coptic-cairo.com

Coptic Cairo (Arabic: القاهرة القبطية, romanized: al-Qāhira al-Qibṭiyya, lit. Coptic Cairo) is a part of Old Cairo which encompasses the Babylon Fortress, the Coptic Museum, the Hanging Church, the Greek Church of St. George and many other Coptic churches and historical sites. It is believed in Christian tradition that the Holy Family visited this area and stayed at the site of Saints Sergius and Bacchus Church (Abu Serga). Coptic Cairo was a stronghold for Christianity in Egypt both before and during the Islamic era, as most of its churches were built after the Muslim conquest of Egypt in the 7th century.

== History ==
=== Ancient and Roman periods ===
There is evidence of settlement in the area as early as the 6th century BC, when Persians built a fort on the Nile, north of Memphis. The Persians also built a canal from the Nile (at Fustat) to the Red Sea. The Persian settlement was called Babylon, reminiscent of the ancient city along the Euphrates, and it gained importance while the nearby city of Memphis declined, as did Heliopolis. During the Ptolemaic period, Babylon and its people were mostly forgotten.

=== Early Christianity and Roman persecution ===
It is traditionally held that the Holy Family visited the area during the Flight into Egypt, seeking refuge from Herod. Further, it is held that Christianity began to spread in Egypt when St. Mark arrived in Alexandria, becoming the first Patriarch, though the religion remained underground during the rule of the Romans. As the local population began to organize towards a revolt, the Romans, recognising the strategic importance of the region, took over the fort and relocated it nearby as the Babylon Fortress. Trajan reopened the canal to the Red Sea, bringing increased trade.

Over the first three centuries of the Current Era, a substantial portion of the population of Egypt converted from pagan beliefs to Christianity. They were, however, subjected to persecution by certain Roman emperors, mainly Diocletian around 300 AD. The persecutions ended following the Edict of Milan that declared religious toleration. The Coptic Church later separated from the church of the Romans and the Byzantines. During the reign of Arcadius (395–408), several churches were built in Old Cairo.

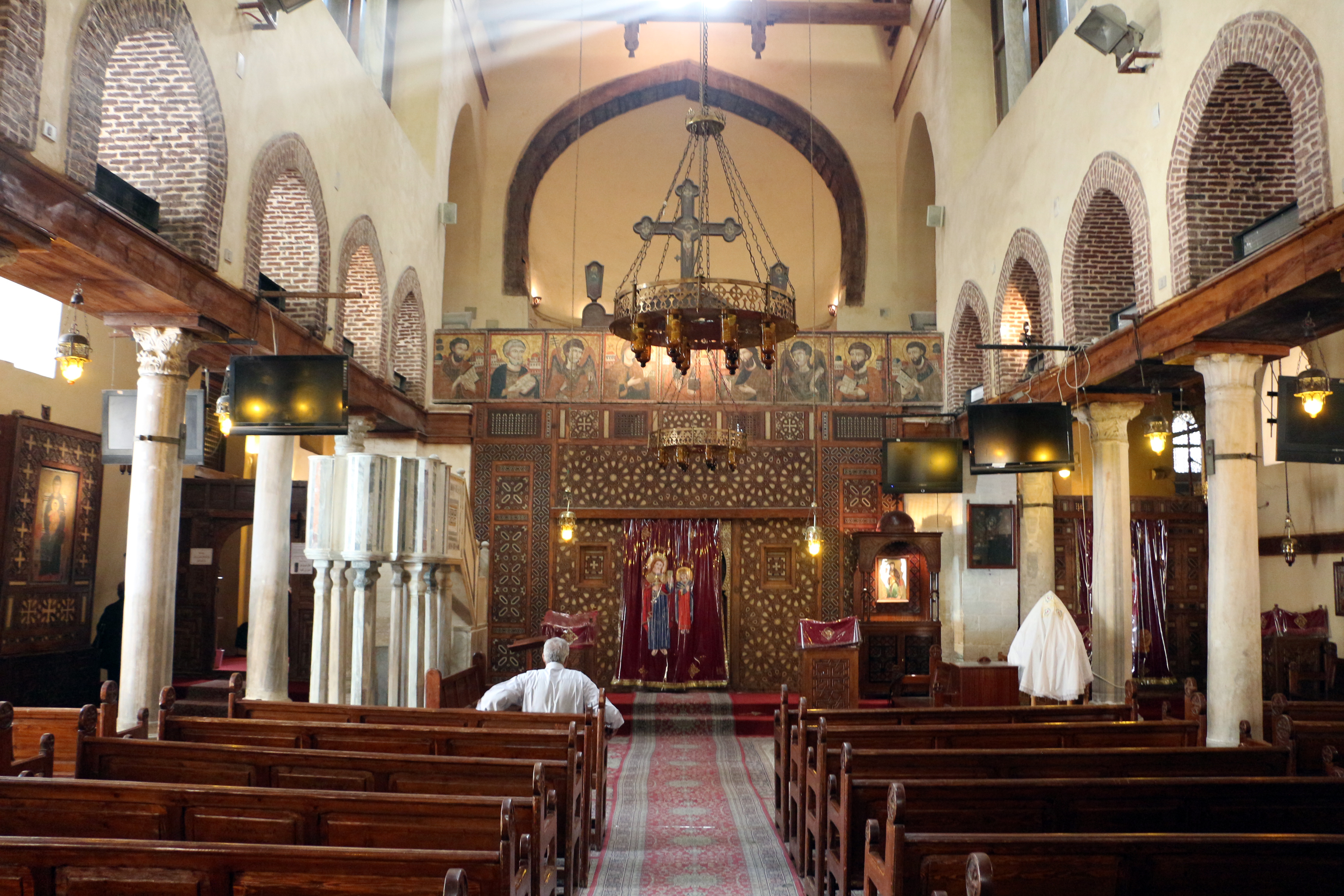
Interior of the Church of Saint Barbara, one of the oldest preserved churches in Cairo

=== Islamic conquest and early Muslim rule ===
When the Muslim Arabs conquered Egypt in the 7th century, they established a new city, Fustat, outside the walls of the Babylon Fortress. Fustat became the administrative capital of Egypt and replaced Alexandria as its most important city. In the early years of Arab rule, the Copts were allowed to build several churches within the old fortress area. Some of the oldest churches in Cairo, the Church of Saint Barbara and the Church of Saints Sergius and Bacchus are dated to around this time, from the late 7th or early 8th century.

There may also have been a Jewish presence in the area in the early period of Muslim rule. A traditional account claims that the Ben Ezra Synagogue was converted from a church sold to the Jews by the Coptic community in 882 to pay a tribute demanded by the governor of Egypt, Ahmad Ibn Tulun. This story is generally not accepted at face value by modern scholars. Documents in the Cairo Geniza provide evidence of a possible Jewish presence as early as the 6th century, though the current building is the result of a reconstruction in the 1890s.

=== Fatimid and later periods ===
In the Fatimid period, the Coptic Patriarchate was moved from Alexandria to Fustat during the patriarchate of Cyril II (1078–1092), due to the demands of the Fatimid grand vizier, Badr al-Jamali, who wished for the Coptic pope to stay close to the capital. The new seat of the Patriarchate became the Church of the Virgin, now known as the Hanging Church, and the Saint Mercurius Church (located a short distance north of the old fortress). These two churches served as the residences of the Coptic pope and as venues for the consecrations of new popes and other important religious events. In the 14th century, the seat was moved to the Church of the Virgin Mary in Harat Zuwayla, in what was then central Cairo.

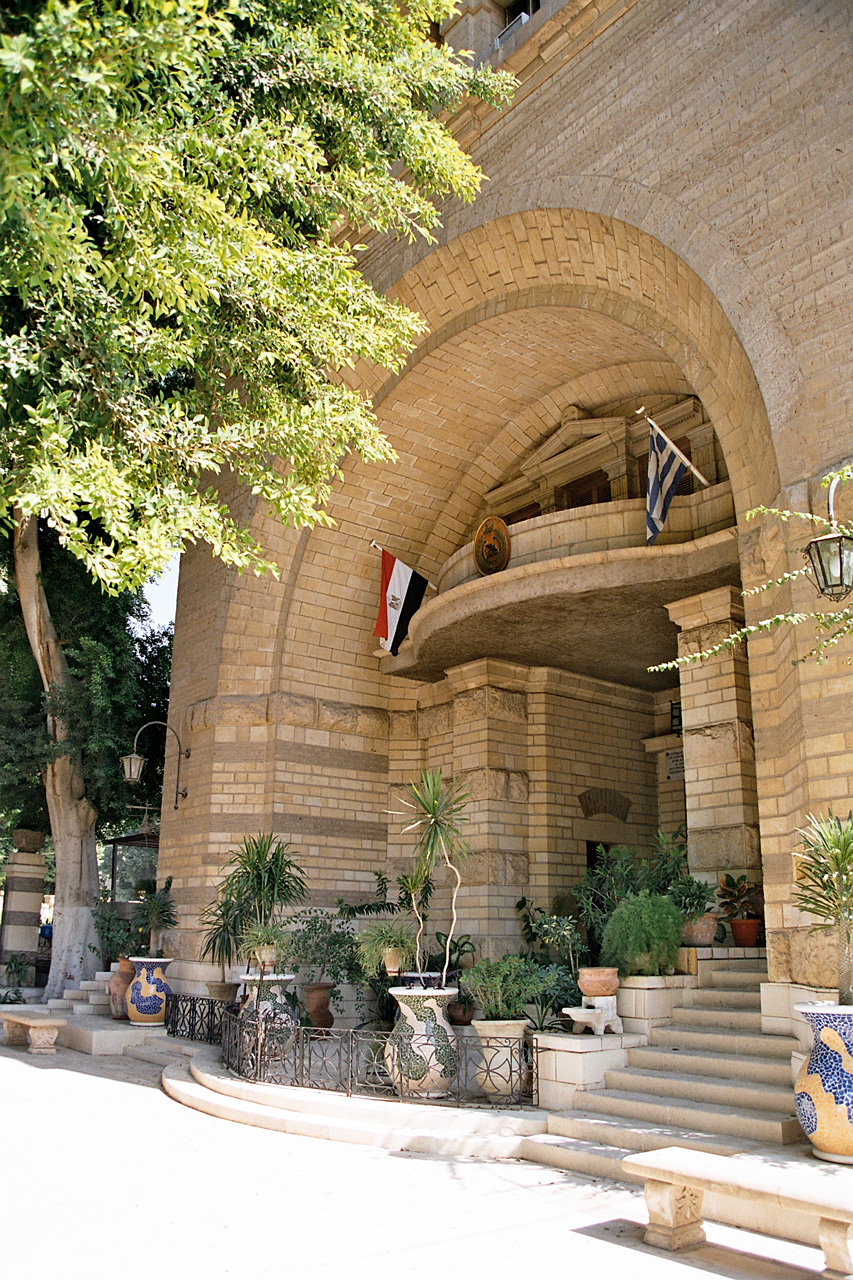
The Convent of Saint George

With the fall of the Fatimids and the rise of the Ayyubid dynasty in the 12th century, Muslim authorities became less tolerant and open-minded towards Christians and the construction of any new churches was strictly forbidden. Despite this, Coptic art and literature still flourished. A number of western European travelers also visited Old Cairo during this period and wrote descriptions of the ancient fortress and its churches. The interiors of churches were embellished with new furnishings and works of art, including the elaborate wooden altar screens seen in some of the churches here today.

During the 17th century, as the religious climate under the Ottomans became more open again, restoration and reconstruction of churches resumed on a more significant scale. In addition to the building activity, patronage of the arts grew and a large number of church icons preserved today were commissioned in the 18th and 19th centuries.

By the late 19th century, however, many churches were suffering from neglect. The situation was improved in part thanks to the Comité de Conservation des Monuments de l'Art Arabe, an agency established in 1881 to restore and conserve Cairo's historic monuments. Starting in 1897, the Comité was given a budget to safeguard Coptic monuments in particular, aided by funding from the Coptic patriarchate. Another aspect of this conservation effort was the opening of the Coptic Museum in 1910 to house and protect historic works of Coptic art, relevant artefacts from archaeological excavations, and decorative architectural elements drawn from churches and houses around the country. It now houses the world's most important collection of Coptic art.

== Churches ==
Coptic Cairo is, to this day, a predominantly Christian area, containing many historically important churches:

- Saint Mary Church (Haret Elroum)
- Saint Mercurius Church
- Saints Sergius and Bacchus Church (Abu Serga)
- The Hanging Church
- Church of the Holy Virgin (Babylon El-Darag)
- Saint Barbara Church
- The Church of Saint Menas
- Nunnery and Church of St. George
- Monastery and Church of St. George (Greek Orthodox)

== See also ==
- Copts in Egypt
- Coptic architecture
- Saint Mark's Coptic Orthodox Cathedral, Cairo
- Saint Mark's Coptic Orthodox Cathedral (Alexandria)
- Church of the Virgin Mary (Haret Zuweila)
- Holy family in Egypt
