= Coptic Museum =

Museum in Coptic Cairo, Egypt

The Coptic Museum المتحف القبطي
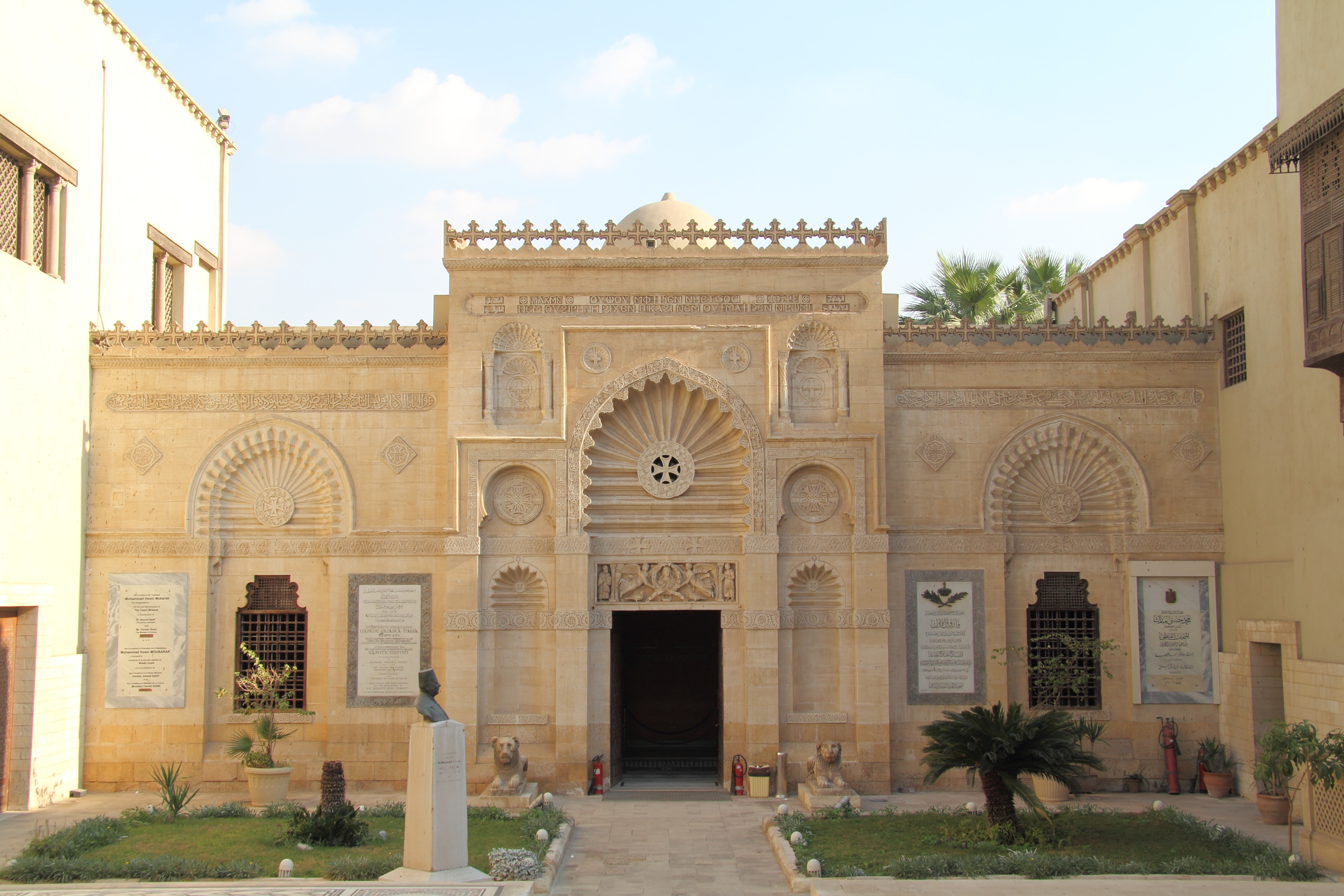
- The museum's facade
- Established: 1908; 118 years ago
- Location: Coptic Cairo, Old Cairo (Egypt)
- Coordinates: 30°00′20″N 31°13′50″E
- Type: Coptic antiquities
- Website: Official website

The Coptic Museum is a museum in Coptic Cairo, Egypt, which contains the largest collection of Coptic Christian artifacts in the world. It was founded by Marcus Simaika in 1908 to house Coptic antiquities. The museum traces the history of Egypt from its beginnings to the present day. It was erected on 8,000 square meter land offered by the Coptic Orthodox Church, under the guardianship of Pope Cyril V.

The Coptic museum houses the world's most important examples of Coptic art. The façade of the museum was made to resemble the façade of the 12th century Al-Aqmar Mosque.

== History ==
In 1908, after receiving approval and a number of silver antiquities from Pope Cyril V and raising funds by public subscription, Marcus Simaika Pasha built the Coptic Museum and inaugurated it on 14 March 1910. The Coptic community was generous in their support of the museum, donating many vestments, frescoes, and icons. In 1931 the Coptic Museum became a state museum under the jurisdiction of the Department of Antiquities, and in 1939 the collection of Christian antiquities in the Egyptian Museum was moved there. These were housed in the New Wing, completed in 1944. Because of damage, the Old Wing was closed in 1966, and the entire museum was renovated between 1983 and 1984. The foundations of the museum were strengthened and reinforced between 1986 and 1988, which helped the museum survive the 1992 earthquake. Further renovations took place in 2005–06.

Marcus Simaika Pasha was followed by Dr Togo Mina and then by Dr Pahor Labib, the first to have the title of Director of the Coptic Museum. Besides the museum buildings, there are gardens and courtyards and the area is surrounded by old Coptic churches. There are six churches, some which have origins as early as the 5th century AD. These old edifices include Saint Virgin Mary's Coptic Orthodox Church, also known as the Hanging Church, and the church of Saints Sergius and Bacchus.

The Coptic Museum's building is paved with mosaics and decorated with old mashrabiya screens. The museum houses an extensive collection of objects from the Christian era, which links the Pharaonic and Islamic periods. The artefacts on display illustrate a period of Egypt's history which is often neglected and they show how the artistic development of the Coptic culture was influenced by the pharaonic, Graeco-Roman and Islamic cultures. The museum was renovated in the early 1980 with two new annexes, which with the original aisles, houses the collection of 16,000 artefacts arranged in chronological order through twelve sections.

== Collection ==
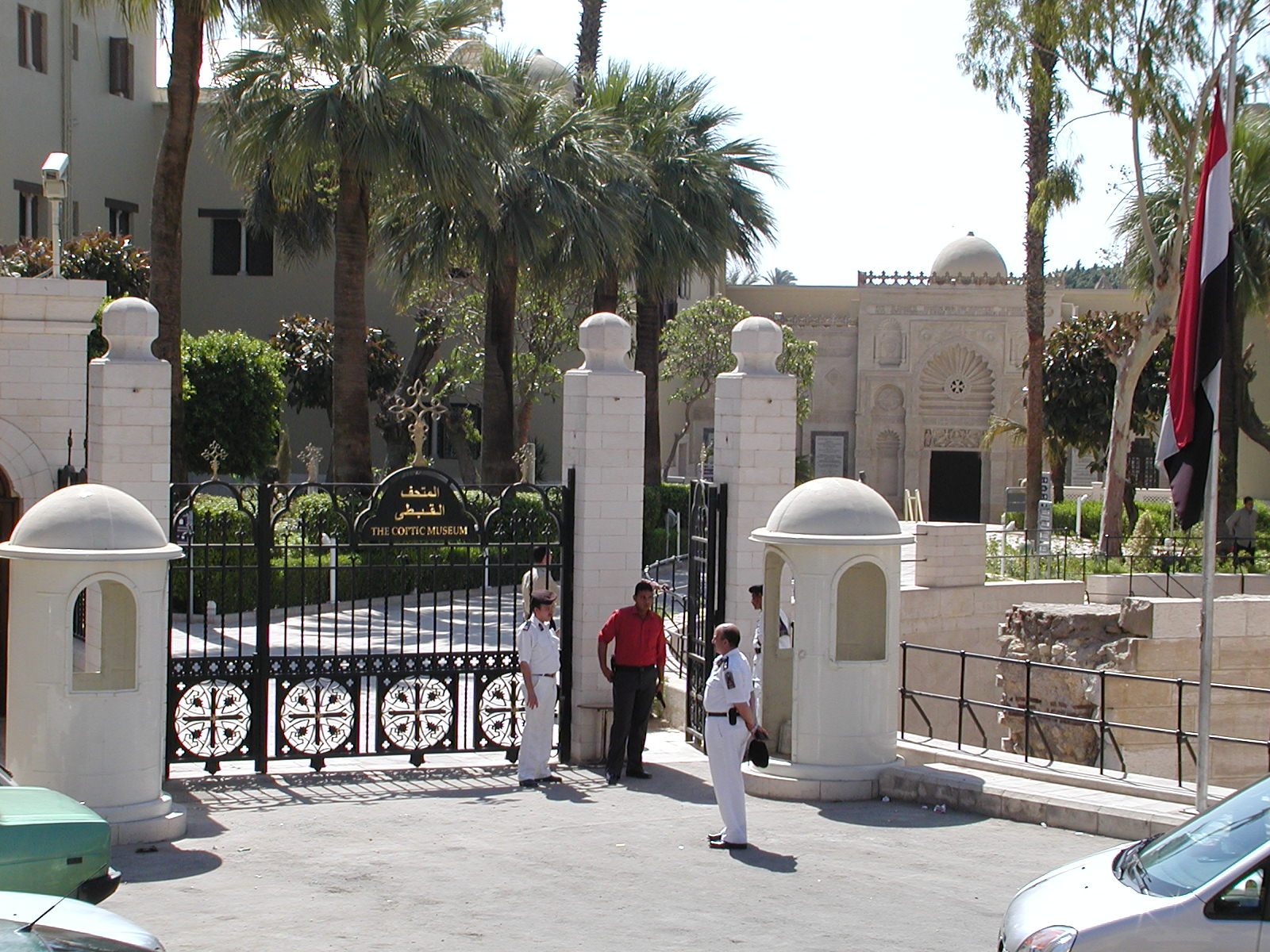
Coptic Museum entrance

The Coptic Museum contains the world's largest collection of Coptic artifacts and artwork. Coptic monuments display a rich mixture of Egyptian, Greek, Roman, Byzantine, Axumite and Ottoman traditions, linking ancient and Islamic Egypt.

The objects are grouped into different mediums, such as stonework, woodwork, metalwork, textiles and manuscripts. The total number of objects on display is around 15,000.

=== Nag Hammadi Library ===
The Coptic Museum also houses a corpus of 1,200 Nag Hammadi manuscripts in a library open to specialist researchers only.

== See also ==
- Coptic art
- Coptic Orthodox Church
- Coptic history
- Coptology
- List of museums in Egypt
