= Church of St. George (Cairo) =

Coordinates: 30°00′23″N 31°13′48″E

Saint George Greek Orthodox Church
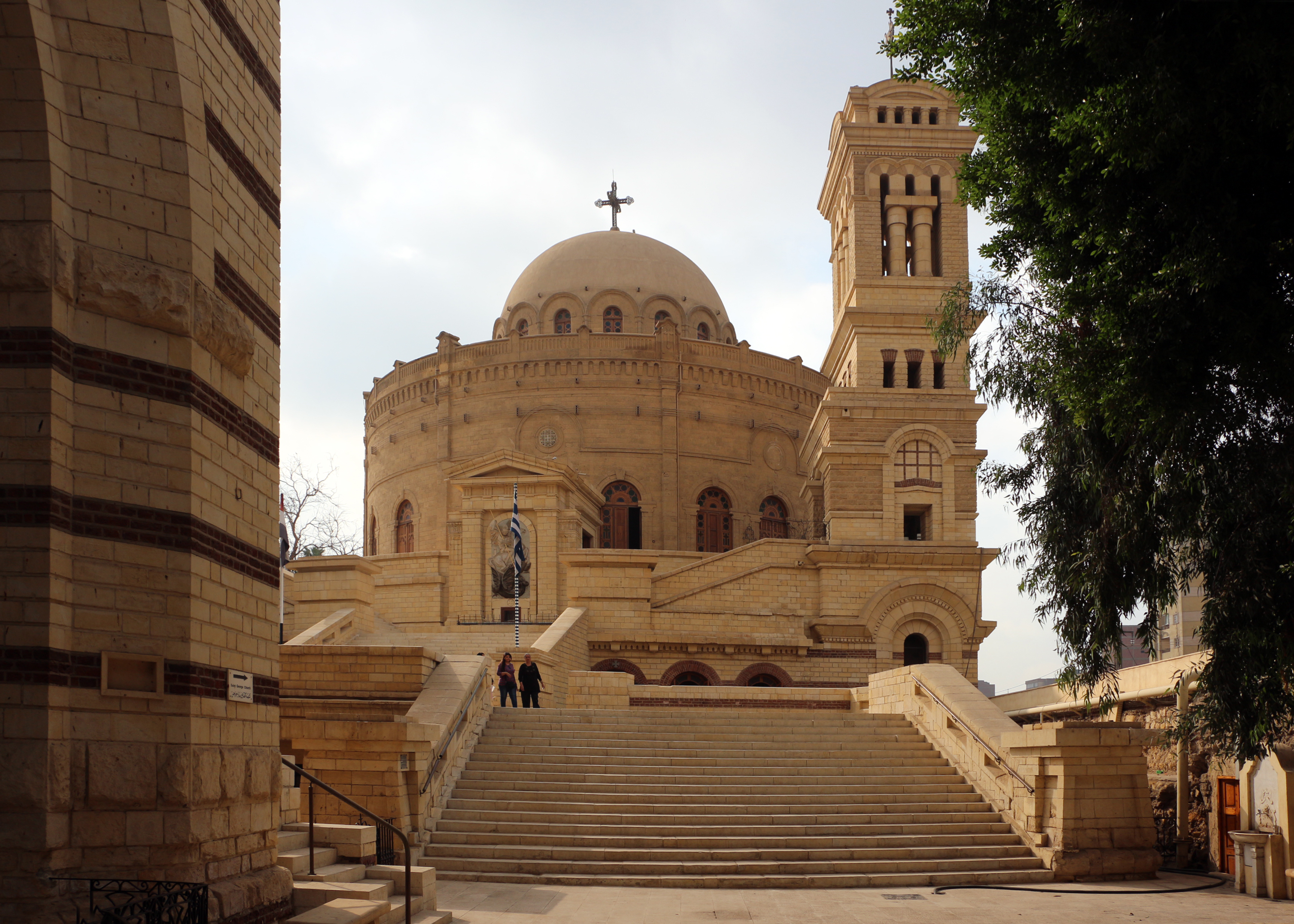
- Saint George Greek Orthodox Church
- Location: Babylon Fortress, Coptic Cairo
- Country: Egypt
- Denomination: Greek Orthodox Church of Alexandria
- Website: www.patriarchateofalexandria.com

History
- Dedication: Saint George

Architecture
- Years built: 10th century

Administration
- Division: The Greek Orthodox Patriarchate

Clergy
- Bishop: Patriarch Theodore II of Alexandria

The Church of St. George (Greek: Εκκλησία Αγίου Γεωργίου; Arabic: كنيسة القديس جورج, romanized: Kanīsat al-Qiddīs Jūrj) is a Greek Orthodox church within the Babylon Fortress in Coptic Cairo. It is part of the Holy Patriarchal Monastery of St George under the Greek Orthodox Patriarchate of Alexandria and all Africa.

The church dates back to the 10th century (or earlier). The current structure was rebuilt following a 1904 fire, with construction completed in 1909. Since 2009, the monastery's hegumen has held the rank of bishop with the title Bishop Babylonos ("Bishop of Babylon").

== Additional structures and features ==
=== Architectural layout ===
The Church of St. George is circular in form and supported by eight internal columns. Its design is architecturally comparable to the Basilica of San Vitale in Ravenna.

The church was once enclosed by an ancient wall that spanned half a square kilometer, though most of it has been lost. In 1998, the Greek government funded the reconstruction of the wall with two main entrances: one leading to the residence of the Hegumen, and the other to the Greek cemetery on the premises.

=== Monastic complex ===
The monastery houses several significant features:

- The official residence of the Patriarch of Alexandria is located within the monastery grounds.
- Adjacent to the church is the Museum of the Greek Orthodox Patriarchate of Alexandria, which contains icons and ecclesiastical relics.
- Inside the church is a nilometer—an ancient instrument for measuring the Nile River's water levels—positioned at the center of the floor.
- Underneath the church, within the first level of the fortress structure, are chapels and the tombs of former Patriarchs of Alexandria. These areas are currently closed to the public.

=== Cemetery and funeral chapel ===
A cemetery on the grounds is divided into Greek and Coptic sections. At its center stands the Church of the Dormition of the Theotokos, which is used only for funeral services.

=== Holy Family tradition ===
A chapel attached to the church is traditionally believed to mark the site of a cave where the Holy Family is said to have sought refuge during their flight into Egypt.

=== Historical mentions ===
While the Coptic monastery is mentioned as early as the 10th century, references to the Greek Orthodox monastery begin in the 15th century. In the 1550s, Russian traveler Vasily Poznyakov visited the monastery and described a miraculous icon of Saint George located behind bronze bars, revered for healings and miracles:

"In Old Egypt there is a great church of Saint George the Trophy-Bearer, a women's monastery, and in the church, on the left side, is an icon of Saint George behind bronze bars. Many miracles and healings are attributed to this icon."

== Gallery ==
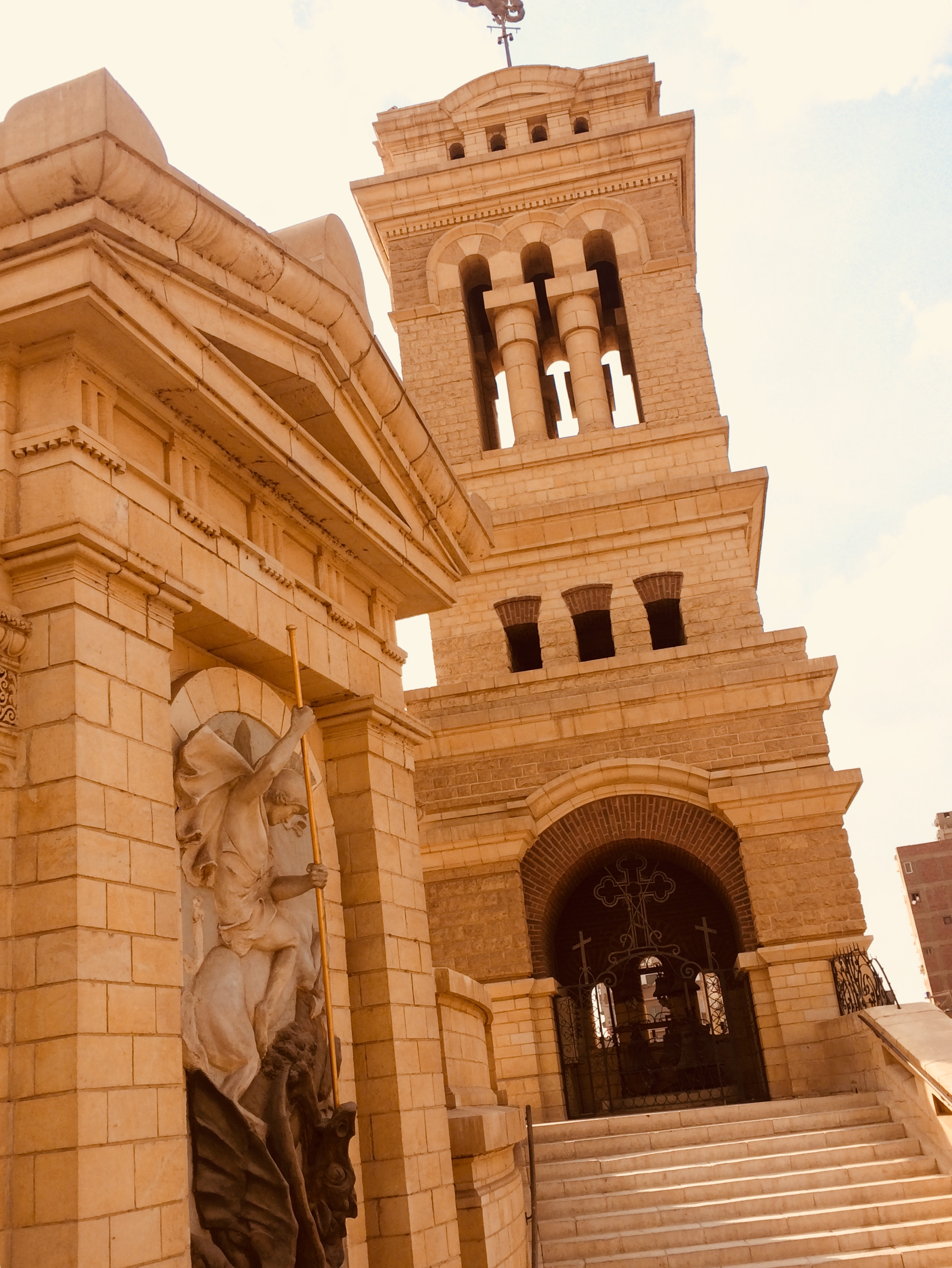
Bas-relief of Saint George slaying the dragon with a spear, at the church entrance

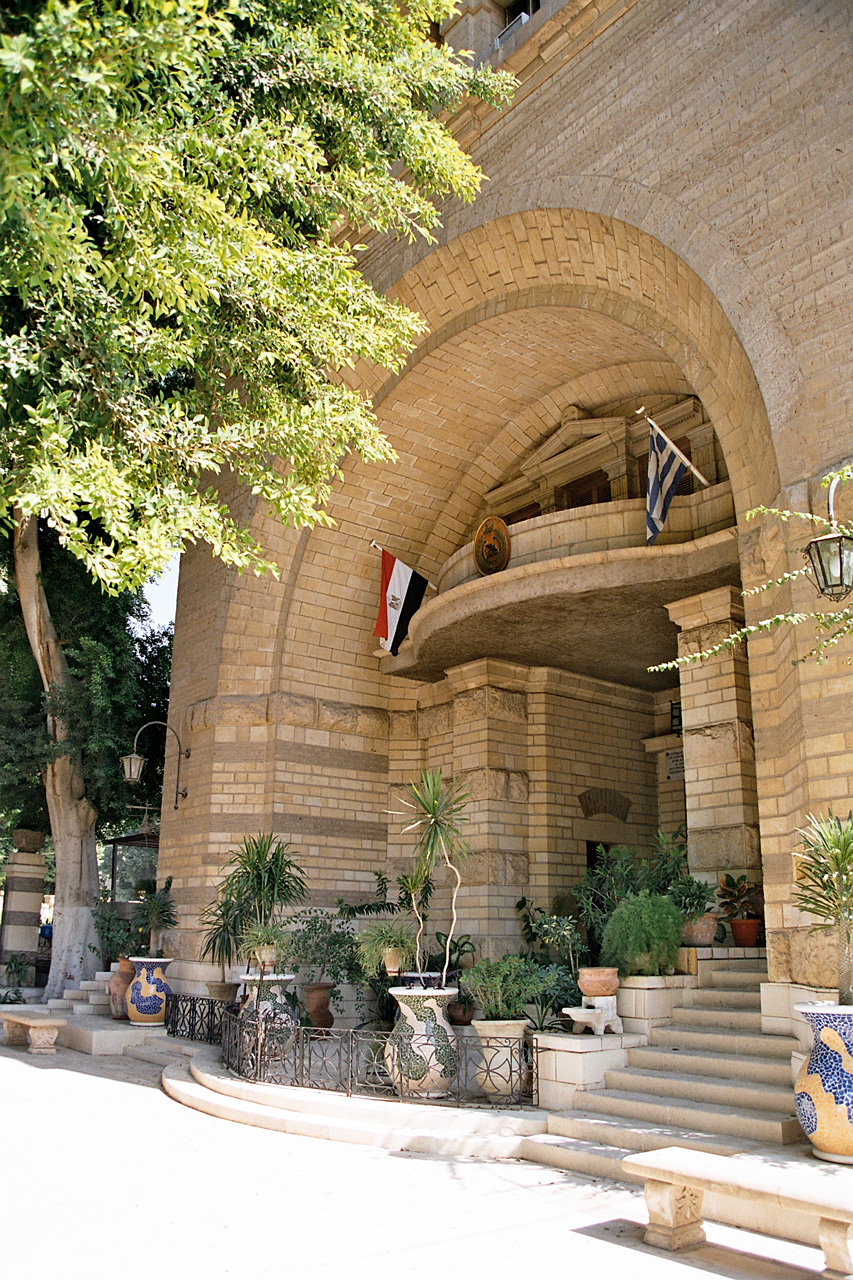
View of the entrance to the Monastery of Saint George

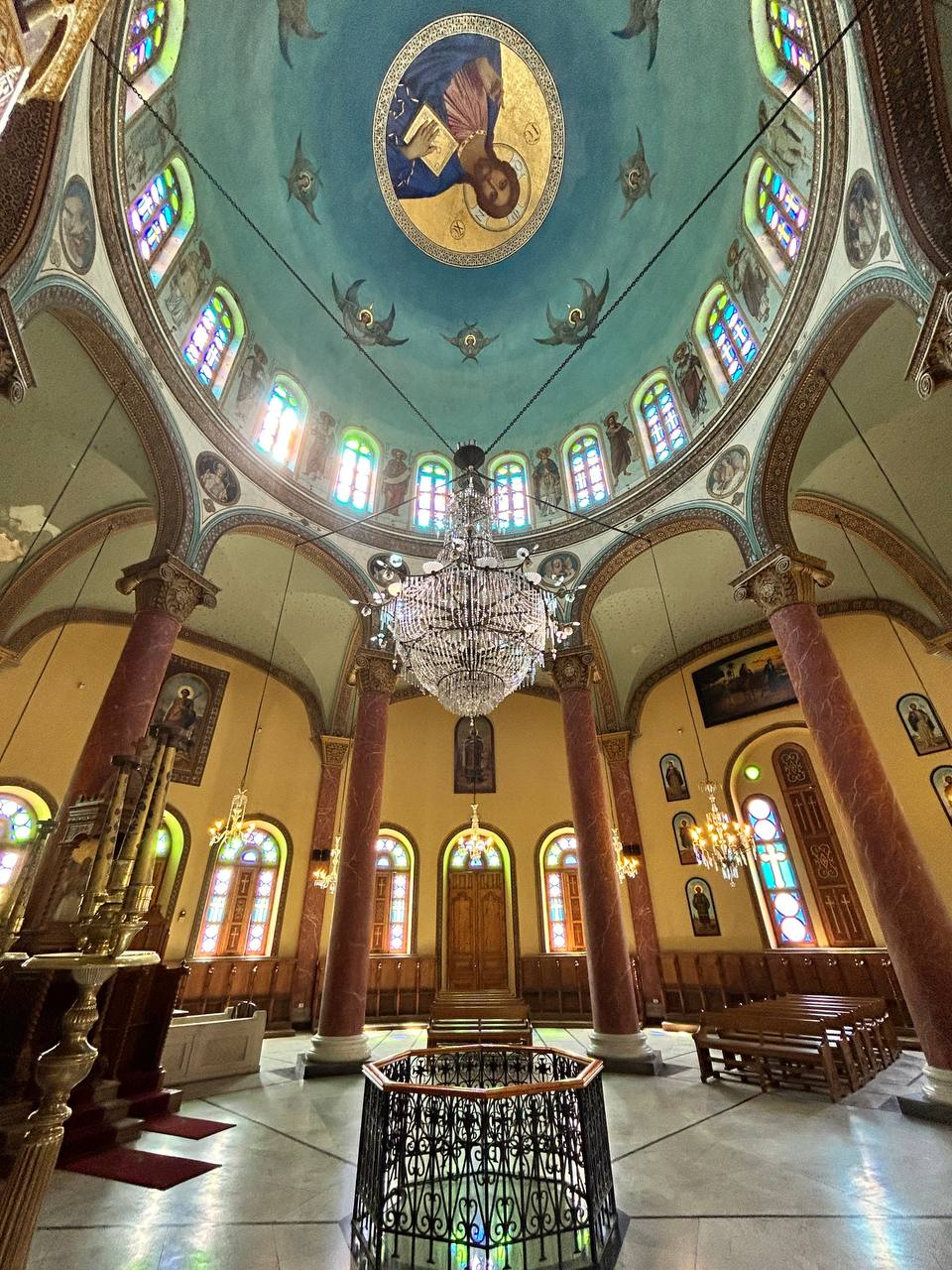
The ceiling of the Church of Saint George in Cairo is rich with history and sacred artistry. It rises in a graceful dome, drawing the eyes upward as if inviting the visitor to look toward heaven.

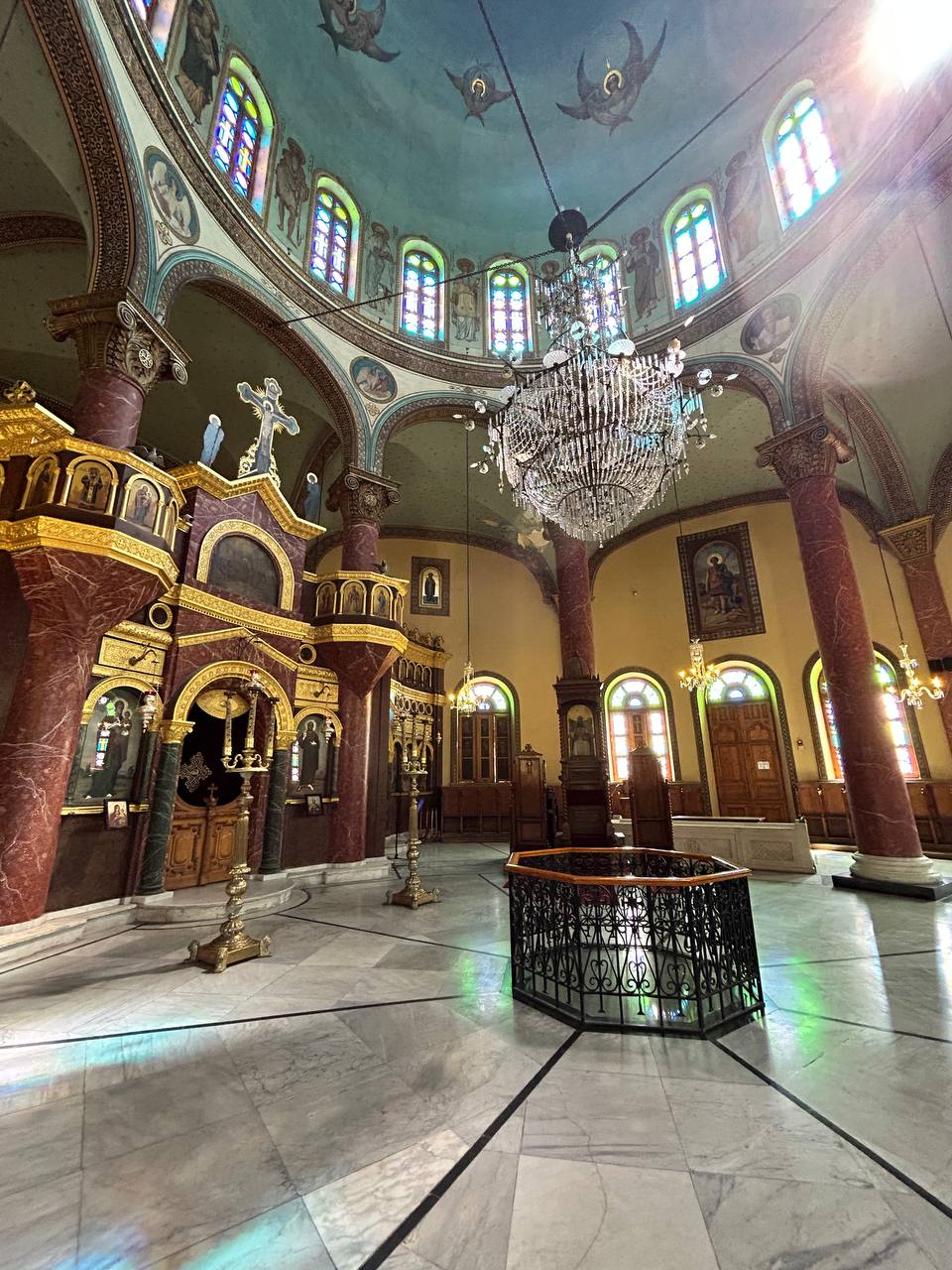
A spacious hall crowned with a painted blue dome surrounded by colorful stained-glass windows. Red marble columns support the arches, giving the space balance and dignity.

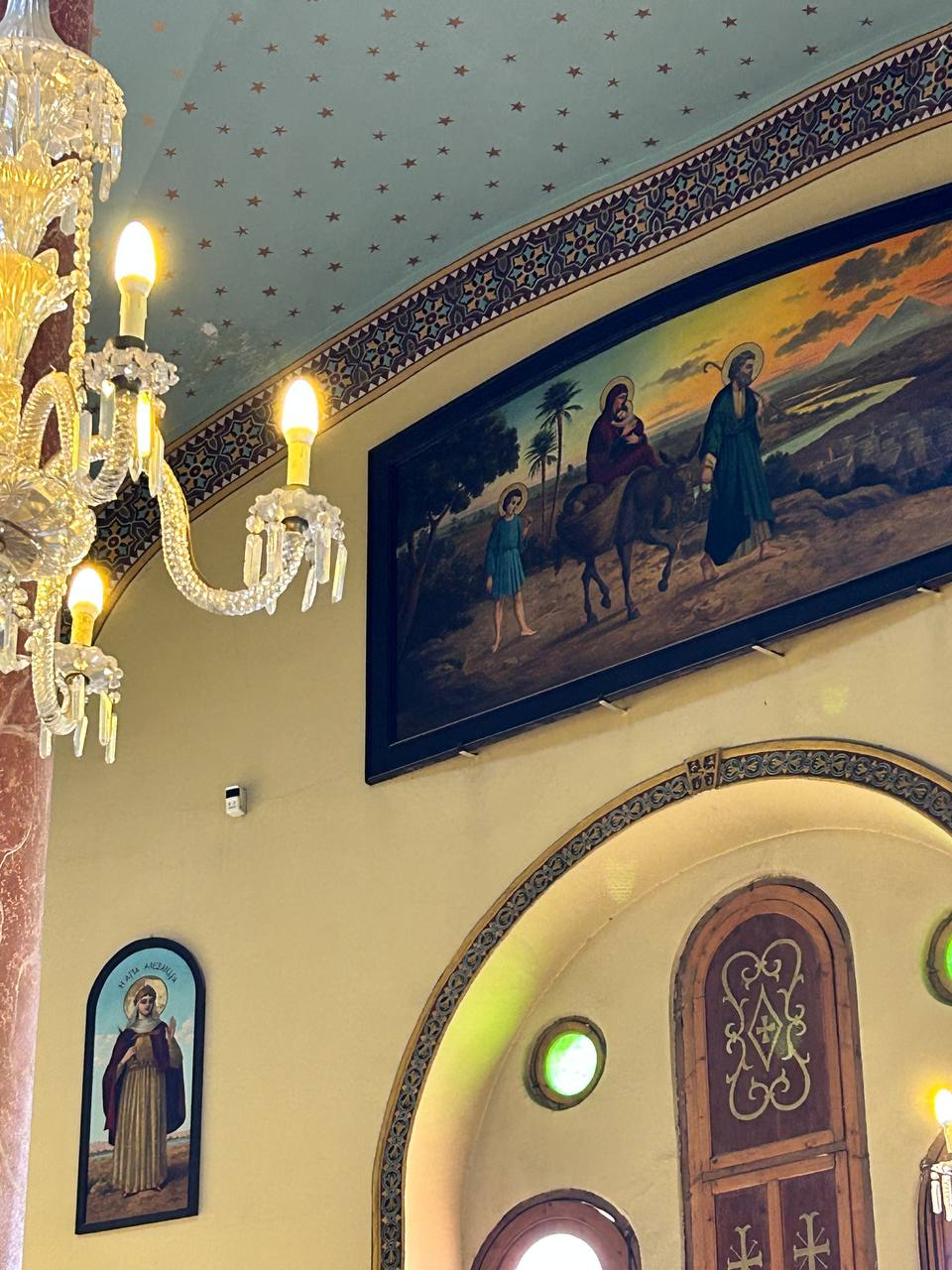
The image appears like a living moment lifted gently from history. Mary sits gracefully upon the back of a humble donkey, holding the Child Jesus in her arms small, quiet, like a soft light resting in the hands of mercy.

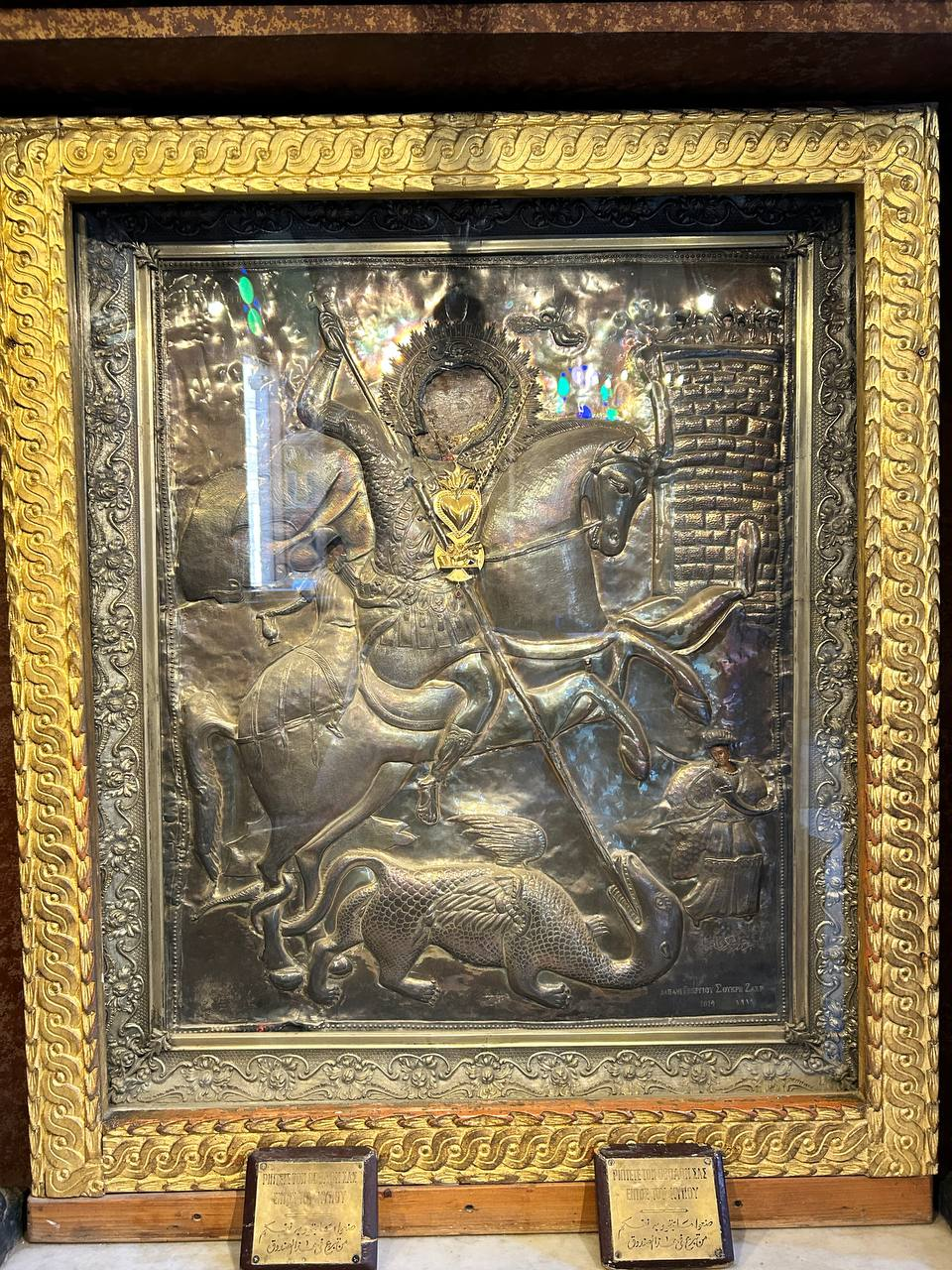
This is a magnificent dedicatory plaque. The name of a family the Aus Family is carved into the stone not once, but three times in a beautiful, clear script.

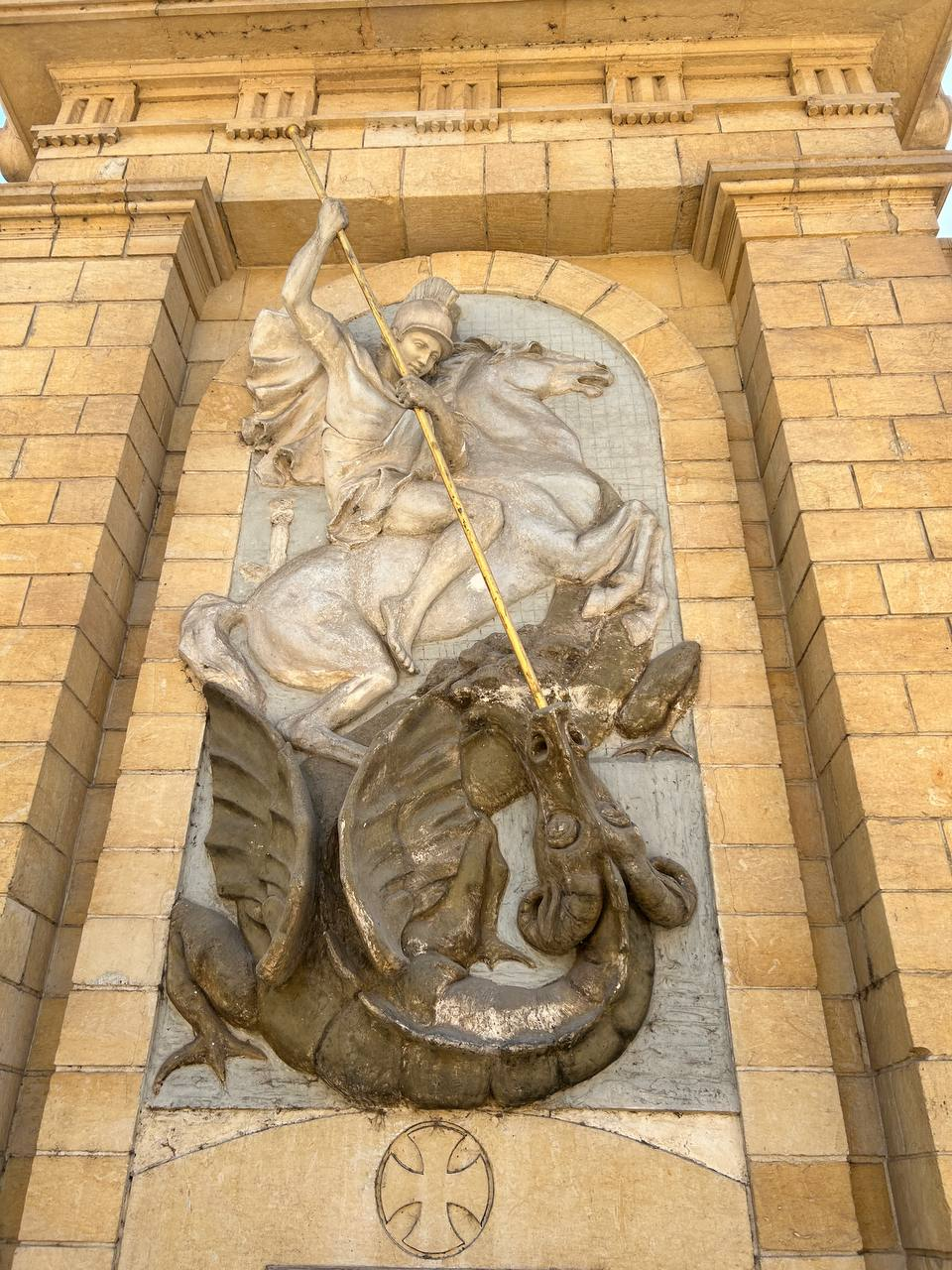
In this image, Saint George is shown riding a horse, lifting a spear as he strikes a dragon-like serpent beneath him. The horse stands proudly, while the beast struggles under its hooves.

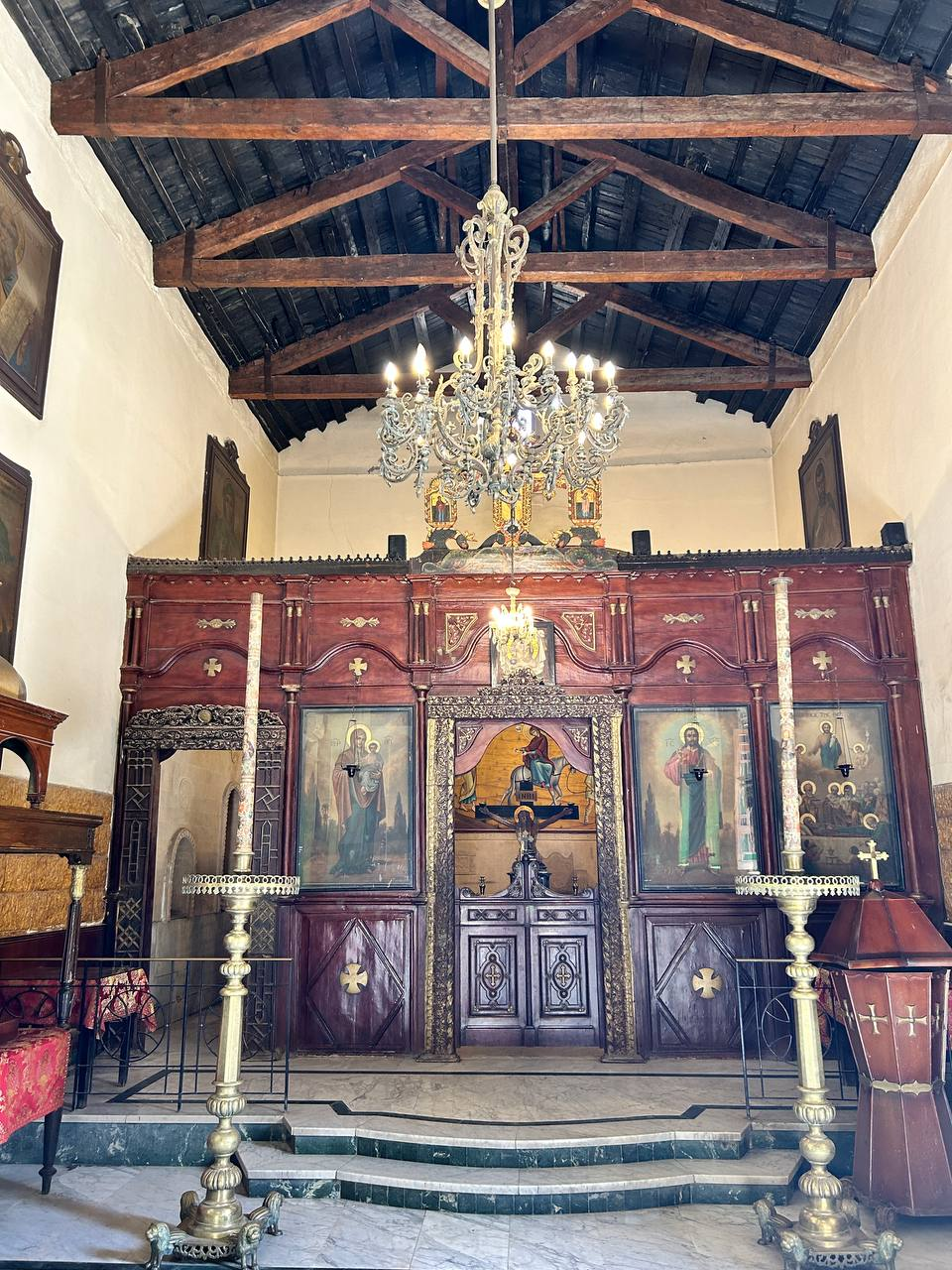
Carved deeply into it is an ancient inscription, written in a formal and elegant script that looks like it could be Coptic or early Greek. The same phrase is masterfully repeated, creating a powerful rhythmic pattern.

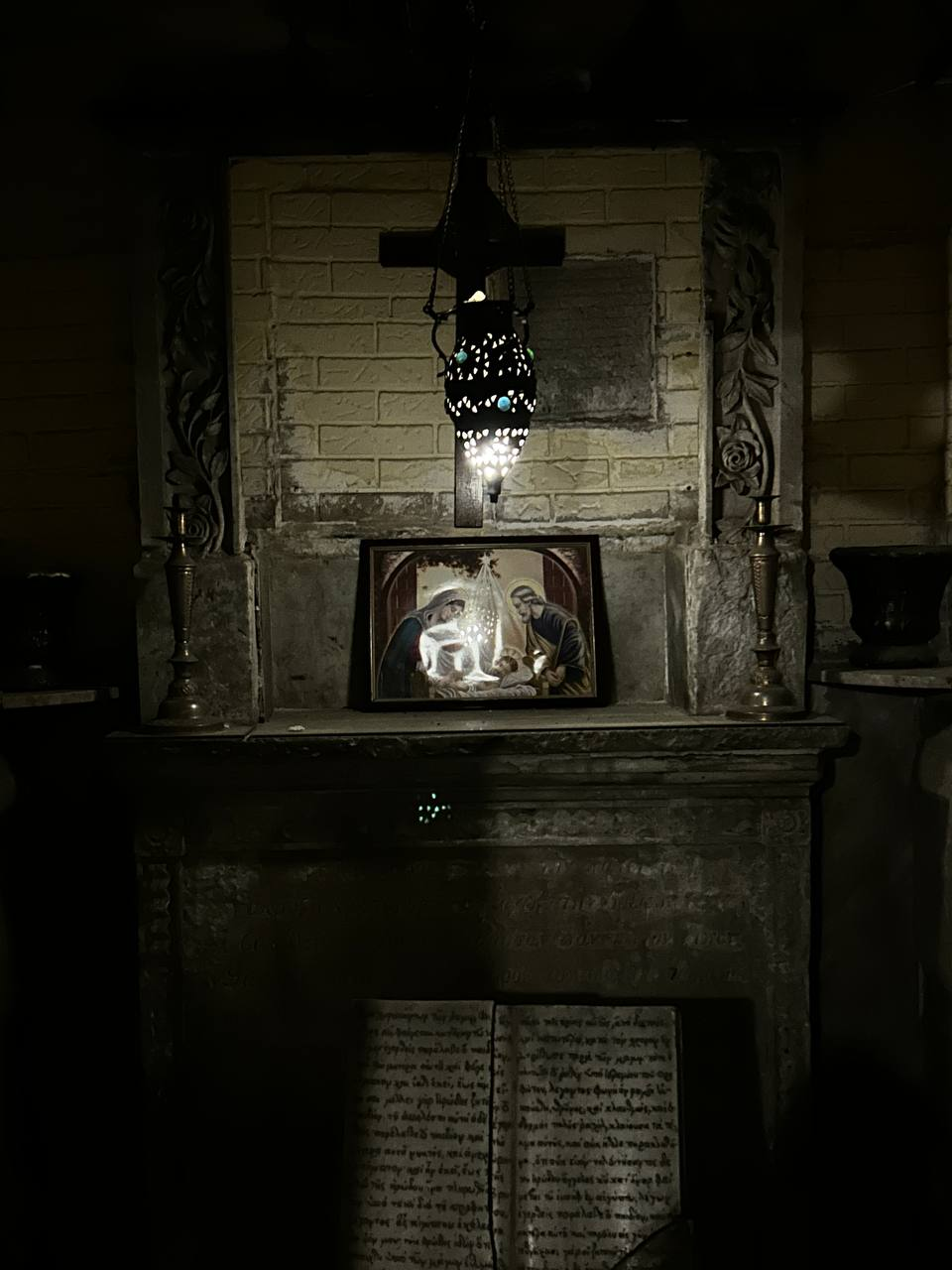
The room is dimly lit, and the focus of the scene is a framed icon resting upon an old stone altar. The icon shows Mary, Joseph, and the infant Jesus a depiction of the Holy Family glowing softly under a hanging lantern.
