= Marcus Simaika =

Egyptian archaeologist (1864–1944)

Marcus Simaika Pasha

Marcus Simaika (Arabic: مرقص سميكة باشا; Coptic: ⲙⲁⲣⲕⲟⲥ ⲥⲓⲙⲁⲓⲕⲁ ⲡⲁϣⲁ) (1864–1944) was an Egyptian leader, politician, and founder of the Coptic Museum in Cairo.

== Early life and education ==
Simaika was born in Cairo on 28 February 1864 to one of the oldest Coptic families of Cairene notables. The Simaikas prospered in the service of state and church; many served as magistrates.

Simaika started his education at St. Mark's Coptic Patriarchal school in Cairo. As was custom at the time, he was chosen by his father to become a priest, as at least one son of the leading Coptic families was destined to priesthood. As a result, his father forbade him to learn English fearing it would detract him from his ecclesiastical studies. Simaika went on a hunger strike until his father gave in and allowed him to study English. At school he studied the Bible and learned Arabic, Coptic, Greek, and English. He then transferred to Frères des écoles chrétiennes to learn French and graduated in 1882.

== Early career ==
Upon graduation, Simaika joined the engineering department of the Egyptian State Railways as a translator then as an accountant, and in 1888 was promoted to chief of contracts and purchases. In 1890, he became secretary to the chairman of the board. Eight years later he was promoted to director of the commercial department and in 1901 director general of accounts and audit. He reorganized the accounts system of the railways, telegraphs and port of Alexandria, rooting out deep-seated endemic corruption and inefficiency. He became the only Egyptian to reach such high rank.

In 1904, after the Fashoda incident and the Entente Cordiale, the French handed over the administration of the Egyptian government to the British who decided that all important departments would be headed by British officials. Simaika was asked to stay on for another two years to help his replacement, then allowed to retire on an exceptional pension with the addition of eight years to his period of service.

== Political career ==
Simaika was appointed a permanent Member of the Legislative Council of the Khedivate of Egypt from 1907 to 1911 and was the reporter of the finance and budget committee. He was then re-appointed to the council from 1912 to 1922. He became a member of the Superior Educational Council from 1907 to 1922. He joined the Comite de Conservation des Monuments Arabes et Coptes first as a member then as president of its permanent committee in 1905 and 1929, respectively. He worked tirelessly on the until his death in 1944. He was proposed to be the Coptic minister of the cabinet of Muhammad Said Pasha in 1910. During his membership of the Legislative Council, Simaika succeeded in introducing religious instruction for non-Muslim pupils in all government schools. He also succeeded in obtaining grants to all private schools for boys and girls subject to inspection by the Ministry of Education.

== Coptic Church leadership ==
Simiaika was first elected to the General Congregation Council (Maglis Milli) in 1885 at the age of 25 and elected vice-president of the Maglis from 1908 to 1928. During this time he had a difficult relationship with the Pope Cyril V. Simaika allied himself with the Maglis reformists in their demand that the Maglis should have more say in the administration of Coptic schools and awqafs (religious endowments) as well as the personal state laws on divorce and inheritance. It became a show of strength between the Maglis and the Coptic Church hierarchy. In 1890 things came to a head, Patriarch Cyril refused to recognize the Maglis and the latter with the help of Lord Cromer and Prime Minister Mostafa Fahmy Pasha exiled Patriarch Cyril V to a Monastery. This caused a backlash within the Coptic community who thought this was an Anglican plot to take over the Coptic Church. The Pope was subsequently released from exile in 1893 and the Maglis dissolved. Simaika was one of only two Maglis hardliners who refused to sign the petition to recall the Patriarch from his desert exile. Soon another Maglis was elected and again Simaika, in spite of opposition from the Patriarch and clergy, was elected a member. This Maglis avoided confrontation and confined their duties to putting the Patriarchal affairs in order. By then, Simaika had matured considerably, and as the seed of an idea of building a Coptic museum had started to germinate, he knew he would need the permission of Pope Cyril V to start this project, and toned down his campaign for communal reform, made his peace with Cyril and as a result was given permission to build the museum on Church premises.

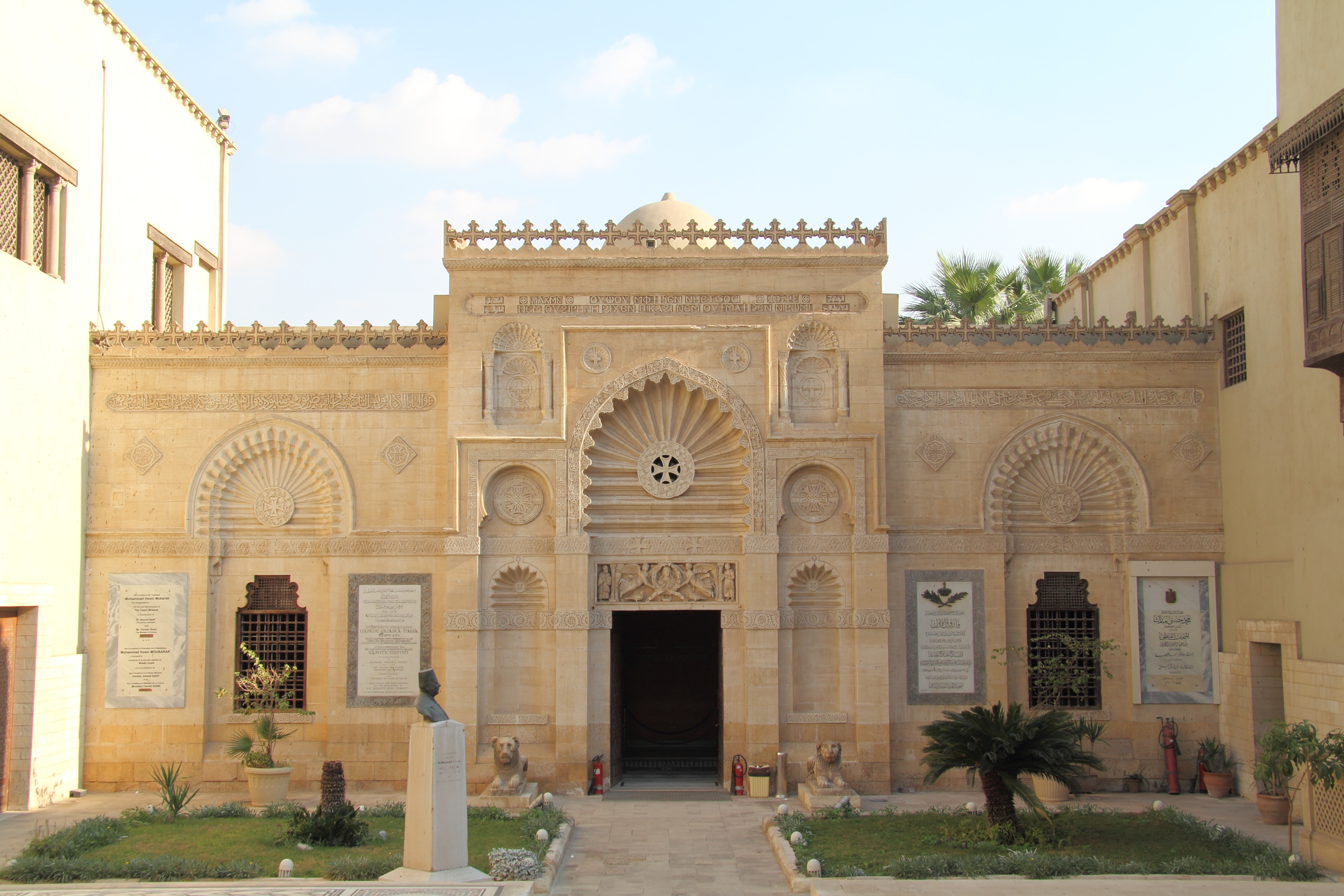
The entrance of the Coptic Museum. A plaque with Marcus Simaika Pasha's name in Coptic and Arabic and his bust are on the left side

Whilst engaged in the repair and restoration of ancient Coptic Churches, Simaika collected a large quantity of carved wood and stone fragments and in 1907 thought of starting a small Coptic Museum. In 1908 Simaika, in his capacity of vice-president of the Maglis, found Pope Cyril supervising while a silversmith weighed out old silver Gospel covers and church vessels to be melted for reworking. On closer inspection, he noted that these silver objects belonged to the 14th and 15th centuries and carried Coptic and Arabic inscriptions. He offered to pay the market value of these objects which would be stored in a room that would be the nucleus of the proposed museum. Simaika proposed to start the museum in one room adjoining The Hanging Church in old Cairo and to entrust the entire collection to the care of the priests of the Church so that the objects would continue to be Church property. Cyril gave his approval and the Coptic Museum was born.

Simaika visited, with Cyril's authority, all the Coptic Churches and the desert monasteries, rummaging in basements and lumber rooms for objects to add to the collection. Simaika paid the church a nominal price for objects he selected. A subscription list for the museum was started in January 1908. The Egyptian royal family, cabinet ministers, notables of all creeds, the British advisers and Simaika's colleagues in the various councils contributed generously. The Coptic Museum formally opened in 1910. In 1930 at the request of King Fuad I, the Coptic museum was made a State institution with Simaika director for life.

Simaika had a major role in saving Coptic manuscripts. Cyril donated the most valuable manuscripts in the Patriarchal library, including the four gospels in Arabic, beautifully illuminated. In 1912, Simaika visited the libraries the monasteries and found manuscripts scattered about various cells, exposed to dust and destruction and used to light fires. The libraries of the churches were in not in much better state. With the permission of Cyril V and his successor Pope John XIX, Simaika arranged and catalogued the libraries of the monasteries, Churches and Patriarchate with the help of Yassa Abdel Messih and subsequently issued Catalogue of Coptic and Arabic Manuscripts in the Coptic Museum, the Patriarchate, the Principal Churches of Cairo and Alexandria and the Monasteries of Egypt in three volumes in 1936, in both Arabic and English.

== Honors ==
Simaika was honored in his lifetime, promoted to Bey in 1899 and to Pasha (the highest honor bestowed on a civilian at that time) in 1915. He was elected Member of the Royal Geographical Society in 1917, Honorary Member of the Society of Antiquaries and Fellow of the Society of Archaeologists. He was awarded the Turkish Order of Osmanieh in 1901 followed by the Order of the Medjidie in 1912. He was made Commander of the Order of Albrecht of Saxony in 1913, Grand Officier de l’etoile d’Ethiopie in 1923, Grand Officier de la Couronne de Roumanie in 1930, Grand Officier de l’ordre de Leopold II de Belgique in 1930, Officier de l’Instruction Publique de France in 1931, Commander of the Order of the British Empire in 1934, Grand Officier de la Couronne d’Italie in 1934, Grand Officier de l’Ordre du Nile in 1936, Officier de la Légion d'honneur in 1937 and Grand Officier of the Star of Sweden in 1942. Simaika was invited to lecture at Cambridge in 1924, as well as in Berlin and Stockholm on Coptic art and archaeology.

Simaika died on 2 October 1944.
