= Saints Sergius and Bacchus Church =

Coptic Orthodox church in Cairo, Egypt

Saint Sergius & Saint Bacchus Coptic Orthodox Church
- ϯⲉⲕⲕⲗⲏⲥⲓⲁ ⲛ̀ⲧⲉ ⲛⲓ⳥ ⲥⲉⲣⲅⲓⲟⲥ ⲛⲉⲙ ⲃⲁⲭⲟⲥ ϧⲉⲛ ⲡⲓⲥⲡⲉⲗⲉⲱⲛ
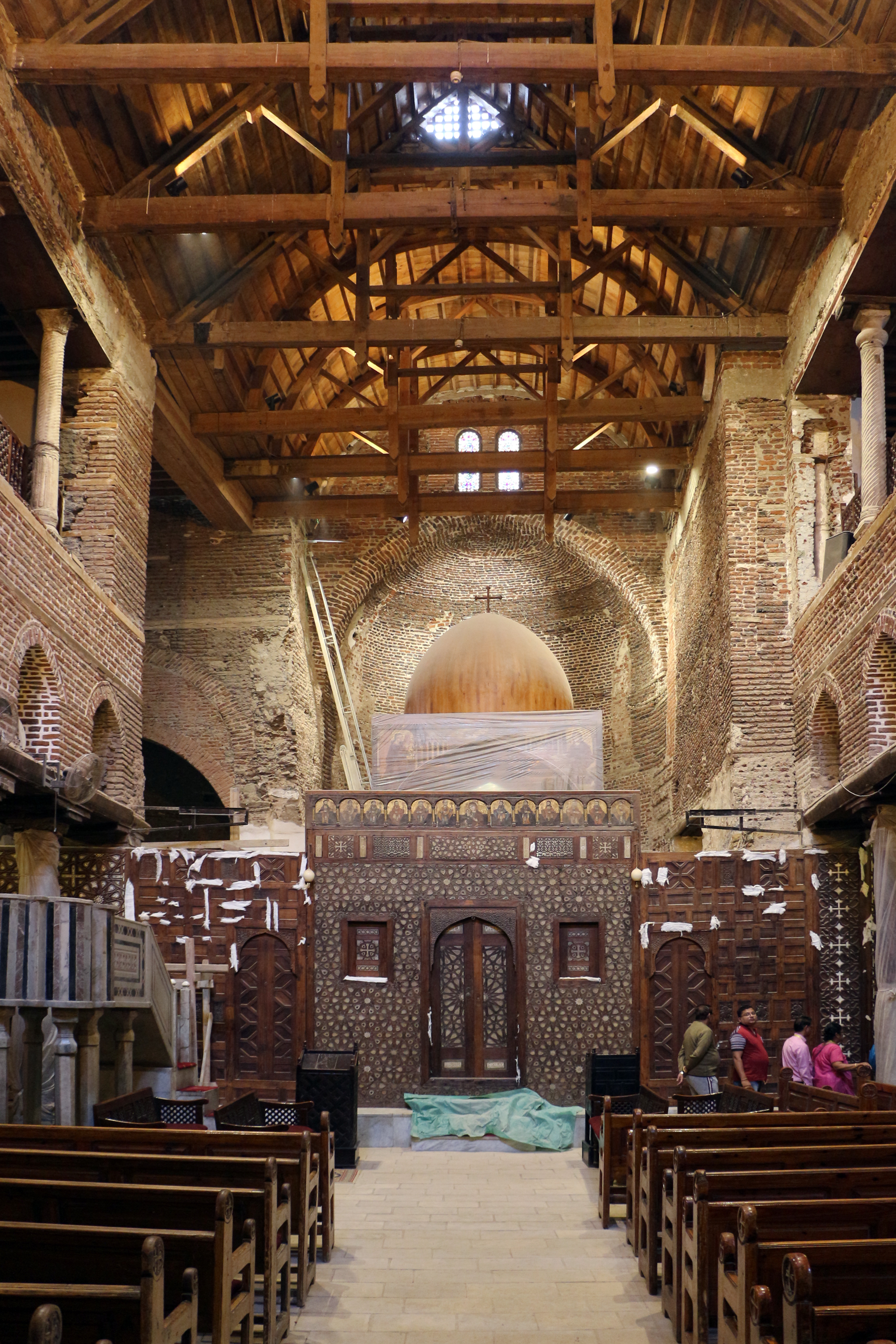
- Saint Sergius & Saint Bacchus Church, 2015
- Saint Sergius & Saint Bacchus Coptic Orthodox Church
- 30.0058°N 31.2307°E
- Location: Babylon Fortress, Coptic Cairo
- Country: Egypt
- Denomination: Coptic Orthodox Church
- Website: www.coptic-cairo.com/oldcairo/church/sarga/sarga.html

History
- Dedication: Saints Sergius and Bacchus
- Consecrated: 4th century

Architecture
- Architectural type: church
- Style: Coptic

Administration
- Division: The Coptic Orthodox Patriarchate
- Diocese: Coptic Orthodox Diocese of Old Cairo, Manial and Fum Al-Khalig

Clergy
- Bishop(s): Pope Tawadros II; Bishop Selwaniss
- Priest: Fr. Ghobrial Guirguis Bestawros

Saints Sergius and Bacchus Church (Coptic: ϯⲉⲕⲕⲗⲏⲥⲓⲁ ⲛ̀ⲧⲉ ⲛⲓ⳥ ⲥⲉⲣⲅⲓⲟⲥ ⲛⲉⲙ ⲃⲁⲭⲟⲥ ϧⲉⲛ ⲡⲓⲥⲡⲉⲗⲉⲱⲛ, The Church of Martyrs Sergius and Bacchus in The Cave) (Arabic: كنيسة القديسين سرجيوس و باخوس (أبو سرجة)), also known as the Abu Serga Church, is one of the oldest Coptic Christian churches in Egypt, dating back to the 7th century. Located in Old Cairo, this church is significant to Christians for its connection to the flight of the Holy Family into Egypt. The current church was constructed above Roman ruins and exemplifies early Coptic architecture.

== History ==
The church of Saint Sergius and Bacchus was founded in the late 7th century by Athanasius, a scribe of the Umayyad governor of Egypt Abd al-Aziz ibn Marwan (685–705). Athanasius, who came from Edessa in Syria, dedicated the church to Sergius and Bacchus, who were martyred there. The church was erected at the center of the remains of the Roman fortress of Babylon. Tradition holds that the Holy Family rested here during their journey from Bethlehem to Egypt. Around 750, it burned in a fire in Fustat during the reign of Marwan II. It was restored in the 8th century and renovated repeatedly in the centuries that followed.

Also known as "the Church of the Cave," the church was built above a crypt traditionally identified as a shelter of the Holy Family. The crypt lies directly below the high altar. (Note: The date of the crypt is disputed. Butler held that it is older than the main church, perhaps dating from the sixth century or earlier. Later excavation indicates that the crypt took its present form together with the present church; Sheehan dates this to around the thirteenth century, and Gabra likewise dates the crypt's architecture to the twelfth or thirteenth century, the period from which the earliest sources describing the Holy Family's resting place also derive.)

The church stands atop a 6.5-meter limestone wall, said to be a remnant of the entrance to the Amnis Traianus, a Roman canal built in the second century. Trajan dug the canal early in the second century AD to connect Rome and the Mediterranean, by way of the Nile, to the Red Sea and eastern trade routes.

Following its consecration in the 7th century, the church served as the site where many patriarchs and Coptic bishops were elected. The practice began with the election of Patriarch Isaac (681–692) and continued until the mid-eleventh century.

== Art and architecture ==
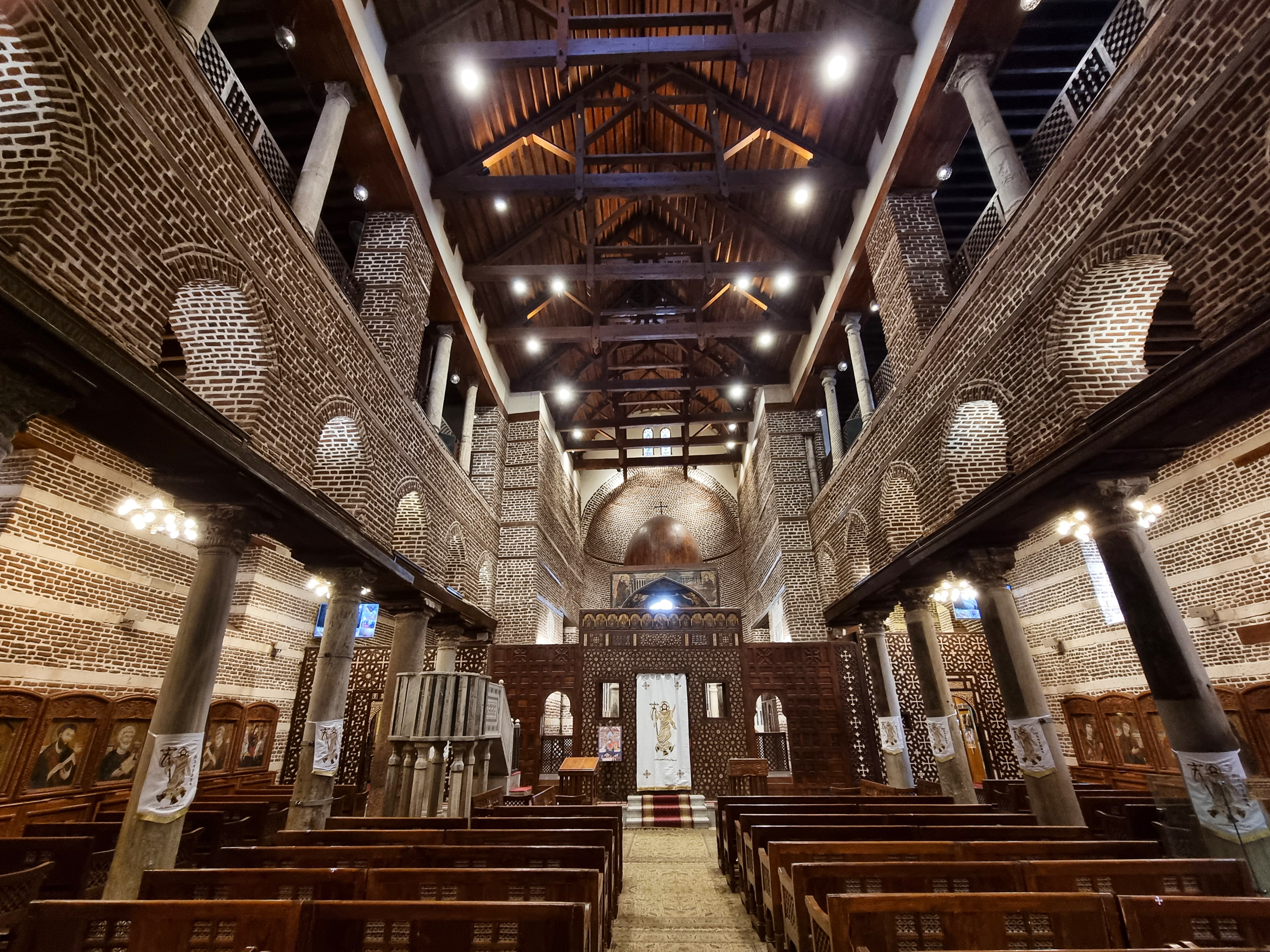
View of sanctuary, nave, and columns, 2022

Saints Sergius and Bacchus Church is an early example of Coptic basilica architecture and combines local Egyptian and Byzantine Christian elements.

=== Architectural layout ===
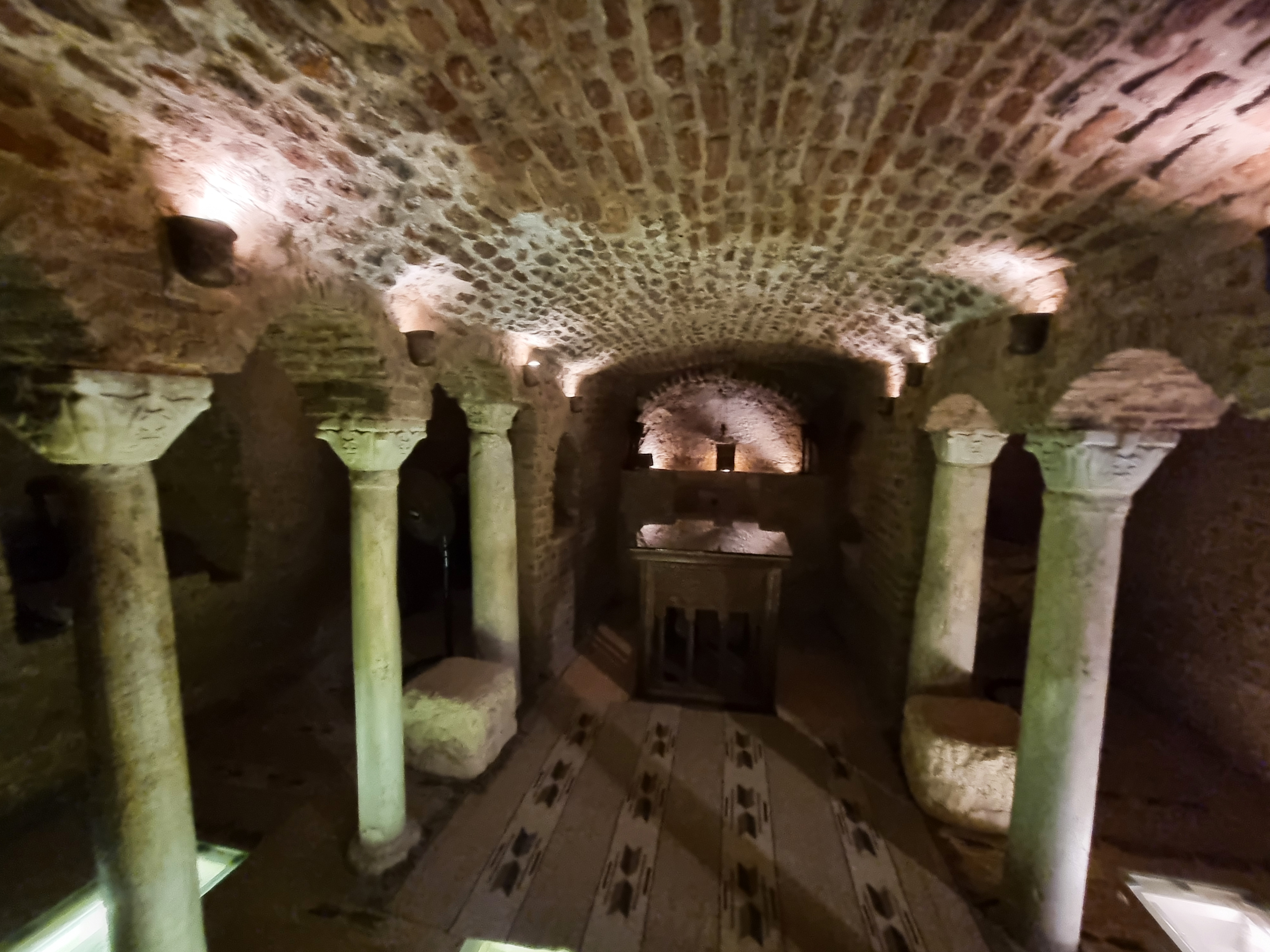
Crypt under the main sanctuary, 2022

The church follows the basilica plan, with a central nave under an elevated roof and two side aisles. A narthex forms the entrance, as in other early Christian churches. Beyond it, the nave and its flanking aisles are divided by rows of marble columns and form the main worship space. At the far end, raised a few steps above the nave, stands the sanctuary, which holds three altars: a central altar dedicated to Sergius and Bacchus, a southern altar to Saint George, and a northern altar to the Virgin Mary. The crypt lies beneath the sanctuary.

=== Ornament and decoration ===
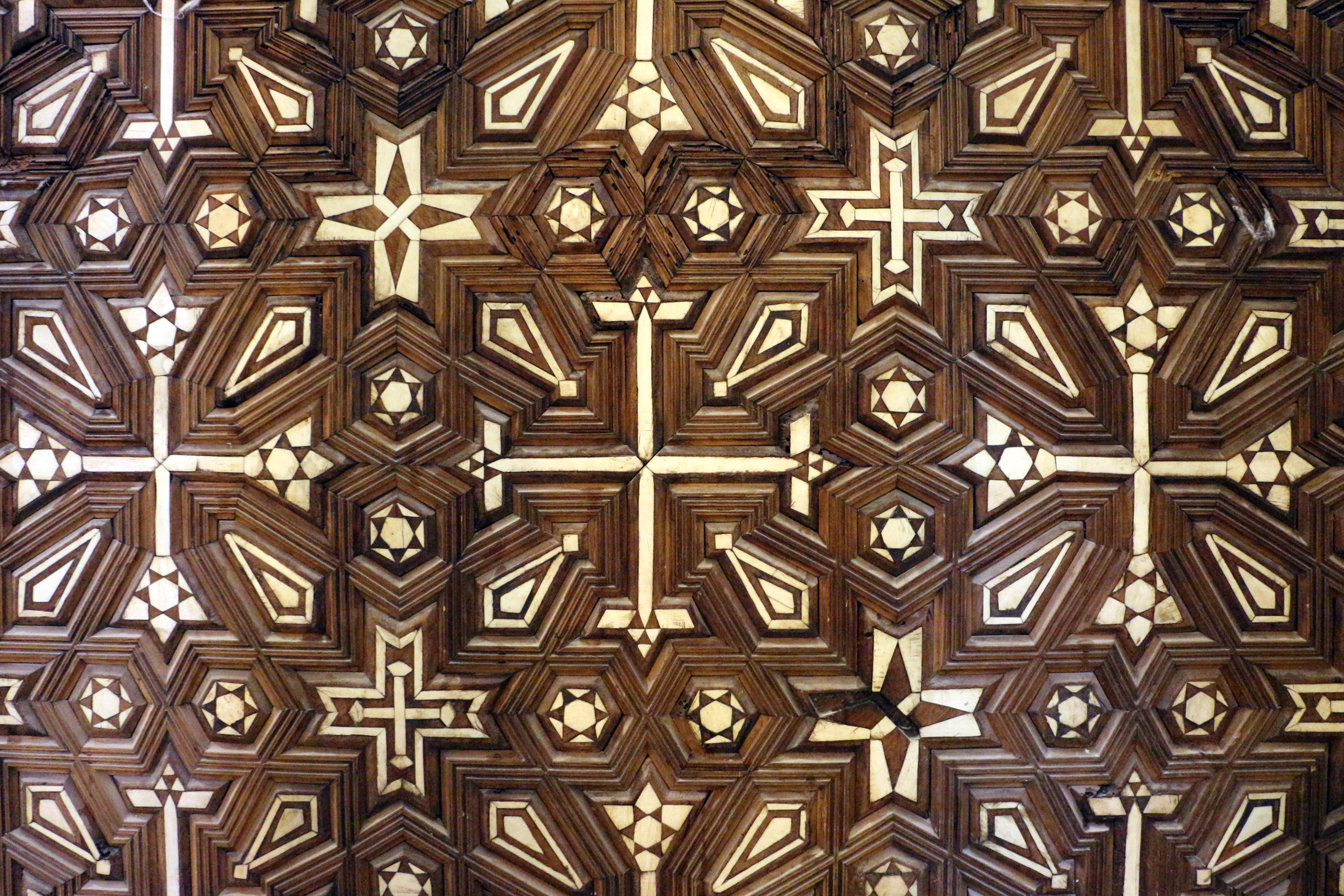
Inlaid wood patterns on the iconostasis, 2015.

The church holds numerous icons depicting religious scenes, apostles, and saints, among them Sergius, Bacchus, and George. The wooden ceiling is arched like an inverted ship's hull. The door panels and the iconostasis dividing the nave from the sanctuary are decorated with ivory-inlaid woodwork in geometric patterns.

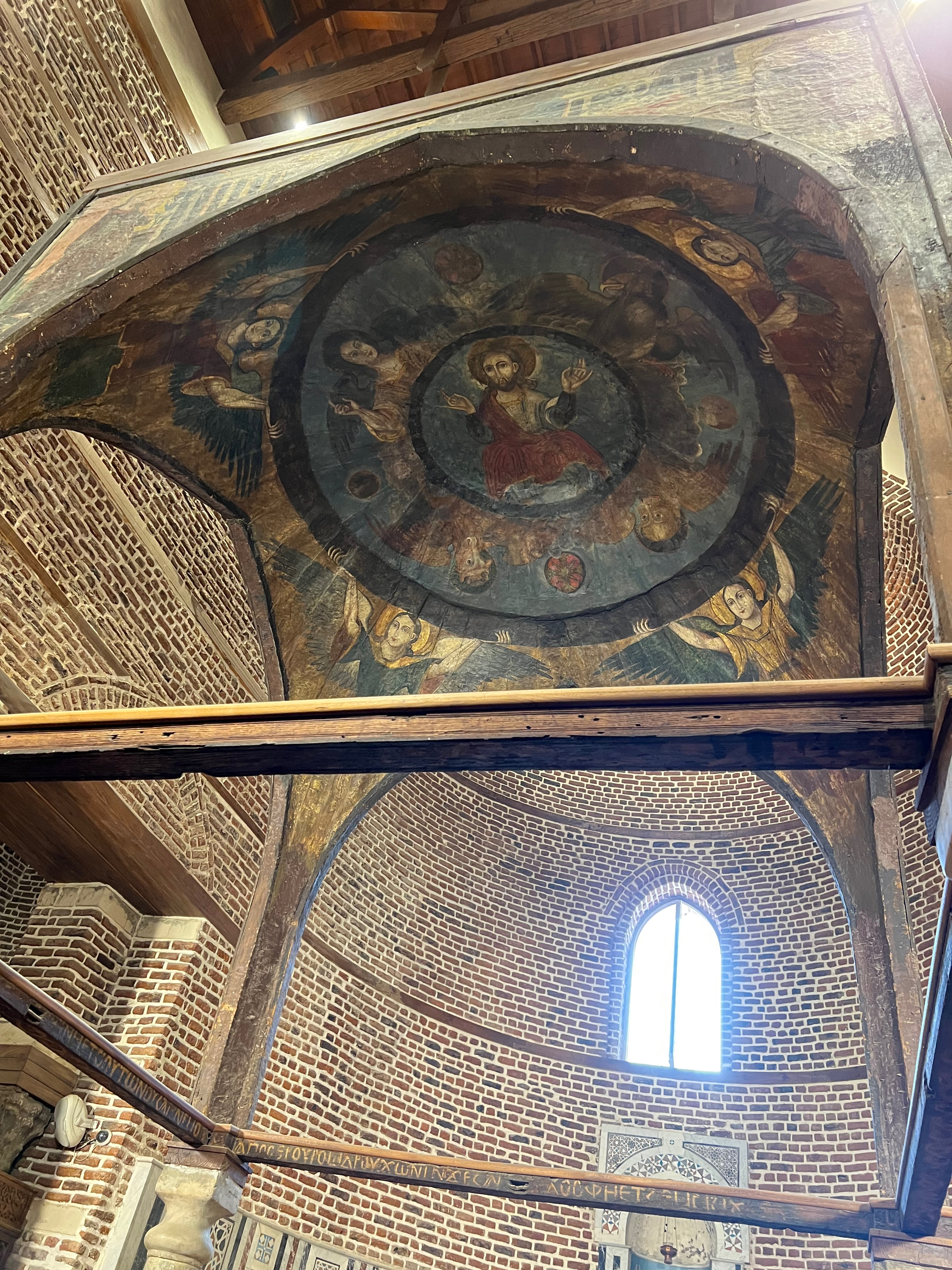
Freestanding domed structure in the sanctuary with fresco painting, 2022.

== See also ==
- Christian Egypt
- List of Coptic Orthodox churches in Egypt
