= Pahor Labib =

Egyptian egyptologist (1905–1994)

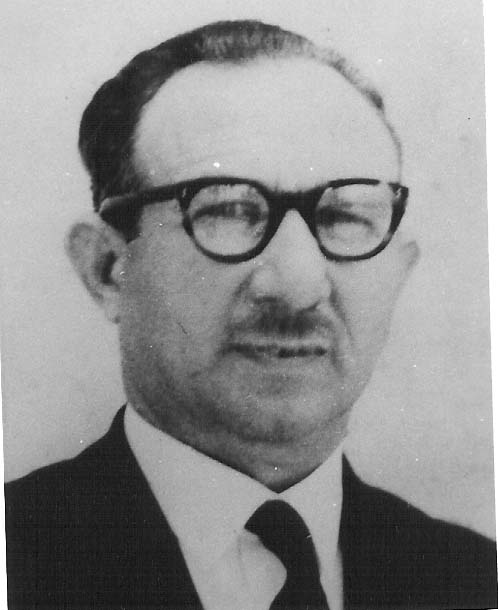
- Pahor Labib
- Born: 19 September 1905; Ein Shams, Egypt
- Died: 7 May 1994 (aged 88); Cairo, Egypt
- Education: Frederick William University, Berlin, Germany; University of Cairo
- Known for: study and publishing of Nag Hammadi library Gnostic Papyri
- Awards: High Cross from West Germany, 1976; World Decoration of Denmark, 1963
- Scientific career
- Fields: Egyptology, Coptology
- Workplaces: Coptic Museum, Cairo, Egypt

Pahor Labib (Coptic: Ⲡⲁϩⲱⲣ Ⲗⲁⲡⲓⲡ; Arabic: باهور لبيب Bahur Labib; 19 September 1905 at Ain Shams, Cairo – 7 May 1994) was Director of the Coptic Museum, Cairo, Egypt, from 1951 to 1965 and one of the world leaders in Egyptology and Coptology.

== Early life and education ==
Labib was born in 1905 in Cairo. His father was Claudius Labib, also an Egyptologist and Coptologist who was one of the first Egyptians to learn Hieroglyphics from the French Egyptologists in Egypt and who compiled a Coptic-Arabic dictionary. He grew up in Ain Shams, a suburb of Cairo, where his father had a house with a few acres of land (13 "feddans") that were used to cultivate fruits and vegetables.

For preparatory school Labib went to the "Great Coptic School" and then to Khedivieh Secondary School, both in Cairo. After Labib received his "Bachaloria", he entered the Faculty of Law. However, the Faculty of Archeology had recently opened and he joined this as well. At the final year, exams for both studies clashed, so he choose to sit the Archeology final which he passed with distinction.

Labib was sent for higher studies to Berlin, Germany in 1930. He obtained his Ph.D. degree from the Frederick William University in 1934. The subject of his doctoral degree was King Ahmose I, founder of the Eighteenth Dynasty, who expelled the Hyksos from Egypt. Labib showed that the Hyksos stayed in Egypt for 150 years (previously suggested periods were much longer) and that they came from Canaan. He was the first Egyptian to obtain a doctorate in Egyptology. His teachers in Germany included Herman Grapow (with whom he stayed in touch till the latter's death in 1967) and Kurt Heinrich Sethe.

== Career ==
Labib returned to Egypt and was appointed Lecturer in the Institute of Archeology at Cairo University in 1935. In 1945 he obtained the post of Keeper at the Egyptian Museum, Cairo. He was later appointed director of the provincial museums, during which period he established a few museums around the country, and expanded the Aswan Museum. He was instrumental in transferring the Ismaila Museum from the Suez Canal Company to the administration of the Department of Antiquity. In 1951, he was appointed Director of the Coptic Museum, a post he kept until retiring in 1965.

Labib was chosen as acting director of the Egyptian Museum in the summer of 1964 to investigate the disappearance of a piece of Tutankhamun's treasures. He remained acting director of the Egyptian Museum for a year.

During his directorship of the Coptic Museum he turned the museum into a world-famous research centre for Coptic Studies. He was one of the first to use the word "Coptology". Labib started the excavations in Abu Mena, Western Desert in 1951. Through his contacts, he managed to build a rest house that was spacious and well furnished (built by the German Archeological Institute, Cairo). Pope Cyril VI of Alexandria used to visit the place and even stayed there, to hold an early service in the site of the ancient Cathedral of Saint Menas. Later Pope Cyril VI of Alexandria started the building of the Monastery of Saint Mina. Labib was also involved with excavations in "Tel-Atrib", near the city of Banha in Lower Egypt; the site of a great Cathedral before the Arab invasion. Pope Shenouda III had an interest in and visited the site of these excavations.

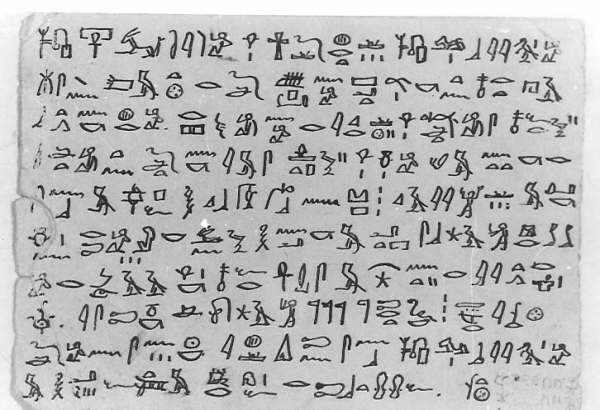
Pahor Labib was one of the world leaders in the Coptic language. He was also well versed in hieroglyphs. Above shows a postcard in hieroglyphs from Professor Herman Grapow to his student Pahor Labib sent in 1932

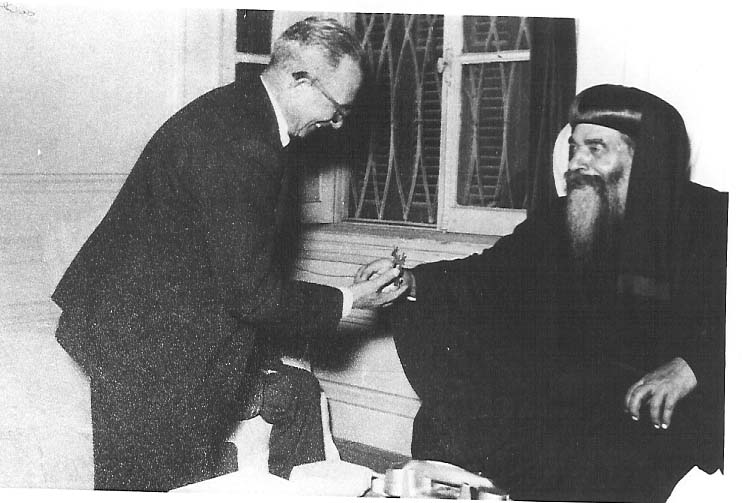
Pope Cyril VI of Alexandria with Pahor Labib in the 1960s

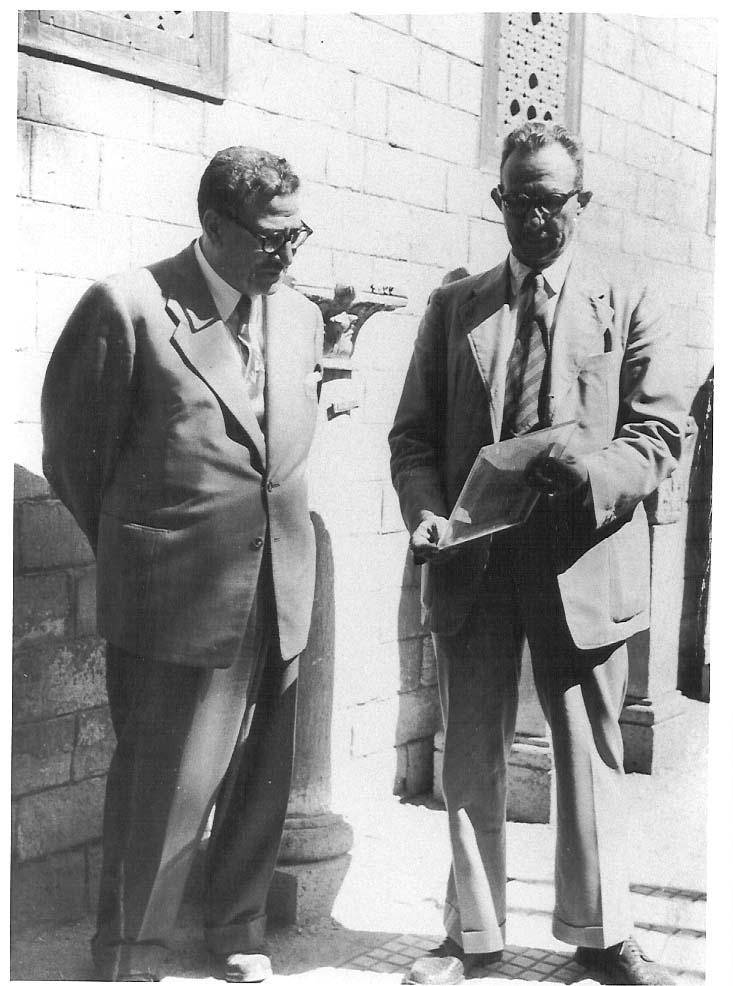
Pahor Labib with Henry Kissinger in the Coptic Museum, Labib showing a page of the Nag Hammadi Library preserved in special glass.

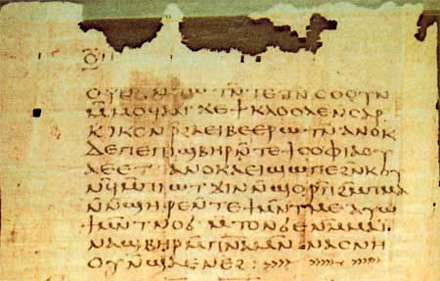
Nag Hammadi texts

Labib also contributed to the study of the Nag Hammadi texts. Translating these texts was a mammoth task as the Coptic language encountered was also dealing with philosophy. UNESCO had an interest in these texts and established an international committee to translate and publish this work. Labib was a secretary, vice president, and president of this committee. The first publication of part of the collection was by him in 1956. Publications of the translated manuscripts carried on until 1984. Labib believed that this philosophy is Egyptian in origin (rather than Greek) and presented a paper on the subject to the First International Congress of Coptology in Cairo in 1976.

A Coptic exhibition was held in Villa Hegel in Essen (West Germany) in 1963 to which Labib was an invited guest.

Labib served on many committees both nationally and internationally owing to his expertise in many fields. In the national arena he served on dozens of committees including the highest in the land to award the most prestigious awards in Arts and Social Sciences in the country. He also served on many committees for Archeology and Tourism, including one for Coptic Tourism. Labib further served on the management boards of the Coptic and Islamic Museums in Cairo and on the council for "Greater Cairo". He was a council member of the Coptic Archeology Institute and a founding member of the Institute of Coptic Studies and La Societe de Saint Minas Le Miraculeux.

Labib was a founding member and President of the National Society of Art and served on the Council of the Society "Des Amis des Arts".

Labib taught at the University, both Egyptology and Coptic Language, especially the Hieroglyphic origins of Coptic words. His knowledge in both languages, with all their dialects and variations, was outstanding.

Labib was a member of the German Institute of Archeology, Berlin, and the Archeology Institute of the University of Prague, and the UNESCO Committee for Museums.

== Awards ==
Labib was awarded the Decoration of the High Cross from Germany in 1976. Following a visit by Princess Margrethe II of Denmark to the Coptic Museum in 1963, he was awarded the World Decoration of Denmark. Also, Emperor Haile Selassie I of Ethiopia awarded Labib a Gold Medal following a visit to the museum in 1959. From 1976–1994 he was an Honorary President of the International Association for Coptic Studies.

On the occasion of Labib's 70th birthday, the Committee of the Nag Hammadi Library organized a special celebration and published a book in his honor, to which twenty-one international distinguished Coptologists contributed.

== Books ==
- Glimpses of ancient Egyptian studies, 1947 (in Arabic). ·
- "HUR MOHEB" Legislation, with Soofi Abu Taleb, 1972 (in Arabic).
- Glimpses of Minute Arts & Artifacts of Egyptian Antiquities, with Moh'd Hammad, 1962 (in Arabic).
- A Guide to the Coptic Museum, 1955 (in English).
- The Coptic Museum and the Babylon Fortress in Old Cairo, with Victor Girgis, 1975 (in English).
- Coptic Art (issue 118 of "Your Book" series), 1978 (in Arabic) (ISBN 977-247-231-7).
- Coptic Gnostic Papyri in the Coptic Museum, Vol I, Government Press, Cairo, 1956 (in English).
- Nag Hammadi Codices III, 2 and IV, 2: The Gospel of the Egyptians (The Holy Book of the Great Invisible Spirit) [Coptic Gnostic Library; Nag Hammadi Studies IV]. by Alexander and Frederik Wisse eds. with Pahor Labib (Author), 1975 (ISBN B001KZBSZ0).

== See also ==
- Lists of Egyptians
- List of Copts

== Sources ==
- Pahor Cladios Labib, Die Herrschaft der Hyksos in Agypten und ihr Sturz, Friedrich Wilhelms Universitat zu Berlin, Glückstadt-Hamburg-New York, 1936.
- Martin Krause, Essays on the Nag Hammad Texts – In Honour of Pahor Labib, Brill, Leiden, 1975 (ISBN 90-04-04363-2).
- Makary Ermanious, Ahmes Pahor and Victor Girgis, Dr Pahor Labib: 1905–1994, Watani, 19 June 1994 (In Arabic).
- Wassif Boutros-Ghali, In Memoriam Pahor Labib (1905–1994), Bulletin de la Société d'Archéologie Copte, Tome XXXIV (1995), Le Caire, pp. 181–82.
- Ahmes Labib Pahor, Professeur Pahor Labib: L'Homme et sa Vie (1905–1994), Le Monde Copte, 1997, 263-272.
- Ahmes Labib Pahor, Dr Pahor Labib: Egyptologist: Struggle and Success, Egypt, 2009 (In Arabic) [Catalogue number in Egyptian National Library and Archives 7633/2009] ISBN 977-17-6848-4.
