= Labib =

Labib (Arabic: لبيب) is a masculine Arabic name. Notable people with the name include:

== Given name ==
- Labib Habachi (1906–1984), Egyptian Egyptologist
- Labib Hussein Abu Rokan (1911–1989), Israeli politician
- Labiba Hashim (1882–1952), Lebanese novelist
- Labib al-Fata al-Saqlabi (1009/1010 – 1039/1040), founder and first ruler of the Taifa of Tortosa
- Labib Mahmoud (1907–?), Egyptian footballer
- Labib Hasso (1925–?), Iraqi Olympic sprinter

== Surname ==
- Adel Labib, Egyptian politician
- Claudius Labib (1868–1918), Egyptologist
- Lotfy Labib (1947–2025), Egyptian actor
- Mahmoud Labib (born 2005), Egyptian footballer
- Pahor Labib (1905–1994), Egyptian Egyptologist

== Other ==
- Labib (mascot), the former official mascot of the environment in Tunisia
