= Philoxenite =

Late antique port town in northern Egypt

- Φιλοξενίτης (Ancient Greek)
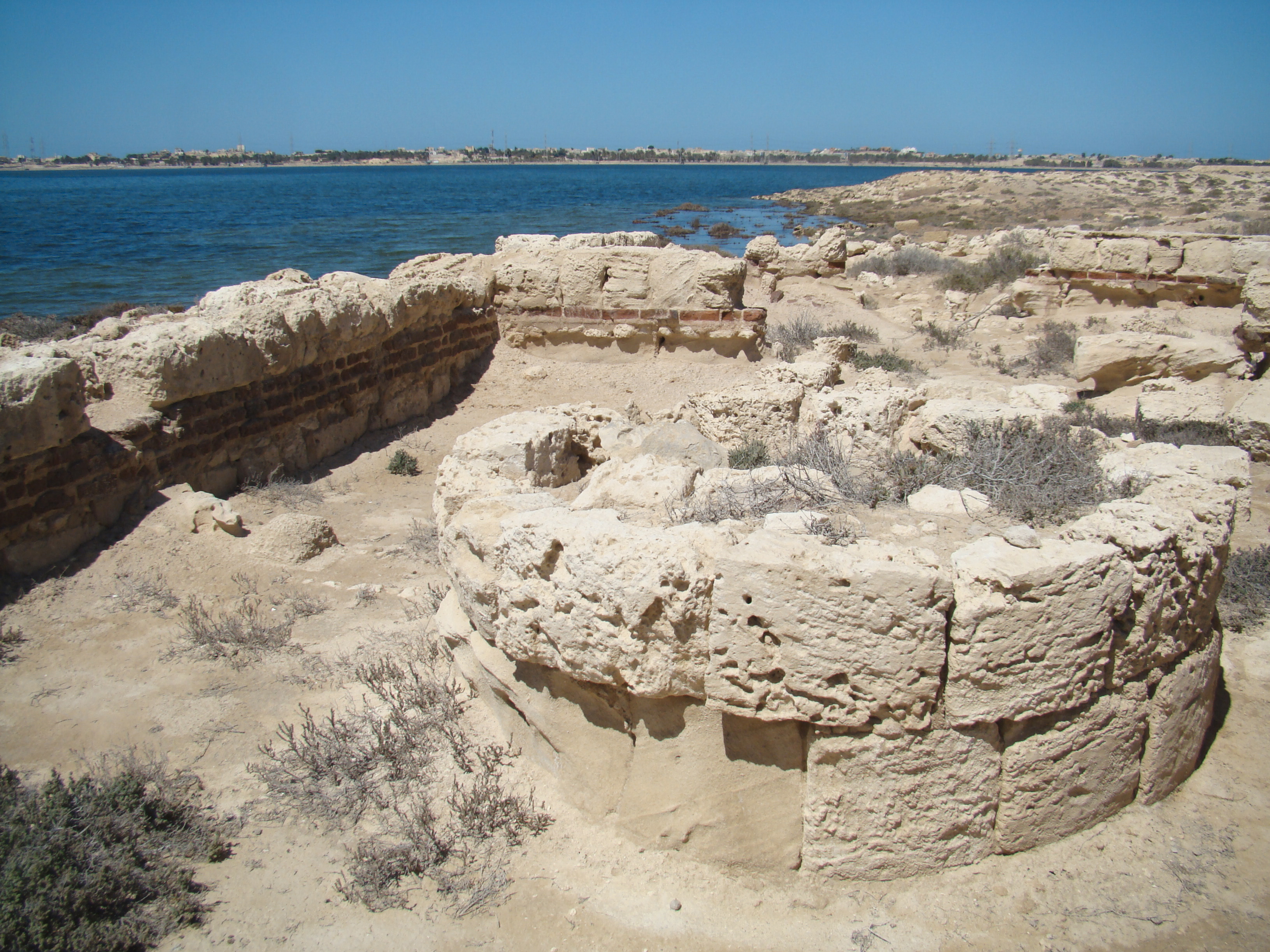

- Location within Egypt
- 30°59′38.2″N 29°39′24.1″E
- Type: settlement
- Periods: Byzantine and early Islamic periods
- Location: Ḥawwārīya, Egypt
- Region: Alexandria Governorate

History
- Built: mid-6th century AD

Site notes
- Area: 11 ha (27 acres)
- Condition: In ruins

Philoxenite was a Late Antique settlement located on the shores of Lake Mariout, near modern Ḥawwārīya, Egypt. Established in the mid-6th century AD during the reign of Byzantine emperor Justinian I, it functioned as a planned urban center built to facilitate Christian pilgrimage between Alexandria and the monastic complex of Abu Mena. Built on the ruins of an earlier Roman settlement, Philoxenite featured modular construction, with rest houses, depositories, porticos, baths, an agora, and a port serving both religious and commercial functions. It is regarded as a unique example of Byzantine urban planning.

== Location ==
Philoxenite was constructed on the southern shore of Lake Mariout, approximately 21 kilometres (13 mi) from Alexandria and 17 kilometres (11 mi) from Abu Mena. The latter was the largest pilgrimage center in the Byzantine world, dedicated to the Christian martyr Menas of Egypt.

== History ==
Philoxenite is referenced in the Encomium of Saint Menas, a Byzantine-era text that describes its construction under Justinian I (r. 527–565 CE) as a center for pilgrims travelling to Abu Mena, which had begun developing two centuries earlier, in the 4th century AD. Excavations confirm that construction began in the mid-6th century AD, with imported pottery found in its earliest foundation layers. Built on the ruins of a Roman-era settlement, the town was reportedly financed by Philoxenos, a prominent figure in Byzantine politics under Anastasius, Justin I, and Justinian. In addition to facilitating the mass pilgrimage to Abu Mena, the town also functioned as a commercial port that participated in regional trade, as evidenced by ostraca indicating the export of local goods.

Unlike other pilgrimage hubs that expanded gradually, Philoxenite was designed as a single, coordinated project, likely overseen by imperial architects from Alexandria. This planned endeavor is unique in the Byzantine world, and stands out as one of the few purpose-built Christian settlements of the Early Byzantine period.

The settlement remained active after the Arab conquest and into the early Islamic period (7th–8th centuries AD). Even after Abu Mena's decline as a pilgrimage center, Philoxenite continued to be a functioning town, with evidence of agricultural activity and irrigation systems suggesting a degree of economic self-sufficiency.

== Archaeology ==
Excavations at Philoxenite have uncovered a highly structured urban design, with a significant portion of the settlement built using modular architecture. The settlement spanned around 11 hectares, featuring churches, a central street, piers and boardwalks built on the waterfront, and public facilities (including baths and latrines). Also located at the site were an agora, depositories, bakeries and a hospital. The town's northern sector, close to the lake and covering about 5 hectares, featured a structured array of modular buildings, while the southern part displayed a less structured layout, influenced by the natural terrain.

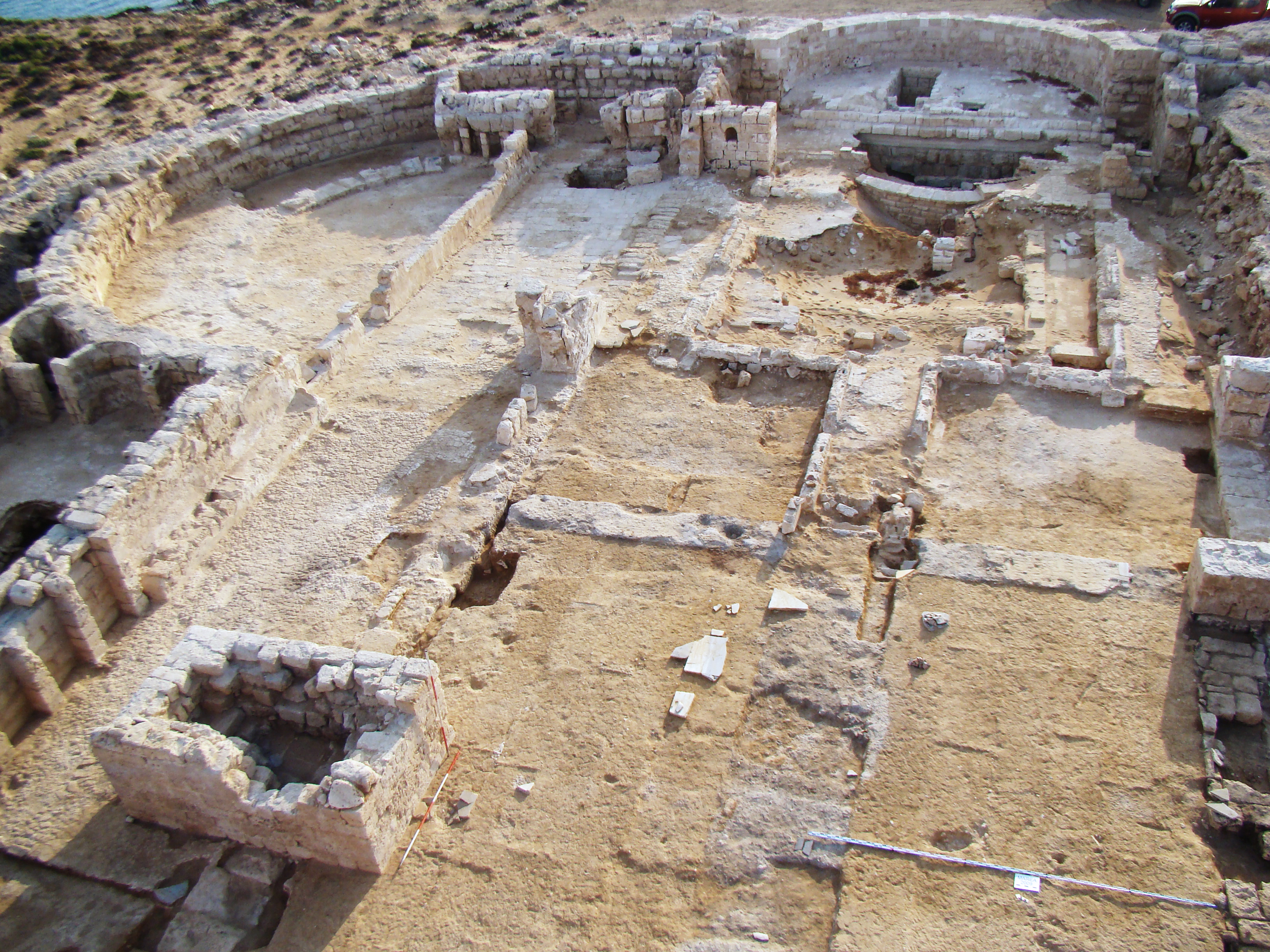
Basilica

Notable structures include: a rectangular complex constructed with limestone pseudo-ashlars in an opus isodomum style, which was divided into separate units, each with a staircase to an upper floor, possibly serving as accommodation or storage spaces (Building S3); Long, narrow structures separated by streets, following standardized layouts similar to Roman-era markets and warehouses (in Areas W1 and W5); and a dual bathhouse with two identical frigidaria, possibly designed for gender segregation, mirroring the great bath built by Justinian at Abu Mena (Bath Complex T2).
