= Monastery of Saint Minas of Kes =

Armenian Monastery in Turkey

Monastery of Saint Minas of Kes ԿԵՍԻ Սբ. Մինաս վանք
- Location within Turkey

Religion
- Affiliation: Armenian Apostolic Church
- Region: Eastern Anatolia region
- Status: Ceased functioning as a monastery in 1915

Location
- Location: (Turkey) Erzurum
- Coordinates: 39.8252°N 41.1921°E

Architecture
- Style: Armenian
- Completed: 1790

The Monastery of Saint Minas is a former Armenian monastery in eastern Turkey which has been in use until the Armenian genocide. It's a dome-less basilica with columns (very common for Armenian churches constructed in the 19th century). Located at the western edge of Gezköy village of Erzurum province in Turkey now. The village of Gezköy (formerly known as "Kes") is about 9 km west of the centre of the city of Erzurum.

== Etymology ==
Saint Minas the Martyr and Thaumaturgy is one of the saints of the Armenian-Gregorian church that corresponds to Saint Minas in the other Christian churches.
Toponym "Kes" (Armenian: Կես) in Armenian is for "half", which was a former (historical) name of the village of Gezköy, which in Turkish means "eye-village".

== History ==
At the begin of the 19th century there were some 100 Armenian-populated villages in the Erzurum plain - by the end of the century that number had been reduced to around 50. The brief Russian liberation of parts from the Ottoman Empire during the 1828-29 Russo-Turkish War resulted in an exodus of some 10,000 Armenian families, an estimated 75,000 people, mostly from Erzurum province, who accompanied the withdrawing Russian forces into Russian territory. There was a further flight of the region's native Armenian population into Russian-controlled territory after the Crimean War of 1853-56, and the Russo-Turkish War of 1877-78, when Russian forces again captured Erzurum. In the decade before the 1915 genocide, the village of Kes had 1,103 Armenian inhabitants (comprising 144 households) and 170 Muslim inhabitants. Kes also had a school with 100 students. The village church in Kez was called Surp Minas. It had been built in 1790, but had probably replaced an older building because the date 1740 appeared on a khatchkar set into a wall of the church.

== Current condition ==
The monastery still stands, however in a poor state. An encroaching development may mean it will be destroyed however.
