= Labit =

Labit is a surname. Notable people with the surname include:

- Christian Labit (born 1971), French rugby union player
- Laurent Labit (born 1973), French rugby union player

== See also ==
- Georges Labit Museum, archaeological museum located in Toulouse, France
- Labib
