= Church of Saint Menas (Cairo) =

Coptic Orthodox church in Egypt

Monastery of Saint Menas
- Location within Egypt
- Interactive map of Monastery of Saint Menas

Monastery information
- Other name: Deir Mar Mina
- Established: Sixth century
- Dedication: Saint Menas
- Diocese: Coptic Orthodox Diocese of Old Cairo, Manial and Fum Al-Khalig

Site
- Location: Fum al-Khalig, Cairo
- Country: Egypt
- Coordinates: 30°00′23″N 31°13′54″E
- Public access: Yes

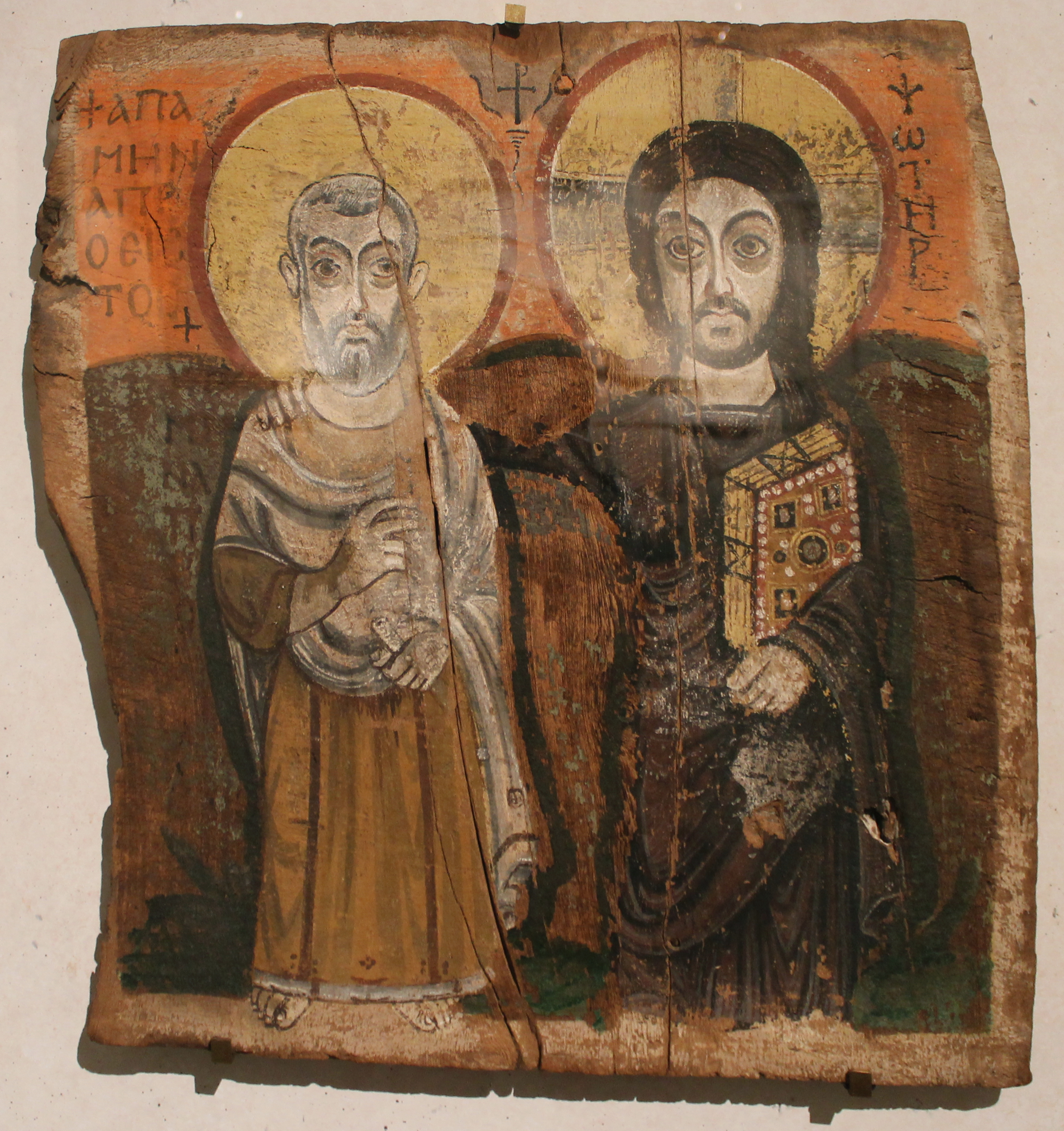
Christ and Saint Menas, 6th-century Coptic icon, Louvre

The Coptic Orthodox Church of Saint Menas (Egyptian Arabic: كنيسة مارمينا kenīset Mar-Mīna) is a Coptic Orthodox church near Coptic Cairo and is one of the oldest Coptic churches in Egypt, dating back to the sixth century.

== Geographic significance ==
St. Menas church is on the north end of Coptic Cairo, located in a region known as Fum al-Khalig (fomm el-ḵalīg), north of the Roman aqueduct and the famed Babylon Fortress, at a Christian cemetery in the north end of Old Cairo.

Fum al Khalig is technically north of Old Cairo, however, it is still under the Coptic Orthodox Diocese of Old Cairo, Manial and Fum Al-Khalig.

Fum al Khalig is also known as Al-Hamra (el-ḥamra; literally: "the red one" in Egyptian Arabic). The Coptic Orthodox Diocese encompasses El-Hamra as well as Coptic Cairo. St. Menas Church is still very near to the ancient Churches of Old Cairo, and is likely the first Coptic Orthodox Church in Cairo aside from several Churches that were all in the Old Cairo area at the time. Not only is it evidence of the past existence of Coptic Orthodox Christianity in Cairo outside of the Old City (being close to the northern tip of the district), but it is also one of few surviving pieces and large remnants of Coptic architecture that remains to this day.

== History ==
St. Mena's Church is, along with the UNESCO World Heritage site of Abu Mena, one of the best recognized architectural elements that are named after St. Mena. Having been established in the 6th century, it is also one of the oldest churches in Egypt. In the eighth century, it is said that the church of Sain was destroyed during the reign of caliph Hisham Ibn Abdel Malik Ibn Marwan, and rebuilt soon afterwards.

In 1164 AD, the Church was renovated again. Pillars were constructed for the purpose of replacing the marble columns. These same masonry pillars, which still exist in the present, separate the nave from the aisles with six on each side.

== Modernity ==
Today, only sections of the central sanctuary and the outer wall remain from the 8th-century building. The church is divided into many sanctuaries, nave and aisles. Tourists can see depiction of the Holy Coptic Bible from the walls of the church. The current building measures about 20.5 by 15 meters and stands 13.5 meters high.

St. Mena's relics were formerly kept in this church, however, most of these relics were transferred to the famous Monastery of St. Mina in Mariut (near Alexandria) in 1962. The only remaining ones are kept in the narthex of the church. On the southern sanctuary, there is shrine that contains a number of beautiful icons embroidered in the Coptic style.

== Terrorist incident ==
On 29 December 2017, the church was attacked by Islamist militants. Police noticed two men behaving suspiciously, who fired on the police when challenged. Three police officers, one of the attackers and seven other people died. The dead attacker was found to have been wearing an explosive belt. The other attacker was subsequently arrested. About an hour later, a nearby Coptic-owned shop was also attacked, with another two deaths.

== See also ==
- Christian Egypt
- List of Coptic Orthodox churches in Egypt
