= Monastery of Saint Mina =

Monastery in the Western Desert in Egypt

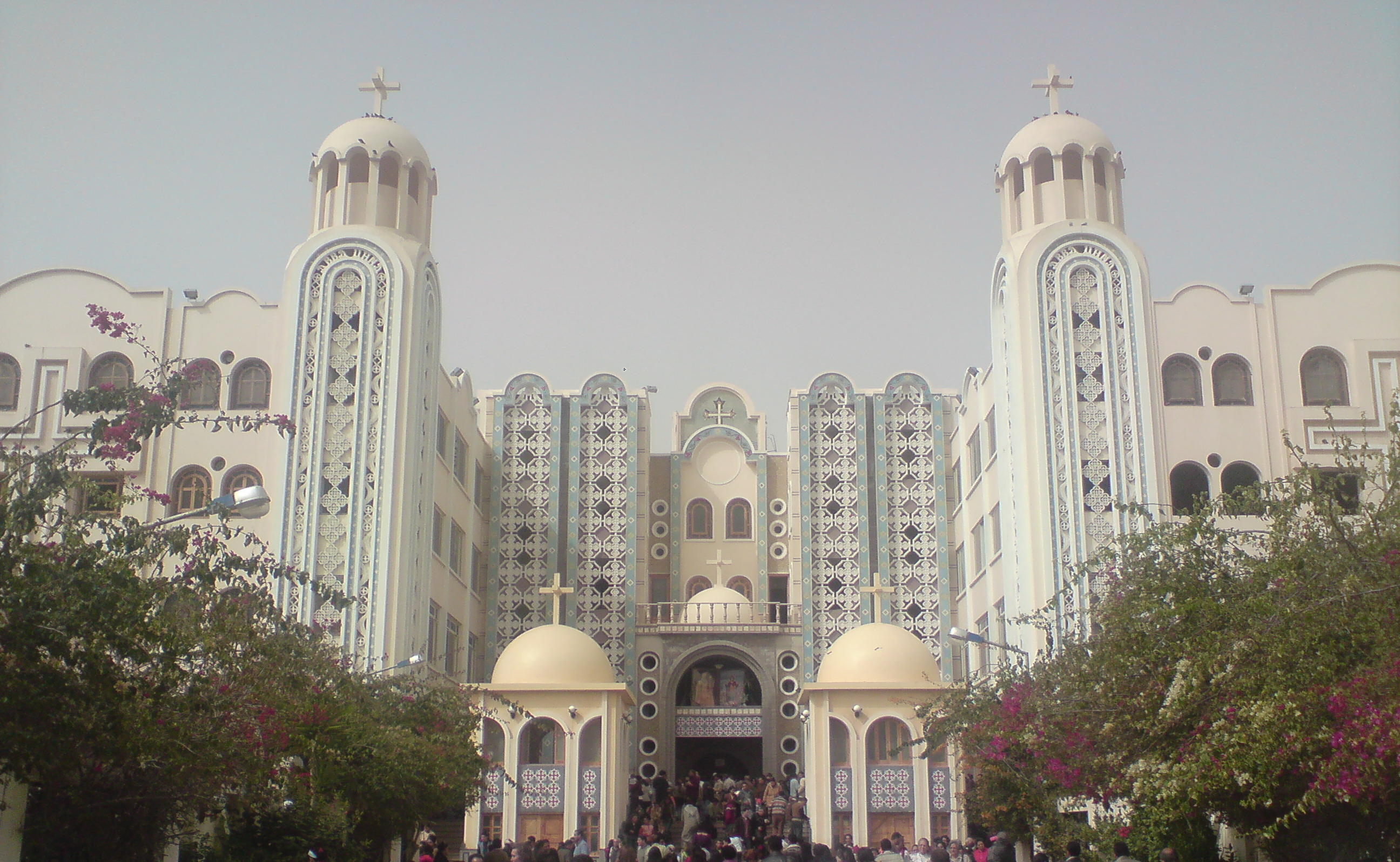

- Location within Egypt

Monastery information
- Other name: Deir Mari Mina
- Established: 1959
- Dedication: Saint Menas
- Diocese: Coptic Orthodox Church of Alexandria

People
- Founder: Pope Cyril VI of Alexandria
- Important associated figures: Bishop Mina Ava-Mina

Site
- Location: Mariut, Alexandria
- Country: Egypt
- Coordinates: 31°9′11″N 29°53′55″E
- Public access: Yes

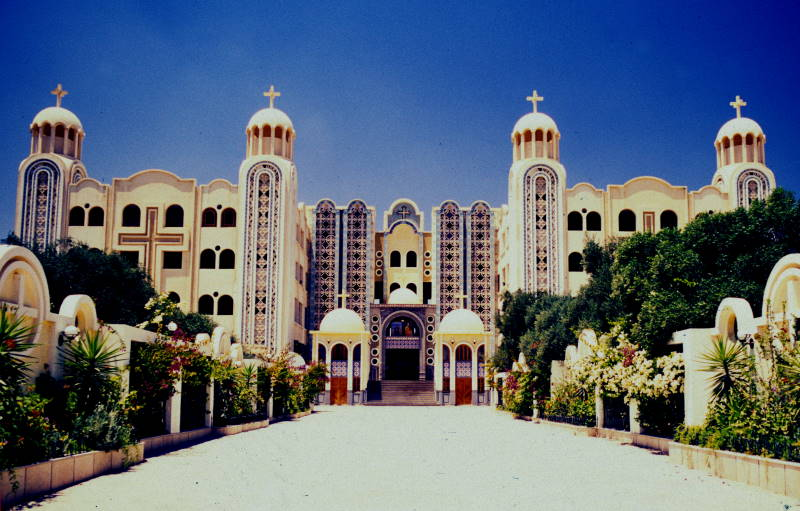
Today, thousands of pilgrims continue to flock from all over the world to receive spiritual and physical healing at the revived monastery, which has once again become the "Lourdes of the East".

The Monastery of Saint Mina is a monastery of the Coptic Orthodox Church of Alexandria located in the Western Desert near Alexandria. It is dedicated to Saint Menas. The modern monastery is built close to the ruins of Abu Mena, the original pilgrimage site dating from the mid-7th century.

== History ==
Following the execution of Saint Mina, his sister brought his body to a church in Alexandria. When the time of persecution ended, during the papacy of Pope Athanasius of Alexandria, an angel appeared to the Pope and ordered him to load the saint's body on a camel and head towards the Western Desert. At a certain spot near a water well at the end of Lake Mariout, not far from Alexandria, the camel stopped and wouldn't move. The Christians took this a sign from God and there buried Saint Mina's body after placing it in a silver coffin. The coffin was later placed inside decay-resistant wood and buried at the same location.

Most versions of the story state that the location of the tomb was then forgotten until its miraculous rediscovery by a local shepherd. A shepherd was feeding his sheep in that location, and a sick lamb fell on the ground. As it struggled to get on its feet again, its scab was cured. The story spread quickly and the sick who came to this spot recovered from whatever illnesses they had just by lying on the ground. The Ethiopian Synaxarium describes Constantine I sending his sick daughter to the shepherd to be cured, and credits her with finding Mina's body, after which Constantine ordered the construction of a church at the site. Some versions of the story replace Constantine with the late-5th century emperor Zeno, but archaeologists have dated the original foundation to the late 4th century. According to the Zeno version, his daughter was leprous and his advisors suggested that she should try that place, and she did. At night Saint Mina appeared to the girl and informed her that his body was buried in that place. The following morning, Zeno's daughter was cured and she related her vision about the saint to her servants. Zeno immediately ordered Mina's body to be dug out and a cathedral to be built there.

A large city was also built there and named after the saint. Sick people from all over the world used to visit that city and were healed through the intercessions of Saint Mina, who became known as the Wonders' Maker. Today, numerous little clay bottles on which the saint's name and picture are engraved are found by archeologists in diverse countries around the Mediterranean world, such as Heidelberg in Germany, Milan in Italy, Dalmatia in Croatia, Marseille in France, Dongola in Sudan, and the holy city of Jerusalem. Visitors would buy these bottles, usually containing oil or water for blessing, and take them back to their relatives.

== Destruction of the city of Saint Mina ==
The city of Saint Mina was destroyed during the Arab invasion of Egypt in the seventh century (source needed.) The cathedral was also damaged. The remains of the city was listed as a UNESCO World Heritage Site. Recent agricultural efforts in the area have led to a significant rise in the water table, which has caused a number of the site's buildings to collapse or become unstable. The site was added to the list of threatened World Heritage Sites in 2001 and removed from the list in 2025.

== The New Monastery and Cathedral of Saint Mina ==
As soon as Pope Cyril VI of Alexandria became Pope and Patriarch on Saint Mark's Throne in 1959, he began to put the foundations for a great monastery close to the remains of the old city. Pope Cyril VI had a particular relationship to Saint Mina and venerated him as his personal patron saint. The first abbot of the modern monastery was the late Mina Ava-Mina, a well-respected figure within the Coptic community. Today, the Monastery of Saint Mina is one of the most famous monasteries in Egypt. The relics of Saint Mina, as well as that of Pope Cyril VI of Alexandria lie in this monastery.

== Abbot ==
As of 2003 Kyrillos (Cyril) was the bishop and abbot of the Monastery of Saint Mina.

== See also ==
- Church of Saint Menas (Cairo)
