= Claudius Labib =

Coptic (Egyptian) Egyptologist

Claudius Iohannes Labib Bey
- ⲕⲗⲁⲩⲇⲓⲟⲥ ⲓⲱϩⲁⲛⲛⲏⲥ ⲗⲁⲃⲓⲃ
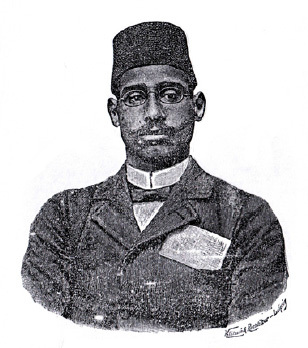
- Image of Labib from his "Lexicon of Egyptian language"
- Born: 6 January 1868; Meir, Asyut, Asyut Governorate, Khedivate of Egypt
- Died: 9 May 1918 (aged 55)
- Other names: Iqladiyus Labib
- Education: Patriarchal School in Cairo
- Spouse: Warda
- Children: Two sons (Pahor Labib and Shenouti); Five daughters (Tutu, Nefertari, Tsamon, Money, Hanouf)
- Scientific career
- Fields: Egyptology
- Academic advisors: Arian G. Moftah

Claudius Iohannes Labib (Coptic: ⲕⲗⲁⲩⲇⲓⲟⲥ ⲓⲱϩⲁⲛⲛⲏⲥ ⲗⲁⲃⲓⲃ; 6 January 1868 – 9 May 1918) was a Coptic (Egyptian) Egyptologist. His family was known for copying church books. He used to accompany his father to the el-Muharraq monastery to learn Coptic with the monks. He was the youngest of three brothers, the eldest being Pahor ⲡⲁϩⲱⲣ and the middle being Tadros ⲑⲉⲟⲇⲱⲣⲟⲥ . Labib learned Egyptian hieroglyphs from the French Egyptologists and was the second modern Egyptian to learn this ancient language (the first was Ahmad Kamal and Ahmad Kamal is of Turkish origin). Claudius Labib is credited for making the first Coptic-Arabic Dictionary ⲡⲓⲗⲉⲝⲓⲕⲟⲛ ⲛ̀ϯⲁⲥⲡⲓ ⲛ̀ⲣⲉⲙⲛ̀ⲭⲏⲙⲓ . He died before finishing it (ⲁ-ϧ). Claudius Labib was the chief editor of "On" (Coptic: ⲱⲛ, Heliopolis) magazine which had articles written in Coptic. He also pioneered educational books for children named ⲁϧⲱⲙⲫⲁⲧ (Akhomphat).

Claudius Labib was also responsible for editing a series of religious texts used by the Coptic Orthodox Church. The works were published at Cairo as follows: ⲡⲓⲕⲁⲧⲁⲙⲉⲣⲟⲥ Katamãrus, 1900–02; ⲡⲓⲉⲩⲭⲟⲗⲟⲅⲓⲟⲛ ⲉⲑⲟⲩⲁⲃ Euchologion, 1904; Funeral Service, 1905.
