= Labib (mascot) =

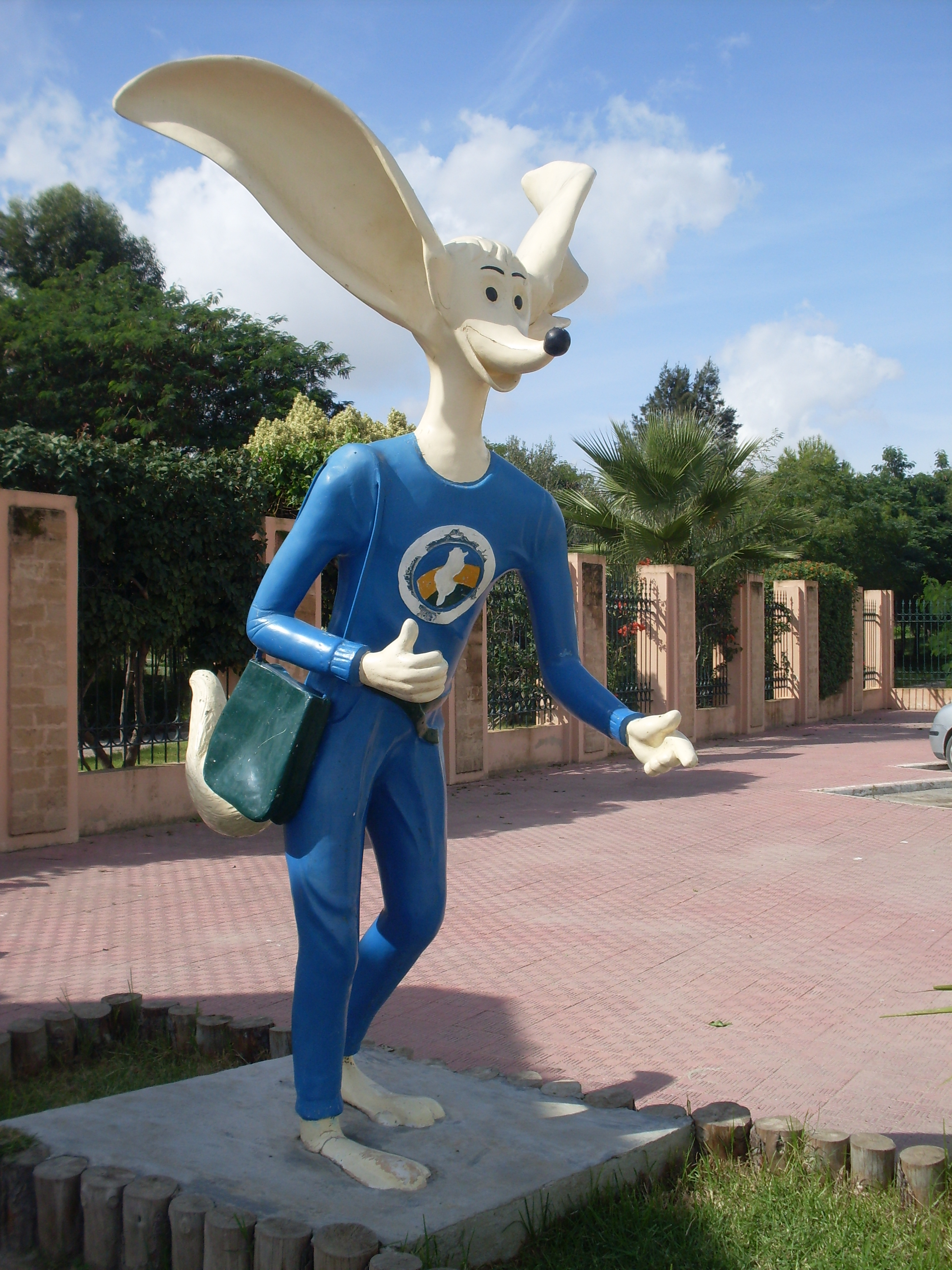
- Statue of Labib in El Mourouj in 2010
- First appearance: 1992
- Last appearance: 13 April 2012
- Created by: Chedly Belkhamsa

In-universe information
- Species: Fennec fox (Vulpes zerda)
- Gender: Male
- Occupation: Official mascot of the environment
- Nationality: Tunisian

Labib (Arabic: لبيب), was the official mascot of the environment in Tunisia from 1992 until 13 April 2012, when the Minister of the Environment, Mémia El Benna, announced the end of its use.

== Controversy ==
During the post-revolution Jebali government, Mémia made the decision to end the use of the official mascot, saying it was too closely tied to the former regime of Zine El Abidine Ben Ali.

On 8 May 2015, the Minister of the Environment Nejib Derouiche announced that a new mascot replace Labib in hopes of decreasing carbon emissions by 67%.

== In popular culture ==
Labib was the subject of a song by the group ZeMeKeN "Ena Esmi Labib" ("My name is Labib").
