= Menas of Egypt =

Egyptian saint and martyr

Saint Menas of Egypt
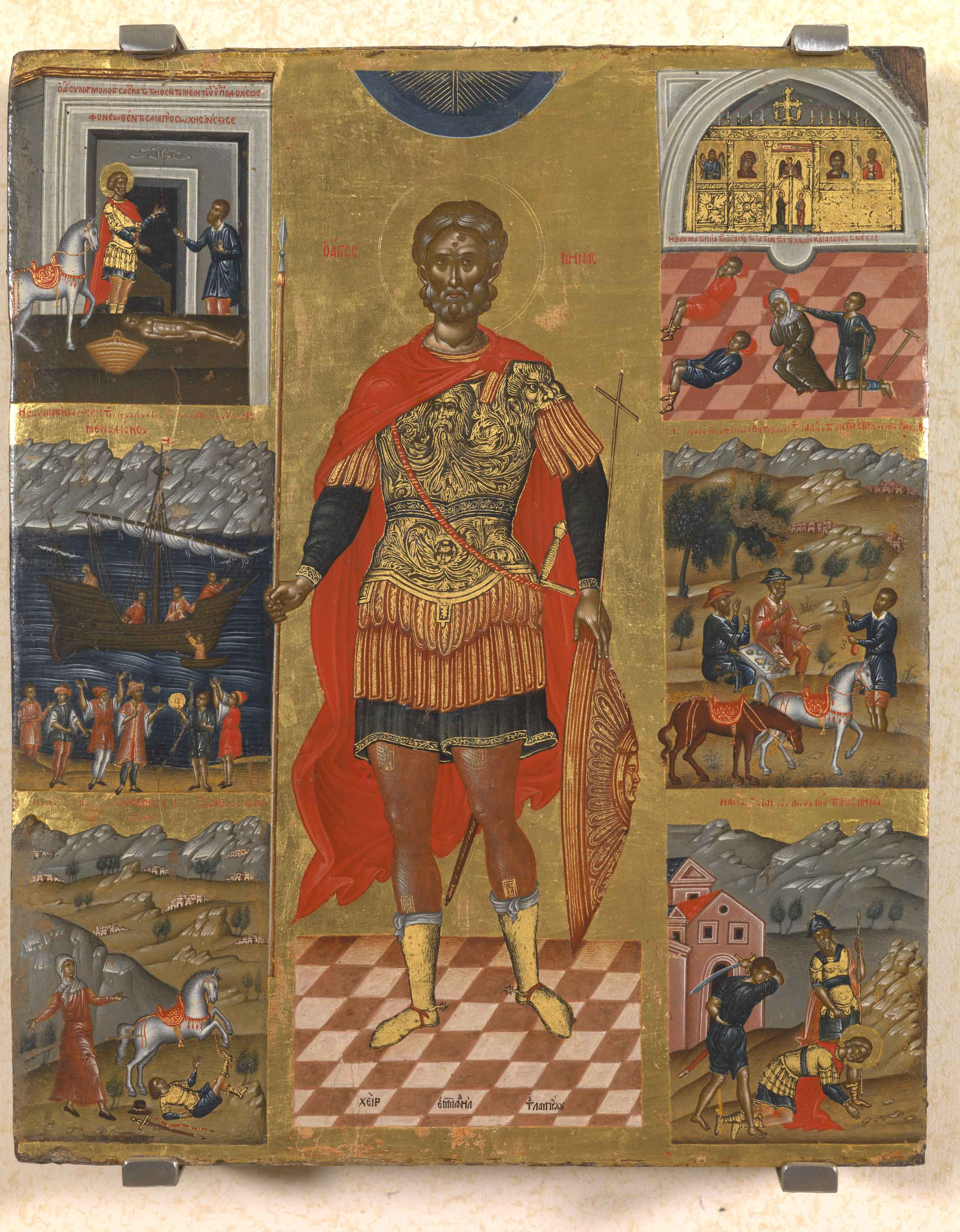
- Icon by Emmanuel Lambardos, 17th century
- Born: 285; Nikiou, Egypt, Roman Empire
- Died: c. 309; Cotyaeum, Anatolia, Roman Empire (modern-day Turkey)
- Venerated in: Oriental Orthodoxy; Eastern Orthodox Church; Catholic Church
- Canonized: Pre-Congregation
- Major shrine: Monastery of Saint Mina; Church of Saint Menas (Cairo)
- Feast: 15, 16 Hathor (Coptic Orthodox Church) (which coincides with 11 November on the Julian Calendar or 24 November on the Gregorian Calendar; 11 November (Eastern Orthodox and Catholic Churches)
- Attributes: Christian Martyrdom, man with his hands cut off and his eyes torn out; man with two camels; young knight with a halberd, an anachronistic depiction of his time in the Roman army
- Patronage: Heraklion
- Controversy: None

Menas of Egypt (285 – c. 309), variously spelled in different traditions, was an Egyptian Christian martyr and wonder-worker now regarded as one of the main Coptic saints due to the many miracles that have been attributed to his intercession and prayers. According to tradition, Menas was a Coptic soldier in the Roman army martyred because he refused to recant his Christian faith.

His feast day is held on November 11 or its Egyptian equivalent, 15 Hathor, in the Coptic Orthodox Church of Alexandria. As the Eastern and Coptic Orthodox churches largely continue to employ the Julian calendar, however, the commemoration is usually held 13 days later on what is reckoned November 24 in the Gregorian calendar.

== Name ==
Menas is the Latin form of the ancient Greek Mēnâs (Μηνᾶς), derived from the Demotic form of the ancient Egyptian name of the god Min (mnw). One tradition, however, credits his mother with naming him after the "amen" she supposedly heard as she prayed for a son.

He is also known as Minas from romanization of the modern Greek form of the name, Minás (Μηνάς), and as Mina, Mena, or Meena from transcriptions of Coptic Mina (ⲙⲏⲛⲁ) and Egyptian Arabic Mīna (مينا).

== Life ==
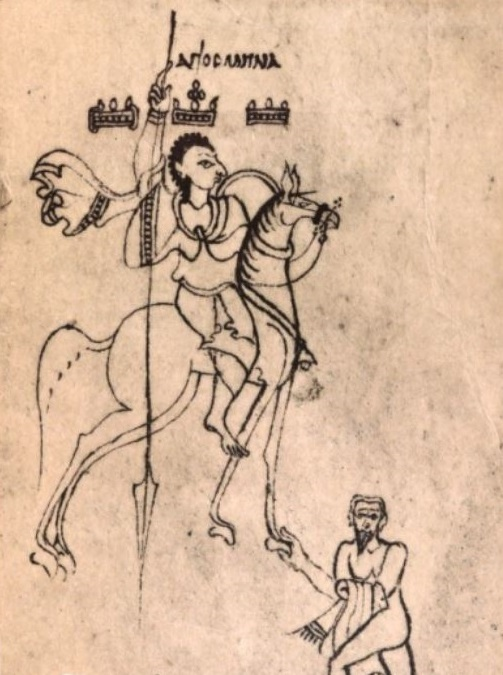
St. Menas and boatman on a Makurian manuscript from c. 1000

There are many sources written in different languages (Koine Greek, Coptic, Old Nubian, Ge'ez, Latin, Syriac, Armenian) relating to Menas.

Menas was born in Egypt in 285 in the city of Nikiou, which lay in the vicinity of Memphis. His parents were ascetic Christians but did not have any children for a long time. His father's name was Eudoxios and his mother's name was Euphemia. On the feast of the Virgin Mary, mother of Jesus, Euphemia was praying with tears before an icon of the Virgin for God to give her a son. A sound came from the icon saying "Amen". A few months later, Euphemia gave birth to a boy and named him Menas.

His father Eudoxios, who ruled one of the administrative divisions of Egypt, died when Menas was fourteen years old. At the age of fifteen Menas joined the Roman army and was given a high rank due to his father's reputation. Most sources state that he served in Cotyaeum in Phrygia, although some say his appointment was in Algeria. Three years later he left the army, in order to devote his whole life to Christ, and headed towards the desert to live a different kind of life.

After spending five years as a hermit, Menas had a revelation of angels crowning martyrs in glory, and longed to join them. While he was thinking about it, he heard a voice saying: "Blessed are you, Menas, because you have been called to the pious life from your childhood. You shall be granted three immortal crowns: one for your celibacy, another for your asceticism, and a third for your martyrdom." Menas then hurried to the ruler, declaring his Christian faith.

== Relics ==
The soldiers who executed Menas set his body on fire for three days but the body remained unharmed. Menas' sister then bribed the soldiers and managed to carry the body away. She embarked on a ship heading to Alexandria, where she placed his body in a church.

When the time of persecution ended, during the papacy of Athanasius of Alexandria the pope had a vision of an angel appearing to him and ordering him to load Menas' body on a camel and head towards the Libyan Desert. At a certain spot near a water well at the end of Lake Mariout, not far from Alexandria, the camel stopped and wouldn't move. The Christians took this a sign from God and buried Menas' body there.

The Berbers of Pentapolis rose against the cities around Alexandria. As the people were getting ready to face them, the Roman governor decided to secretly take the body of Menas with him to be his deliverer and his strong protector. Through Menas' blessings, the governor overcame the Berbers and returned victorious. However, he decided not to return the body to its original place and wanted to take it to Alexandria. On the way back, as they passed by Lake Mariout at the same spot where the body was originally buried, the camel carrying the body knelt down and would not move. People moved the body to another camel, but the second camel would not move either. The governor finally realized that this was God's command. He made a coffin from decay-resistant wood and placed the silver coffin in it.

== Veneration ==
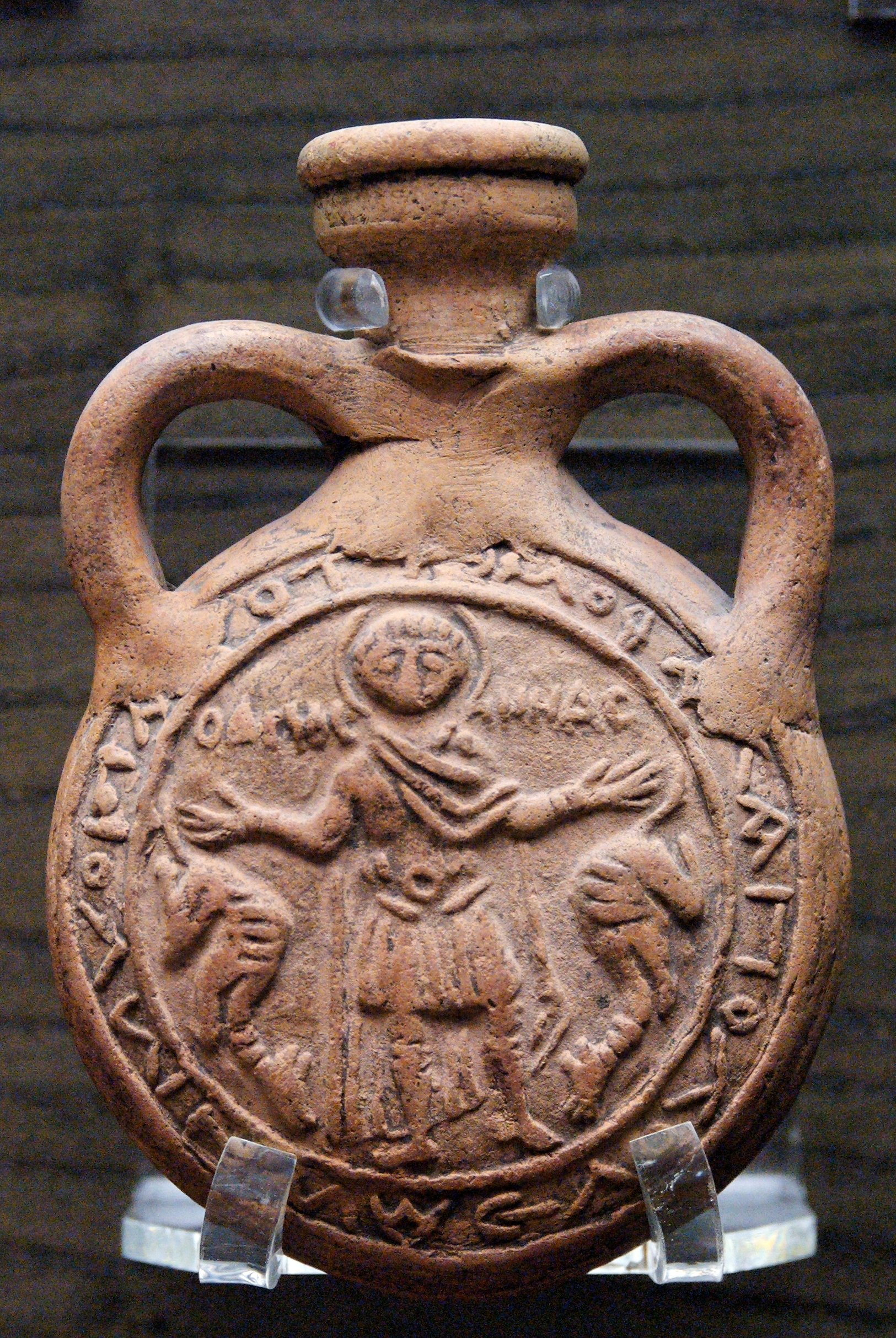
Terracotta pilgrim's Menas flask impressed with Saint Mina between two camels, Byzantine, probably made at Abu Mina, Egypt, c. 6th–7th century. (Louvre Museum)

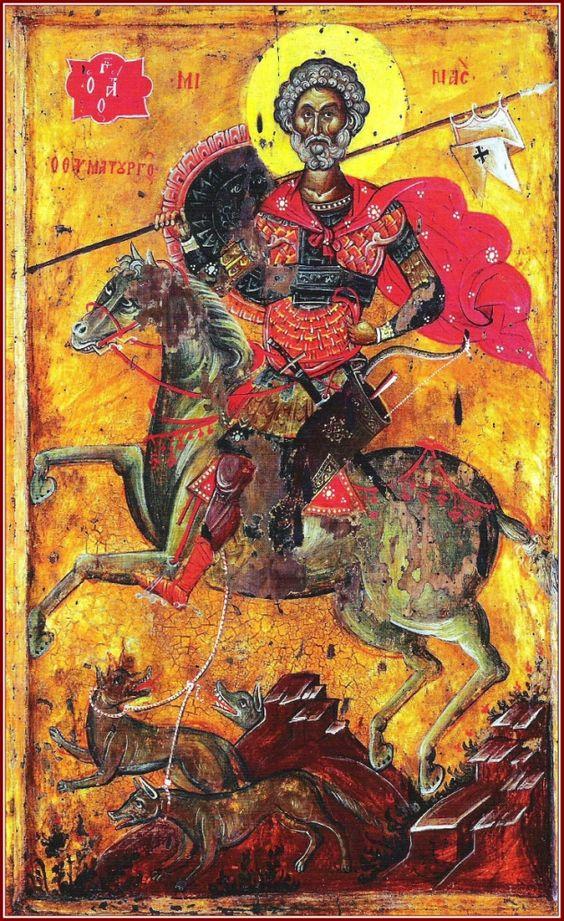
16th century icon of Saint Menas inside the Temple Church in Kastoria, Greece

Most versions of the story state that the location of the tomb was then forgotten until its miraculous rediscovery by a local shepherd. A shepherd was feeding his sheep in that location, and a sick lamb fell on the ground. As it struggled to get on its feet again, its scab was cured. The story spread quickly and the sick who came to this spot recovered from whatever illnesses they had just by lying on the ground. The Ethiopian Synaxarium describes Constantine I sending his sick daughter to the shepherd to be cured, and credits her with finding Menas' body, after which Constantine ordered the construction of a church at the site. Some versions of the story replace Constantine with the late-5th century emperor Zeno, but archaeologists have dated the original foundation to the late 4th century. According to the Zeno version, his daughter was leprous and his advisors suggested that she should try that place, and she did. At night Menas appeared to the girl and informed her that his body was buried in that place. The following morning, Zeno's daughter was cured and she related her vision about the saint to her servants. Zeno immediately ordered Mina's body to be dug out and a cathedral to be built there.

After his martyrdom in the early fourth century, Menas acquired a reputation for miraculous healing powers. The cult of Saint Menas was centered on Abu Mena near Alexandria. Sick people from all over the Christian world used to visit that city and were healed through the intercessions of Menas, who became known as the Wonders' Maker. Today, numerous little clay Menas flasks, or bottles for holy water or oil on which the saint's name and picture are stamped, are found by archeologists in diverse countries around the Mediterranean world, such as Heidelberg in Germany, Milan in Italy, Dalmatia in Croatia, Marseille in France, Dongola in Sudan, Meols (Cheshire) in England, and the holy city of Jerusalem, as well as modern Turkey and Eritrea. Pilgrims would buy these bottles and take them back to their relatives.

=== Patronage ===
Menas is the patron saint of many German and Swiss towns. He was venerated as the protector of pilgrims and merchants. St. Menas is also noted for healing various illnesses.

=== Iconography ===
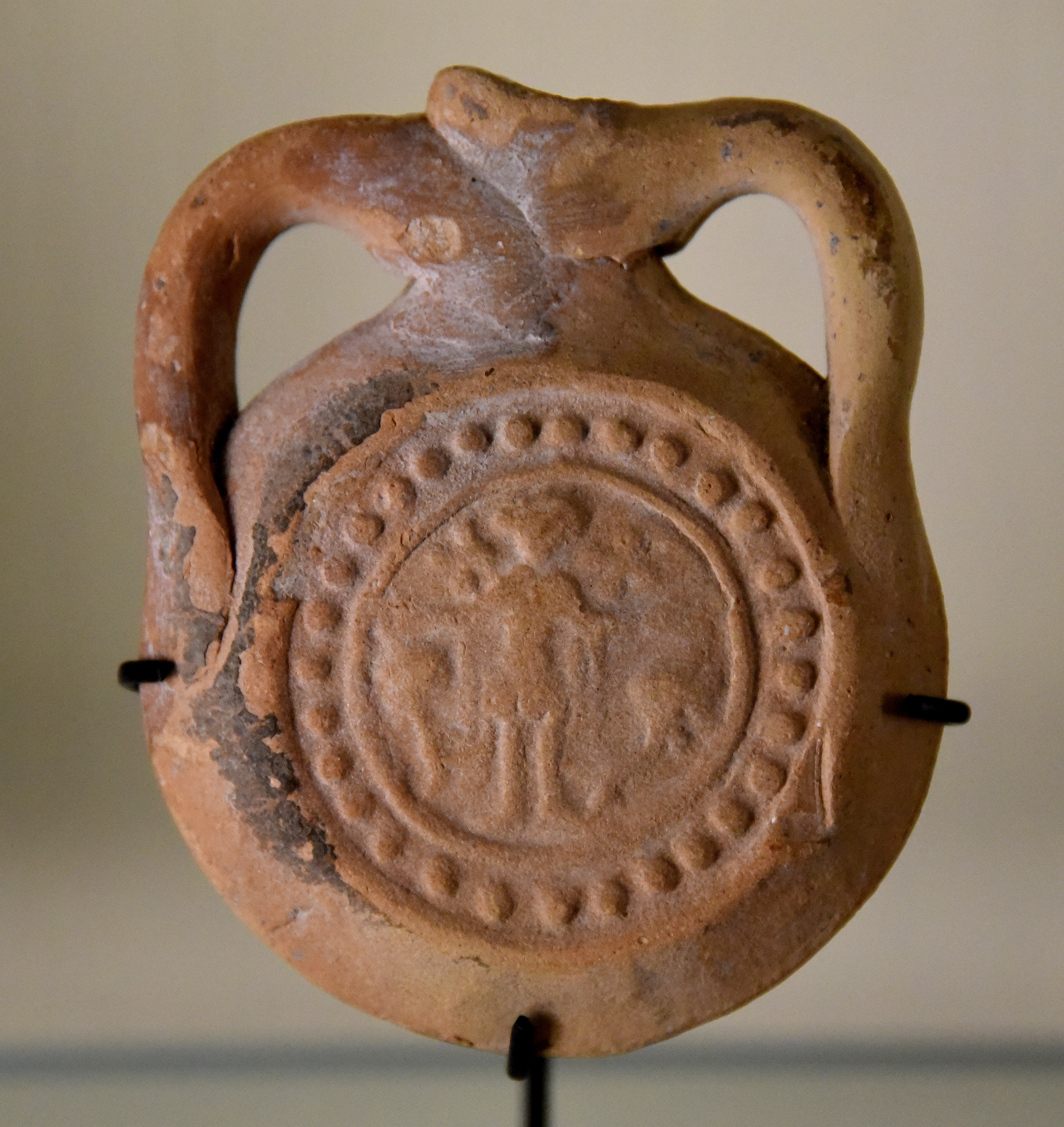
Pottery pilgrim bottle, for storing water from the spring of Saint Menas. Byzantine period. From Alexandria, Egypt. The Petrie Museum of Egyptian Archaeology, London

Menas is generally shown between two camels, the animals that, according to the legend, returned his body to Egypt for burial.

== Military saint ==
Most likely Mina of Mareotis, Mina of Cotyaes, and Mina of Constantinople, are all the same person honored in different places. Menas is sometimes called Mina the Soldier also called the "Wonder worker" in the West, where he is venerated as a military saint.

== New Monastery and Cathedral of Saint Mina ==
As soon as Pope Cyril VI of Alexandria became pope and patriarch on Saint Mark's Throne, he began to put the foundations for a great monastery close to the remains of the old city. Today, the Monastery of Saint Mina is one of the most famous monasteries in Egypt. The relics of Saint Mina, as well as that of Pope Cyril VI of Alexandria lie in this monastery. The cathedral of Saint Mina was destroyed during the Arab invasions of the 7th century.

== El Alamein battle ==
According to Eastern and Oriental Orthodox belief, in June 1942, during the North Africa campaign that was decisive for the outcome of the Second World War, the German forces under the command of General Rommel were on their way to Alexandria, and happened to make a halt near a place which the Arabs call El Alamein. An ancient ruined church nearby in Abu Mena was dedicated to Saint Menas; there some people say he is buried. Here the weaker Allied forces, including some Greeks, confronted the numerically and militarily superior German army, and the result of the coming battle of El Alamein seemed certain. During the first night of engagement, at midnight, Saint Menas came out of his ruined church and appeared in the midst of the German camp at the head of a caravan of camels, exactly as he was shown on the walls of the ruined church in one of the frescoes depicting his miracles. This astounding and terrifying apparition so undermined German morale that it contributed to the brilliant victory of the Allies. Winston Churchill said of this victory: "Now this is not the end. It is not even the beginning of the end, but it is, perhaps, the end of the beginning." He also wrote: "Before Alamein we never had a victory. After Alamein, we never had a defeat.

== See also ==
- Agios Minas Cathedral, Heraklion
- Church of Saint Menas (Cairo)
- Church of Saint Menas of Samatya, Istanbul
- Minas of Aksum
- Monastery of Saint Mina
- Pope Cyril VI of Alexandria
