= Wassef =

Wassef is both a given name and a surname.

Notable people with the given name include:

- Charlotte Wassef (1912–1988), Egyptian beauty queen
- Muna Wassef (born 1942), Syrian Kurdish stage, film and television actress
- Ramses Wissa Wassef (1911–1974), Egyptian architect and professor of art and architecture
- Wadida Wassef (born 1926), Egyptian writer and translator

Notable people with the surname include:

- Wassef Boutros-Ghali (1924-2023), Egyptian architect and painter
- Wassef El Harakeh, Lebanese lawyer and political activist
- Wassef Ali Hassoun (born 1980), United States Marine
- Wassef Hinein, Egyptian Coptic Christian activist

== See also ==
- Ramses Wissa Wassef Art Center, art center near Cairo, Egypt
