= Coptic art =

Egyptian Christian art tradition

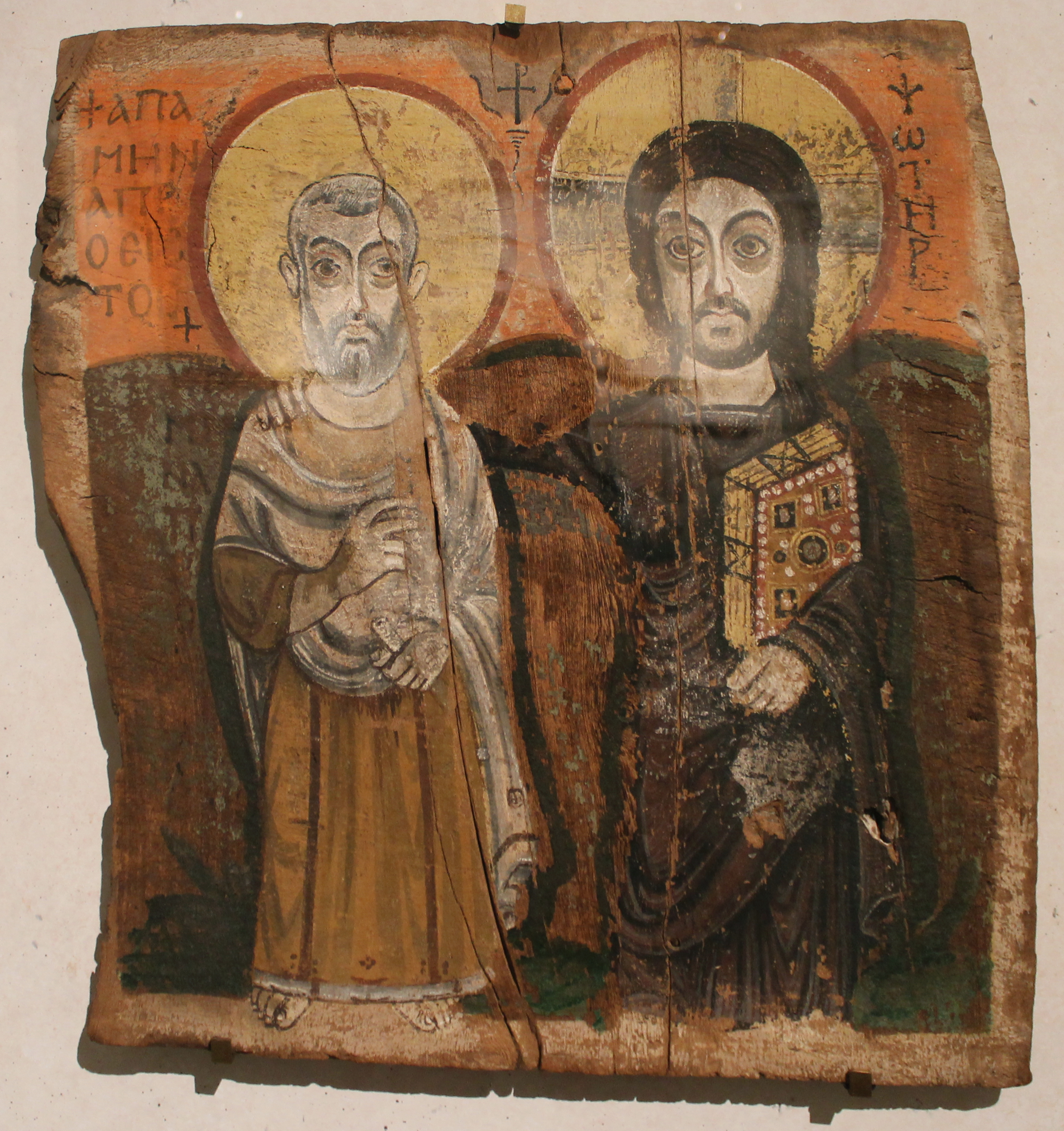
Christ and Saint Menas, 6th-century Coptic icon, Louvre

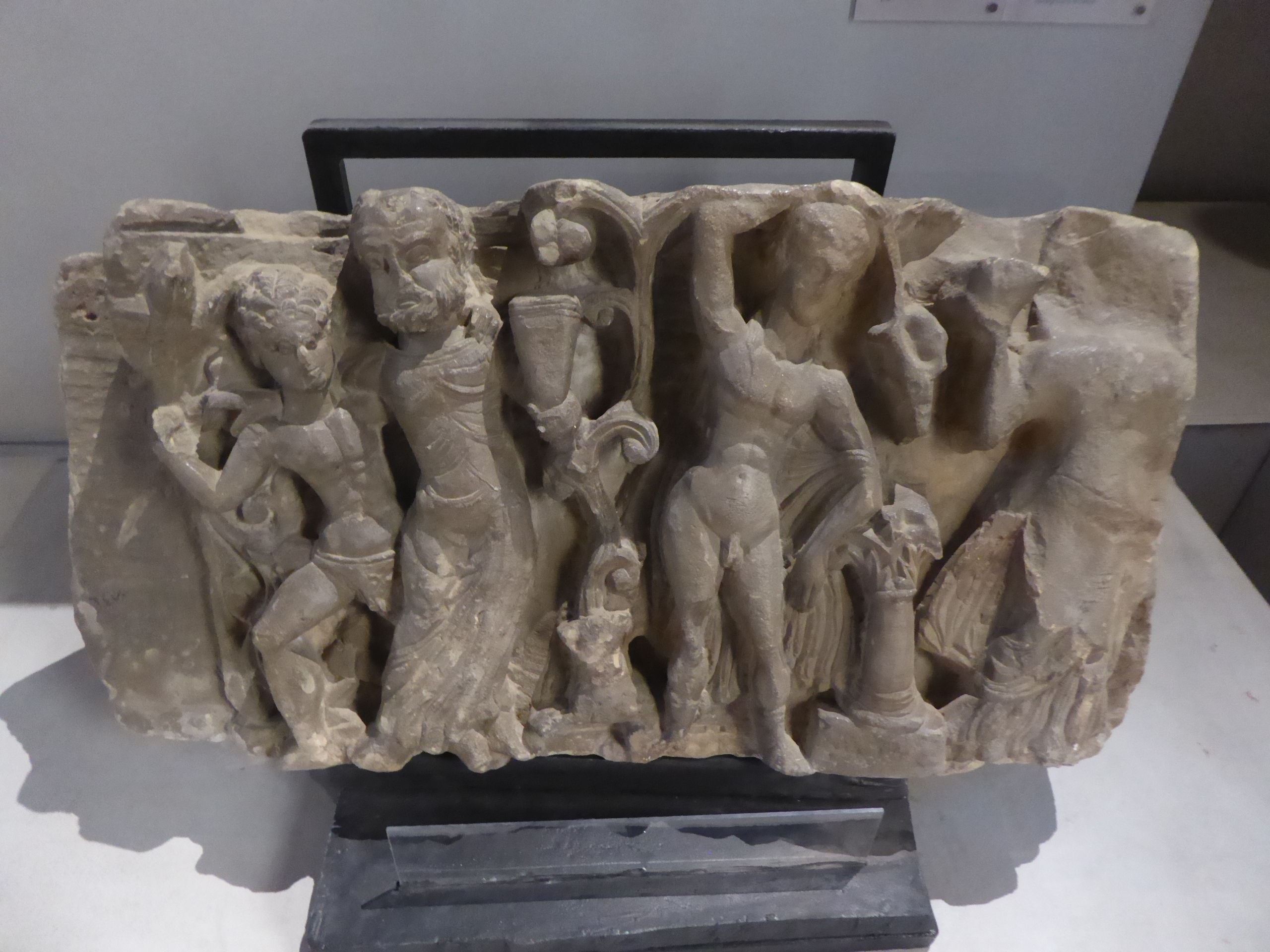
Figurative capital, Coptic Museum, Cairo.

Coptic art is Egyptian artistic tradition. It is the Christian art of the Byzantine-Greco-Roman Egypt and of Coptic Christian Churches. Coptic art is best known for its wall-paintings, textiles, illuminated manuscripts, and metalwork, much of which survives in monasteries and churches. The artwork is often functional, as little distinction was drawn between artistry and craftsmanship, and includes tunics and tombstones as well as portraits of saints. The Coptic Museum in Coptic Cairo houses some of the world's most important examples of Coptic art.

== Origins ==
Coptic art displays a mix of Egyptian and Hellenistic influences. Subjects and symbols were taken from both Greek and Egyptian mythology, sometimes altered to fit Christian beliefs. Persia and Syria also influenced Coptic and Hellenistic art, though to a lesser extent, leaving images such as the peacock and the griffin.

== Icon painting ==
Coptic icons have their origin in the Greco-Roman art of Egypt's Late Antiquity, as exemplified by the Fayum mummy portraits. The faces of El Fayum are examples of the Coptic art in the 2nd century AD showing the Greek and Roman influence on the Coptic art but with some distinctive features related to Egyptian art.

The Muslim conquest of Egypt allowed the local Coptic art to influence Egypt's then Islamic art and architecture with many features that are now integral in many Egyptian buildings.

Beginning in the 4th century, churches painted their walls and made icons to reflect an authentic expression of their faith.

The figures of saints display eyes and ears larger in proportion to the rest of the face and a smaller mouth, as well as enlarged heads, signifying a spiritual relationship with God and devotion to prayer. Martyrs' faces were peaceful.

Many Coptic icon painters did not sign their names, but the prominent among them include St. Luke (traditionally believed to be the first icon painter) and two Coptic Popes, Pope Macarius I and Pope Gabriel III

Starting mid-18th century icon painting enjoyed a revival in Egypt and once again was popular. One of the most famous artists was Yuhanna al-Armani whose works were noted for using more developed techniques and novel construction (e.g. using a set of icons to tell a single story).

== Influence ==
The influence of Coptic art and architecture on Islamic architecture and incorporation of some Coptic features in Islamic buildings started as early as the 7th century AD

As the Church of Alexandria was the first Church of Africa the influence of Coptic art spread to Sudan and Ethiopia. Some forms of the Coptic cross are known as the Ethiopian cross and many churches in Ethiopia show the influence of the Coptic art.

Menas flasks are very cheap terracotta bottles bought by pilgrims to Abu Mina, the shrine of Saint Menas, in the 4th and 5th centuries. The clay was impressed before firing with blocks with images of the saint. They have been found nearly all over the Christian world, and many scholars trace influence from their fairly crude images in the emerging iconography of Western medieval art, among other Coptic influences.

== Textiles ==
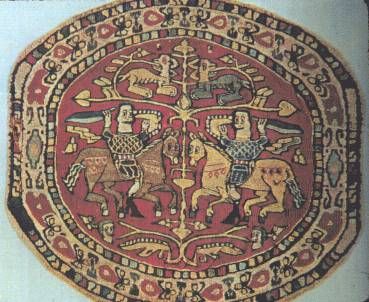
Rondel, wool on linen, 6th century, Syrian or Egyptian Coptic. Cooper Union museum.

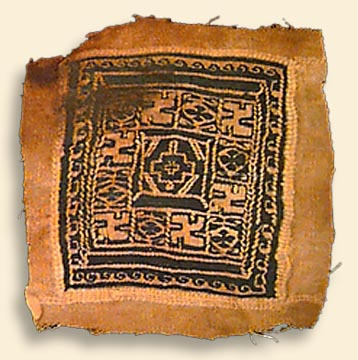
Tunic ornament, wool, tapestry weave, 10th century. California Academy of Sciences collections.

A remarkable number of Coptic textiles survive today, due to the Coptic custom of burying them with the dead, and to the aridity of Egyptian graves. The textiles are commonly linen or wool and use the colors red, blue, yellow, green, purple, black and brown. The dyes were derived from madder, indigo, woad, saffron, the murex shell, and the kermes insect. The first looms used were horizontal low-warp; vertical high-warp looms were introduced later. The basic garment was the tunic, which would become the dalmatic. Some tunics were woven in one piece. They were decorated by clavi, a stylistic import from Rome.

Some fine examples of the Coptic textile are shown in museums all over the world and a large collection is in the Coptic Museum in Coptic Cairo Tens of thousands of coloured fragments found their way into the museums of the world, especially after 1889 when the French archaeologist Albert Gayet published a catalogue of Coptic art and, in the Bulaq Museum, staged the first exhibition of Coptic monuments. The early Coptic textiles still produced pictures and decoration incorporating Egyptian and Greek motifs. Shrouds, for example, might incorporate classical elements were painted in the form of an Egyptian sarcophagus and include representations of Egyptian gods to protect the dead. Later coptic textiles showed the influence of Byzantium and later, Islamic art.

== Modern Coptic art ==
Modern Coptic art is also known as the Neo-Coptic school. In recent centuries icons have been the main means of expression, keeping most traditional aspects. Coptic icons are more concerned with religious truth and beauty than with realism, the depiction of depth, or perspective. As in the Byzantine and related traditions, the figures are depicted frontally, looking straight at the viewer. Today, Coptic icons are found not only in churches, but also in homes and praying altars. They may also be purchased from Coptic gift shops throughout Egypt and the Coptic diaspora.

During the papacy of Pope Cyril VI, the emergence of Coptic painters like Isaac Fanous Youssef, along with the revival of Coptic art, brought about the creation of the Contemporary or Neo-Coptic school of iconography.

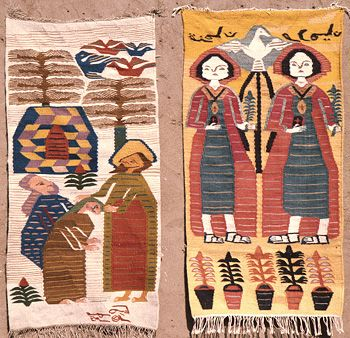
1960 Weaving by Maryam Hermina. "Healing the Woman" left, "St.Cosman & St.Damien", right, woven at Ramses Wissa Wassef Museum – Giza

In 1952, architect and Coptic Christian Ramses Wissa Wassef founded the Ramses Wissa Wassef Art Center in Giza, Egypt. He asked 14 children, mostly Copts, to develop a new artform by reviving the ancient coptic weaving method. The coptic weaver Maryam Hermina (born 1932) taught the children the technique. The Art Centre has a significant museum of the 20th century tapestries.

== Gallery ==
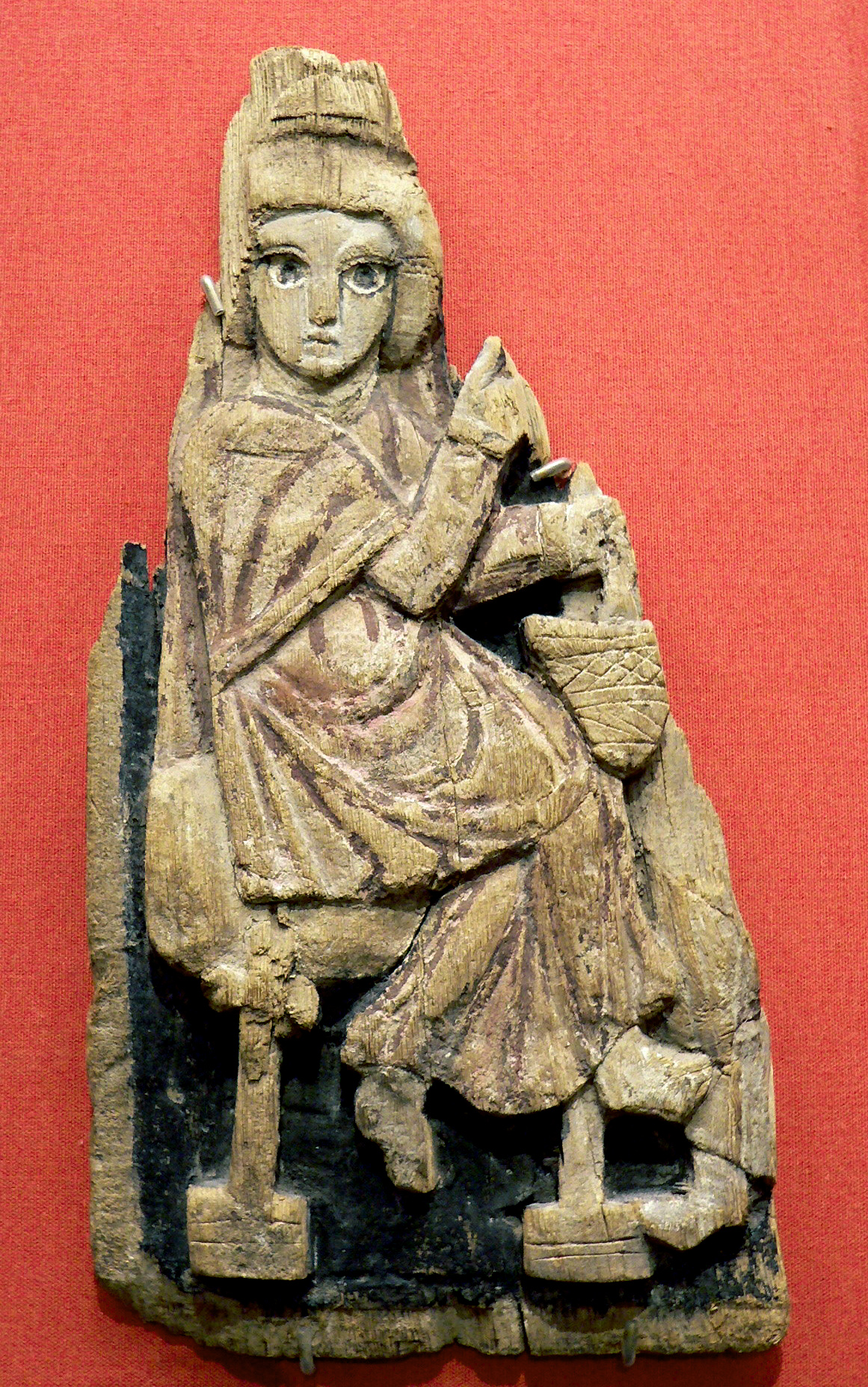
Part of wood relief of the Annunciation, 5th century, Louvre

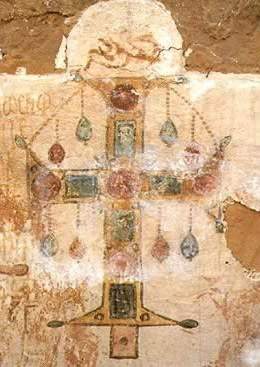
Wall painting of a cross (crux gemmata), late 6th century, Kellia, Egypt

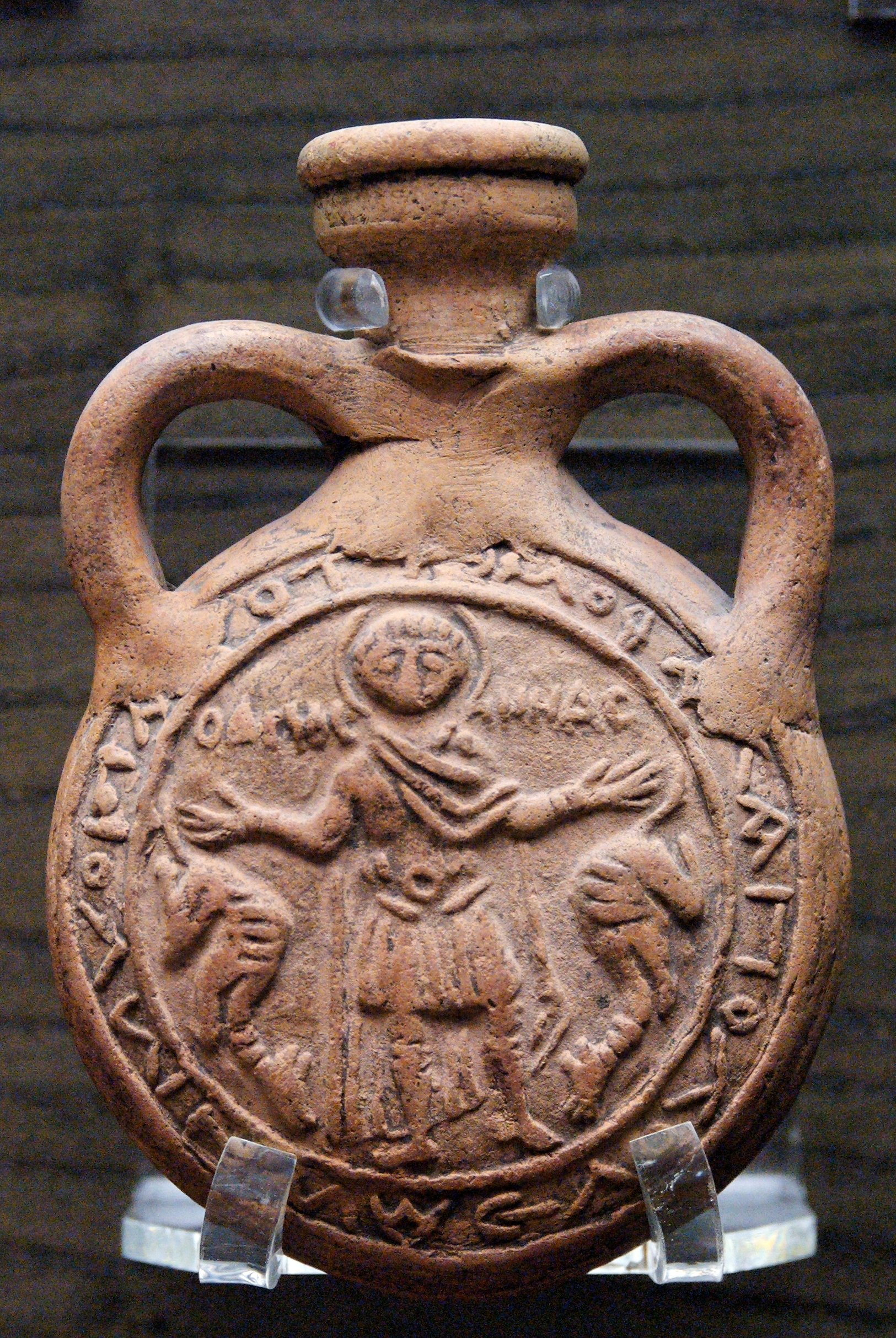
Terracotta pilgrim's Menas flask impressed with Saint Minas between two camels, Byzantine, 6th–7th century, probably made at Abu Mina, Egypt

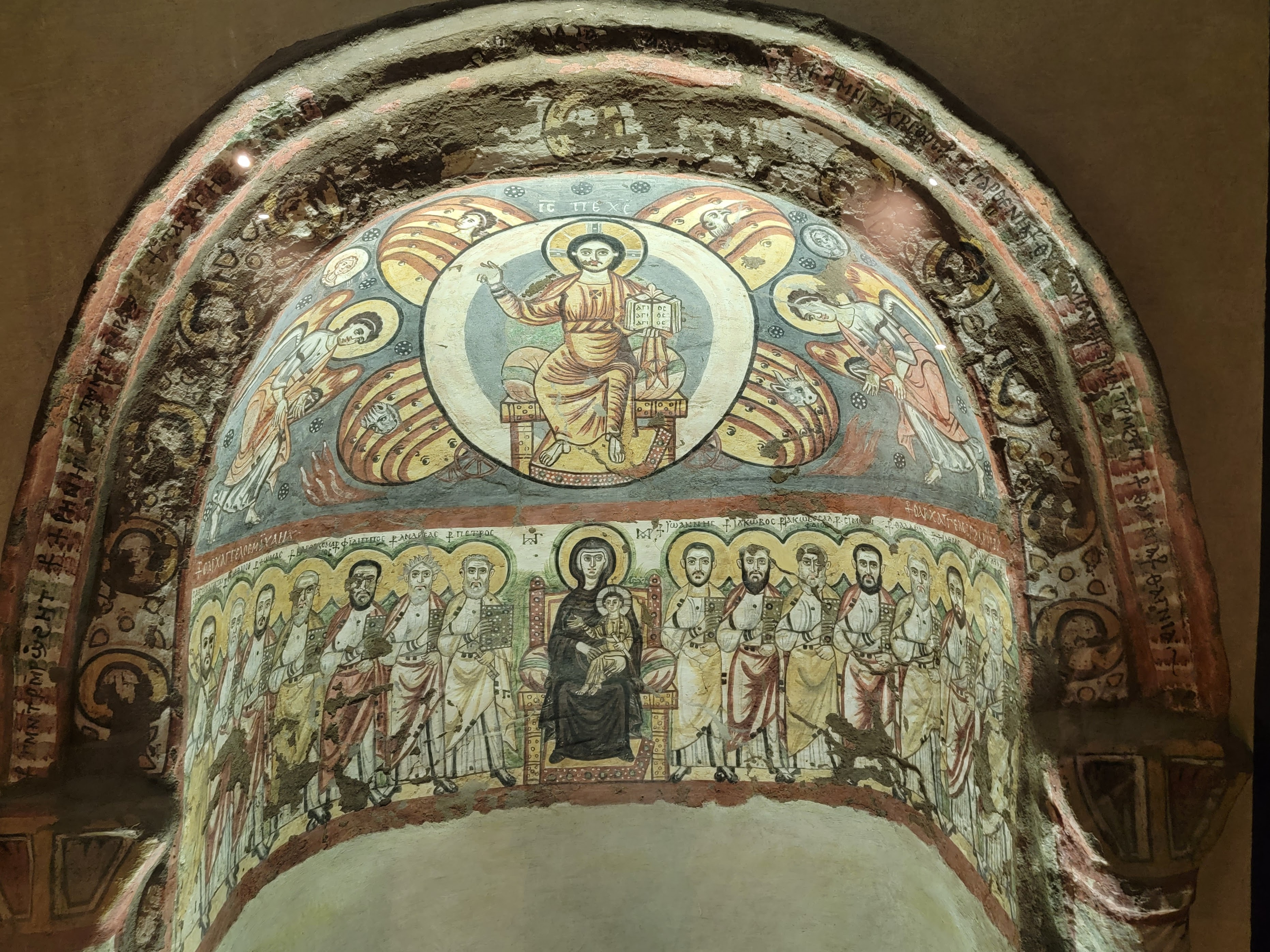
Niche from the Monastery of Apa Apollo in Bawit, 6th–7th century, Tempera, The Coptic Museum of Cairo

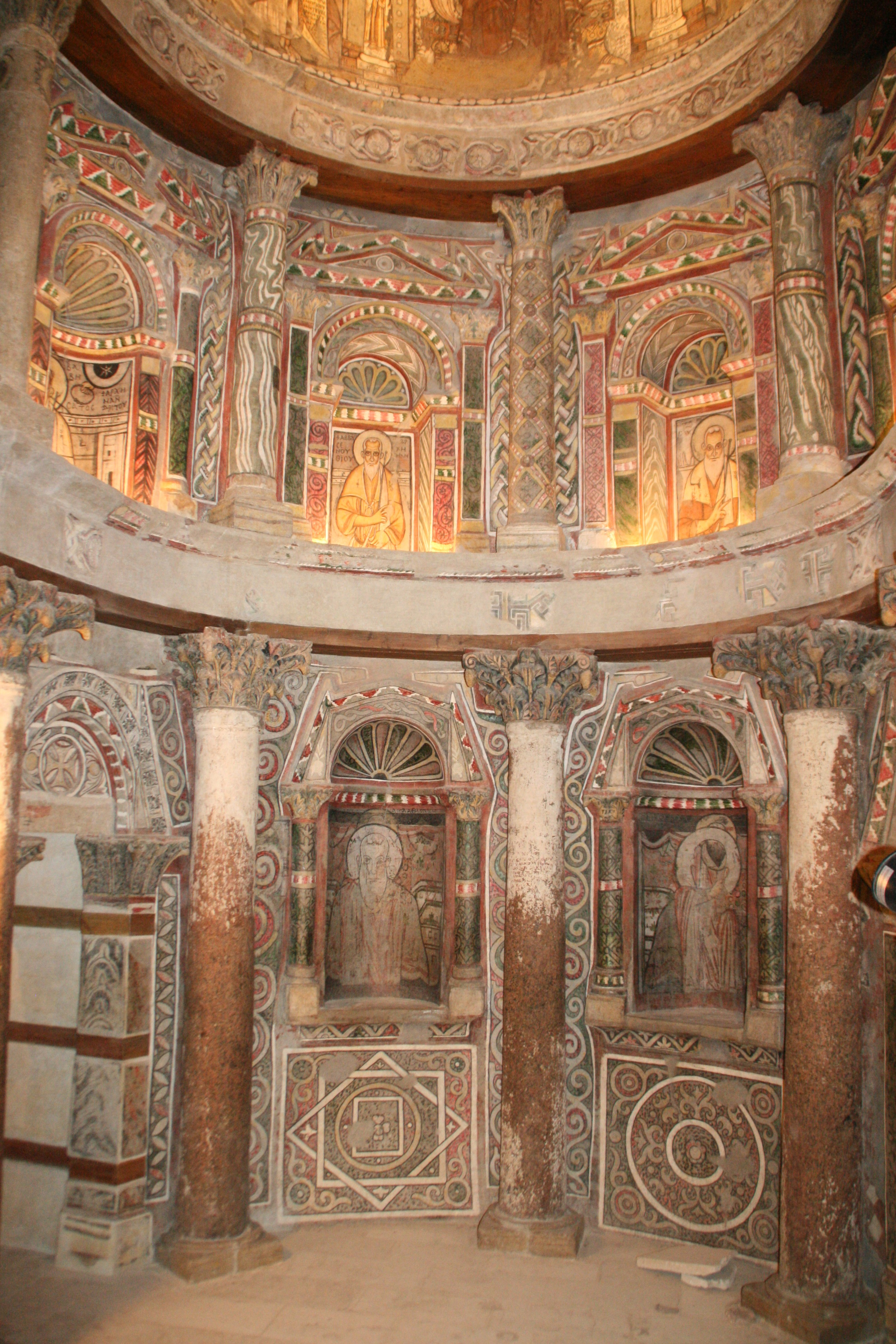
North apse of the Red Monastery, 7th century

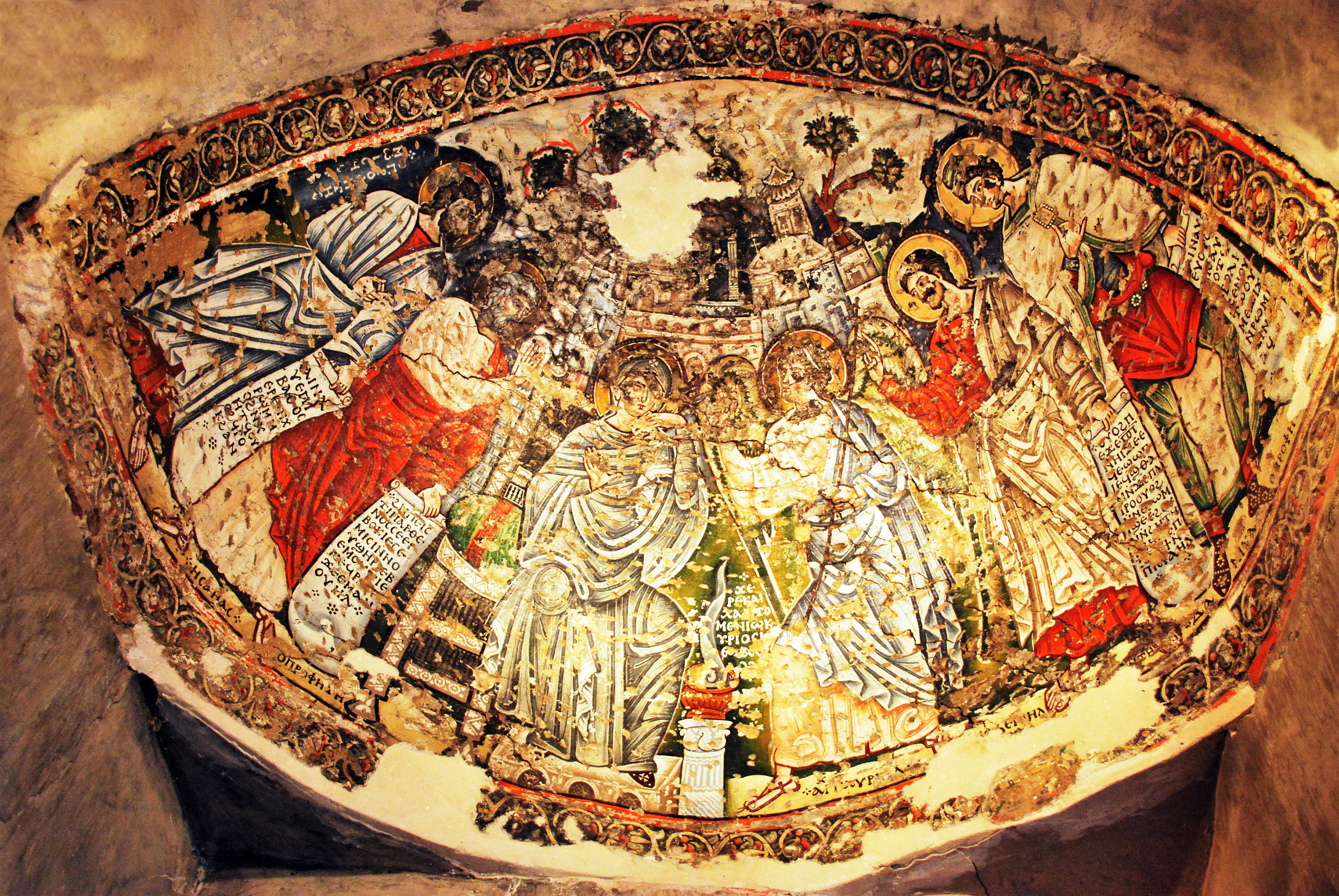
Encaustic painting of the Annunciation flanked by four Old Testament prophets, 8th century, Syrian Monastery

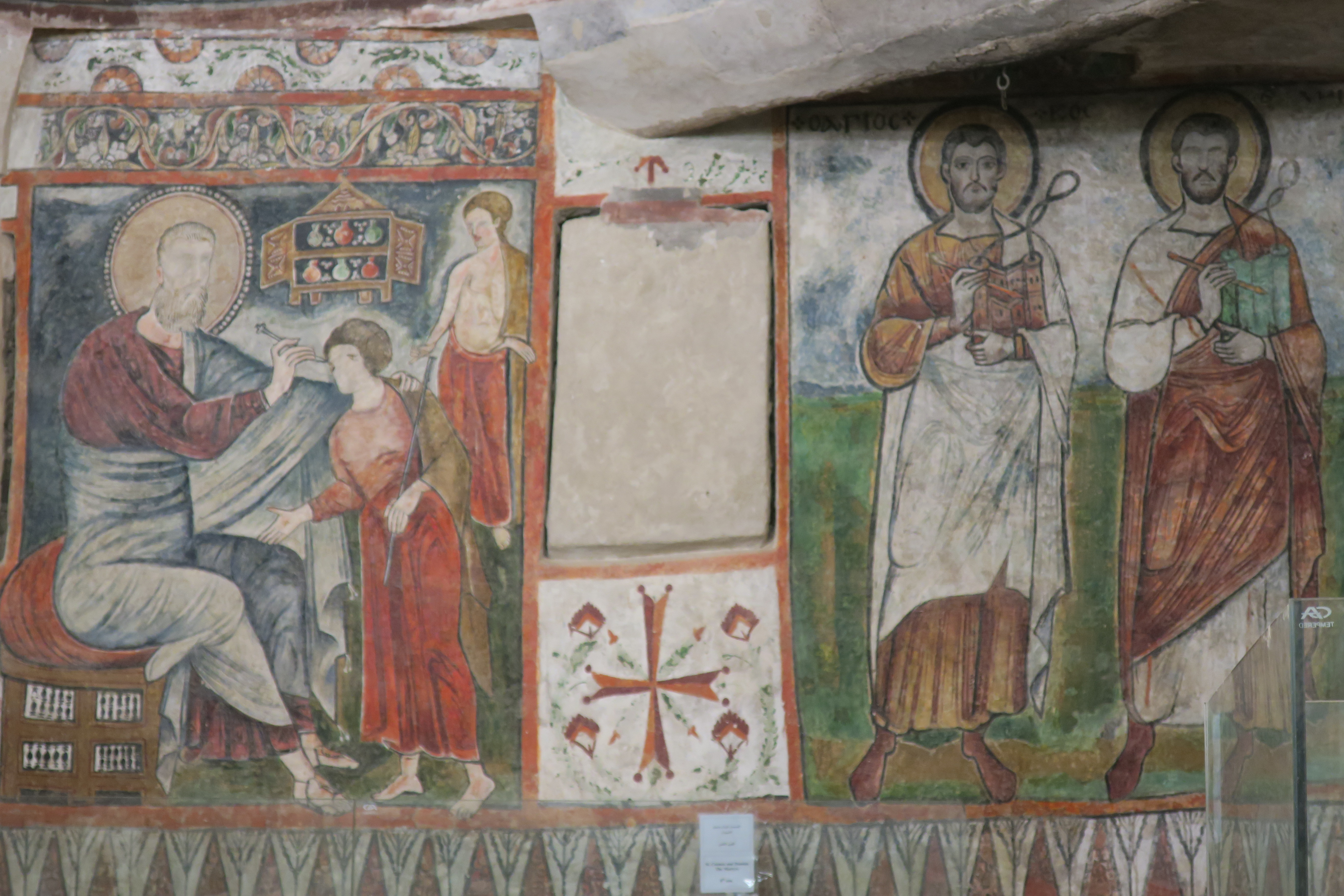
Saint Colluthus performing an eye operation, 8th century, Syrian Monastery

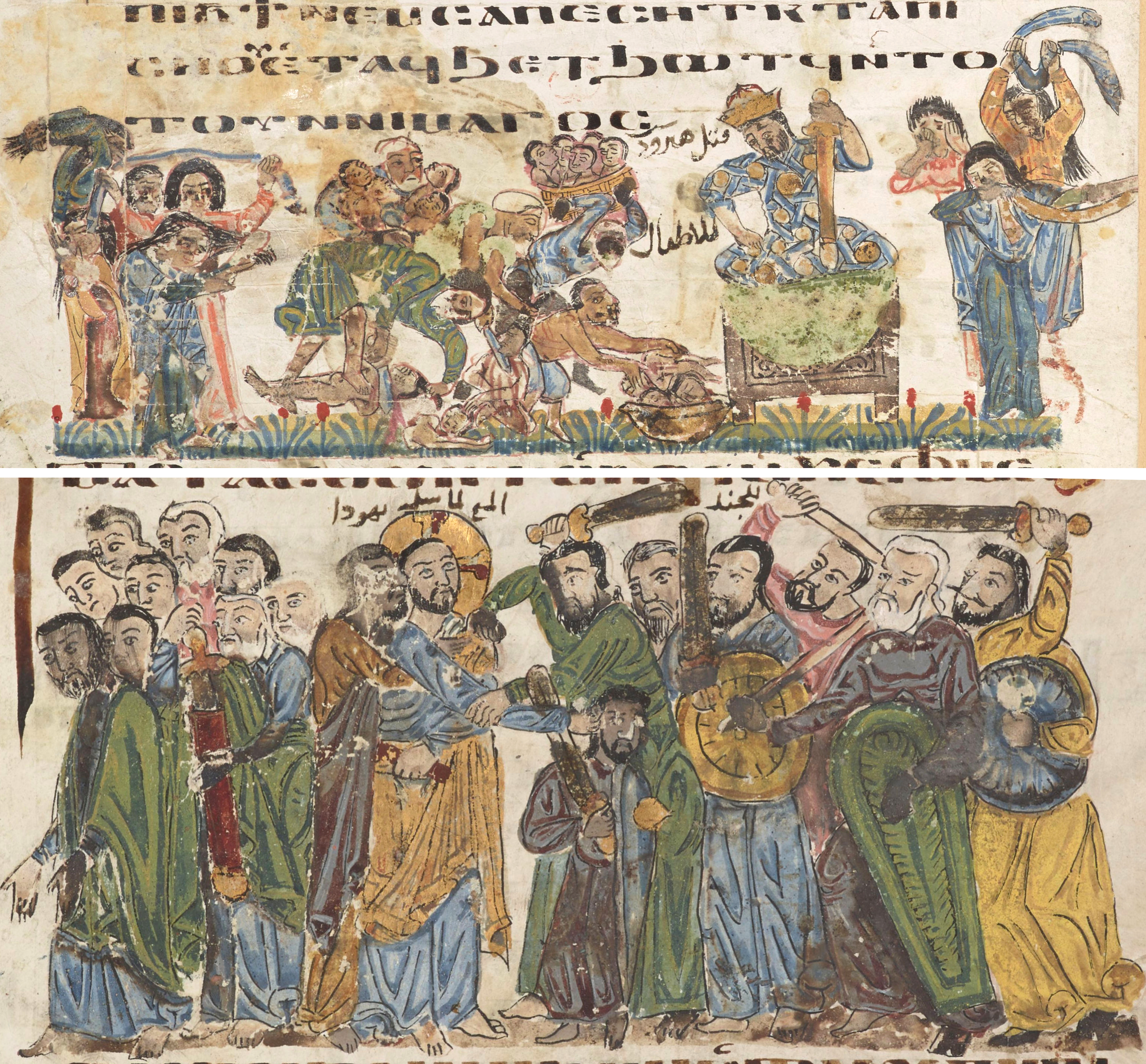
Illuminated gospel depicting the Massacre of the Innocents and the arrest of Jesus, 1179–1180

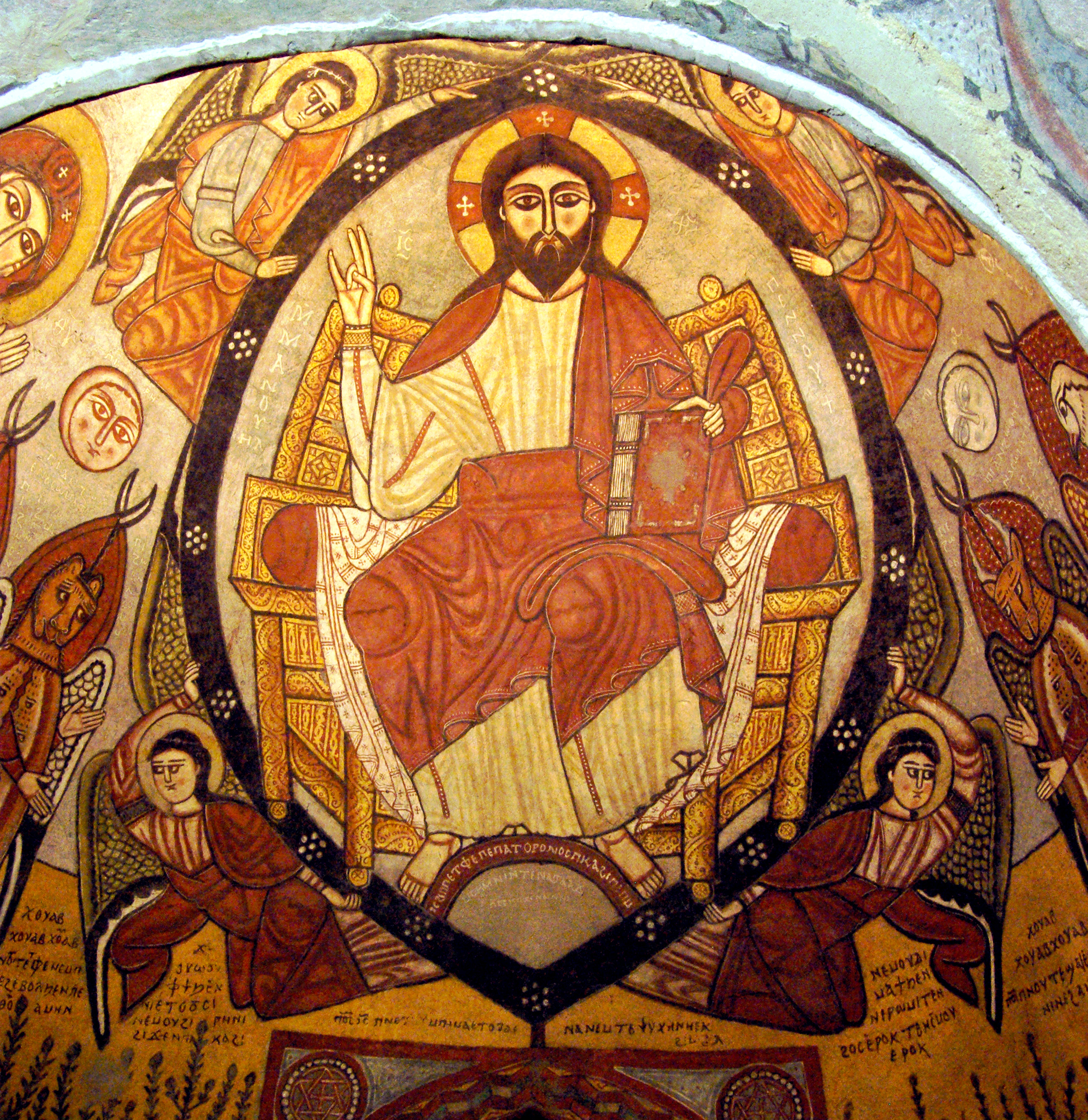
Fresco of Christ Pantocrator by Theodore, 13th century, Monastery of Saint Anthony

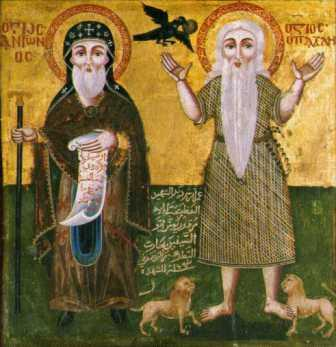
Saints Anthony the Great and Paul of Thebes, 14th century

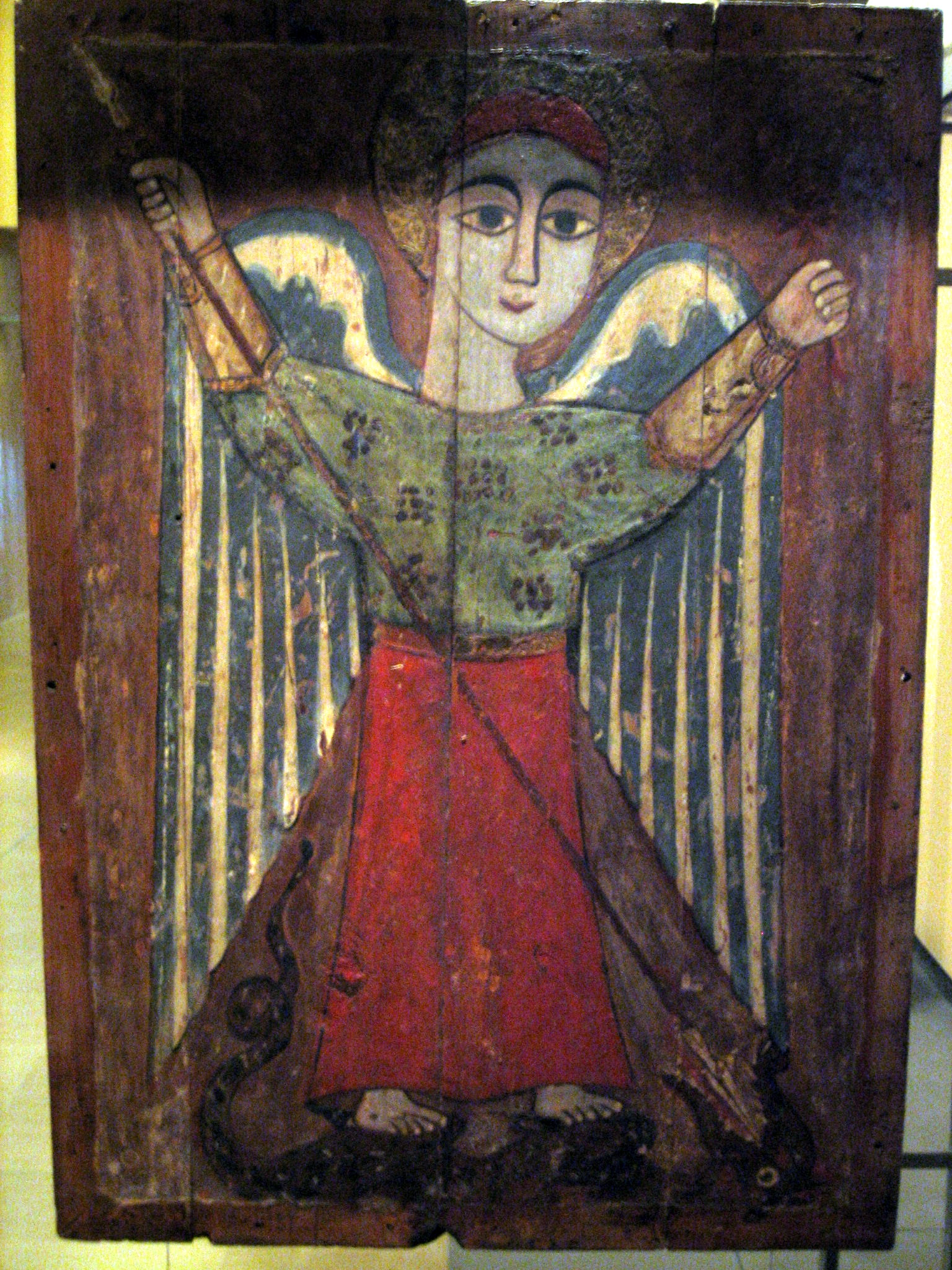
Coptic icon of an Archangel, 17th century, Athens

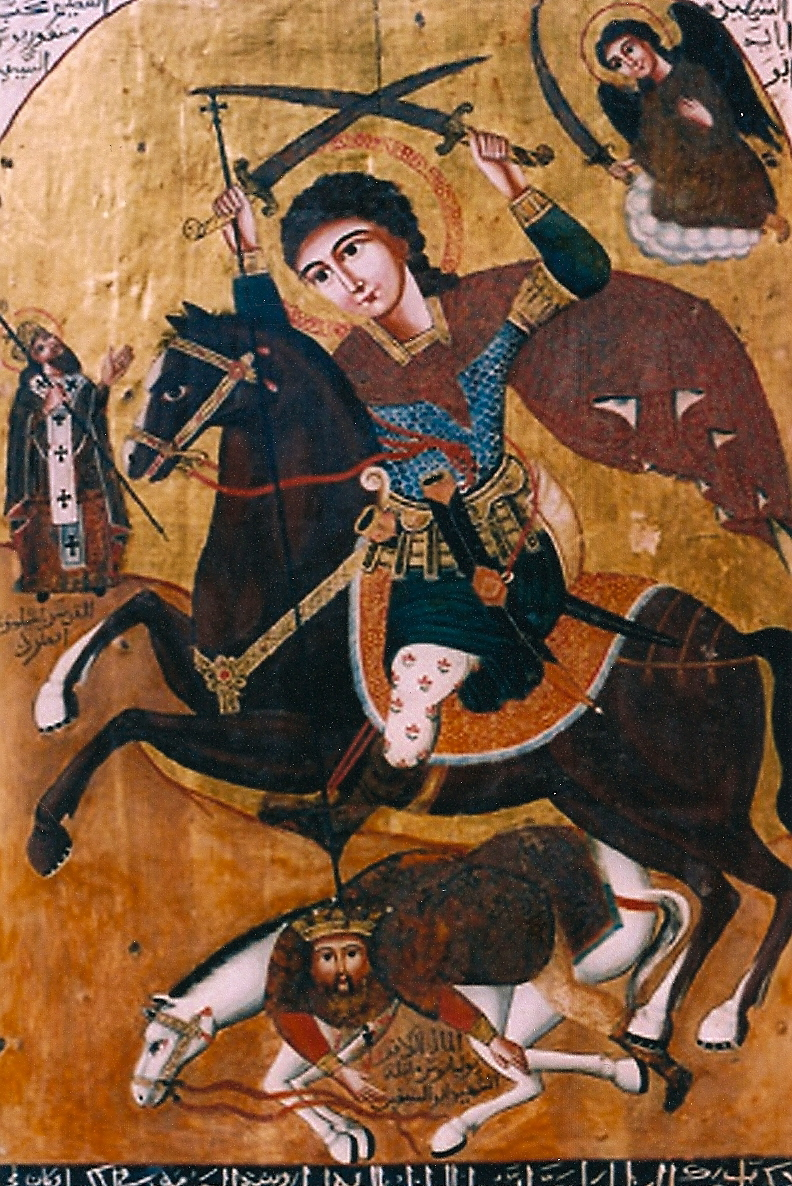
Icon of Saint Mercurius by Yuhanna al-Armani, 18th century

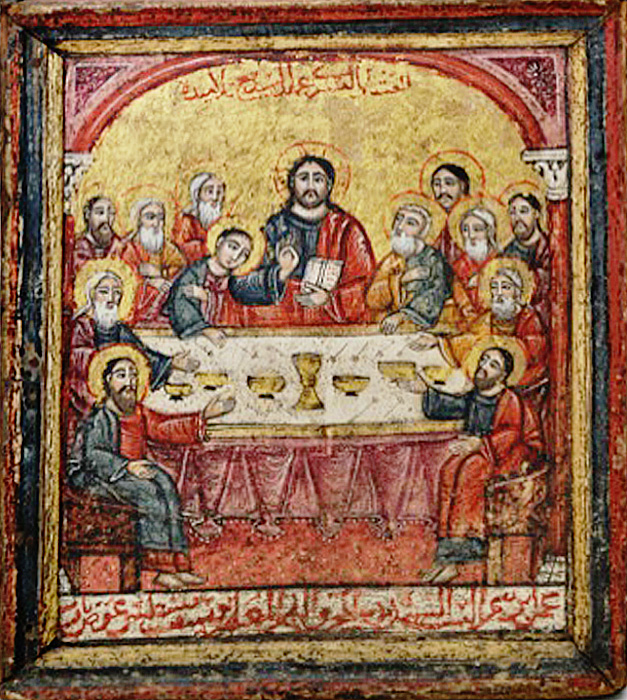
Coptic icon of the Last Supper by Anastasi Al Rumi, 19th century

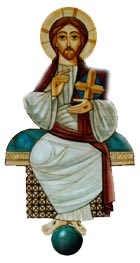
Modern Coptic icon of Jesus Christ

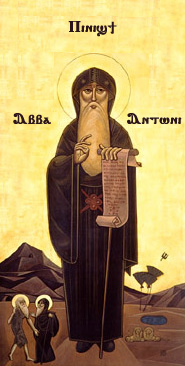
Modern Coptic icon of Saint Anthony the Great

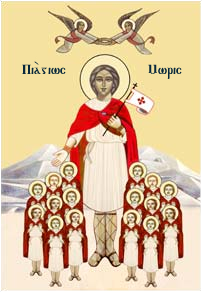
Coptic icon of Saint Maurice

== See also ==
- Coptic Museum
- Isaac Fanous
- Coptic script
- Coptic Orthodox Church
- Coptology
- Adel Nassief
- Institute of Coptic Studies
