= Icon of Christ and Abbot Mena =

8th-century Coptic painting

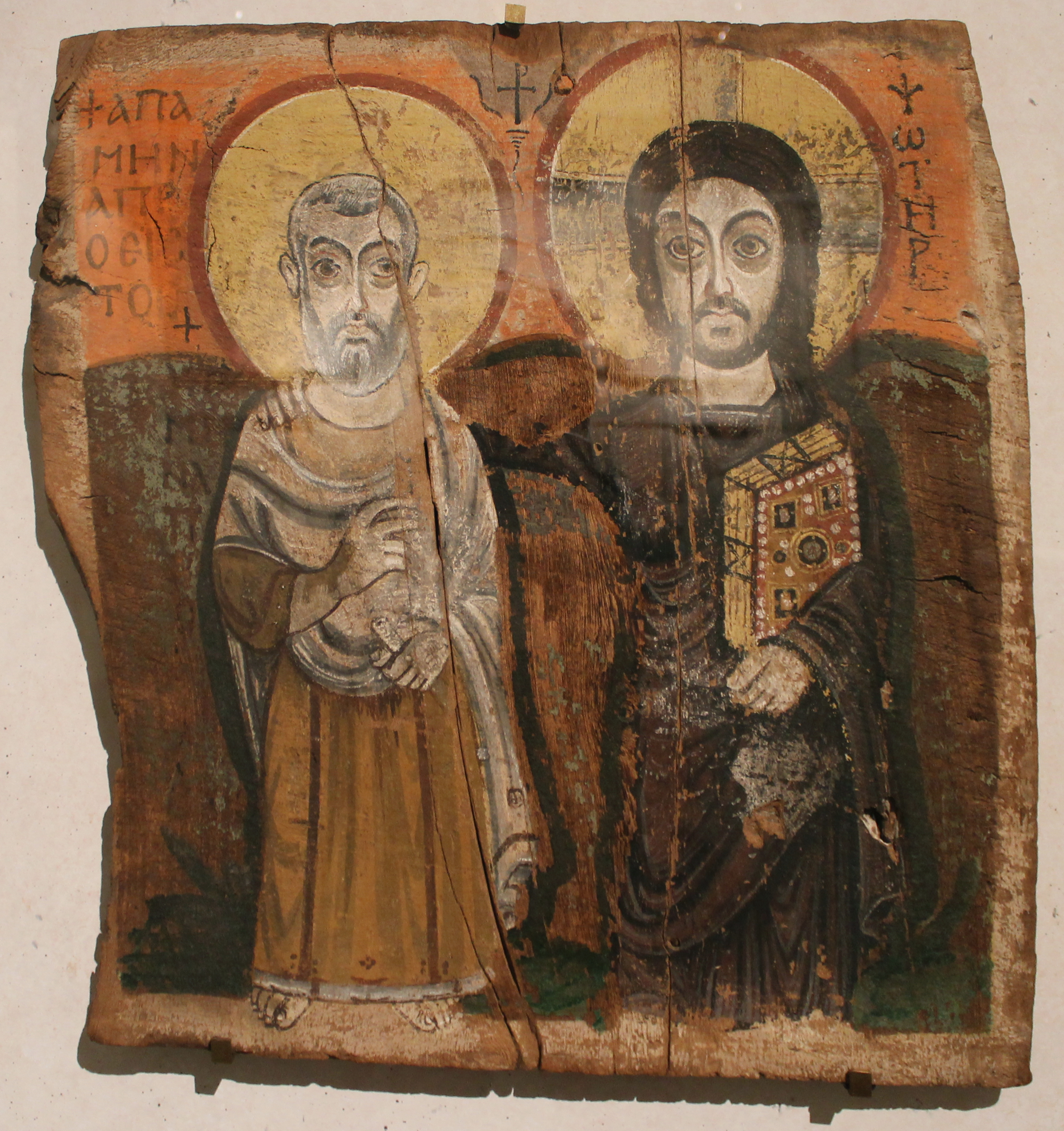
Christ and Abbot Menas icon, Louvre, Paris

The Icon of Christ and Abbot Mena (French: L'Icône du Christ et de l'Abbé Ménas) is a Coptic painting which is now in the Louvre museum, in Paris. The icon is an encaustic painting on wood and was brought from the Apollo monastery in Bawit, Egypt. The icon measures about 57 by 57 centimetres (22.4 by 22.4 inches) and is 2 centimetres (0.79 inches) thick. The icon has been damaged over the years with some of the pigment missing and it has two vertical cracks running through the image, but it can still be readily made out.

== Description ==
Dated to the second half of the 6th century, before Arab occupation, the icon depicts Christ with his cruciform halo behind him and standing next to Abbot Saint Menas (from the fifth century, not to be confused with Saint Menas the martyr of the early fourth century AD) who is also depicted with a halo indicating his sainthood. The identification of the figures in the icon as Jesus Christ and the abbot is established by inscriptions above their heads, which read "ΨΟΤHΡ (Savior)" and "ΑΠΑ ΜΗΝΑ ΠΡΟΕΙCΤΟC (Father Mena, guardian)". Christ is depicted holding an ornately designed, jewel-encrusted Bible in his left hand, while his right hand rests on the abbot's far shoulder, symbolizing his protective authority over Mena. The two figures stand side by side, with the abbot depicted slightly smaller in comparison. Mena holds a scroll in one hand, with the other hand gesturing in a blessing motion.

Christ, with his arm around the abbot is giving a sort of "introduction to the people" as he takes his place with the angels. Both are shown wearing a tunic and pallium, though of different colors. (Christ in purple with blue highlight and Mena in brown.) Christ has a small round beard, mustache and long wavy hair and Mena is grey-haired and bearded. The noticeably large eyes are intended to be exaggerated in the composition. Mena's left eye is focused on Christ, his right to those reading the Icon. Christ's right eye is focused on Mena, his left to those reading the icon. The eyes are often depicted large to symbolise spiritual vision, focusing not on earthly matters but on divine, eternal reality. When looking to the reader, they represent God's omniscience and care, often perceived as looking directly into the viewer's soul with immense love. When looking to each other, to highlight the focus on that divine, eternal reality. The color gradients where the background has green and brown hills that blend into an apricot-hued sky are clearly 6th century design, indicative of the Coptic, the largest Christian group in the region. The Egyptian church developed its own art traditions during the 6th century and used them in creating this icon and others like it.

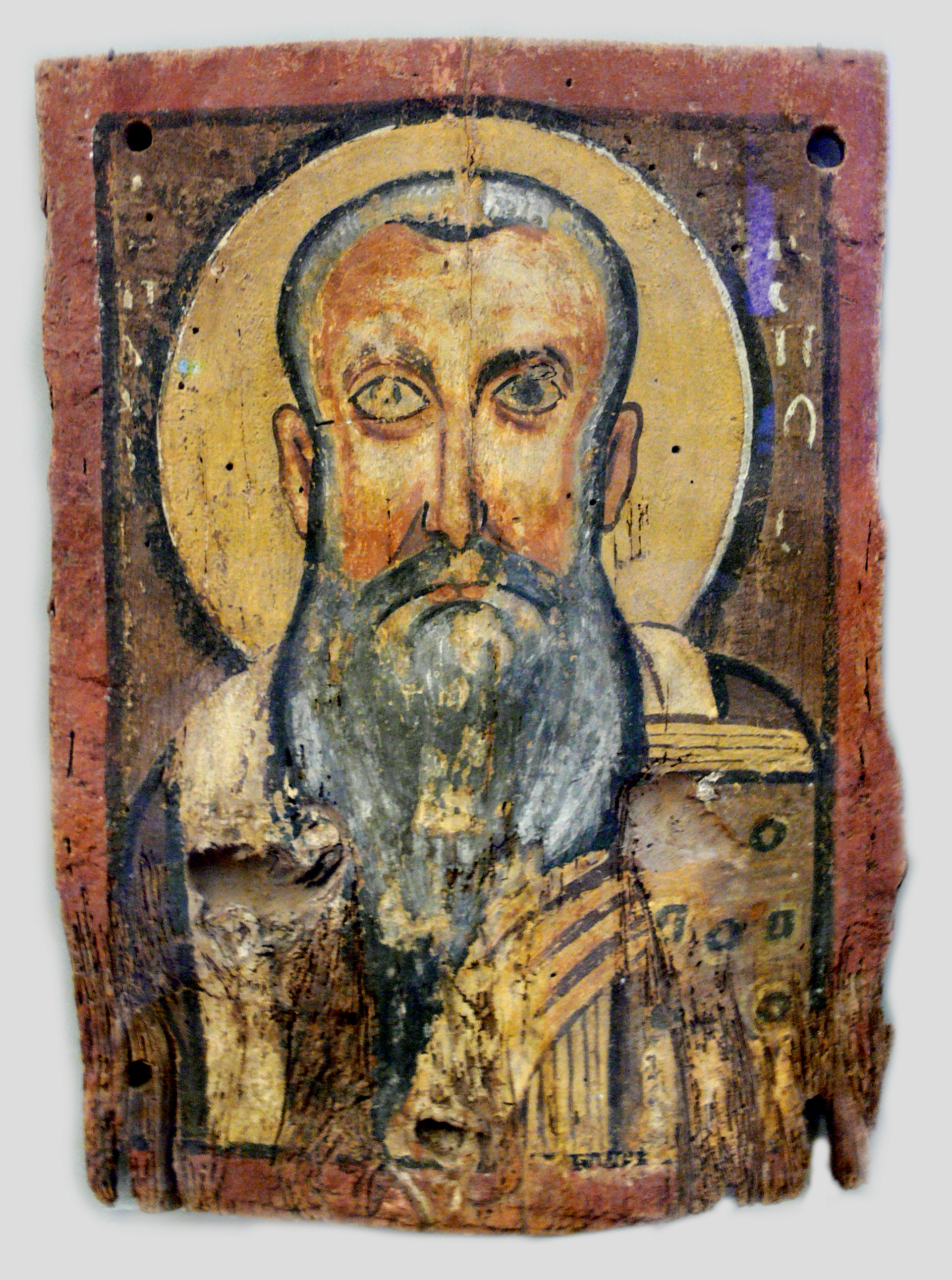
Our father Abraham, the Bishop, Bode Museum, Berlin

== Monastery of Bawit ==
When the monastery of Bawit was excavated, along with this icon of Christ many other works were discovered. Whole rooms covered in icons of saints were found and one icon Our father Abraham, the Bishop was also removed from the monastery. Because the idea of sainthood was in transition, many works were created to resemble those that would indicate the image is of a saint; this was to ensure if the person was later to be acknowledged as a saint, then there would be no need to retouch the portrait. The monastery, which is located on the west bank of the River Nile, was excavated in the twentieth century by a team from the Institut Français d'Archéologie Orientale, which was led by Jean Cledet and Jean Maspero.

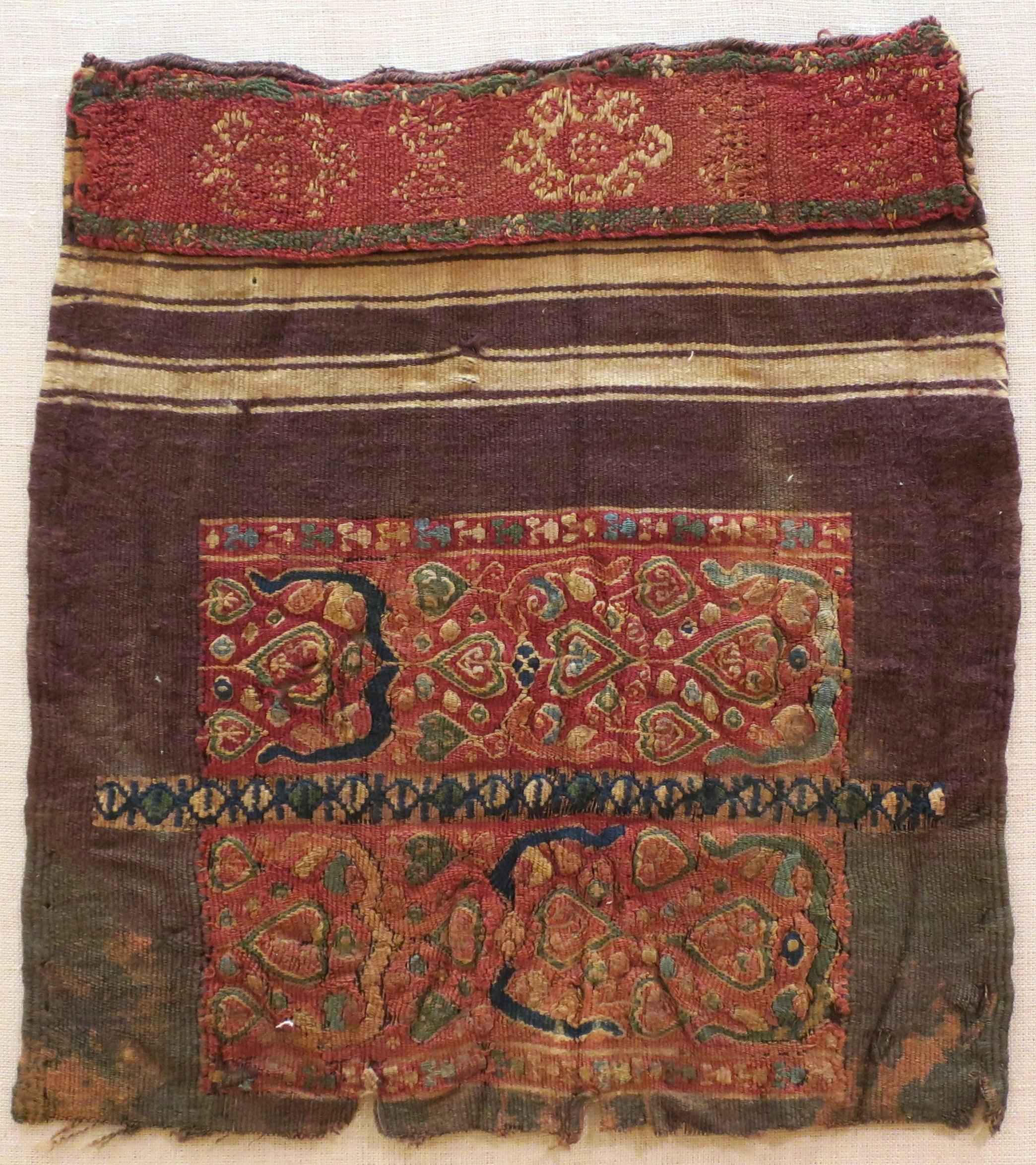
Coptic textile sample, 4th or 5th century, Lowe Art Museum

== Bibliography ==
- Belting, Hans, and Edmund Jephcott (2014). Likeness and presence: a history of the image before the era of art. The University of Chicago Press. ISBN 0226042146
- Gabra, Gawdat, and Hany N. Takla (2015). Christianity and monasticism in Middle Egypt. The American University in Cairo Press. ISBN 9781617976414
- Meinardus, Otto F. A. (2016). Two Thousand Years of Coptic Christianity. The American University in Cairo Press. ISBN 9789774167454
- “Obo.” Marie de France (2017). Medieval Studies – Oxford Bibliographies, 20 Nov.
- Weitzmann, Kurt (1979). Age of spirituality: late antique and early Christian art, third to seventh century. The Metropolitan Museum of Art. ISBN 0870991795
- Leonid Ouspensky; Vladimir Lossky (1982). The Meaning of Icons. St Vladimir’s Seminary Press. ISBN 0913836990
- "The Epiphany of the Eye" (n.d.). Orthodox Arts Journal.
