= Isaac Fanous =

Egyptian artist and scholar (1919– 2007)

Doctor Isaac Fanous
- Born: Isaac Fanous; 19 December 1919; Cairo, Egypt
- Died: 15 January 2007 (aged 87); Cairo, Egypt
- Education: Institute of Coptic Studies
- Occupations: Iconographer, Theologian, Art Historian

Isaac Fanous (Coptic: ⲓⲥⲁⲁⲕ ⲫⲁⲛⲟⲩⲥ; December 19, 1919 – January 15, 2007) was an Egyptian Copt iconographer, scholar and theologian, who single-handedly founded the most popular style of contemporary Coptic art today, commonly referred to as "Neo-Coptic".

== Early life and studies ==
Fanous was born in Al-Minya and moved to Cairo to gain his degree from The Faculty of Applied arts now part of Helwan University in Egypt in 1941 and got a diploma in teaching in 1943. Fanous was one of the first students of the Institute of Coptic Studies founded in 1954 and he obtained his doctorate in 1958 . His two-year study grant in the Louvre in the mid- 1960s was a turning point in his career. He took the opportunity, while in France, to study icon painting under Léonid Ouspensky, under whose patronage he developed a passion both as artist and theologian. This would lead, eventually, to him developing a style that was to become the new face of Coptic iconography in the mid-20th century.

Fanous chaired the Coptic Art department at the Institute of Coptic Studies in Cairo, and he has trained a number of other Coptic artists from outside Egypt.

== Political influences ==
As wealthy patrons of the arts disappeared from Egypt's cosmopolitan art world following the 1952 revolution, they were gradually replaced by select state-funding, causing the art world became more competitive: the highly innovative career of Fanous took off from the struggles and experiences of his time. During this period, he was known to have become more keenly aware of his Egyptian heritage and was proud of everything that came from Al-Minya since the time of Akhnaten, who founded his city.

== Modern Coptic iconography ==
For centuries before painters like Isaac Fanous the Coptic Orthodox church had its own style which is recognised as the traditional Coptic style. Under the influence of European art, which spread to Egypt in the nineteenth Century, a lot of the Churches in Egypt appeared, with Icons that were stylistically similar and often identical to a lot of Western Christian art, especially that of Protestants.

Fanous's contemporary school of iconography came about as part of a general renaissance of Coptic culture, which began during the patriarchate of Pope Cyril VI (1959–1971).

He drew on the already established old Coptic style, like that of Yuhanna al-Armani, as well having taken the influences from popular Western Protestant art, gradually developing in his own style, his style became widely recognized for its amplified symmetry, added minimalism and exaggerated Idiosyncrasy of previous Coptic art; his style is widely referred to as "Modern Coptic Style" or simply "Neo-Coptic".

He is not just considered a pioneer in this field, but Fanous is held to be the father of modern Coptic iconography and the initiator of the modern renaissance in Coptic art.

Fanous painted all the illustrations and icons in St. Takla Haymanot's Church in Alexandria, which was consecrated in 1969. Between 1977 and 1978, he spent six months in the UK to paint icons in St Mark's Coptic Orthodox Church in Allen Street, Kensington, London.

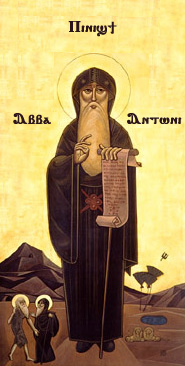
Coptic icon of Saint Anthony the Great

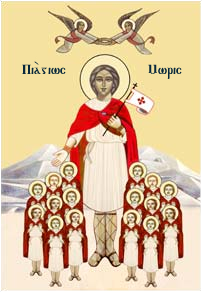
Coptic icon of Saint Maurice

== Awards ==
- Gold medal from the Institute of Oriental Studies, Venice, 1987
- Honorary doctorate, from Pope Shenouda III of Alexandria, Cairo, 1984

== See also ==
- Coptic art
- Coptic Orthodox Church of Alexandria
- Icon
- List of prominent Copts
