= Bawit =

Bāwīṭ: Arabic: باويط; Coptic: ⲡⲁⲩⲏⲧ
- Village
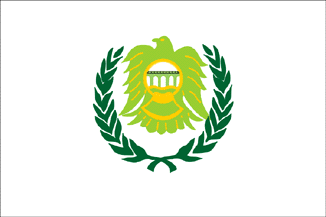
- Flag

- Location in Egypt
- Coordinates: 27°33.0′N 30°43.15′E
- Country: Egypt
- Established: 4th-century

Government
  - Type: Asyut Governorate

Area
  - Total: 0.19 sq mi (0.5 km^{2})

Population (2006)
  - Total: 9,516
  - Social metro village: 12,000
  - Religion: Sunni Islam with Some Shia adherents live in social village
- Time zone: UTC+2 (EET)

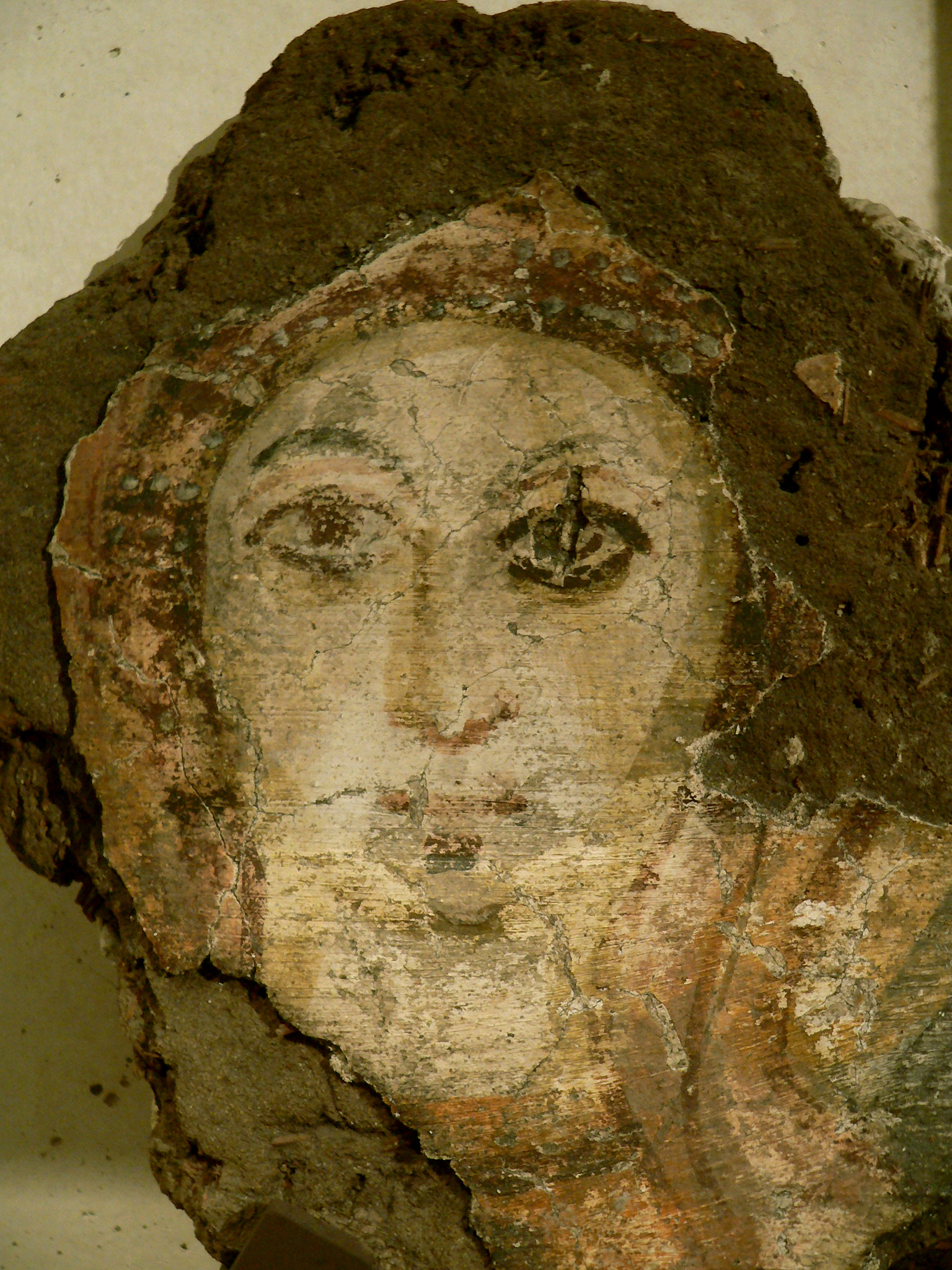
Fragment of a mural from Bawit

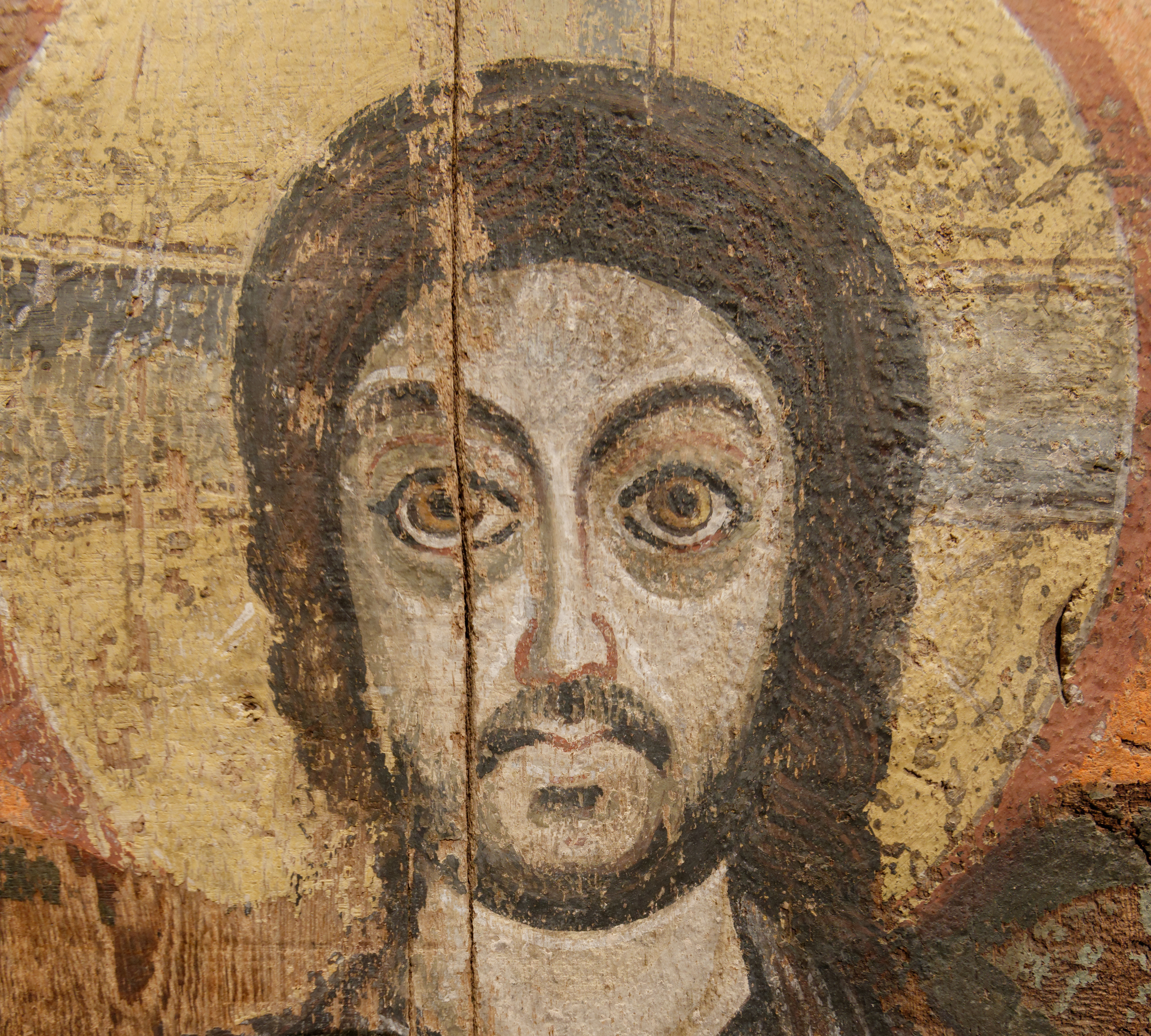
Detail of Christ from the Icon of Christ and Abbot Mena

Bawit (Arabic: باويط Bāwīṭ; Coptic: ⲡⲁⲩⲏⲧ Pavēt) is an archaeological site located 80 kilometres (50 mi) north of Asyut, near the village of Dashlout, in Egypt. It covers an area of 40 hectares (99 acres), and houses a cemetery and the ruins of the Hermopolite monastery of Apa Apollo founded by Apollo in the late fourth century. The structures on this site are relatively well preserved, and demonstrate different aspects of a monastic complex of Middle Egypt.

== History ==
The Apa Apollo monastery (Coptic: ⲧⲟⲡⲟⲥ ⲛⲁⲡⲁ ⲁⲡⲟⲗⲗⲱ) is a Coptic monastery founded c. 385/390 and had about 500 monks. The sixth and seventh centuries were a period of prosperity for this monastery, which then hosted a community of women, under the patronage of Rachel. A fresco found at the monastery depicting Rachel dates to the sixth century. After the Islamic invasion, the monastery declined, and was abandoned around the tenth century.

== Excavation ==
In early 1901, a survey of the site and surrounding areas was made by Jean Clédat, who was based at the French Institute of Oriental Archaeology in Cairo. Continuing into 1902, Clédat was assisted by Émile Gaston Chassinat and Charles Palanque. Clédat found hermitages he called "chapels" that contained Coptic art. His colleagues discovered two churches, today simply called North and South Church, with stone and wood carvings that were removed to the Coptic Museum in Cairo and the Musée du Louvre in Paris. Numerous sculptures and paintings were unearthed during the excavations. The papyrologist Jean Maspero (1885–1915) resumed excavations in 1913, discovering a common room with several entrances. In 1976, then 1984 and 1985, the Supreme Council of Antiquities resumed excavations and added to the collections of the Coptic Museum. Since then, excavations have continued under various organizations.
