= Adam Henein =

Egyptian sculptor (1929–2020)

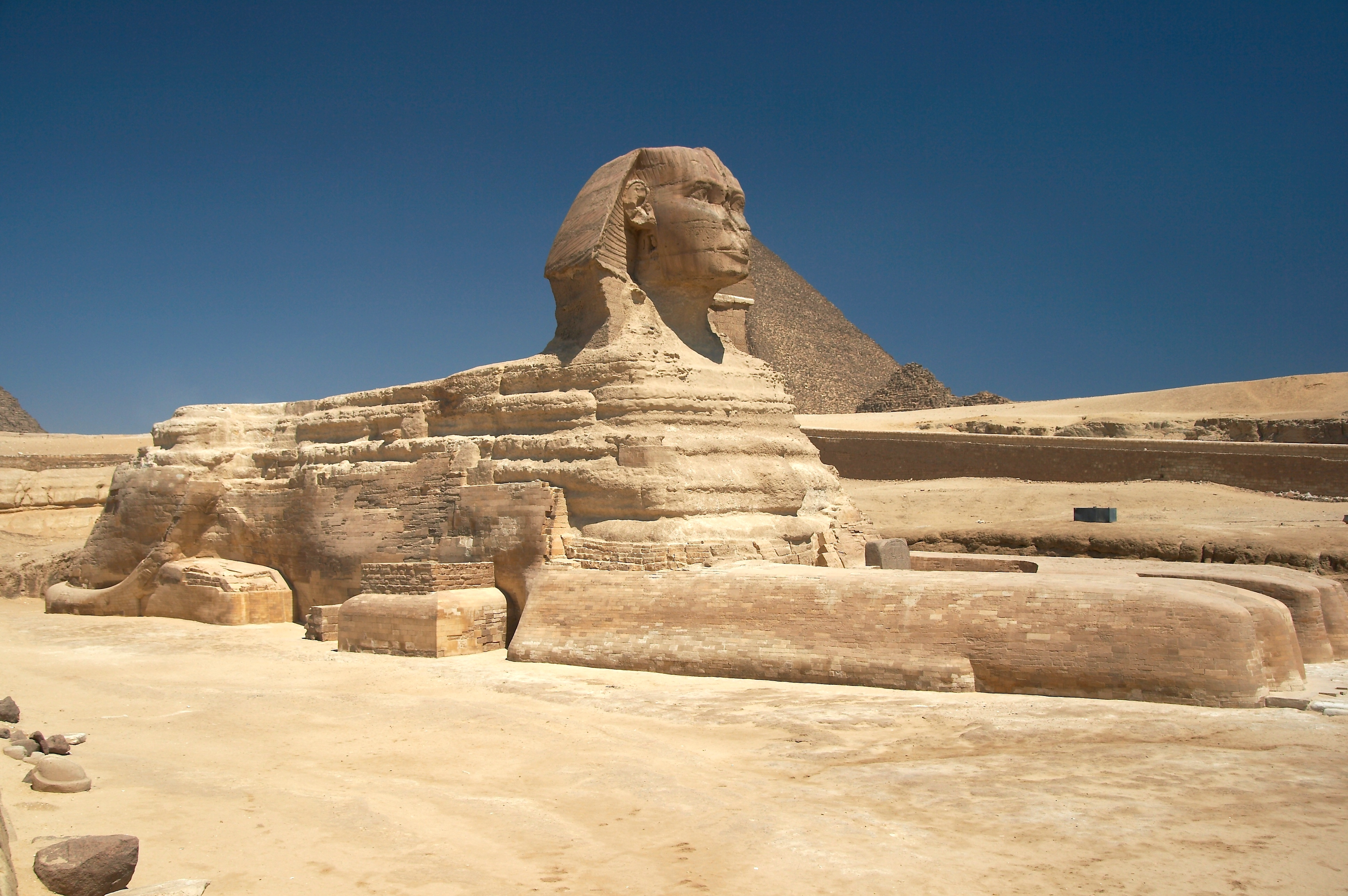
Sphinx of Giza restored 1989 by Adam Henein

Adam Henein (Arabic: آدم حنين; 31 March 1929 – 22 May 2020) was an Egyptian modernist sculptor and painter known for his restoration work on the Great Sphinx of Giza as well as his influence on Arab modernist sculpture.

== Biography ==
Adam Henein, originally given the name Samuel Henein at birth, was born into a family of metalworkers originally from Asyut, who had moved to and began working in Cairo in 1929. He was trained as a sculptor at the Academy of Fine Art in Cairo, from which he received his degree in 1953. His family were Coptic Christians. He converted to Islam in 1961 when he met his wife, Afaf el Dib, and changed his name to Adam. Henein died on 22 May 2020, he was 91 years old.

== Career ==
Henein became known as a sculptor in the 1950s; he received the Luxor prize in 1954–56, and his work was shown in Cairo, Alexandria, and Munich by the end of that decade. When he moved to Paris in 1971, Henein began to explore painting. In both his paintings and his sculptures, he gained recognition for the use of ancient Egyptian themes and traditional materials. He was the founder and director of the annual international sculpture symposium in Aswan, and this position, for which he was known internationally.

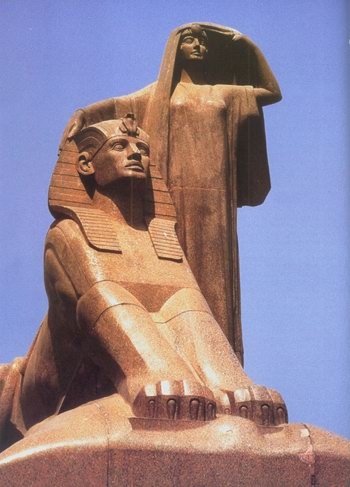
Mahmoud Mukhtar's Egypt's Renaissance 1919-1928, Cairo University Gate

After having lived for almost a quarter of a century in Paris, Henein returned to live in the country of his birth. For over a decade, he produced a number of unique granite sculptures. It was in Aswan, a city that since Antiquity has been famous for its granite quarries, that Henein established the International Sculpture Symposium, of which he was the director from 1996. He was awarded the State Award for the Arts in 1998 and the Mubarak Prize in 2004. He represented Egypt in the Venice Biennale.

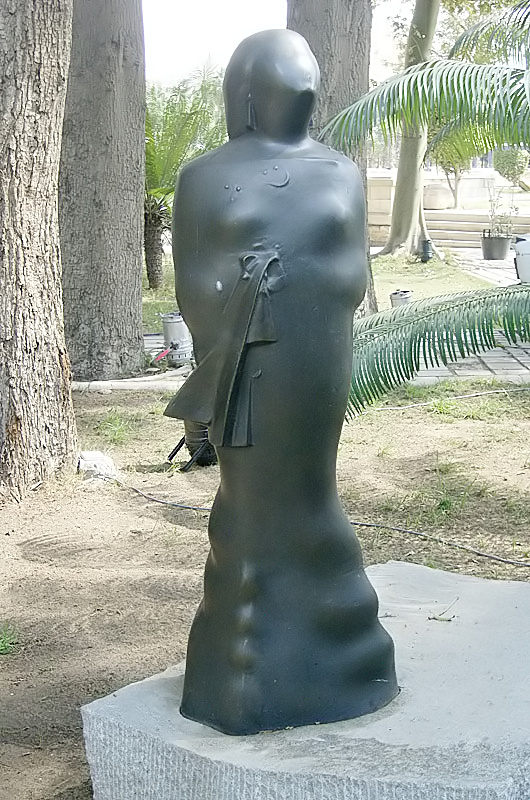
Umm Kulthum sculpture

Henein has had one-person exhibitions in Alexandria, Amsterdam, Cairo, London, Nantes, Munich, Paris and Rome. He participated in group exhibitions in Cairo, Calais, Casablanca, Dakar, Ljubliana, Naples, Sorrento and Spoleto. His commissioned works are in public buildings in Egypt, Italy and Saudi Arabia. Henein resided in Cairo, Egypt. His work was also showcased at New York’s Metropolitan Museum of Art.

Henein received Egypt’s State Medal, the State Merit Award, and the Mubarak Award in art. He also established the International Granite Sculpture Symposium in Aswan. El-Shorouk Publishing House and Skira Publishing Group published a complete book about his life and works.

== Restoration of the Sphinx ==
Due to extreme wear, a restoration project on the Great Sphinx began in 1982 beginning with investigations into its structure and material, then attachment of concrete and stone to the front paws of the Sphinx. This proved to cause more damage to the Sphinx, and restoration was put on hold.

In 1989 Henein, in addition to other artists and antiquity experts, was called from Paris to join the restoration work with the intention of offering his expertise in sculpture in order to determine how to care for the statue most effectively. Henein is quoted commenting on the importance of the project saying "To me, he is the soul of Egypt. He embodies everything about the country with such skill that even if you don't know anything about Egypt, you will understand it by looking at the Sphinx."

The restoration efforts put in by Henein and fellow experts proved successful in restoring the Sphinx, and in 1998 he was decorated for his service by the Egyptian government.

== Adam Henein Museum ==
The Adam Henein Museum opened 18 January 2014 in Cairo's Al-Harraniya district and was designed by fellow artist and architect Ramses Wissa Wassef, originally to function as Henein's personal home.

The interior of the museum contains 3 different floors all displaying sculptures as well as paintings from the artist, and is the largest collection of Henein’s artistic work. The outside garden combines Henein's sculptural work and the natural world to create a unique viewing experience that blends Henein's work into the atmosphere of the Al-Harraniya district.

Throughout the years the Adam Henein Museum has functioned as an important site of Arab modernist sculpture and as a testament to the influence of his body of work, which the artist interweaves with universal themes and references to Egyptian icons such as pyramids, obelisks, Pharaonic kings and hieroglyphs.

== See also ==
- List of Egyptians
- Ramses Wissa Wassef
