= Wassef Boutros-Ghali =

Egyptian architect and painter (1924–2023)

- Born: 1924; Cairo, Egypt
- Died: March 15, 2023 (aged 98–99); Cairo, Egypt
- Occupations: Architect, painter
- Relatives: Boutros Boutros-Ghali (brother)

Wassef Boutros-Ghali (1924 - March 15, 2023) was an Egyptian architect and painter. Born in Cairo into the prominent Coptic Christian Boutros-Ghali family, he was the brother of Boutros Boutros-Ghali, who served as the sixth Secretary-General of the United Nations, and a grandson of Boutros Ghali, who was prime minister of Egypt from 1908 to 1910.

Trained as an architect at Cairo University, Boutros-Ghali built in a modernist idiom in Egypt, Sudan, Ethiopia, Saudi Arabia and Kuwait, and from 1970 worked as a technical adviser to the United Nations Development Programme on questions of urbanism and the environment. In parallel he maintained a private painting practice from his adolescence. His canvases, characterised by saturated colour and geometric abstraction informed by his architectural training, received their first significant public exposure only in 2019, four years before his death. He also presided over the Société d'Archéologie Copte from 1988.

== Architecture ==
Boutros-Ghali's first completed project was Dar El Nil, a modernist apartment building on the bank of the Nile in Cairo, completed in 1950 when he was twenty-six. The design, in an international modernist vocabulary, was unusual in Egypt at the time.

Following the Egyptian revolution of 1952 and the agrarian reforms of the Nasser era, which reduced the Boutros-Ghali family's landholdings, he opened an architectural office in Khartoum in Sudan in 1960. He moved to Rome in 1963 and to New York in 1971. In 1969 he advised UNESCO on the conservation of the medina of Tunis, and in 1970 on the protection of monuments in Algeria. The same year he was appointed principal technical adviser to the United Nations Development Programme (UNDP) for environment and urbanism, working on housing, planning and construction in Egypt, Ethiopia, Saudi Arabia, Kuwait and Sudan. He retired from the UNDP in 1984.
