= Yuhanna al-Armani =

Egyptian iconographer (1720–1786)

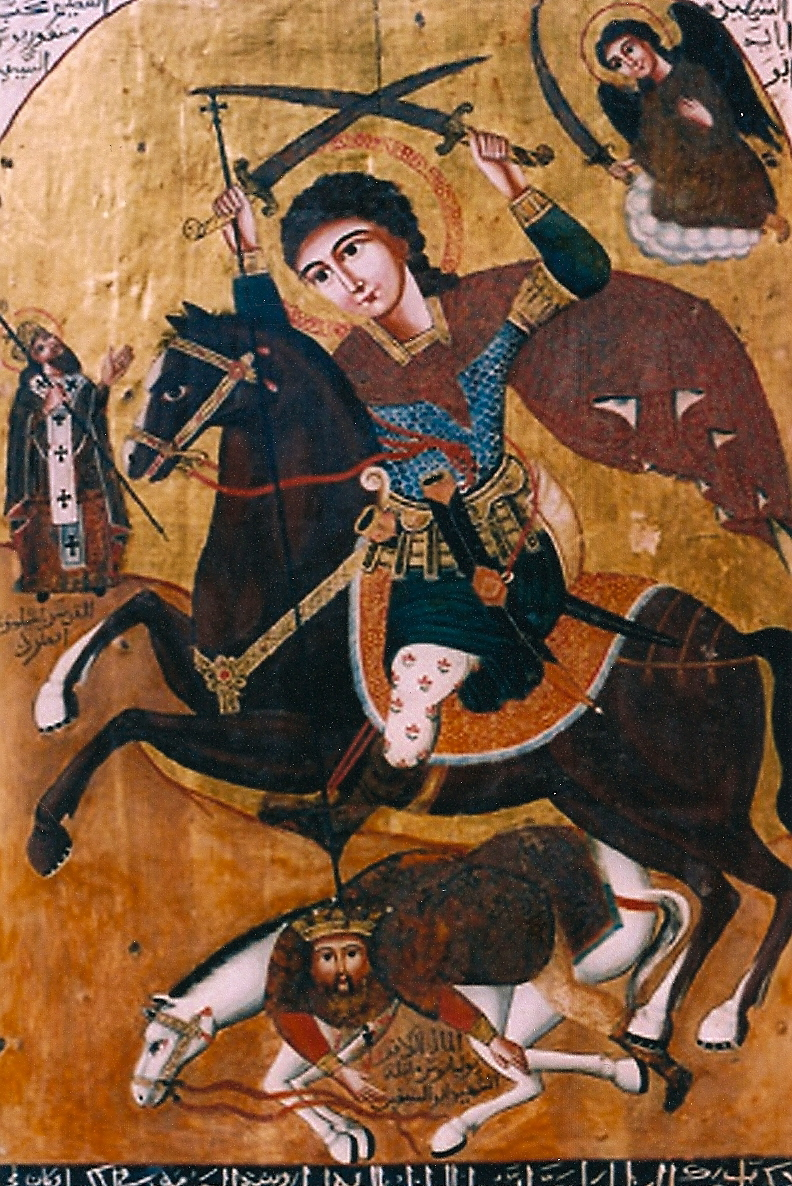
- Icon of St Mercurius by Yuhanna al-Armani
- Born: Yuhanna al-Armani al-Qudsi cca 1720
- Died: 1786; Cairo, Ottoman Empire
- Known for: Religious Painting
- Notable work: Icons in The Hanging Church, Coptic Cairo
- Movement: Coptic Art

Yuhanna al-Armani al-Qudsi (1726 – 1786, Cairo, Ottoman Empire) was an artist of Armenian origin in Ottoman Egypt. He is most notable for his religious works, especially his Coptic icons that decorate The Hanging Church in Old Cairo.

== Biography ==
=== Life ===
Originally born Ohem Karapetian in 1726 to an Armenian family residing in Jerusalem, he would later change his first name to the more well-known Arabic pronunciation, Yuhanna, and almost completely omit his given surname upon moving to Cairo. In its stead, he would add al-Armani and al-Qudsi paying homage to both his Armenian heritage and his home town of Jerusalem. Yuhanna died in Cairo in 1786.

=== Career ===
Yuhanna worked in the Egyptian Coptic style of Icon painting, which at that point was an endangered art style due to periods of tense relationships with the Muslim majority which also affected other aspects of Coptic culture such as the Coptic language. However, in the 18th century, there was a decline of Ottoman power in Egypt, as well as a shift in the Ottomans' policy towards non-Muslim Copts and Christians were able to exert a greater social presence which made a revival of the style possible. Yuhanna's artistic career was a successful, and characterized by a close partnership with another Coptic icon painter known as Ibrahim al-Nasikh (also known as Ibrahim the scribe) whom Yuhanna may have shared a workshop and collaborated with on some works which is reflected in their art sharing many stylistic similarities. There is some debate over the actual nature of their partnership, and evidence pointing to them having more of a master-apprentice relationship, with Ibrahim being the master and Yuhanna as the apprentice. Their combined artistic style is influenced and informed by post-Byzantine as well as Syrio-Palestinian style icons. This influence can be seen in one of the more iconic aspects of their style which is the use of written text alongside the visuals, which functions as narration of the scene and provides additional information such as names of the saints. Their subject matter also featured more regionally-specific Egyptian motifs such as mounted warrior saints, which appear numerous times both in their work as well as in the work of other Egyptian Coptic icon painters.

== Art work ==
=== Icon of St. George (Mari Girgis), 1753 ===
Mari Girgis is a painted wooden icon depicting a mounted man in armor, presumably St. George, accompanied by two much smaller figures the moment that he is about to deliver the final blow defeating the dragon and saving the princess. There is also the inclusion of Arabic and Coptic script at the top of the piece as well as at the bottom a mainstay of Yuhanna and Ibrahims style as well as indicative of post-Byzantine and Syrio-Palestinian influence. This piece, like all Icons, was created as a devotional piece to St. George.

=== Icon of St Behnam (Mari Bihnam) and his sister St Sarah (Sarra), 1782 ===
This piece is a painted wooden Icon seemingly depicting multiple narrative scenes with the largest and central scene most likely being the scene of great importance. The central scene depicts a man of monumental size, presumable St. Behnam, with a crown, a Halo, and wearing fine clothing riding a horse facing the left hand side of the piece. The much smaller scenes depicting groups of people enacting various actions such as an army marching or people being anointed. The piece also includes the Arabic and Coptic script typical of Yuhanna and Ibrahims style. This pieces intention was to tell the story of St. Benham.

=== Icon of St Onoprius (Abu Nofer) and the Ethiopian monk St Takla Haymanot, 1754 ===
This piece is painted linen Icon on a wooden frame seemingly depicting two men one dressed in a plain tunic with unkempt hair and beard holding a cross and the other man dressed in traditional Coptic dress holding a cane and a book. The piece also includes sporadic Arabic and Coptic script typical of Yuhanna and Ibrahims style. The piece was intended to be a devotional piece to these two saints.
