= Jean Clédat =

French Egyptologist (1871–1943)

- Born: 7 May 1871; Périgueux, France
- Died: 29 July 1943 (aged 72)
- Occupations: Egyptologist; Archaeologist; Philologist
- Organization: French Institute of Oriental Archaeology

Jean Clédat (7 May 1871 – 29 July 1943) was a French Egyptologist, archaeologist and philologist. He became a resident at the Institut Français d'Archéologie Orientale (French Institute of Oriental Archaeology). At various times, Clédat's expeditions was sponsored by Compagnie universelle du canal maritime de Suez (the Suez Canal Company), the Supreme Council of Antiquities, the Comité, and the Institut itself.

== Biography ==
Clédat was born in Périgueux in 1871. Thanks to the archaeological program instilled by Gaston Maspero, head of Egyptian Antiquities, Clédat was sent in search of Christian monuments of Egypt. In 1901, he began excavating Bawit (French: Baouît) and in the winter of 1903–4, he uncovered the Bawit monastery of Apa Apollo, founded in the fourth century. He made further excavations at Bawit until 1905; the ostraca and papyri that he unearthed are now housed in the Musee du Perigord and the Ismalia Museum. He was responsible for excavating many prestigious archaeological sites in Egypt, including Deir Abu Hennis, St. Simeon Monastery, Aswan, Asyut, Akhmim, Sohag, Luxor, Elephantine, Tell el-Herr, Tell el-Maskhouta, Mahemdiah and El Qantara. At Qasr-Gheit (North Sinai), Clédat concluded that it had been a Nabataean station on a secondary caravan route from Arabia to Egypt.

"In the Revue Mensuelle de l'Ecole d'Anthropologie de Paris (Vol. IX., 1899, pp. 201–226), Cledat discusses the difficult and dangerous problem of "Egyptian Origins." According to Cledat, the fellah of today hardly represents the true ancient Egyptian type, which already in the time of the great Ramses had come to be quite mixed. The autocthones of Egypt, Cledat thinks, were negroes upon which "Ethiopians, i.e. Egyptians, intruded". (The American antiquarian and oriental journal, 1909)

In the second half of 1904, Prince Augustus of Arenberg, on behalf of the Board of Directors of the Compagnie universelle du canal maritime de Suez, committed Clédat as director of the company's archaeological excavations. In 1910, Clédat excavated at Pelusium in Tell el-Farama, and made a sketch map of the site and also discovered an inscription mentioning Emperor Hadrian. At various times, Clédat's expeditions were sponsored by others, including the Supreme Council of Antiquities, the Comite, and the Institut Français d'Archéologie Orientale.

Clédat was a prolific author. In his essay, "Pour la Conquête de l'Egypte" (1919), he described Egyptian methods of defense and offense upon the present Suez Canal route in ancient times. In Notes sur l'isthme de Suez (1910), the remains of a Byzantine fortress at the same locality are illustrated by a plan, and the Israelite passage of the Red Sea includes an excellent map. Clédat was quite well known for his drawings and outlines. He was a talented artist, and regularly published his work, leaving valuable books still being studied today. After his death in 1943, his archives were donated to the Louvre by his daughter. A street is named after him in his hometown.

== Partial works ==
- Le monastère et la nécropole de Baouît, 3 Bände, Le Caire : Imprimerie de l'Inst. Français d'Archéologie Orientale, 1904–1999.
- La comtesse de Montignac poème humorist. en patois périgourdin é; avec le texte franç. en regard et notes explicat (1872)
- Le tombeau de la Dame Amten (1898)
- Observations sur deux tableaux ethnographiques égyptiens (1899)
- Origines égyptiennes (1899)
- La médecine chez les anciens Egyptiens (1899)
- Rapport sur une mission au canal de Suez (Octobre 1900) (1901)
- Notes sur la nécropole de Bersheh (1901)
- Notes sur quelques figures égyptiennes (1901)
- Notes archéologiques et philologiques (1902)
- Recherches sur le kôm de Baouit (1902)
- Nouvelles recherches à Baouit (Haute-Egypte) : campagnes 1903–1904 (1904)
- Notes sur l'isthme de Suez. 2, Le Djebel Maryam (1910)
- Deux monuments nouveaux de Tell el-Maskhoutah (1910)
- Fouilles à Qasr-Gheit (Mai 1911) (1911)
- Les vases de El-Béda (1913)
- Le temple de Zeus Cassios à Péluse (1913)
- Fouilles à Cheikh Zouède : janvier-février 1913 (1915)
- Les inscriptions de Saint-Siméon (1915)
- Nécropole de Qantarah (fouilles de mai 1914) (1916)
- Pour la conquête de l'Egypte (1919)
- Le raid du roi Baudoin 1er en Egypte (1925)

== Literature ==
- L'Égypte en Périgord. Dans les pas de Jean Clédat. Catalogue raisonné de l'exposition., Paris – Louvain, Editions Peeters, 1991, S. 1–17.
- Dawson, Warren R.; Uphill, Eric P.; Bierbrier, M. L., Who was who in Egyptology, London : The Egypt Exploration Society, 1995 (3. Auflage), S. 101.
