= Leonid Uspensky =

Russian icon painter and art historian

Leonid Alexandrovich Uspensky (Russian: Леонид Александрович Успенский, French: Léonide Ouspensky; 1902–1987) was a famous Russian icon painter and art historian.

He was born in 1902 on his father's estate in the village of Golaia Snova (now Golosnovka) in the north of the Voronezh region in Russia and died in 1987.

Ouspensky specialised in both the painting and study of icons. He studied and taught art in Paris.

One of his students was the Egyptian Coptic icon painter and scholar Isaac Fanous.
