= Abib and Apollo =

4th century Egyptian Christian ascetics

Saints Abib and Apollo

Monks
- Born: 4th century Akhmim, Egypt
- Died: November 4 (4th century); Egypt
- Venerated in: Coptic Orthodox Church; Armenian Apostolic Church; Ethiopian Orthodox Church; Syriac Orthodox Church; Oriental Orthodoxy
- Feast: November 4

Abib and Apollo were two Christian ascetics from Akhmim, Egypt. They are mentioned in the Synaxarion, das ist der Heiligen-Kalendar der Koptischen Christen. Their feast day is celebrated on November 4 (25 Baba).

== History ==
Apollo (also called Apollonios) was born in the City of Akhmim. His father's name was Amani (Hamai) and his mother's name was Eyse (Isa). From his early years Apollo grew and developed in saintliness, studying the subjects of Divinity. He was prepared from his youth to his life in a monastery. This decision was confirmed when he met a friend Abib and together they joined the monastery in Upper Egypt and became monks. They both tended to ascetic works and their life was full of good deeds.

Abib became a deacon and later died. Apollo, distressed, moved deeper into the desert, near Mount Abluj, followed by a group of ascetics. Macarius of Egypt wrote a letter to Apollo to confirm him and the monastery in their good works. Apollo knew by the spirit that Macarius was writing them a letter and the time at which the letter was actually being drafted. He said to his followers: "Listen my brethren, behold the great Abba Macarius is writing to us a letter full of comforting and spiritual teachings." Apollo was the one who went to Ammonius and was one of the witnesses who saw the holy woman that "stood in the middle of the fire but did not burn".

== "Historia Monachorum" of the archdeacon Timothy of Alexandria ==
The author of the Historia Monachorum in Aegypto, the archdeacon Timothy of Alexandria (around 400), whose Latin translation of Rufinus was equally published by Rosweyde as book II of the Vitae Patrum, recounts the visit he made with his companions to Apollo. According to his recollections Apollo lived in the Tebaide, in the region of Hermopolis (today Asmunayn), not far from the sanctuary of Dayr Al-Muharrag. From this book it appears that after forty years, at the call of an angel, Apollo approached the inhabited places while continuing his life in an isolated cave. This happened under the reign of Julian the Apostate (361-363 AD). His reputation for sanctity quickly attracted numerous disciples around him, who built an immense monastery: 500 monks were there at the time of Timothy's visit.

== Sources ==
- Holweck, F. G. A Biographical Dictionary of the Saints. St. Louis, MO: B. Herder Book Co. 1924.
- Budge, Sir E.A.Wallis (1976). the book of the saints of the Ethiopian church, Vol 1. Cambridge: CUP Archive. p. 192.
