= Ramses Wissa Wassef =

Egyptian architect and professor

- Born: 1911; Cairo, Egypt
- Died: 1974 (aged 62–63)
- Education: École des Beaux-Arts de Paris
- Occupations: Architect and professor of art and architecture
- Buildings: Ramses Wissa Wassef Art Centre

Ramses Wissa Wassef (1911–1974) was an Egyptian architect and professor of art and architecture at the College of Fine Arts in Cairo and founder of the Ramses Wissa Wassef Art Center. His architectural work included private villas and rural houses as well as churches, schools and museums. His designs drew on Egypt’s Pharaonic, Coptic and Islamic architectural traditions and made use of local materials such as adobe and stone to respond to climatic conditions.

== Biography ==
Ramses Wissa Wassef was born in Cairo to a Coptic family. His father was a lawyer, a leader of Egypt's nationalist movement and an art patron who promoted the development of the arts in Egypt. After high school, Wassef wanted to become a sculptor but changed his mind and studied architecture in France at the Ecole des Beaux-Arts de Paris. His thesis project "A Potter's House in Old Cairo" received the first prize in 1935. He had a passion for beauty in form and believed "one cannot separate beauty from utility, the form from the material, the work from its function, man from his creative art "

After Wassef's death, his family donated his original architectural drawings to the Rare Books and Special Collections Library at the American University in Cairo.

== Architectural and design career ==
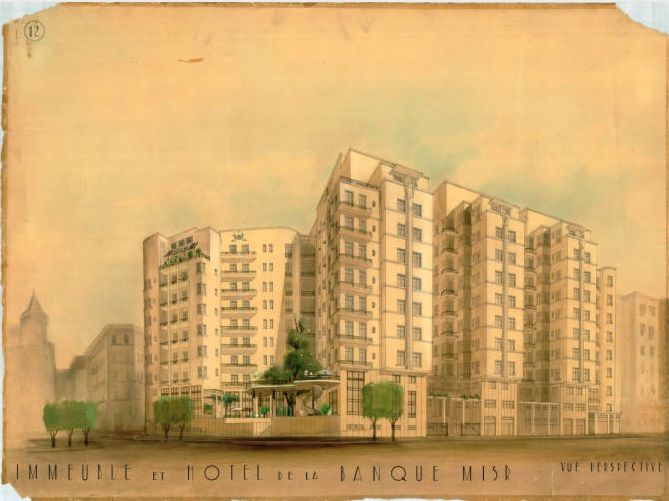
Banque Misr Building and Hotel at Opera Square - Perspective

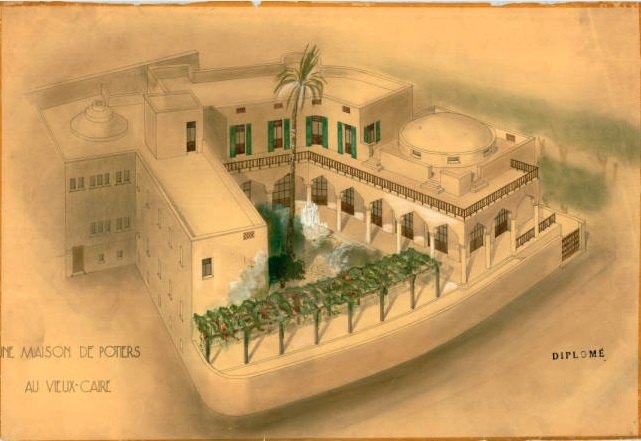
Old Cairo Potter's House

At the beginning of his career in 1935, Wassef was struck by the beauty of the medieval towns and the old quarters of Cairo. He felt that ancient craftsmen had managed to derive from their traditional heritage an infinite variety of expression and created effects distinguished by local character. He developed an architectural style that bore the stamp of his own strong personality and responded to the challenge of the times without breaking away from the past. Impressed as he was by the beauty of the Nubian houses in the villages around Aswan, which still preserved the domes and vaults, inherited from the earliest Pharaonic dynasties, he resolved to maintain their presence in his own architectural work for reasons of aesthetics, climate and economics. He made use of traditional craftsmen such as stonecutters, traditional carpenters, glass blowers and potters who had inherited the techniques and traditions of the Egyptian vernacular heritage. While many of his designs incorporated domes and other traditional elements of Egyptian architecture into contemporary buildings, his archive also includes works in other styles, including Art Deco. Wassef taught architecture and art at the Department of Architecture, College of Fine Arts, Cairo, which he also chaired.

== Designs ==
- Potter's House in Old Cairo
- French College of Daher
- French School of Cairo
- Mahmoud Mokhtar Sculpture Museum (30°2′25.8″N 31°13′22.3″E), Cairo
- Saint Mary Coptic Church in Zamalek, Cairo
- Several churches in Cairo, Alexandria and Damanhour, including the Church of St. George in Heliopolis
- The Junior Lycee school at Bab al-Louq Cairo
- His home in Agouza, Cairo and several private houses along the Saqqara road near the Pyramids
- Adam Henein House, Harrania Giza. Adam Henein was his student at the College of Fine Arts in Cairo.
- Ramses Wissa Wassef Art Center compound, Harrania Giza, including tapestry workshops and gallery, the Habib Georgi sculpture museum.

== Ramses Wissa Wassef Art Centre ==
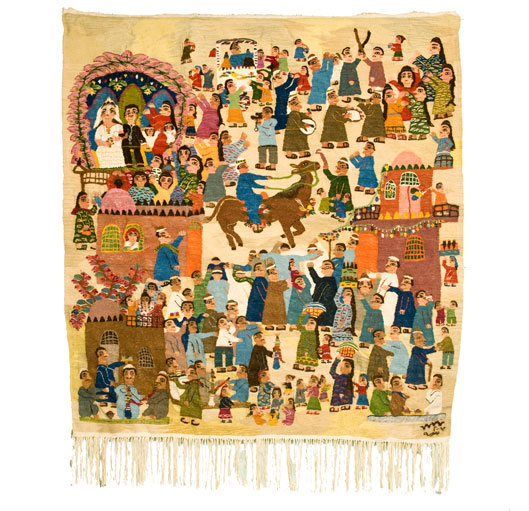
Wedding in the Village — woven in 2007 at the Art Centre by Basima Mohamed. Collection of The Children's Museum of Indianapolis.

Wissa Wassef founded the Ramses Wissa Wassef Art Centre in 1951, located in the Harrania district of Giza, near the Giza pyramids in the Greater Cairo region. He established it to teach young Egyptian villagers how to create art, including tapestries. He believed that children are endowed with creative power and potential. Wissa Wassef wanted to prove that artistic creativity is innate in everyone, and regardless of deadening influences from mass-produced objects, it can flourish within supportive settings such as the Art Centre.

The Ramses Wissa Wassef Art Centre won the Aga Khan Award for Architecture from the Aga Khan Development Network in 1983. The Art Centre is open to the public, with an art museum exhibiting its early tapestry works, and a museum shop selling contemporary tapestry works by Art Centre artists. Tours are available, upon contacting the Art Centre in advance to schedule.

The Ramses Wissa Wassef Art Centre has operated continuously since opening in 1951, with its artists creating tapestries there for over 60 years. The Centre's artists create the designs and weave the tapestries directly from their imaginations onto the looms. Pre-designed patterns have never been used, supporting Wissa Wassef's belief that artistic creativity is intrinsic, and can be expressed when a supportive context is available.

The renowned textile artists Ali Selim and Karima Ali, who began as children at the Centre in the 1960s and 1970s, continue to weave tapestry masterworks, now up to 10 feet (3.0 m) in width.

== Exhibitions ==
The tapestries have been internationally recognized since the late 1950s. Many exhibitions have been held in Europe and the Smithsonian Institution organized a traveling exhibit in the USA in 1975-76. The most recent exhibition was at the Coningsby Gallery in London, UK, during November 2012. A simple paperback catalog was published for the 2006 for an exhibition at the School of Oriental and African Studies in the University of London to mark the center's 50th anniversary. "Egyptian Landscapes" is a book of photographs that highlights the work of the center.

1954 - Organized by the group Amities Francaises, Cairo, Alexandria and Ismallia, Egypt

1954 - Egyptian Art Exhibition, Italy

1956 - The Near East College Association, New York, USA

1958 - Gewerbemuseum, Zurich & Basel, Switzerland

1959 - Bildteppiche, Krefeild, Germany

1960 - Museum of Modern Art, Stockholm, Sweden

1961 - Kunstindustrimusset, Germany

1961 - National Museum of Modern Art, Stockholm, Gothenburg, Malmo, Sweden

1962 - Fodor Museum, Amsterdam, the Netherlands

1963 - Museum Am ost Wall Dortmund, Munich, Germany

1964 - Stedelijk Museum, Groninger Museum Voor Stad en Lande, The Netherlands

1964 - Neue Sammlung Munchen, Munich, Germany

1965 - Musee D’ Arts Decoratifs, Rosenthal Studio-Haus-Delvaux, Paris, France

1966 - Museum of Modern Art, Skovde Konsthall Skovde, Stockholm, Lunds, Sweden

1966 - Congress Mondial, Prague, Czechoslovakia

1967 - Musee D’Arts Decoratifs, Lausanne, Switzerland

1967 - Museum of Modern Art, Stockholm, Sweden

1969 - Royal College of Art, London, England

1971 - Gallery Brand Strupp, Oslo, Norway

1972 - Ideal Home Exhibition, London, England

1973 - Gallery La Demeure, Paris, France

1974 - Al Palazzo Dellarejario, Milan, Italy

1975 - New York Natural History Museum, New York City, USA

1975 - Textile Museum, Washington, DC, USA

1975 - Gallery La Demeure, Paris, France

1977 - Italian Culture Centre, Cairo, Egypt

1978 - Touring exhibition, Berlin, Essen, Stuttgart, Germany

1978 - Gallery La Demeure, Paris, France

1979 - Roemer - und Pelizaeus - Museum, Hildesheim, Germany

1979 - Anneberg Gallery, San Francisco, USA

1979 - Modern Art Museum, Stockholm, Sweden

1981 - University of Southern California, Los Angeles, USA

1981 - Egyptian Art Academy, Rome, Italy

1985 - The Barbican Centre, London, UK

1985 - Polytechnic Gallery, Newcastle, UK

1986 - ArtSpace, Aberdeen, UK

1986 - City of Edinburgh Art Centre, Edinburgh, UK

1986 - Glynn Vivian Art Gallery, Swansea, Wales, UK

1990 - First Tapestry Triennale, Tournai, Belgium

1991 - Musee Jean Lurcat, Angers, France

1993 - Institut Du Monde Arabe, Paris, France

1995 - Culture Centre, Ha, Norway

1995 - Lebanese/ Egyptian Businessmen’s Association, Beirut, Lebanon

1999 - Egyptian Culture week, Tones, Tunisia

2000 - United Nations, Geneva, Switzerland

2001 - Conservatoire et Jardin Botanique, Geneva, Switzerland

2003 - Green Art Gallery, Dubai, UAE

2004 - Frankfurt Book Fair, Frankfurt, Germany

2006 - Brunei Gallery, SOAS, University of London, London, UK

2009 - Nature in Art Trust, Gloucestershire, UK

2012 - Children's Museum, Take Me There: Egypt!, Indianapolis, USA

2012 - The Coningsby Gallery, London, UK

== Publications ==
In 1961, renowned photographer Werner Forman discovered the Art Centre by accident while shooting in Egypt. Forman and later his archive staff have been a primary international ambassador for the tapestries. He published two books available online for used book sellers.

"Tapestries from Egypt" by Ramses Wissa Wassef and Werner Forman, 1961, Hamlin Publishing Group
"Woven by Hand" by Ramses Wissa Wassef and Werner Forman, 1972, Hamlin Publishing Group

Other Publications
"Egyptian Tapestries from the Workshop of Ramses Wissa Wassef: An Experiment in Creativity" by Ceres Wissa Wassef, 1975, Smithsonian Institution Traveling Exhibition Service
"Das Land am Nil" by Arne Eggebrecht, Eva Eggebrecht, Wilfried Seipel, 1979, Roemer- und Pelizaeus-Museum, Hildesheim
"Egyptian Landscapes, 1985" by Yoanna Wissa Wassef and Hilary Weir, 1985, Ramses Wissa Wassef (UK) Exhibition Foundation
"Egyptian Landscapes, 2006" by Suzanne Wissa Wassef, Yoanna Wissa Wassef and Hillary Weir, 2006, Ramses Wissa Wassef (UK) Exhibition Trust

== Awards ==
- Egyptian National Award For The Arts - 1961, for his stained-glass window designs for The Egyptian National Assembly building, Cairo
- The Aga-Khan Architectural Award - 1983, for his achievements and particularly for the art center at Harrania, Giza

== See also ==
- List of Egyptian architects
