= Ramses Wissa Wassef Art Center =

Egyptian crafts school and cooperative

- Ramses Wissa Wassef Art Center
- Established: 1951; 75 years ago
- Founders: Ramses Wissa Wassef, Susanne Wassef
- Founded at: Harrania
- Legal status: Cooperative
- Purpose: traditional crafts school and museum
- Location: Harrania, Egypt

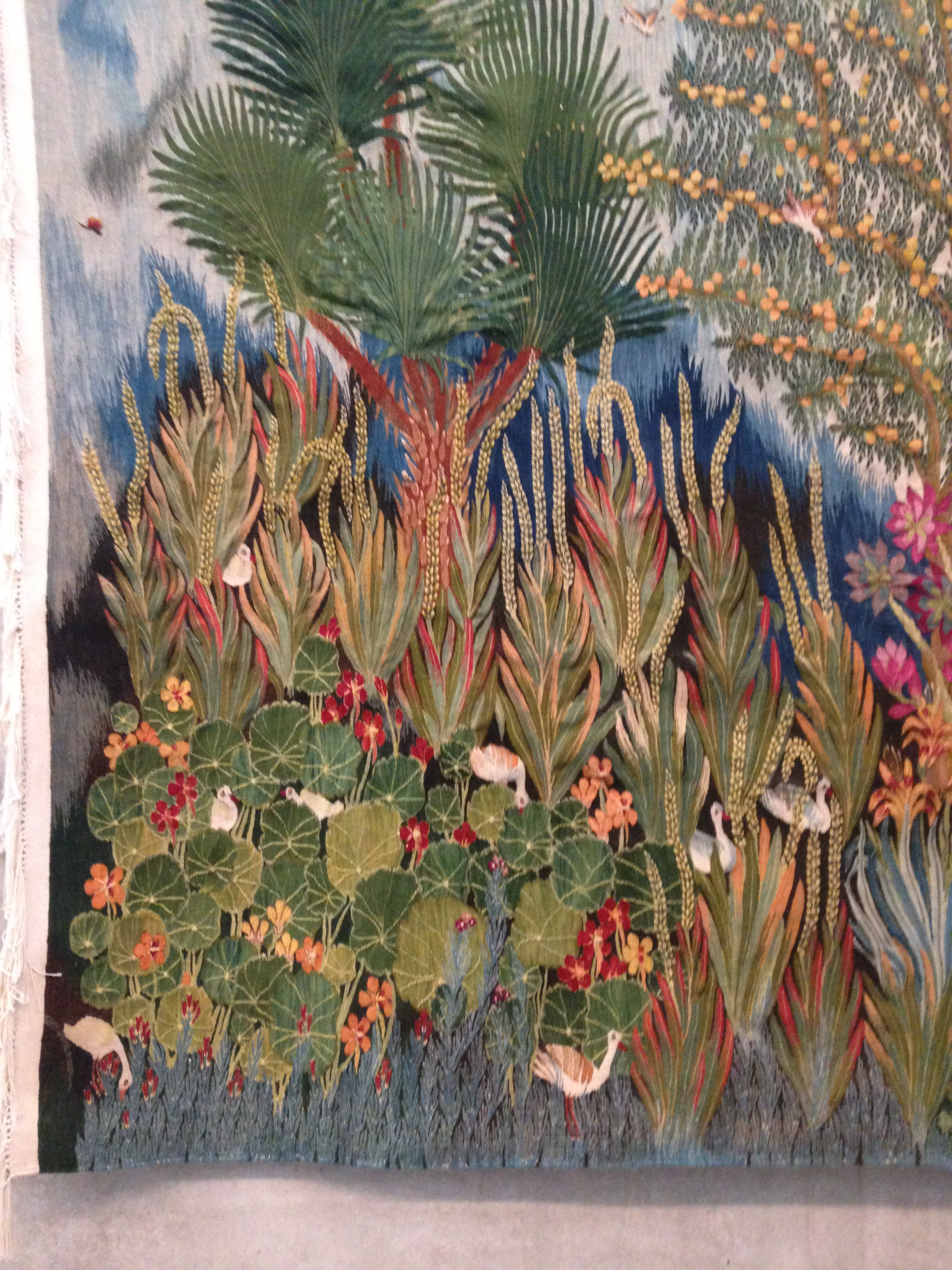
Reseda and Cactus, section, Sabra Saoid, wool, 3,30 × 1,85 m

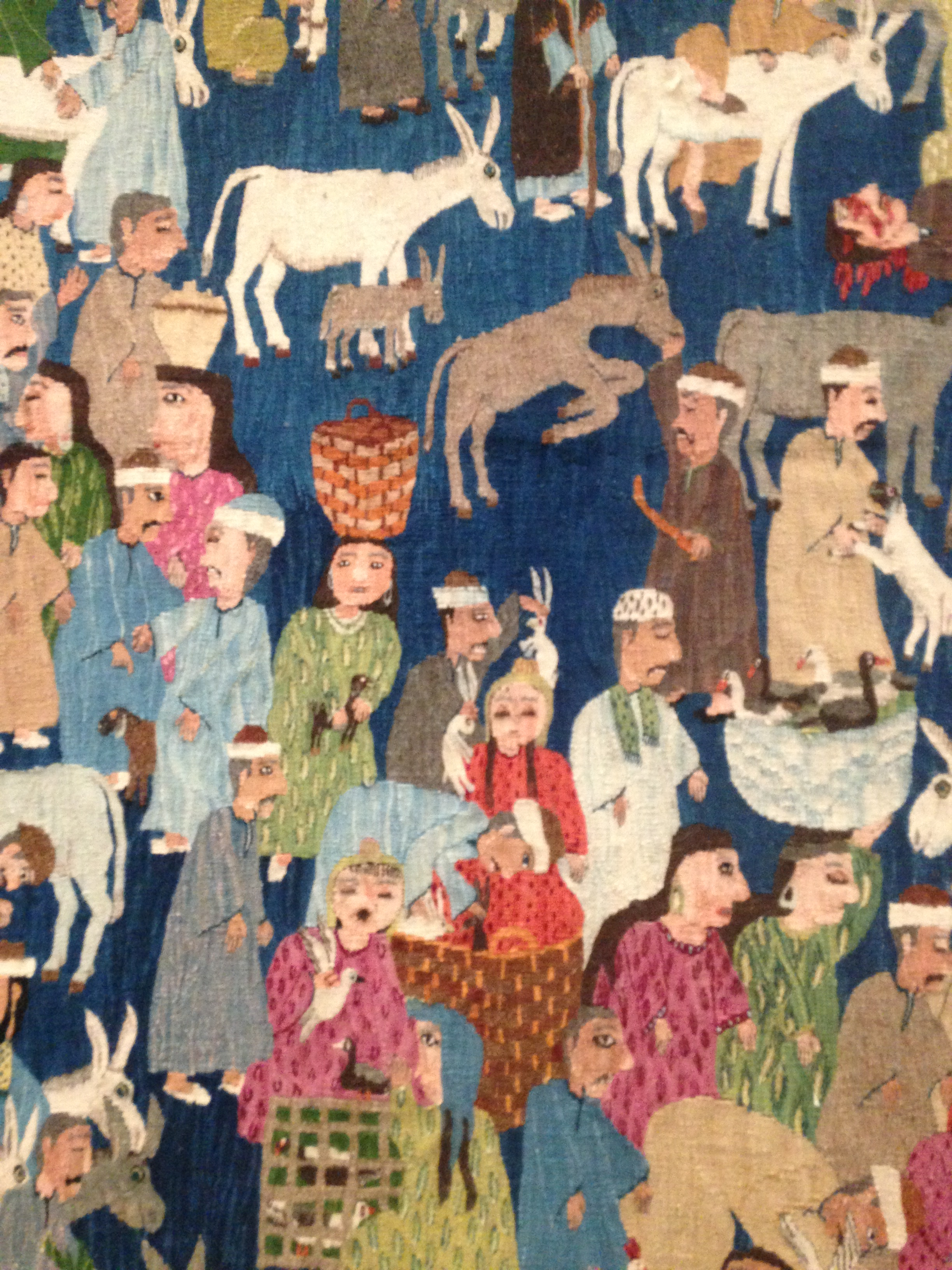
Donkey market, section, wool, Sayed Mahmoud, 2,50 × 1,50 m

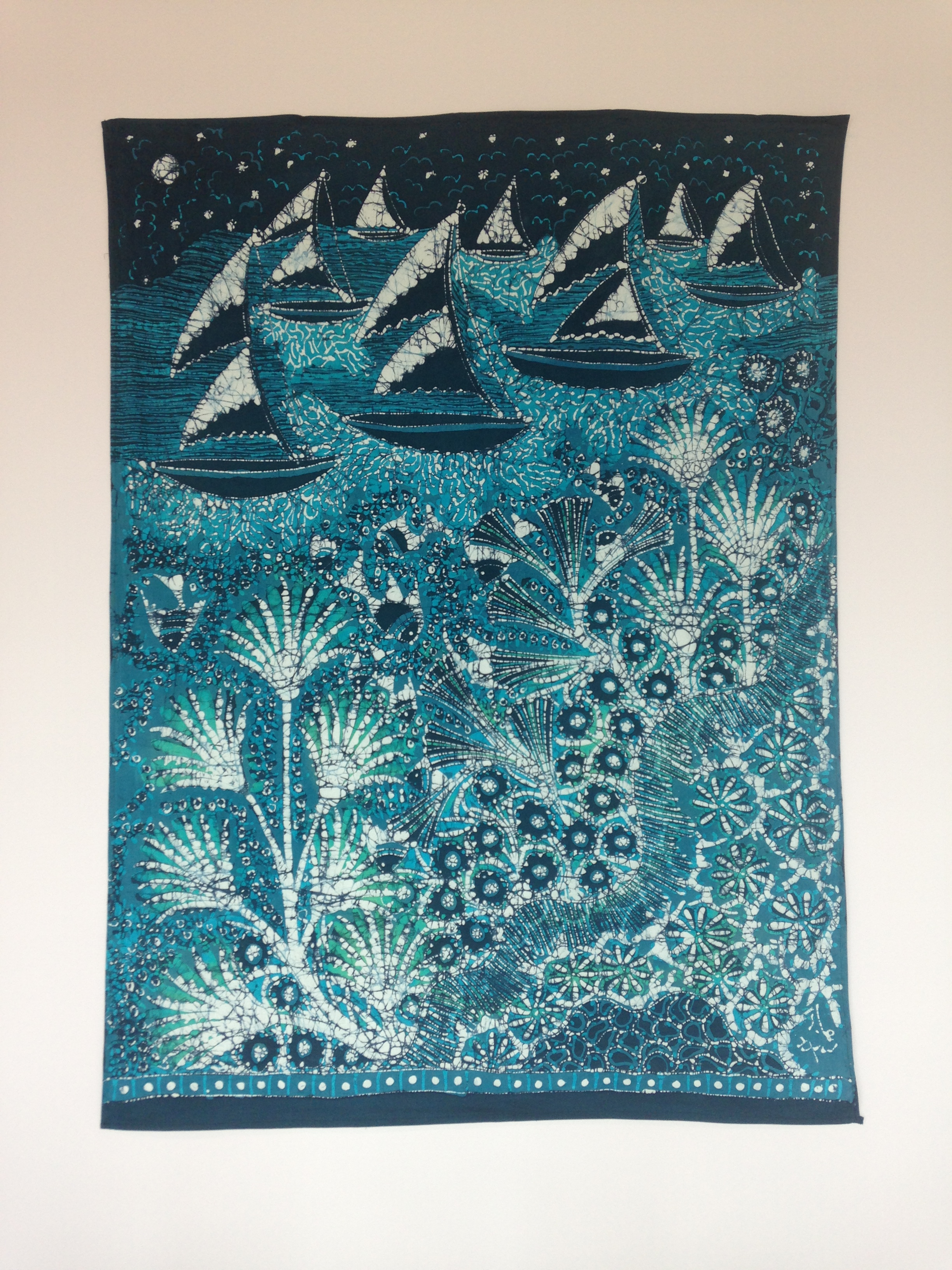
Feluccas on the Nile, Saber Ibrahim, 1,45 × 1,95 m

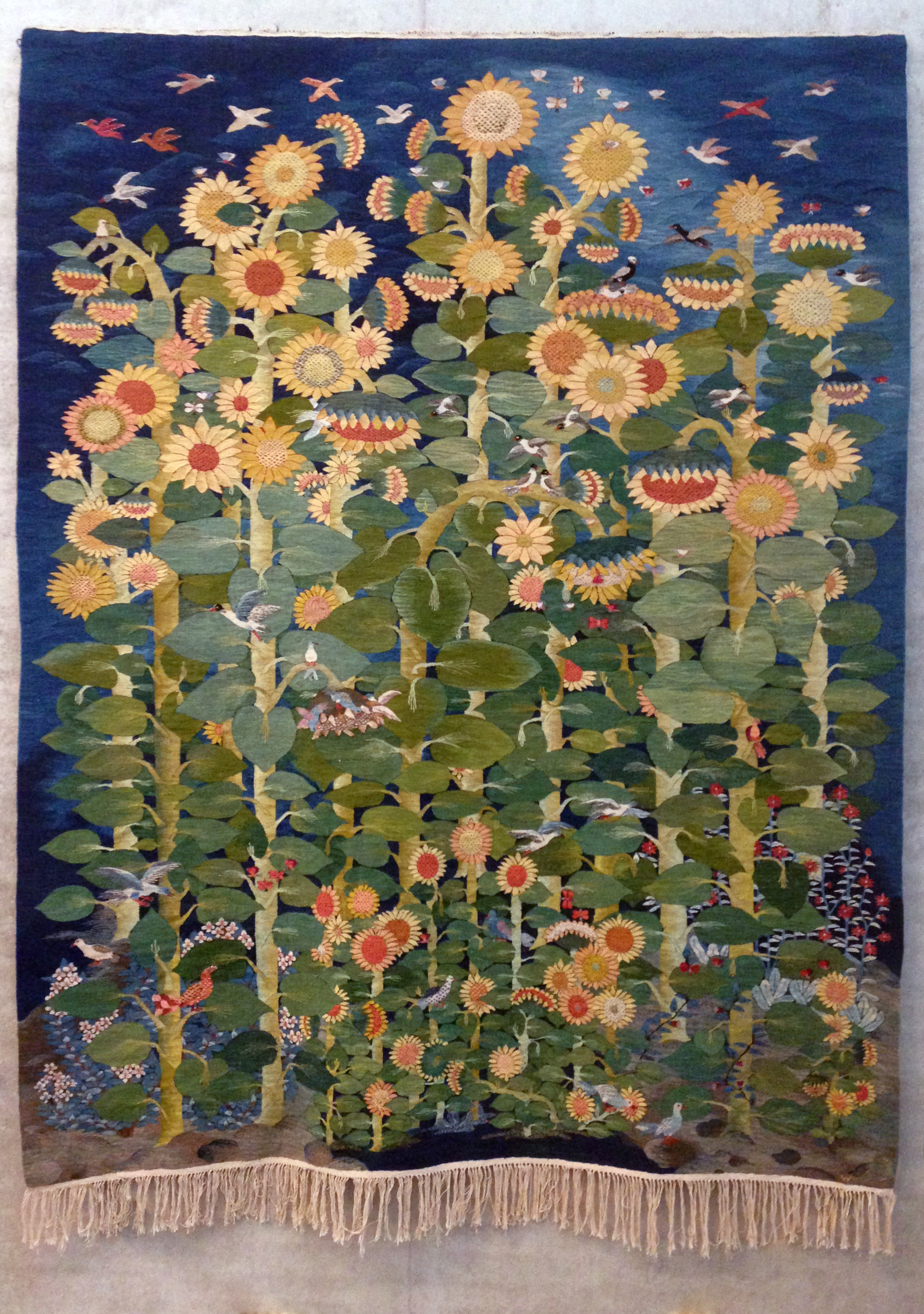
Sun flowers, wool, Sayed Mahmoud, 2,10 × 2,60 m

The Ramses Wissa Wassef Art Center is located in Harrania, Egypt, in a suburb of Cairo, near the Pyramids of Giza. It was founded in 1951 by architect Ramses Wissa Wassef and his wife Sophie, an art teacher, as a school and training center for children and young people from the surrounding villages and operates as a cooperative.

== Philosophy ==
After the couple had purchased a large plot of land in what was then still a rural area of Harrania, workshops and residential buildings were constructed there using traditional mud brick construction methods based on plans by Ramses Wissa Wassef. The architect took his inspiration from the Nubian mud brick buildings in the Aswan region and their domed and vaulted roofs. In doing so, he drew on Egypt's architectural heritage, which has Roman, Coptic, and Islamic roots and is therefore perfectly adapted to the climatic conditions.

Ramses Wissa Wassef also wanted to do something to preserve his country's traditional crafts, which were already in danger of falling into oblivion at that time. And he planned to revive these ancient arts in workshops with the help of young people. To achieve this, he took an unusual approach. Based on his observations, Ramses saw in every young person the potential for their own creative abilities, which, in his opinion, should be allowed to develop freely, independent of any influence from teachers or artistic trends. The slow process of weaving on a loom made this technique ideal for turning Ramses's ideas into reality. He established specific conditions that would allow children and young people to develop artistically in a protected space, according to their own imagination and at their own pace. Thus, evaluations and criticism during and after the creative process were prohibited, and visits to galleries and museums were also forbidden in order to rule out any artistic influences and fashions. Instead, young artists should be given encouraging, supportive guidance as they create their own works. For Ramses, the focus was never on the end product, but rather on the journey to get there, on the process and on the personal development of the young people involved.

== Life at the Art Center ==
This by the way, is the reason why art speaks a universal language, that it is the means of communication between people.

— Ramses Wissa Wassef

In 1951, the first children and young people were accepted into the workshops and began their artistic work. The youngest of them were 10 years old at the time. At the same time, they continued to attend the local elementary school, which gave them the opportunity to spend time at the Art Center after school. At that time, it was still common for many children to help their parents work in the fields, which meant they were naturally in contact with nature, work processes, and village life. Their observations and experiences thus flowed into their artistic work and inspired their imagination. They were able to devote themselves to the craft of weaving and the creation of highly individual works without any time pressure. Living together at the Art Center, where they ate their meals together and carried out all their activities together, fostered a sense of community and responsible coexistence among them. As a result, many of them remained deeply attached to the Art Center as adults, and some of them continue to practice the crafts of art there to this day.

Today, the center is focusing on preserving the existing buildings, which form an essential part of the Art Center's identity. The planned expansion of the facilities will provide more space for artists and at the same time create the opportunity to welcome even more visitors.

== Batic Fabrics, Carpets & Ceramics ==
Weaving is one of the oldest crafts in Egypt, with the first traces dating back to the 5th millennium BC. In Harrania, carpets today are still woven with respect to the traditional rules and with the same methods as more than 6,000 years ago. The technique used on the looms at the Art Center in Harrania is known as tapestry weaving or picture weaving. However, the tapestries are created without templates, but completely freely during the production process. Another important element is the dyeing of the respective base materials, such as wool or cotton, which the young people perform themselves under supervision. Traditionally, only natural raw materials such as plants or minerals are used. This preparatory work is always part of the creation of a carpet, which means that the production of an object can take a very long time.

In 1965, batik was introduced as another technique. Largely unknown in Egypt, it is a very old traditional method of dyeing textiles in Asia. Wax is used to cover certain patterns before the fabric is dipped in dye. This can be a lengthy process involving different dye baths, e.g., from light to dark, and several stages of wax application to create different patterns. Due to the rapid hardening of the wax and the immersion in different dye baths one after the other, this technique requires faster work than weaving and a clear idea of the desired result. However, no templates are used here either. The batik group has been supervised since 1974 by Johanna Wissa Wassef, one of Ramses and Sophia's daughters. Another art form practiced at the Art Center in Harrania is pottery, which also uses traditional techniques. Since the death of Ramses Wissa Wassef in 1974, the center has been run by his two daughters, Johanna and Suzanne, and her husband Ikram.

Meanwhile, new educational programs and workshops are being developed at the Center for local and international students. By offering new generations the space and opportunity to develop their artistic potential, the legacy of Ramses Wissa Wassef is being carried on.

== Exhibitions ==
The beauty of the resulting works, whether carpets or batik fabrics, enchants the viewer with their enormous colorfulness, the variety of motifs and situations depicted, the attention to detail in the smallest details, and the overall richness and liveliness of the representations. Each of the textile works is unique and individual. The qualities of the objects described soon made the Art Center famous beyond its immediate surroundings and provided the center and its creators with a reliable source of income. This not only ensured the continued existence of the workshops, but also gave the artists financial independence. Word spread, and soon interested visitors from all over the country came to the Art Center to admire the works being created there. In 1989, a museum extension was added to the center, where current works can be viewed. Invitations to other locations, both domestic and abroad, soon followed, making the artworks accessible to an even wider audience. Today, the Art Center in Harrania is known throughout the world, and many of its artworks hang in museums such as the Metropolitan Museum of Modern Art, the British Museum, and the Victoria and Albert Museum in London.

Exhibitions and collaborations with international museums and cultural institutions will remain important for the Art Center in the future in order to make its work known to a global audience.

== Publications ==
- Seyfried, Friederik; Regulski, Ilona: Fäden des Lebens am Nil, Bildteppiche aus Kairo. Ramses Wissa Wassef Art Center / Threads of Egyptian Life, Tapestries from Cairo. The Ramses Wissa Wassef Art Center. Ägyptisches Museum und Papyrussammlung, Staatliche Museen zu Berlin, Berlin 2025, ISBN 9783886099016.
