= Asgar =

Asgar (Persian: عسگر; Azerbaijani: Əsgər) may refer to:

- Ali Asgar (disambiguation)
- Asgar (stylist) (born 1955), celebrity British hair stylist
- Asgar Abdullayev (footballer) (born 1960), Azerbaijani retired footballer
- Kami Asgar, Iranian-American supervising sound editor
- Asgar Ali Karbalai, an Indian political and social leader from Kargil District
- Asgar Khanlu (disambiguation)
- Emamzadeh Asgar
- Khajeh Asgar
- Asgar Abade Kooh
- Asgar Khani
- Asgar, Bam
- Asgar, Rabor
- Deh-e Asgar (disambiguation)
- Qal'eh-ye Asgar (disambiguation)
- Boneh-ye Amir Asgar
- Chahardahi-ye Asgar
- Asgarabad (disambiguation)

== See also ==
- Askar (disambiguation)
- Asgari (disambiguation)
- Ali al-Asghar ibn Husayn
