= Askar =

Askar (Arabic: عسكر, lit. 'army'; Somali: Caskar, lit. 'policeman'), al-Askar, or Ashkar may refer to:

== Places ==
- Askar (camp), a Palestinian refugee camp near Nablus
- Al-Askar, the capital of Egypt in 750–868 AD
- Askar, Bahrain, a village
- Askar, Bangladesh, a village
- Aşkar, a village in Azerbaijan
- Askar, Iran, a village in Kerman Province
- Askar, a fictional ancient mythical civilisation in Robin Jarvis' Wyrd Museum Trilogy

== People ==
- Abdimalik Askar (born 1975/1976), a Somali-American educator and politician
- Amin Askar (born 1985), an Ethiopian footballer
- Attila Aşkar (born 1944), a Turkish civil engineer
- Aziz Ben Askar (born 1976), a Moroccan footballer
- Mohamed Askar (born 1986), a Sri Lankan cricketer
- Osama Askar (born 1957), an Egyptian Army officer
- Ashkar Saudan, Indian actor in Malayalam cinema

== Other uses ==
- Askar Capital, an investment bank in Iceland 2007–2010

== See also ==
- Askari (disambiguation)
- Asgar (disambiguation)
- Askariyeh (disambiguation)
- Asgariyeh, a village in Mashhad County, Razavi Khorasan, Iran
