= Askari (disambiguation) =

An askari was a local soldier serving in the armies of the European colonial powers in Africa.

Askari (Arabic: عسكري, 'soldier' or 'military') may also refer to:

== People ==
- Hasan al-Askari (c. 846 – 874), an Imam of Twelver Shia Islam
- Agha Hasan Askari (died 2023), Pakistani film director
- Abu Hilal al-Askari (died 1005), an Islamic scholar
- Askari Mirza, or simply Askari (1516 – 1557/1558), a son of Babur Mirza, founder of the Mughal dynasty
- Ali Askari (1936–1978), Kurdish politician
- Askari Mian Irani (1940–2004), a Pakistani painter
- Askari Mohammadian (born 1963), an Iranian wrestler
- Bahman Askari (born 1991), an Iranian karateka
- Hasan Askari (writer) (1919-1978), Pakistani scholar and linguist
- Hasan Askari Rizvi, Pakistani political scientist and military analyst
- Hossein Askari (born 1975), Iranian racing cyclist
- Hossein Askari (economist), Iranian economist
- Jafar al-Askari (1885–1936), Iraqi prime minister
- Khwaja Hassan Askari (1921–1984), the last Nawab of Dacca
- Majid Askari (born 1991), an Iranian weightlifter
- Malika Askari, Indian actress
- Mumtaz Askari or Mumtaz, Indian actress
- Murtada Sharif 'Askari (1914–2007), known as Allamah 'Askari, a Shiite scholar
- Rashid Askari (born 1965), Bengali-English writer and academic
- Rouhollah Askari (born 1982), Iranian hurdler
- Sami al-Askari, Iraqi politician
- Sana Askari, Pakistani model and actress
- Süleyman Askerî (1884–1915), Ottoman Army military officer
- Syed Hasan Askari (1901–1990), Indian historian
- Yousef Al-Askari (born 1994), a Kuwaiti swimmer
- Zainab Al Askari (born 1974), Bahraini actress
- Askari X, Ricky Murdock, an American hip-hop artist
- Wazir Khan (Sirhind), (died 1710, real name Mirza Askari), a governor of Sirhind

=== Fictional characters ===
- Scar (The Lion King), whose real name is "Askari" according to Ford Riley

== Places ==
- Askari, Iran (disambiguation), a number of places in Iran
- Askari Amusement Park, Karachi, Pakistan
- Askari Monument, Dar es Salaam, Tanzania
- Al-Askari Shrine, or Al-Askari Mosque, Samarra, Iraq
  - Al-Askari mosque bombing (disambiguation)

== Ships ==
- Italian destroyer Ascari, an Italian destroyer completed in 1939 and sunk in 1943
- USS Askari (ARL-30), a World War II United States Navy landing craft repair ship

== Other uses ==
- Askari Aviation, a Pakistani airline
- Askari Bank, a Pakistan commercial and retail bank
- Askari Group of Companies, or Army Welfare Trust, a Pakistani Army conglomerate company
- Operation Askari, a 1983 military operation in Angola

== See also ==
- Italian destroyer Ascaro
- Asgari (disambiguation)
- Askar (disambiguation)
- Askariyeh (disambiguation)
- Ascari Cars, a British automobile manufacturer
