= Askariyeh =

Askariyeh (Persian: عسكريه) may refer to:

- Askariyeh, Razavi Khorasan
- Askariyeh, Yazd
- Askariyeh, Taft, Yazd Province

== See also ==
- Asgariyeh
- Askari (disambiguation)
- Askar (disambiguation)
