= Al-Tawba Mosque =

Mosque in Damanhur, Egypt

- مسجد التوبة
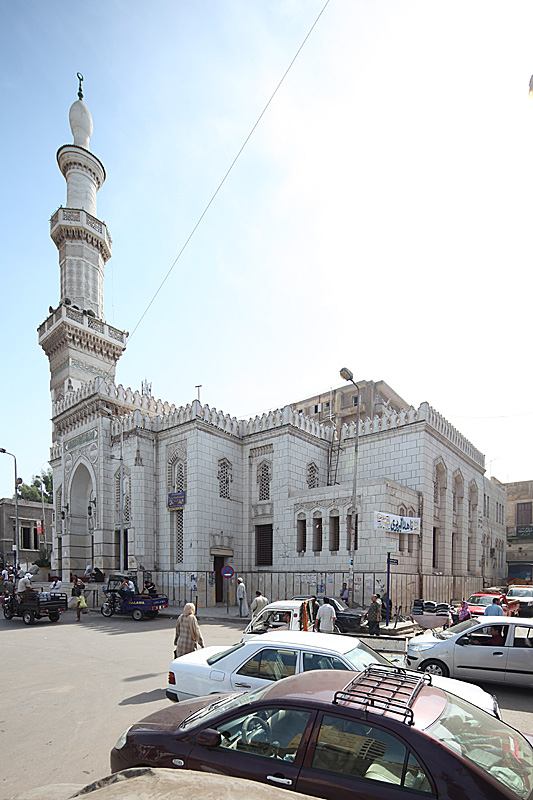

- Location of the mosque in the Nile Delta

Religion
- Affiliation: Islam
- Ecclesiastical or organisational status: Mosque
- Status: Active

Location
- Location: Damanhur, Beheira Governorate
- Country: Egypt
- Interactive map of Al-Tawba Mosque
- Coordinates: 31°2′10″N 30°28′8″E

Architecture
- Type: Mosque
- Style: Mamluk
- Completed: 642
- Minaret: 1

Al-Tawba Mosque (Arabic: مسجد التوبة, romanized: Masjid al-Tawbah) is a 7th century mosque in Damanhour, Egypt. It is considered to be one of the oldest mosques in all of Africa.

== History ==
Built in 642 AD by Muslim commander Amr ibn al-As during the Islamic conquest of Egypt, the mosque is considered to be one of the first mosques built in Egypt due to its completion right after the Amr ibn al-As mosque in Old Cairo was built. The mosque has seen several restorations during its history, most notably in 2021, when 2 million Egyptian pounds were spent to restore the mosque.

== Architecture ==
The mosque is decorated by several rare columns made of marble, as well as a pure copper chandelier that weighs three tons. An antique wooden pulpit that is decorated with carved motifs lies in the mosque, a gift from the first governor of Beheira, Wajih Abaza. The wooden pulpit bears the emblem of the now-defunct United Arab Republic. The minaret of the mosque, designed in the Mamluk style, consists of three levels, and reaches a height of over 60 meters tall., Numerous quranic verses and ornamental motifs are displayed on the minaret, as well as in the inside of the mosque itself, which can accommodate up to 2,000 worshippers.
