= Asgari =

Asgari may refer to:

== People ==
- Asgari Bai, Indian singer
- Ajda Asgari (born 1989), Swedish politician
- Ali-Reza Asgari, Iranian general
- Jahangir Asgari, Iranian footballer
- Mahmoud Asgari and Ayaz Marhoni, Executed Iranians
- Sirous Asgari, Iranian materials scientist

== Places ==
- Askari, Iran (disambiguation)

== See also ==
- Asgar (disambiguation)
- Askari (disambiguation)
