= Ali Asgar, Iran =

Ali Asgar (Persian: علي عسگر) may refer to:

- Ali Asgar, Chaharmahal and Bakhtiari
- Ali Asgar, Lorestan
