= Ascaro =

Ascaro may refer to:

- Ascaro, the Italian-language singular form of "askari," a local soldier serving in the armies of the European colonial powers in Africa
- Italian destroyer Ascaro, an Italian destroyer commissioned in 1913 and stricken in 1930

== See also ==
- Askari (disambiguation)
