= Shahid Saduqi =

Shahid Saduqi (Persian: شَهيد صدوقي) may refer to:

- Shahid Saduqi, Ilam
- Shahid Saduqi, Kermanshah
