= Old Cairo =

Neighbourhood within historic Cairo, Egypt

Coordinates: 30°01′N 31°14′E

UNESCO World Heritage Site
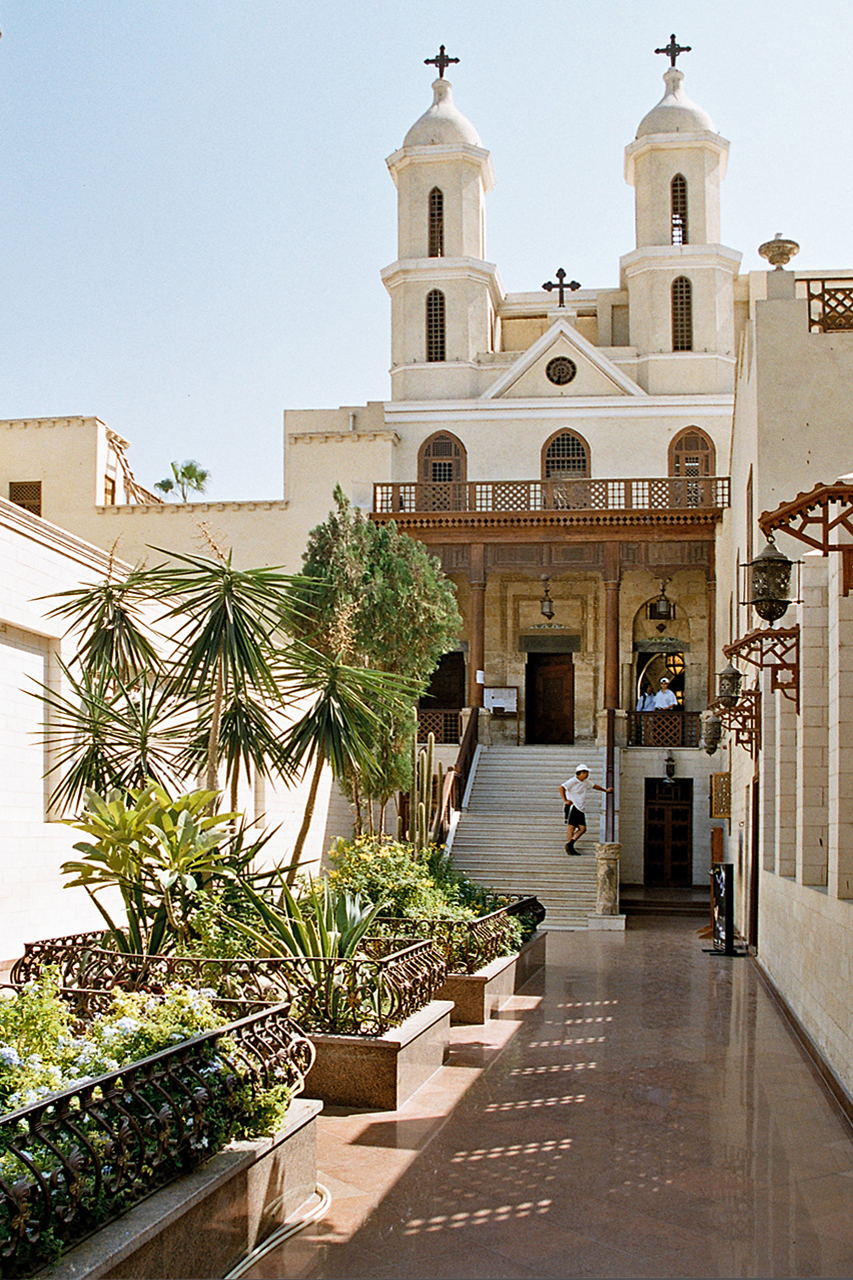
- Old Cairo, view of the Hanging Church
- Interactive map of Old Cairo
- Part of: Historic Cairo
- Criteria: Cultural: i, ii, iv, v
- Reference: 89
- Inscription: 1979 (3rd Session)
- Area: 52,366 ha (129,400 acres)

Old Cairo (Arabic: مصر القديمة, romanized: Miṣr al-Qadīma, Egyptian pronunciation: Maṣr El-ʾAdīma; Coptic: ⲃⲁⲃⲩⲗⲱⲛ ⲛ̀ⲭⲏⲙⲓ) is a historic area in Cairo, Egypt, which includes the site of a Roman-era fortress, the Christian settlement of Coptic Cairo, and the Muslim-era settlement of Fustat that pre-dates the founding of Cairo proper in 969 AD. It is part of what is referred to as Historic Cairo, a UNESCO World Heritage Site.

Miṣr al-Qadīma is also a modern administrative district in the Southern Area of Cairo, encompassing the area from the Cairo Aqueduct to the north, to the Ring Road in the south, and from the Khalifa cemetery to the east, to the Nile Corniche in the west, as well as Roda Island, or Manial al-Roda. It had 250,313 residents according to the 2017 census.

== History ==
=== Roman fort and Coptic Cairo ===
The area around present-day Cairo had long been a focal point of Ancient Egypt due to its strategic location at the junction of the Nile Valley and the Nile Delta regions, which also placed it at the crossing of major routes between North Africa and the Levant. Memphis, the capital of Egypt during the Old Kingdom and a major city up until the Ptolemaic period, was located a short distance south west of present-day Cairo.

Around the turn of the 4th century, as Memphis was declining in importance, the Romans established a large fortress along the east bank of the Nile. The fortress, called Babylon, (Note: Unrelated to ancient Babylon in Mesopotomia.) was built by the Roman emperor Diocletian (r. 285–305) at the entrance of a canal connecting the Nile to the Red Sea that was created earlier by emperor Trajan (r. 98–115). (Note: The historical chronicler John of Nikiou attributed the construction of the fortress to Trajan, but more recent excavations date the fortress to the time of Diocletian. A succession of canals connecting the Nile Valley with the Red Sea were also previously dug around this region in different periods prior to Trajan. Trajan's canal fell out of use some time between the reign of Diocletian and the 7th century.) While no structures older than the 7th century have been preserved in the area aside from the Roman fortifications, historical evidence suggests that a sizeable city existed. The city was important enough that its bishop, Cyrus, participated in the Second Council of Ephesus in 449.

The Byzantine-Sassanian War between 602 and 628 caused great hardship and likely caused much of the urban population to leave for the countryside, leaving the settlement partly deserted. The site nonetheless remained at the heart of the Coptic Orthodox community, composed of Egyptian Christians who separated from the Roman and Byzantine churches in the late 4th century.

=== Fustat in the early Muslim period ===
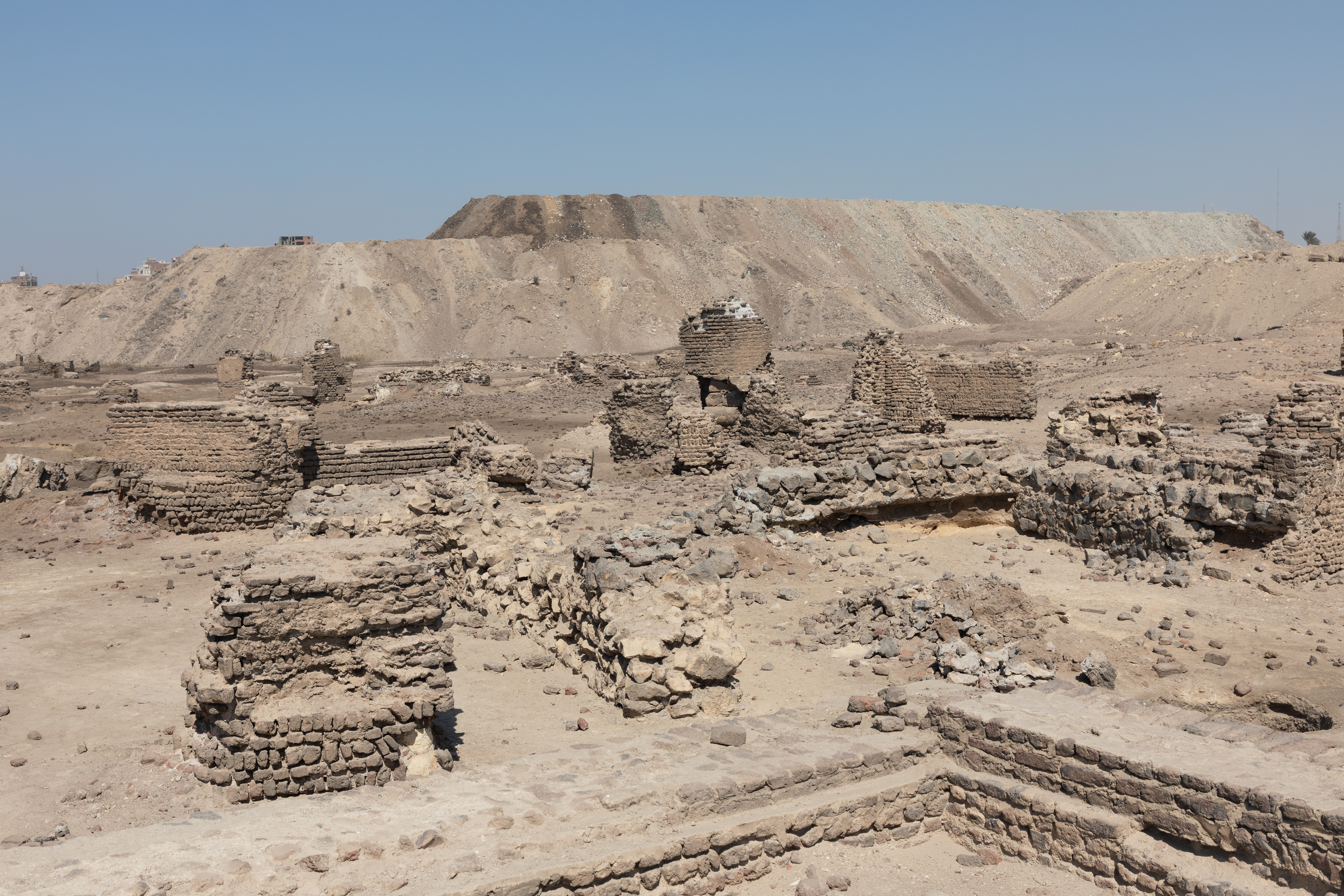
Excavated ruins of Fustat (2017 photo)

After the Muslim conquest of Egypt in 641 during the period of the Rashidun Caliphate, the Arab commander Amr ibn al-As established Fustat (Arabic: الفُسطاط, romanized: al-Fusṭāṭ) just north of the Roman fortress, on the eastern side of the Nile. At Caliph Umar's request, the Egyptian capital was moved from Alexandria to this new city.

=== Foundation of Al-Askar (Abbasid period) ===
The reach of the subsequent Umayyads Caliphs was extensive, stretching from modern-day Spain all the way to western China. However, they were overthrown by the Abbasids, who moved the capital of the Islamic empire to Baghdad. In Egypt, this shift in power involved moving control from the city of Fustat slightly north to a new Abbasid city called al-'Askar (Arabic: مدينة العسكري, romanized: Madinatu l-‘Askari, lit. 'City of Cantonments or City of Sections'). Intended primarily as a city large enough to house an army, it was laid out in a grid pattern that could be easily subdivided into separate sections for various groups, such as merchants and officers.

=== Foundation of Al-Qata'i (Tulunid period) ===
Local Egyptian governors gained increasing autonomy, and in 870, governor Ahmad ibn Tulun made Egypt into a de facto independent state, though still nominally under the rule of the Abbasid Caliph. As a symbol of this independence, in 868 ibn Tulun founded yet another capital, al-Qata'i, slightly further north of al-'Askar. The capital remained there until 905, when the city was destroyed.

=== Later history of Fustat ===
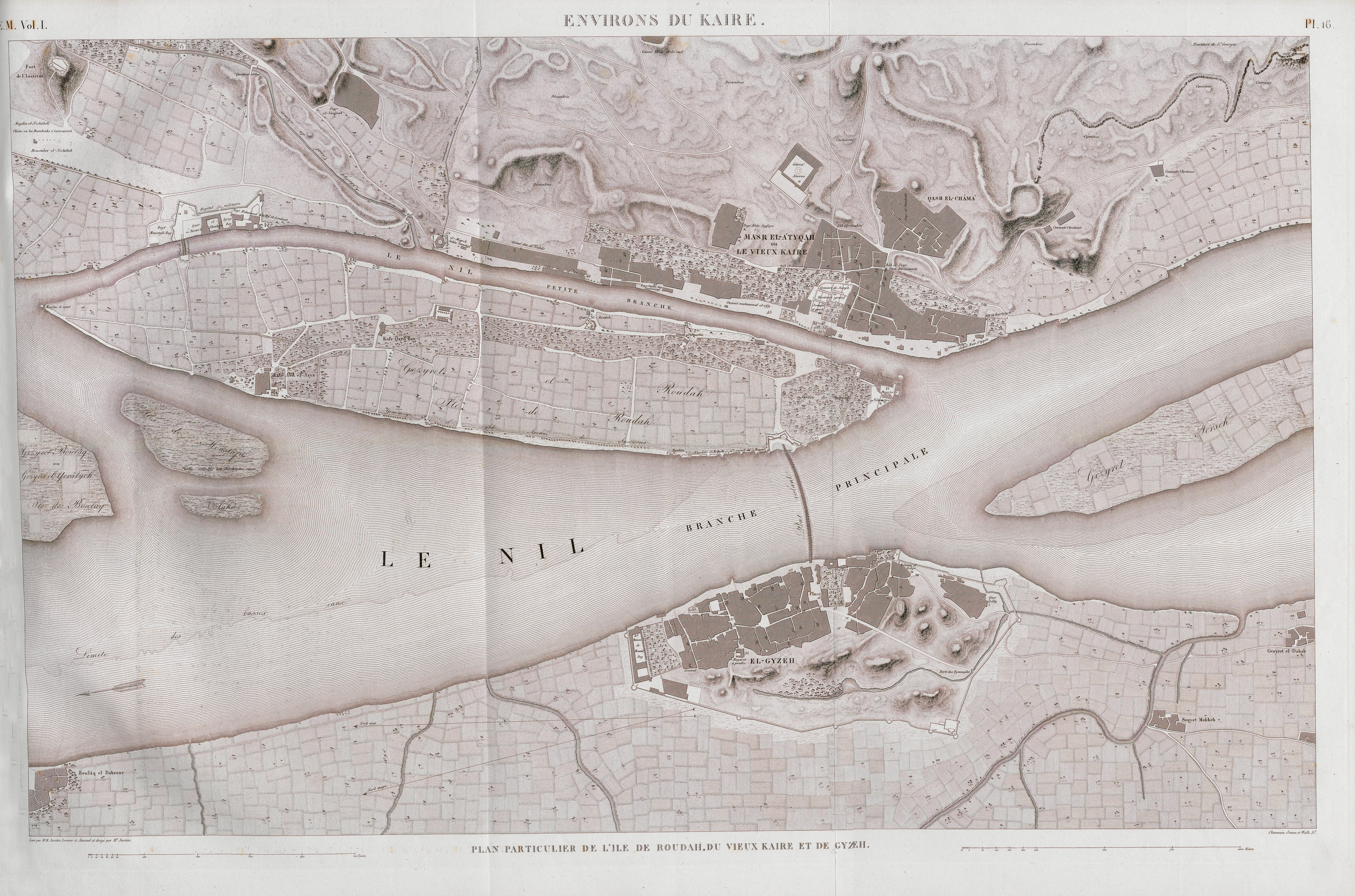
Detailed map of Old Cairo, circa 1800, opposite Roda Island and Giza

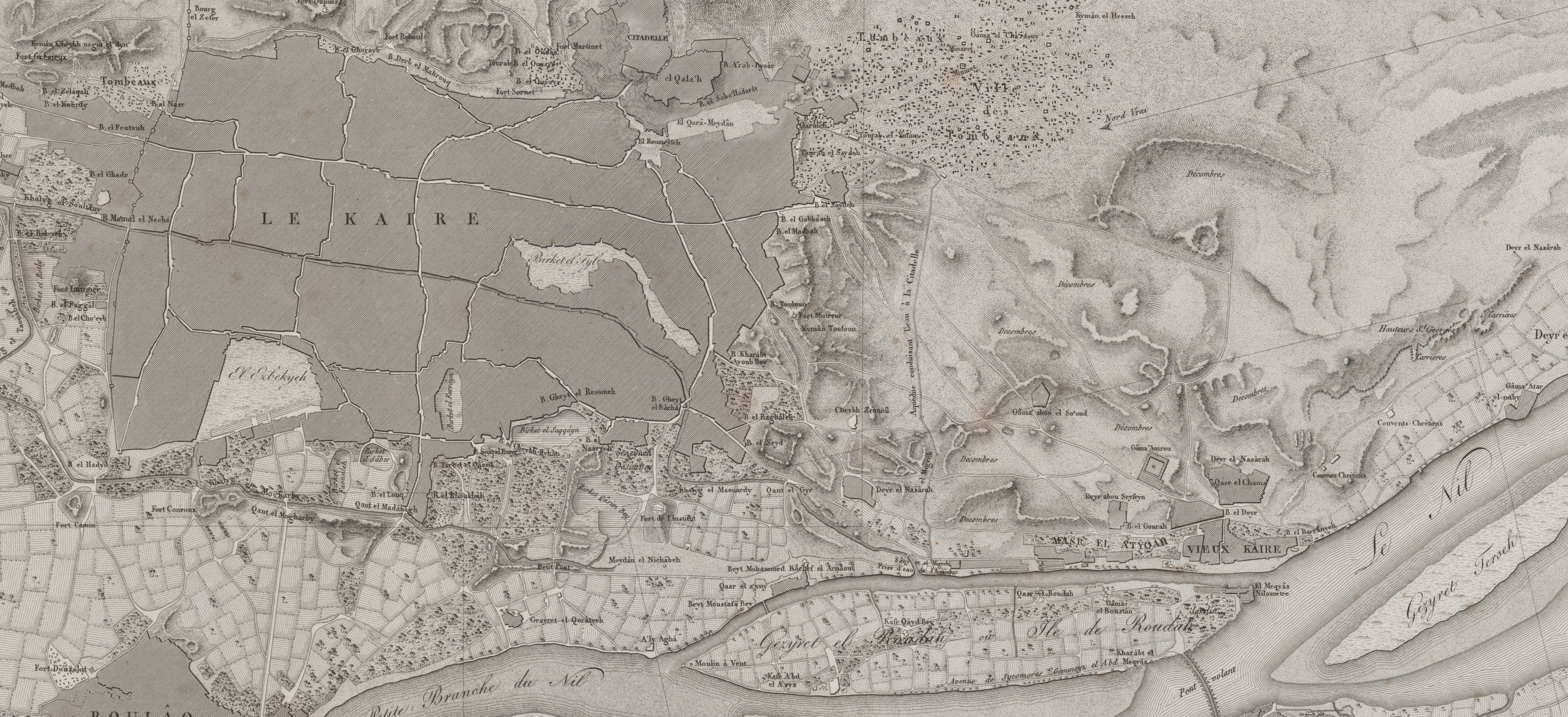
Map showing Medieval Cairo (Le Kaire, left) and Old Cairo (Vieux Kaire, right), circa 1800

After the destruction of al-Qata'i, the administrative capital of Egypt returned to Fustat. In the 10th century, under the Fatimids, the capital moved to nearby al-Qāhirah (Cairo), founded in 969. Cairo's boundaries grew to eventually encompass the three earlier capitals of al-Fusṭāṭ, al-Qata'i and al-‘Askar. Fustat itself was then partly destroyed by a vizier-ordered fire that burned from 1168 to 1169, as a defensive measure against the attacking Crusader Kingdom of Jerusalem.

By the end of the 15th century, the newer port of Bulaq was able to take over the role as the major commercial port from Old Cairo.

== Modern district and population ==
Masr al-Qadima (Old Cairo) is a Cairo district in the Southern Area made up of one qism (police ward).

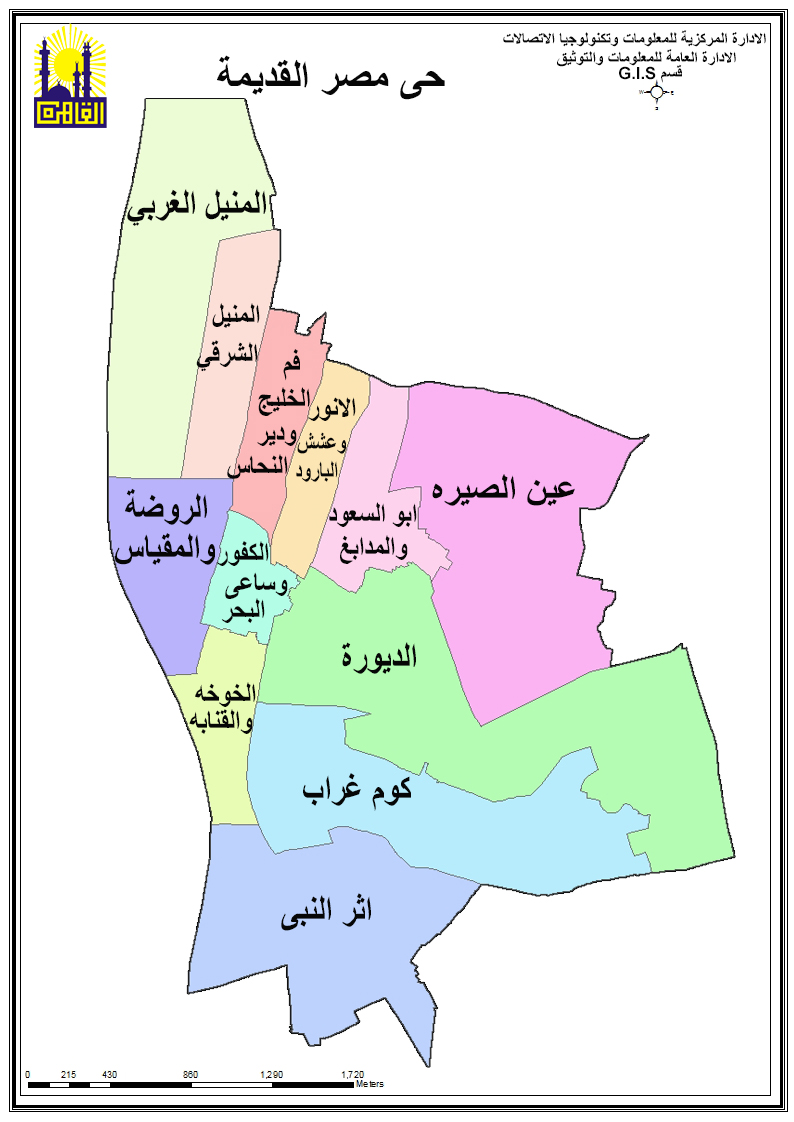
Masr al-Qadima district map showing its shiakhas.

The district had 250,313 residents in 2017 spread over 12 shiakhas as follows:

Shiakha	Code 2017	Population
`Ayn al-Ṣîra	010910	30593
Abû al-Sa`ûd and al-Madâbigh	010901	21636
Anwar and `Ishash al-Bârûd, al-	010903	11731
Athar al-Nabî	010902	27941
Duyûra, al-	010905	27950
Fumm al-Khalîj and Dayr al-Nuḥâs	010911	6671
Khawkha and al-Qanâya	010904	8299
Kufûr et Sâ`î al-Baḥr, al-	010907	8593
Kûm Ghurâb	010912	60553
Manyal al-gharbî, al-	010909	15297
Manyal al-sharqî, al-	010908	19669
Rawḍa et al-Miqyâs, al-	010906	

== Historical sites and attractions ==
=== Coptic Cairo and the Babylon Fortress ===
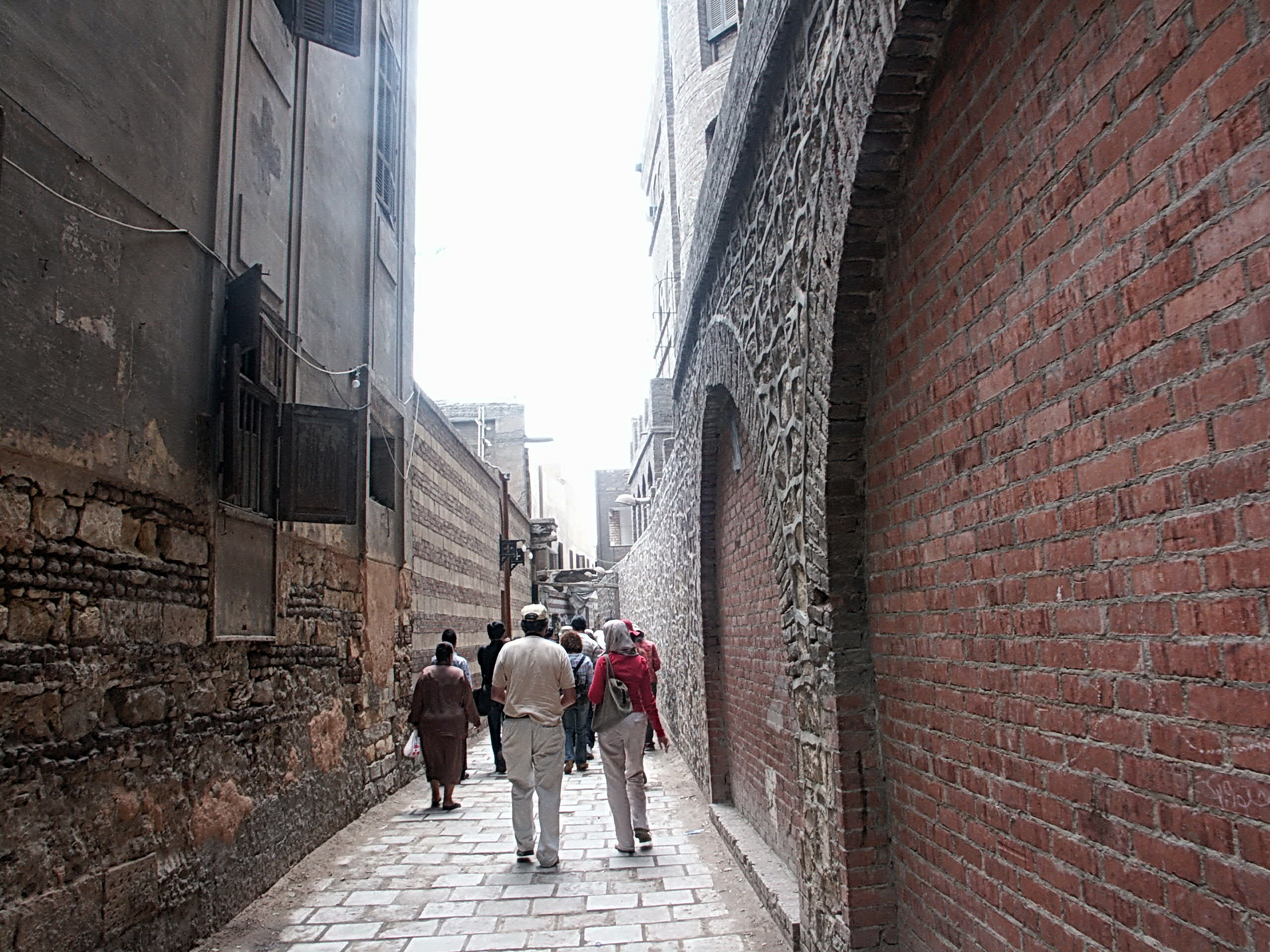
The narrow streets of Coptic Cairo, inside the former Babylon Fortress

The area includes Coptic Cairo, a walled enclave on the site of the partly-preserved Babylon Fortress. Parts of the ancient fortress's walls, towers, and its gate are still visible. The enclave holds a high concentration of historic Christian churches such as the Hanging Church, the Greek Orthodox Church of St. George, the Church of Saints Sergius and Bacchus, the Church of Santa Barbara, and other Christian buildings. From the 11th century to the 13th century, the Hanging Church (also known as the Church of the Virgin) and the Church of Saint Mercurius (located a short distance north of the enclave), served as the seats of the Coptic Patriarchate and the residences of the Coptic Pope. The Church of Saint Barbara and the Church of Saints Sergius and Bacchus are also notable for being among Cairo's oldest preserved churches, dating from the late 7th or early 8th century.

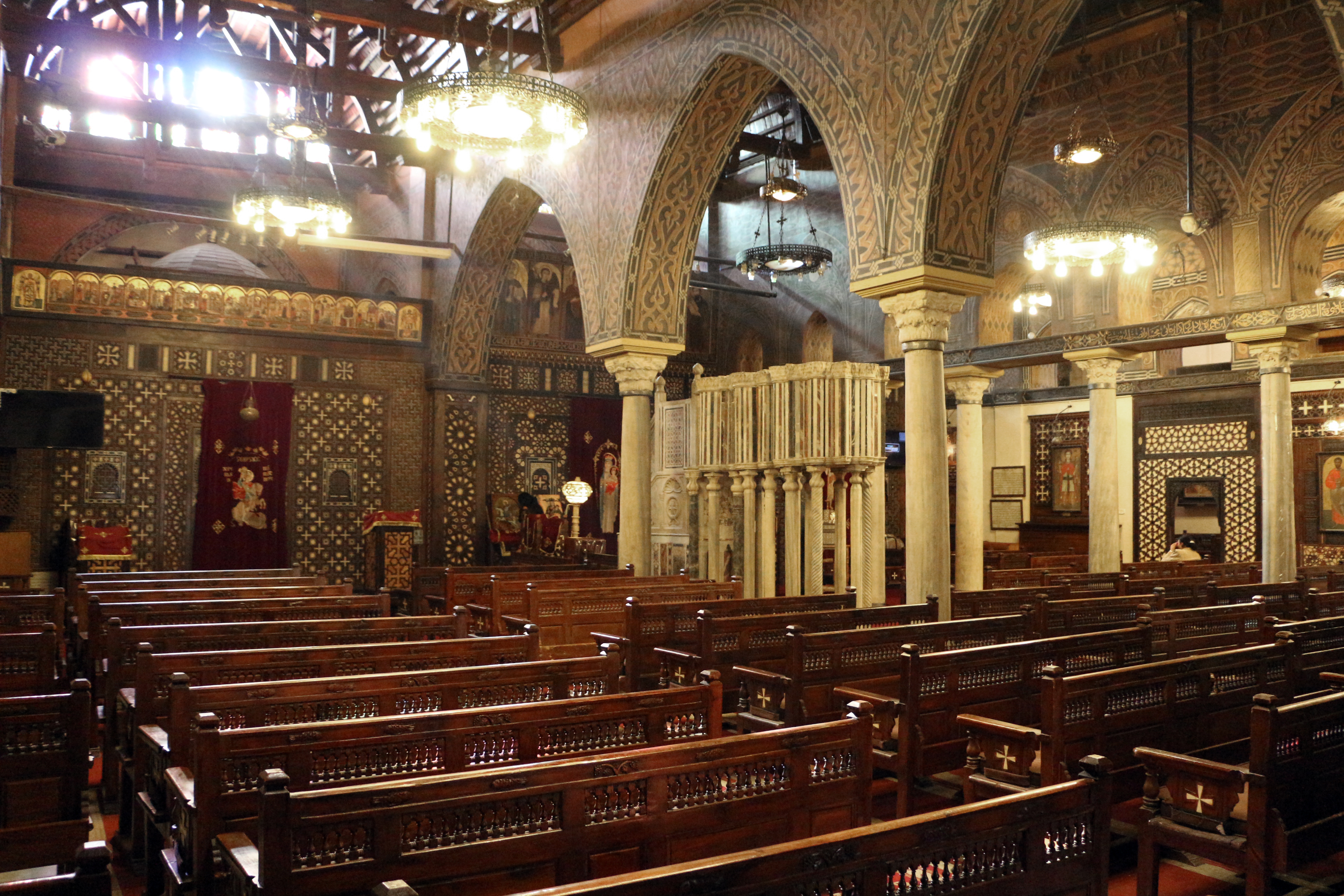
Interior of the Hanging Church in Coptic Cairo

The area also contains the Coptic Museum, which showcases the history of Coptic art from Greco-Roman to Islamic times, and the Ben Ezra Synagogue, the oldest and best-known synagogue in Cairo, where the important collection of historic documents known as the Cairo Geniza were discovered in the 19th century.

Count Gabriel Habib Sakakini Pasha (1841–1923), who had become a household name in his time, (Note: He also built a notable palace in the El-Sakakini area in 1897.) established the Roman Catholic Cemetery in Old Cairo.

=== Historical sites near the fortress ===
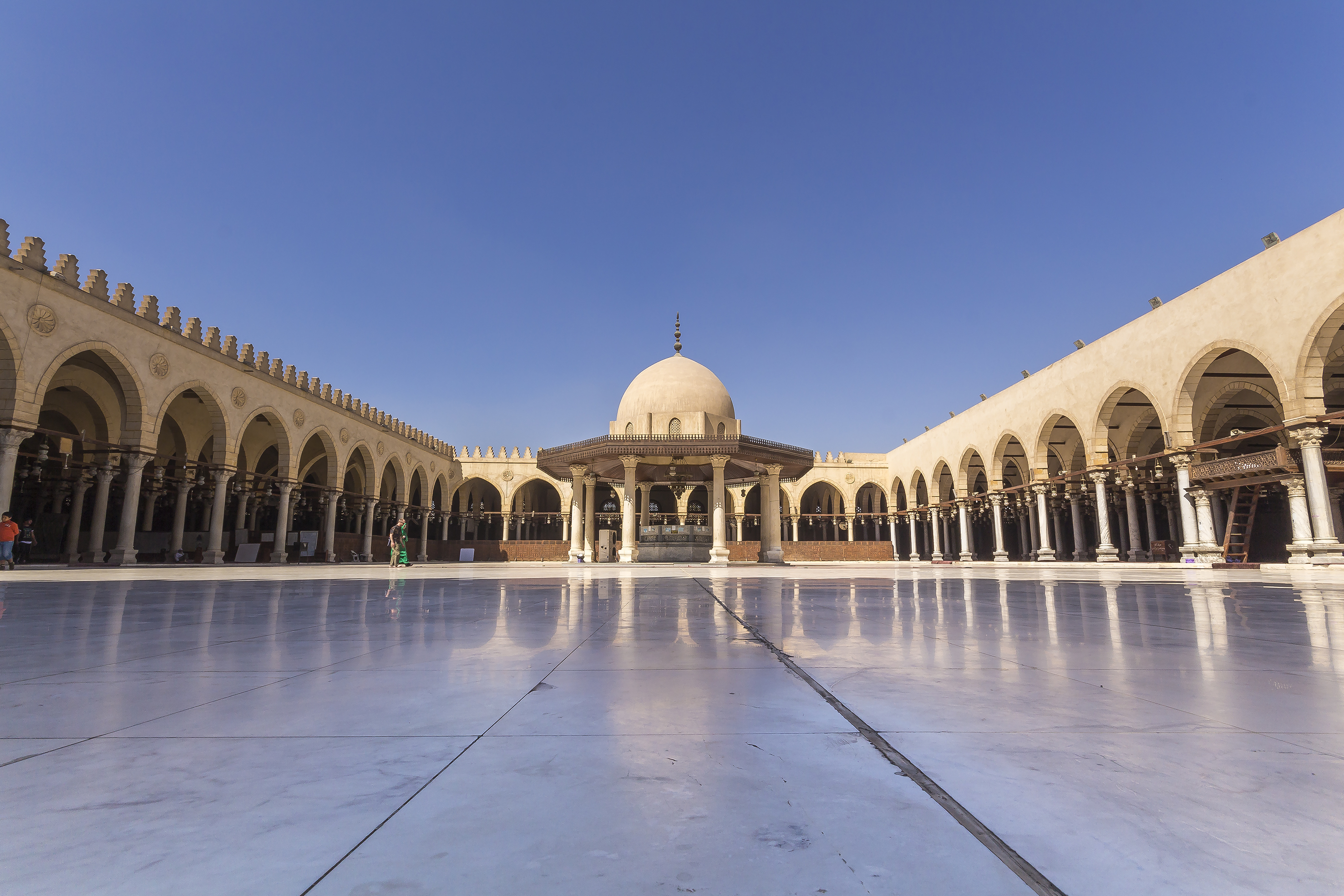
Courtyard of the Amr ibn al-As Mosque

To the north of the Babylon Fortress is the Amr ibn al-'As Mosque, the first mosque in Egypt and the most important religious centre of what was formerly Fustat, but rebuilt many times since. A part of the former city of Fustat has also been excavated to the east of the mosque and of the Coptic enclave.

Nearby and to the northwest of Babylon Fortress and the mosque is the Monastery of Saint Mercurius (or Dayr Abu Sayfayn), an important and historic Coptic religious complex consisting of the Church of Saint Mercurius (mentioned above), the Church of Saint Shenute, and the Church of the Virgin (also known as al-Damshiriya). Several other historic churches are also situated to the south of Babylon Fortress.

=== Other nearby attractions ===
Further north is the Cairo Citadel Aqueduct, built during the Ayyubid and Mamluk periods (from the 12th to 16th centuries) to supply water to the Cairo Citadel to the east. Long sections of the elevated aqueduct, as well as its intake tower near the river, are still standing today.

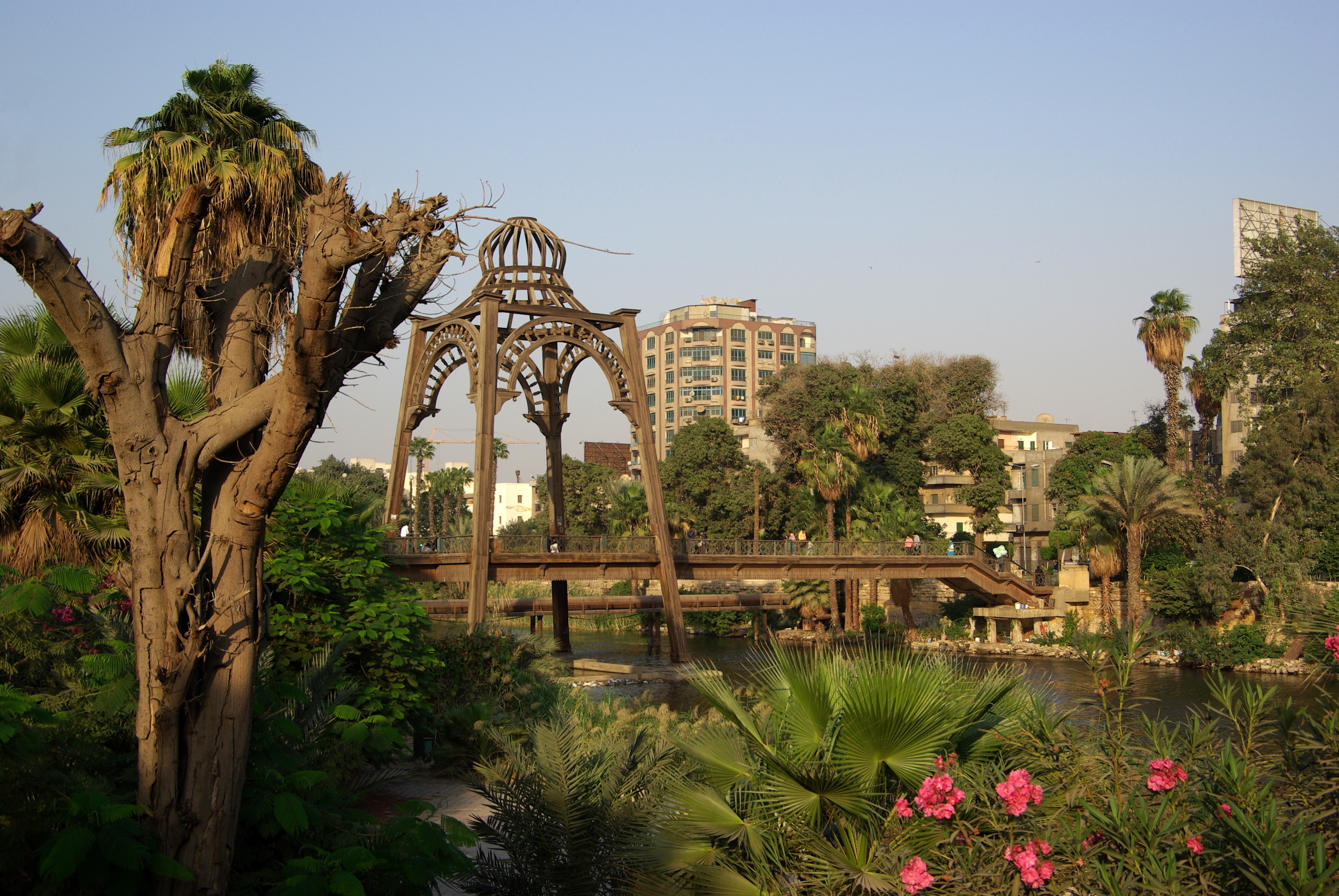
River and footbridge between Roda Island and Old Cairo

Located on the Nile River close to Coptic Cairo is Roda Island, which is connected by a nearby footbridge. Several historic monuments are located in the island, including the Nilometer, built in 861 on the orders of the Abbasid caliph al-Mutawakkil. Although it was repaired and given a new roof in later centuries, its basic structure is still preserved, making it the oldest preserved Islamic-era structure in Cairo today.

In 2021, the National Museum of Egyptian Civilization was opened to visitors in a new building in Old Cairo, near ancient Fustat. The museum provides an overview of Egyptian history with artefacts drawn from the existing collections of other museums around the country. The 22 ancient royal mummies formerly housed in the Egyptian Museum at Tahrir Square were moved here in 2021.

== Conservation and restoration ==
The effort to conserve Egypt's monuments has existed since the 19th century. In 1881, Khedive Tawfiq founded the Comité de Conservation des Monuments de l'Art Arabe.

In 1979, UNESCO designated Old Cairo, as part of wider Historic Cairo, as a World Heritage Site, calling it "one of the world's oldest Islamic cities, with its famous mosques, madrasas, hammams and fountains" and "the new centre of the Islamic world, reaching its golden age in the 14th century."

The archeological site of Fustat, which include excavations to the east of the main historical enclave, has been threatened by encroaching construction and modern development.
