= Deh-e Asgar =

Deh-e Asgar or Deh Asgar (Persian: ده عسگر) may refer to:

- Deh-e Asgar, Markazi
- Deh-e Asgar, Yazd
