= Ali Asgar =

Ali Asgar may refer to:

- Ali al-Asghar ibn Husayn ("Younger ‘Ali"), the youngest child of Al-Husayn, grandson of the Islamic Prophet Muhammad
- Ali Asgar, Iran (disambiguation), villages in Iran
- Ali Asgar (actor), Indian actor
