= Amr ibn al-As Mosque =

Mosque in Cairo, Egypt

- مَسْجِد عَمْرِو بْنِ الْعَاصِ
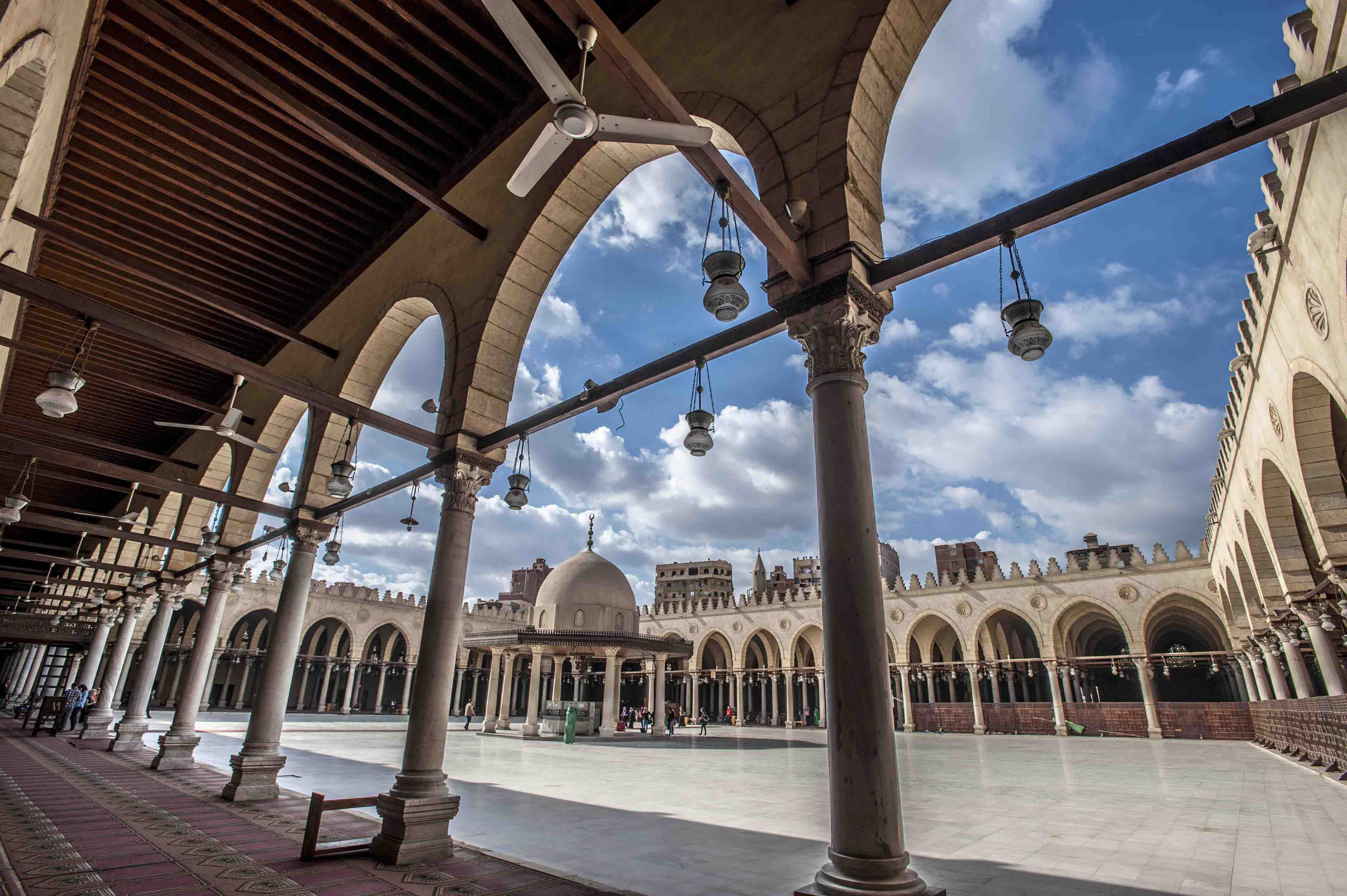

Religion
- Affiliation: Sunni Islam
- Ecclesiastical or organisational status: Mosque
- Status: Active

Location
- Location: Fustat, Old Cairo, Cairo
- Country: Egypt
- Interactive map of Amr ibn al-As Mosque
- Coordinates: 30°0′36″N 31°13′59″E

Architecture
- Type: Mosque
- Founder: Amr ibn al-As
- Completed: c. 642 CE (original); 1796 CE (rebuild); 1875 CE (rebuild); 1960s CE (current)

Specifications
- Length: 120 m (390 ft)
- Width: 112 m (367 ft)
- Dome: 1 (maybe more)
- Minaret: 4 (formerly 5)

UNESCO World Heritage Site
- Criteria: Cultural: (i)(v)(vi)
- Designated: 1979 (3rd session)
- Part of: Historic Cairo
- Reference no.: 89-002

The Amr ibn al-As Mosque (Arabic: مَسْجِد عَمْرِو بْنِ الْعَاصِ, romanized: Masjid ʿAmr ibn al-ʿĀṣ) is a mosque, located in the Fustat neighbourhood of Old Cairo, Egypt. Named in honour of the Arab Muslim commander Amr ibn al-As, the mosque was built in c. 642 CE as the centre of the newly founded capital of Egypt, Fustat. The original structure was the first mosque built in Egypt and one of the first in Africa. For 600 years, the mosque was also an important centre of Islamic learning until it was replaced by al-Muizz's Al-Azhar Mosque in Islamic Cairo. Through the twentieth century, it was the fourth largest mosque in the Islamic world.

The mosque's location was the site of the former tent of Amr ibn al-As. One corner of the mosque contained a room related in some significant way to his son, Abd Allah ibn Amr ibn al-As. Due to extensive reconstruction over the centuries nothing of the original building remained, but the rebuilt mosque is a prominent landmark and can be seen in what today is known as Old Cairo. It is an active mosque with a devout congregation, and when prayers are not taking place, it is also open to visitors and tourists.

== Etymology ==
The mosque is named after its founder, Amr ibn al-As, who led the Arab conquest of Egypt. Historical sources record that the mosque was also known in Arabic as al-Jāmi' al-'Atīq (Arabic: الجَامِع العتيق, lit. 'Old Mosque') and Tāj al-Jawāmi' (Arabic: تاج الجوامِع, lit. 'Crown of Mosques'). (Note: The mosque is also variously known as the Taj al-Jawame Mosque, the Jame al-Ateeq, and the Masjid Ahl ar-Rayah.)

== History ==
According to tradition, the original location was chosen by a bird. Amr ibn al-As, by order of Caliph Umar, was the Arab general that conquered Egypt from the Romans. In 641 CE, before he and his army attacked their capital city of Alexandria (at the northwestern part of the Nile Delta), the commander had set up his tent on the eastern side of the Nile, at the southern part of the delta. As the story is told, shortly before he set off to battle, a dove laid an egg in the commander's tent. When he returned victorious, he needed to choose a site for a new capital city, since Umar had decreed that it could not be in far-away Alexandria. Therefore, the commander was inspired to declare the site of the dove's egg as the centre of a new capital city, Fustat, or Misr al-Fustat, "City of the Tents". The commander built a grand mosque at the site of his tent in the encampment.

=== Renovations and expansions ===
The mosque sahn in 1870. The arcaded colonnade still exists, while the central structure has undergone some changes over time. (Credit: Museo Egizio, Turin).

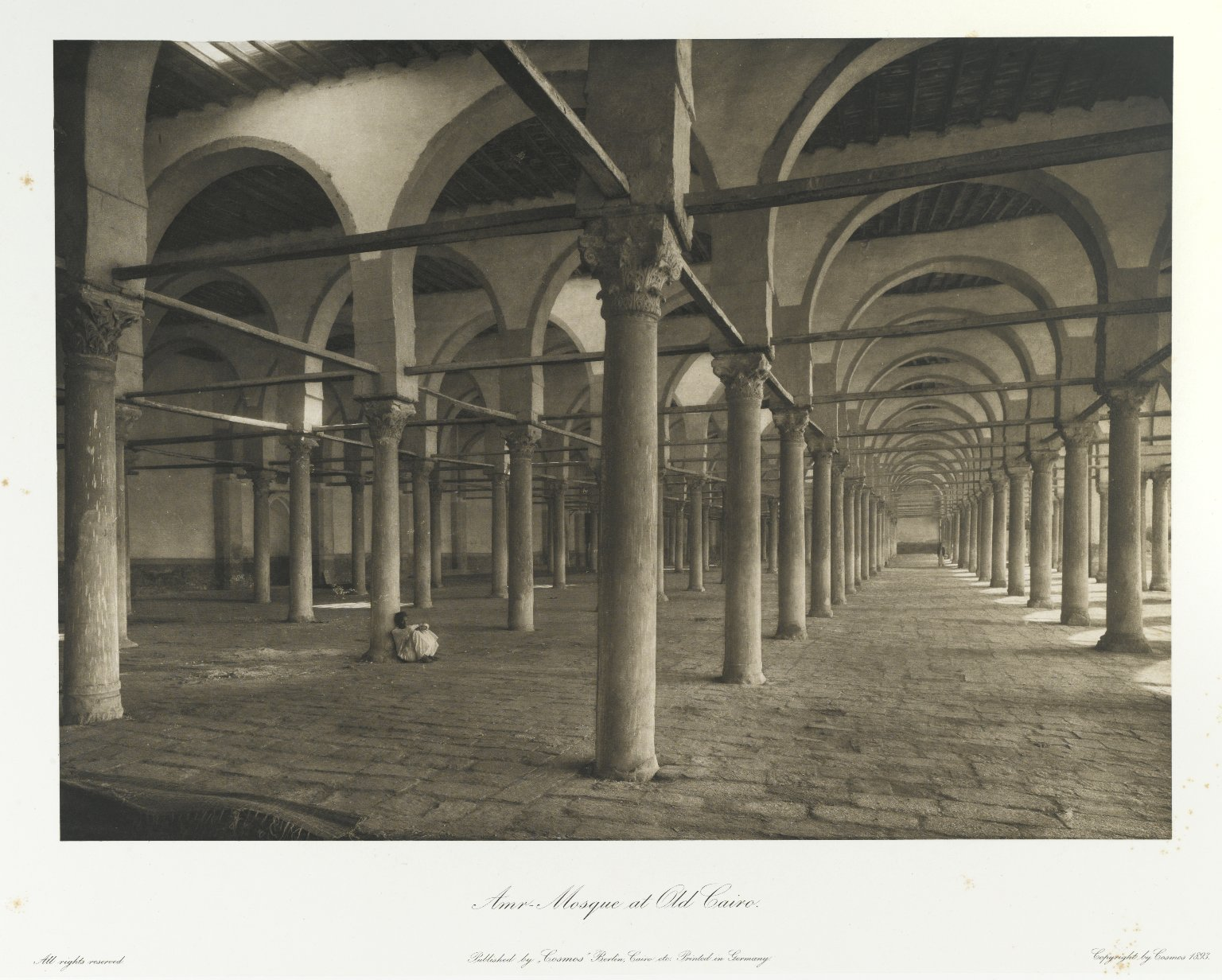
Interior of the mosque, in 1893

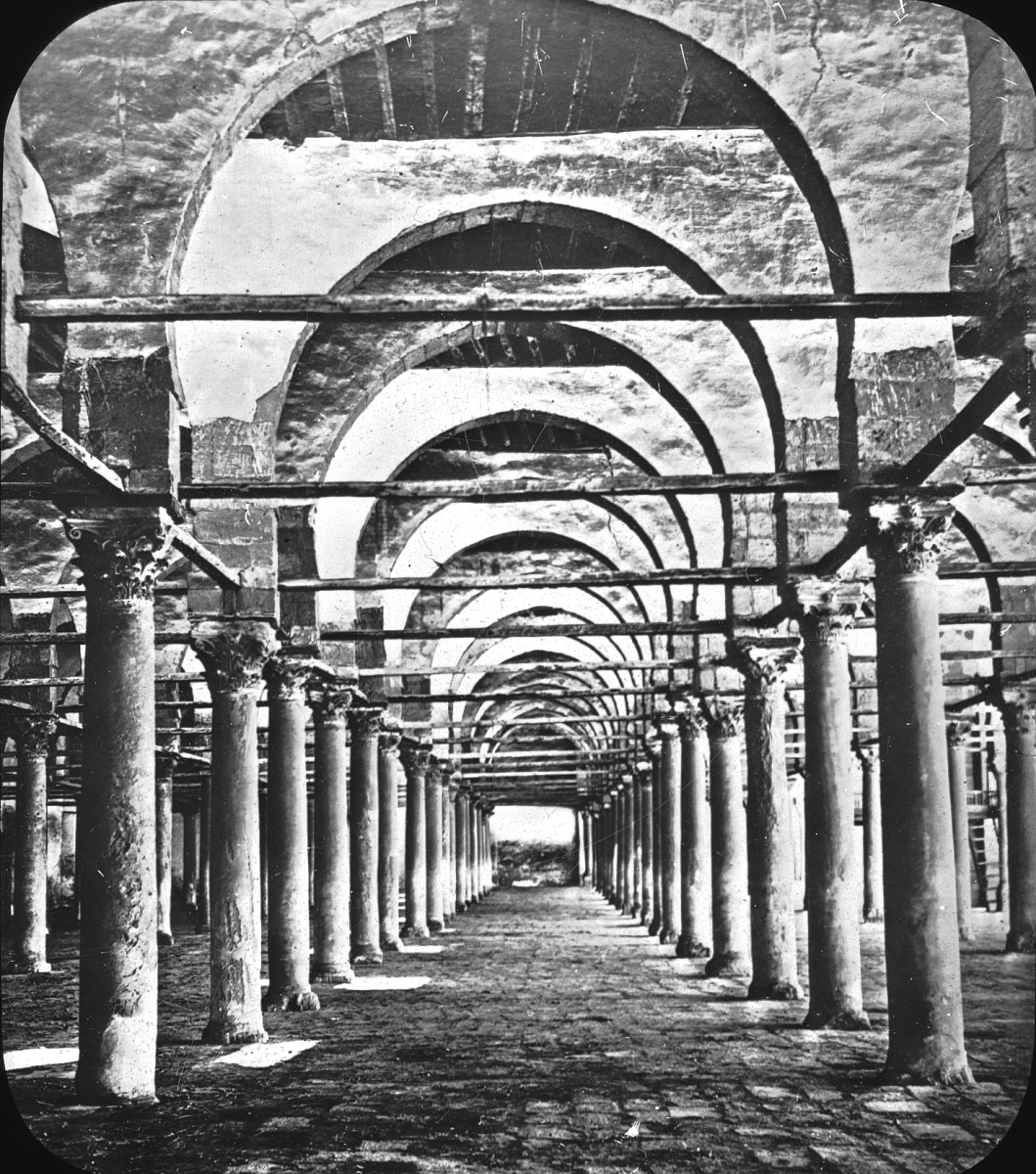
Interior of the mosque, prior to 1923

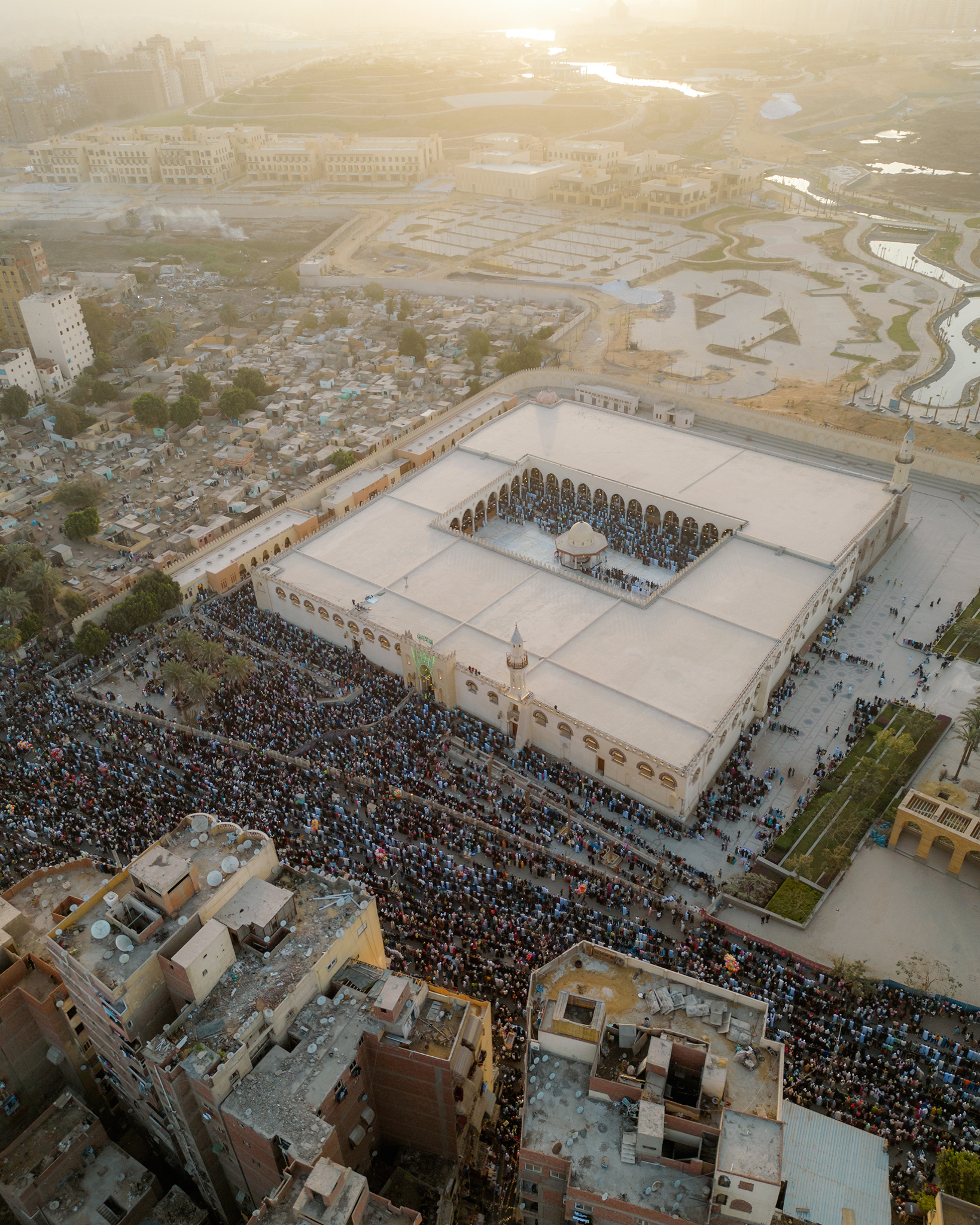
Eid prayer gatherings at the mosque, 2026

The complex was completely rebuilt in 673 CE by the governor Maslama ibn Mukhallad al-Ansari, who added four minarets, one at each of the mosque's corners, and doubled its area in size. The addition of these minarets allowed the call to prayer to be heard from every corner, and taken up by other nearby mosques. Governor Abd al-Aziz ibn Marwan added an extension to the mosque in 698 CE and once again doubled the mosque's area. In 711 a concave prayer niche was added to replace the flat one. In 827 CE, it had seven new aisles built, parallel to the wall of the qibla, the direction Muslims face during prayer. Each aisle had an arcade of columns, with the last column in each row attached to the wall by means of a wooden architrave carved with a frieze.

In 827 CE, governor Abd Allah ibn Tahir made more additions to the mosque. It was enlarged to its present size, and the southern wall of the present day mosque was built.

In the 9th century, the mosque was extended by the Abbasid Caliph al-Mamun, who added a new area on the southwest side, increasing the mosque's dimensions to 120 by 112 metres (394 by 367 ft). In 1169, the city of Fustat and the mosque were destroyed by a fire that was ordered by Egypt's own vizier Shawar, who had ordered its destruction to prevent the city from being captured by the Crusaders. After the Crusaders were expelled, and the area had been conquered by Nur al-Din's army, Saladin took power, and had the mosque rebuilt in 1179. During this time Saladin had a belvedere built below a minaret.

In the 14th century CE, Burhan al-Din Ibrahim al-Mahalli paid the costs of restoring the mosque. In 1303, Emir Salar restored the mosque after an earthquake. He also added a stucco prayer niche for the outer wall of the mosque, which is now gone.

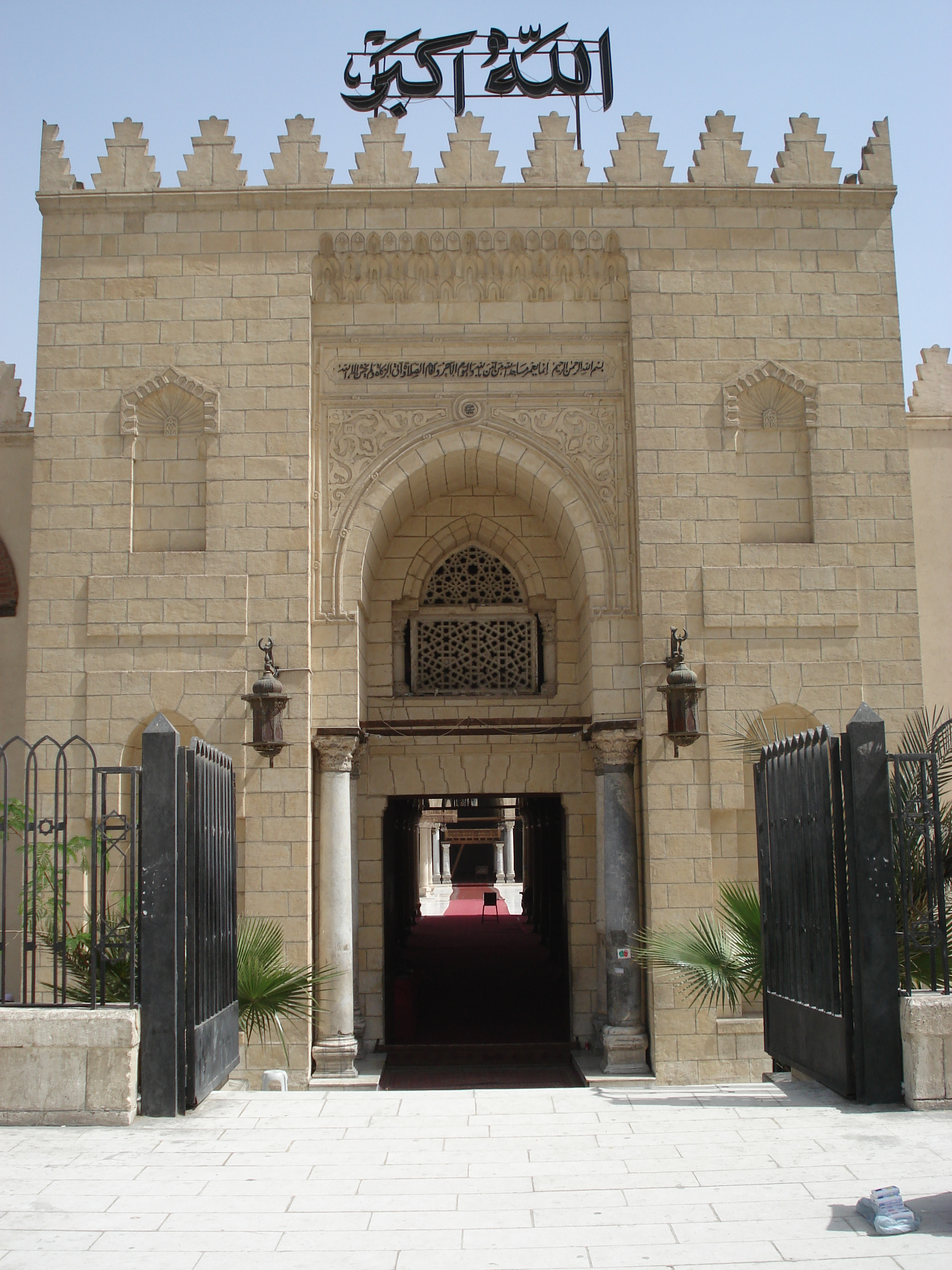
Mosque of Amr ibn al-As

In the 18th century CE, Mourad Bey, one of the Egyptian Mamluk leaders, destroyed the mosque because of dilapidation. In 1796, he then ordered the mosque to be rebuilt, before the arrival of Napoleon's French Expedition to Egypt. During Mourad's reconstruction, the builders decreased the number of rows of columns from seven to six, and changed the orientation of the aisles to make them perpendicular to the qibla wall. It was also probably at this time that the current remaining minarets were added. During the French occupation much of the interior wood decoration was taken for firewood by the French Army.

In 1875, the mosque was rebuilt again; and in the 20th century, during the reign of Abbas Helmi II, the mosque was again restored. Parts of the entrance were reconstructed in the 1980s.

== Architecture ==
The original layout was a simple rectangle, 29 metres (95 ft) long by 17 metres (56 ft) wide. It was a low shed with columns made from split palm tree trunks, stones and mud bricks, covered by a roof of wood and palm leaves. The floor was of gravel. Inside the building, the orientation toward Mecca was not noted by a concave niche like it would be in all later mosques. Instead, four columns were used to point out the direction of Mecca and were inserted on the qibla wall. It was large enough to provide prayer space for the commander's army but had no other adornments and no minarets.

At a point during the Fatimid era, the mosque had five minarets. There were four, with one at each corner, and one at the entrance. However, all five are now gone. The current minarets were built by Mourad Bey in 1800. Also, the Fatimid Caliph al-Mustansir added a silver belt to the prayer niche which was eventually removed by Saladin when the mosque was restored after the fire in Fustat.

The only parts of the mosque's older structure that can still be seen are some of the architraves, which can be viewed along the southern wall of the mosque. These were probably added during reconstruction in 827 CE.

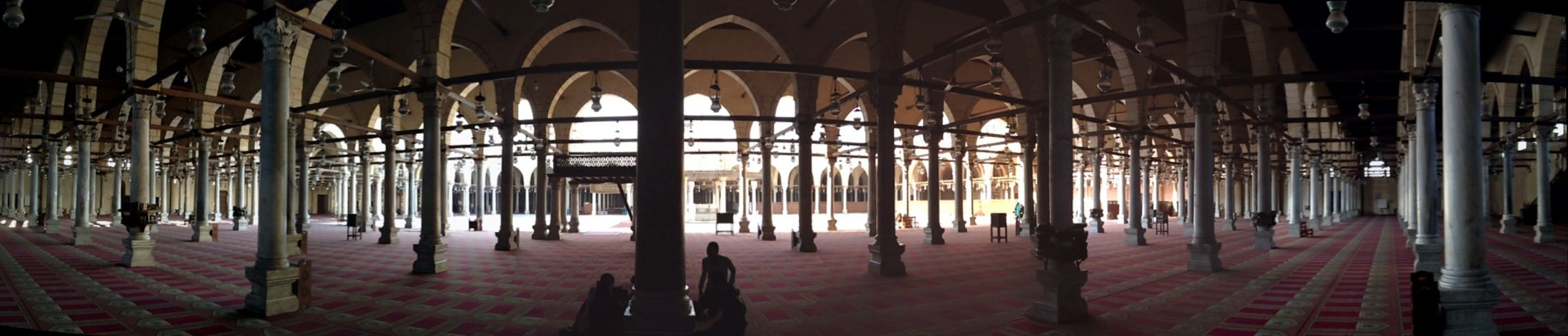
Panorama view of the interior of the Mosque

== See also ==
- Islam in Egypt
- List of mosques in Cairo
- List of mosques in Egypt
