= Fustat =

First capital of Islamic Egypt, in Old Cairo

Fustat الفسطاط
- Capital of Egypt, 641–750, 905–973
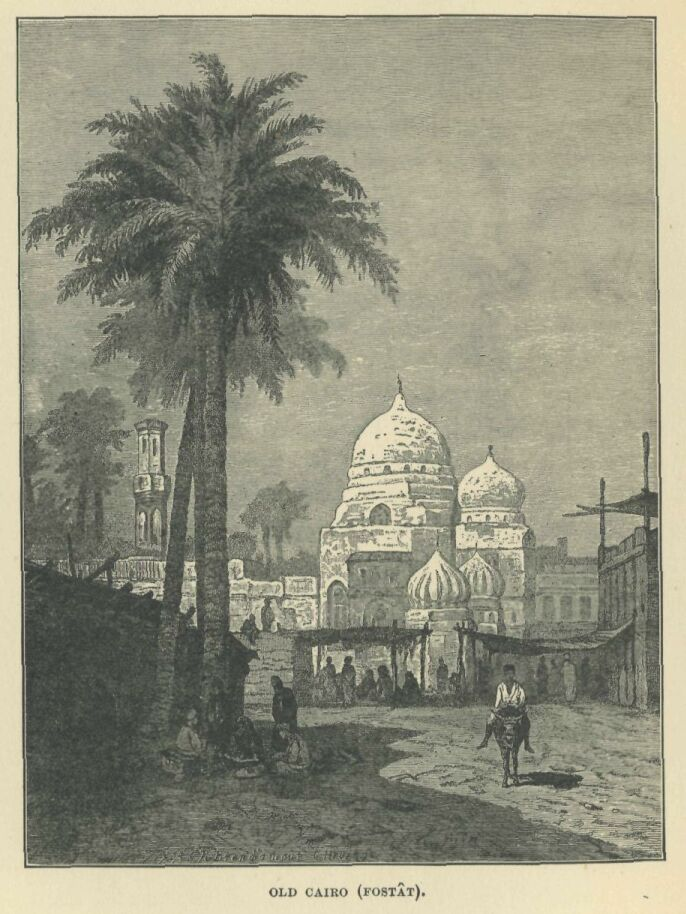
- A drawing of Fustat, from Rappoport's History of Egypt
- Nickname: City of the Tents
- Historical location in Egypt
- Coordinates: 30°00′18″N 31°14′15″E
- Currently part of: Old Cairo
- Rashidun Caliphate: 641–661
- Umayyad Caliphate: 661–750
- Abbasid Caliphate: 750–969
- Fatimid Caliphate: 969–1168
- Founded: 641
- Founder: 'Amr ibn al-'As

Population (12th century)
  - Total: 200,000

Fusṭāṭ (Arabic: الفسطاط, romanized: al-Fusṭāṭ) was the first capital of Egypt under Muslim rule, nowadays part of Cairo. It was built adjacent to what is now known as Old Cairo by the Rashidun Muslim general ʿAmr ibn ul-ʿĀṣ immediately after the Muslim conquest of Egypt in AD 641, and featured the Mosque of ʿAmr, the first mosque built in Egypt.

The city reached its peak in the 12th century, with a population of approximately 200,000. It was the centre of administrative power in Egypt, until it was ordered burnt in 1168 by its own vizier, Shawar, to keep its wealth out of the hands of the invading Crusaders. The remains of the city were eventually absorbed by nearby Cairo, which had been built to the north of Fustat in 969 when the Fatimids conquered the region and created a new city as a royal enclosure for the Caliph. The area fell into disrepair for hundreds of years and was used as a rubbish dump.

Today, Fustat is a suburb that lies within the modern district of Old Cairo, with few buildings remaining from its days as a capital. Many archaeological digs have revealed the wealth of buried material in the area. Many ancient items recovered from the site are on display in Cairo's Museum of Islamic Art.

== Egyptian capital ==
Fustat was the capital of Egypt for approximately 500 years. After the city's founding in 641, its authority was uninterrupted until 750, when the Abbasid dynasty staged a revolt against the Umayyads. This conflict was focused not in Egypt, but elsewhere in the Arab world. When the Abbasids gained power, they moved various capitals to more controllable areas. They had established the centre of their caliphate in Baghdad, moving the capital from its previous Umayyad location at Damascus. Similar moves were made throughout the new dynasty. In Egypt, they moved the capital from Fustat slightly north to the Abbasid city of al-Askar, which remained the capital until 868. When the Tulunid dynasty took control in 868, the Egyptian capital moved briefly to another nearby northern city, al-Qatta'i. This lasted only until 905, when al-Qatta'i was destroyed and the capital was returned to Fustat. The city again lost its status as capital city and the capital of Egypt was moved to Cairo in 973, and its own vizier, Shawar, ordered its burning in 1168, fearing it might fall into the hands of Amalric, king of the Crusader Kingdom of Jerusalem.

== Origin of name ==
According to legend, the location of Fustat was chosen by a bird: A dove laid an egg in the tent of 'Amr ibn al-'As (585–664), the Muslim conqueror of Egypt, just before he was to march against Alexandria in 641. His camp at that time was just north of the Roman fortress of Babylon. Amr declared the dove's nest as a sign from God, and the tent was left untouched as he and his troops went off to battle. When they returned victorious, Amr told his soldiers to pitch their tents around his, giving his new capital city its name, Miṣr al-Fusṭāṭ, or Fusṭāṭ Miṣr, popularly translated as 'city of the tents', though this is not an exact translation.

The word Miṣr was an ancient Semitic root designating Egypt, but in Arabic also has the meaning of a 'large city, metropolis' (or, as a verb, 'to civilize'), so the name Miṣr al-Fusṭāṭ could mean 'metropolis of the tent'. Fusṭāṭ Miṣr would mean 'the pavilion of Egypt'. (Since it lacks the article on the word Miṣr it would not be 'the pavilion of the metropolis'.) Egyptians to this day call Cairo Miṣr, or, in Egyptian Arabic, Maṣr, even though this is properly the name of the whole country of Egypt. The country's first mosque, the Mosque of Amr, was later built in 642 on the same site of the commander's tent.

== Early history ==
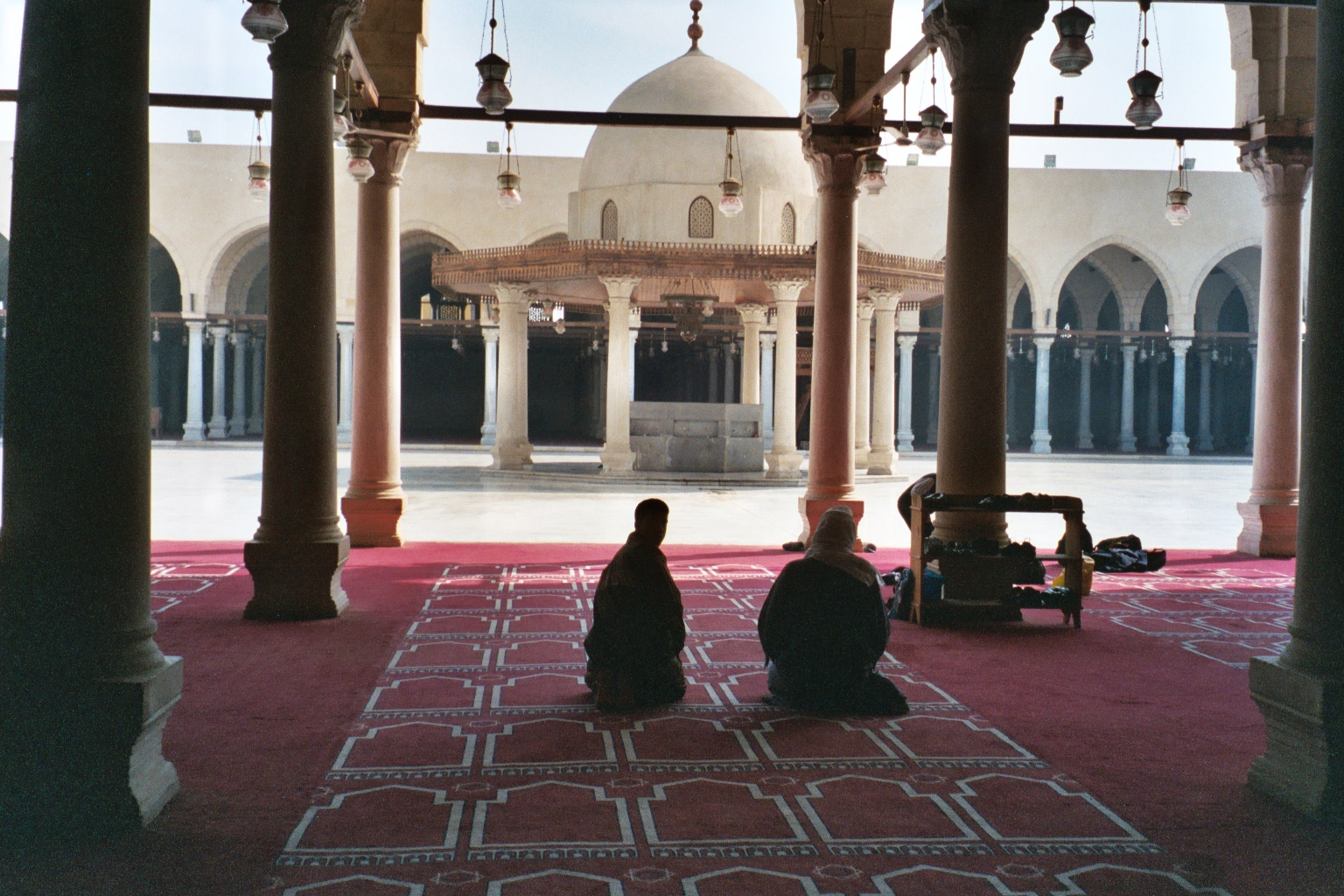
The Mosque of Amr ibn al-As. Though none of the original structure remains, this mosque was the first one built in Egypt, and it was around this location, at the site of the tent of the commander Amr ibn al-As, that the city of Fustat was built.

For thousands of years, the capital of Egypt was moved with different cultures through multiple locations up and down the Nile, such as Thebes and Memphis, depending on which dynasty was in power. After Alexander the Great conquered Egypt around 331 BC, the capital became the city named for him, Alexandria, on the Mediterranean coast. This situation remained stable for nearly a thousand years. After the army of the Arabian Caliph Umar captured the region in the 7th century, shortly after the death of Muhammad, he wanted to establish a new capital. When Alexandria fell in September 641, Amr ibn al-As, the commander of the conquering army, founded a new capital on the eastern bank of the river.

The early population of the city was composed almost entirely of soldiers and their families, and the layout of the city was similar to that of a garrison. Amr intended for Fustat to serve as a base from which to conquer North Africa, as well as to launch further campaigns against Byzantium. It remained the primary base for Arab expansion in Africa until Qayrawan was founded in Tunisia in 670.

Fustat developed as a series of tribal areas, khittas, around the central mosque and administrative buildings. The majority of the settlers came from Yemen, with the next largest grouping from western Arabia, along with some Jews and Roman mercenaries. Arabic was generally the primary spoken dialect in Egypt, and was the language of written communication. Coptic was still spoken in Fustat in the 8th century.

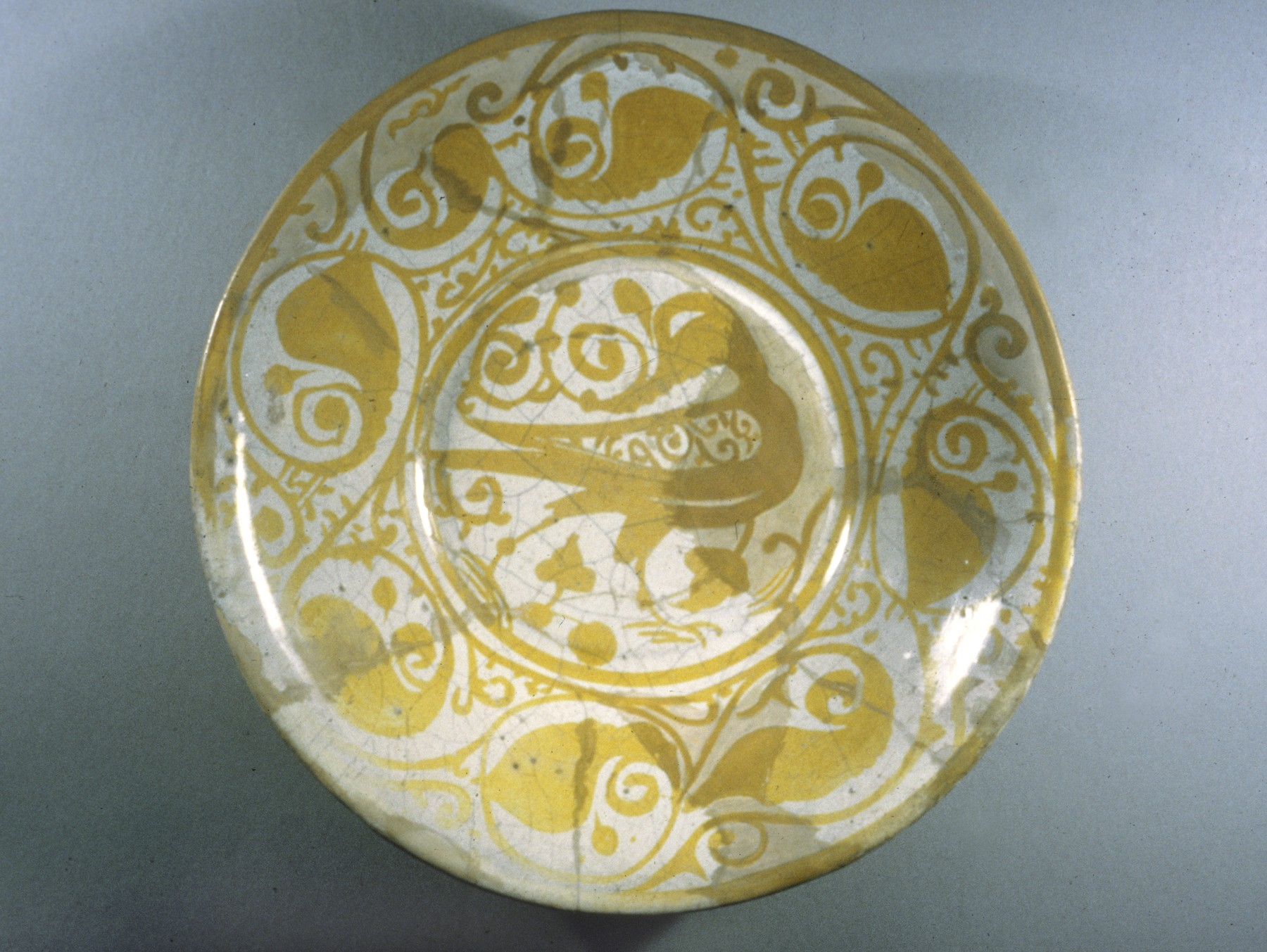
Lustreware Plate with Bird Motif, 11th century. Archaeological digs have found many kilns and ceramic fragments in Fustat, and it was likely an important production location for Islamic ceramics during the Fatimid period.

Fustat was the centre of power in Egypt under the Umayyad dynasty, which had started with the rule of Muawiyah I, and headed the Islamic caliphate from 660 to 750. However, Egypt was considered only a province of larger powers, and was ruled by governors who were appointed from other Muslim centres such as Damascus, Medina, and Baghdad. Fustat was a major city, and in the 9th century, it had a population of approximately 120,000. But when General Gawhar of the Tunisian-based Fatimids captured the region, this launched a new era when Egypt was the centre of its own power. Gawhar founded a new city just north of Fustat on August 8, 969, naming it Al Qahira (Cairo), and in 971, the Fatimid Caliph al-Mu'izz moved his court from al-Mansuriya in Tunisia to Al Qahira. But Cairo was not intended as a center of government at the time—it was used primarily as the royal enclosure for the Caliph and his court and army, while Fustat remained the capital in terms of economic and administrative power. The city thrived and grew, and in 987, the geographer Ibn Hawkal wrote that al-Fustat was approximately one third the size of Baghdad. By 1168, it had a population of 200,000.

The city was known for its prosperity, with shaded streets, gardens, and markets. It contained high-rise residential buildings, some seven storeys tall, which could reportedly accommodate hundreds of people. Al-Muqaddasi in the 10th century described them as minarets, while Nasir Khusraw in the early 11th century described some of them rising up to 14 stories, with roof gardens on the top storey complete with ox-drawn water wheels for irrigation.

The Persian traveller Nasir-i-Khusron wrote of the exotic and beautiful wares in the Fustat markets: iridescent pottery, crystal, and many fruits and flowers, even during the winter months. From 975 to 1075, Fustat was a major production centre for Islamic art and ceramics, and one of the wealthiest cities in the world. One report stated that it paid taxes that were equivalent to US$150,000 per day, to the administration of Caliph al-Mu'izz. Modern archaeological digs have turned up trade artefacts from as far away as Spain, China, and Vietnam. Excavations have also revealed intricate house and street plans; a basic unit consisted of rooms built around a central courtyard, with an arcade of arches on one side of the courtyard being the principal means of access.

== Destruction and decline ==
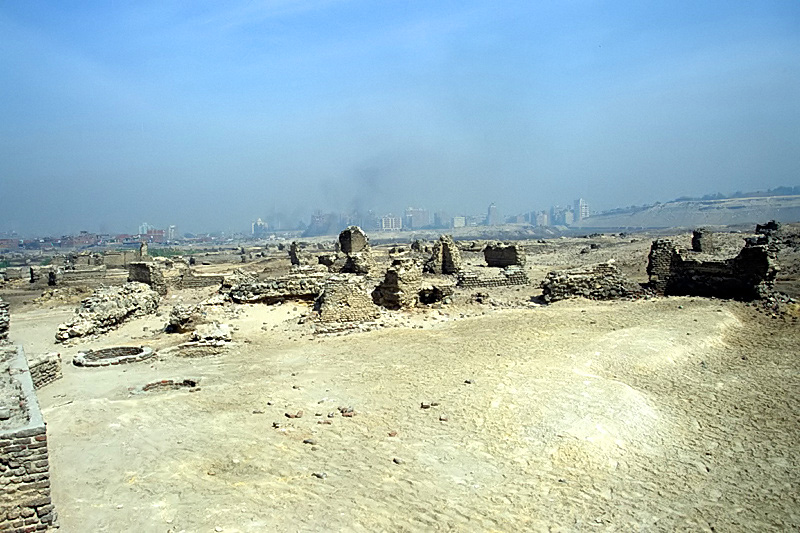
The ruins of Fustat in Old Cairo

In the mid-12th century, the caliph of Egypt was the teenager Athid, but his position was primarily ceremonial. The true power in Egypt was that of the vizier, Shawar. He had been involved in extensive political intrigue for years, working to repel the advances of both the Christian Crusaders, and the forces of the Nur al-Din from Syria. Shawar managed this by constantly shifting alliances between the two, playing them against each other, and in effect keeping them in a stalemate where neither army could successfully attack Egypt without being blocked by the other.

However, in 1168, the Christian King Amalric I of Jerusalem, who had been trying for years to launch a successful attack on Egypt in order to expand the Crusader territories, had finally achieved a certain amount of success. He and his army entered Egypt, sacked the city of Bilbeis, slaughtered nearly all of its inhabitants, and then continued on towards Fustat. Amalric and his troops camped just south of the city, and then sent a message to the young Egyptian caliph Athid, only 18 years old, to surrender the city or suffer the same fate as Bilbeis.

Seeing that Amalric's attack was imminent, Shawar ordered Fustat city burned, to keep it out of Amalric's hands. According to the Egyptian historian al-Maqrizi (1346–1442):

Shawar ordered that Fustat be evacuated. He forced [the citizens] to leave their money and property behind and flee for their lives with their children. In the panic and chaos of the exodus, the fleeing crowd looked like a massive army of ghosts.... Some took refuge in the mosques and bathhouses...awaiting a Christian onslaught similar to the one in Bilbeis. Shawar sent 20,000 naphtha pots and 10,000 lighting bombs [mish'al] and distributed them throughout the city. Flames and smoke engulfed the city and rose to the sky in a terrifying scene. The blaze raged for 54 days....

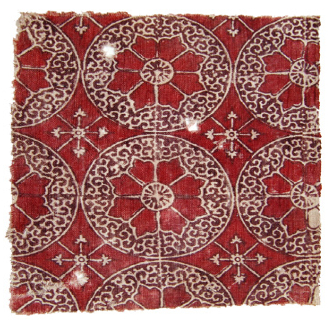
Indian textile fragment, circa 1545–1645, found in Fustat. Old, discarded textile fragments, are commonly found in the area, preserved in the dry climate of Egypt.

After the destruction of Fustat, the Syrian forces arrived and successfully repelled Amalric's forces. Then with the Christians gone, the Syrians were able to conquer Egypt themselves. The untrustworthy Shawar was put to death, and the reign of the Fatimids was effectively over. The Syrian general Shirkuh was placed in power, but died due to ill health just a few months later, after which his nephew Saladin became vizier of Egypt on March 2, 1169, launching the Ayyubid dynasty.

With Fustat no more than a dying suburb, the center of government moved permanently to nearby Cairo. Saladin later attempted to unite Cairo and Fustat into one city by enclosing them in massive walls, although this proved to be largely unsuccessful.

In 1166 Maimonides went to Egypt and settled in Fustat, where he gained much renown as a physician, practising in the family of Saladin and in that of his vizier Ḳaḍi al-Faḍil al-Baisami, and Saladin's successors. The title Ra'is al-Umma or al-Millah (Head of the Nation or of the Faith), was bestowed upon him. In Fustat, he wrote his Mishneh Torah (1180) and The Guide for the Perplexed. Some of his writings were later discovered among the manuscript fragments in the geniza (storeroom) of the Ben Ezra Synagogue, located in Fustat.

While the Mamluks were in power from the 13th century to the 16th century, the area of Fustat was used as a rubbish dump, though it still maintained a population of thousands, with the primary crafts being those of pottery and trash-collecting. The layers of garbage accumulated over hundreds of years, and gradually the population decreased, leaving what had once been a thriving city a wasteland.

== Modern Fustat ==
Today, little remains of the grandeur of the old city. The three capitals, Fustat, al-Askar and al-Qatta'i were absorbed into the growing city of Cairo. Some of the old buildings remain visible in the region known as "Old Cairo", but much of the rest has fallen into disrepair, overgrown with weeds or used as garbage dumps.

The oldest-remaining building from the area is probably the Mosque of Ibn Tulun, from the 9th century, which was built while the capital was in al-Qatta'i. The first mosque ever built in Egypt (and by extension, one of the first mosques built in Africa), the Mosque of Amr, is still in use, but has been extensively rebuilt over the centuries, and nothing remains of the original structure. In February 2017 the National Museum of Egyptian Civilisation was inaugurated on a site adjacent to the mosque.

It is believed that further archaeological digs could yield substantial rewards, considering that the remains of the original city are still preserved under hundreds of years of rubbish. Some archaeological excavations have taken place, the paths of streets are still visible, and some buildings have been partially reconstructed to waist-height. Some artifacts that have been recovered can be seen in Cairo's Museum of Islamic Art.

== Bibliography ==
- Abu-Lughod, Janet L. Cairo: 1001 Years of the City Victorious (Princeton University Press, 1971). ISBN 0-691-03085-5.
- Antoniou, Jim (March 1998). "Historic Cairo – rehabilitation of Cairo's historic monuments". Architectural Review. Vol. 203, no. 1213. Archived from the original on June 17, 2006.
- David, Rosalie (2000). The Experience of Ancient Egypt. London; New York: Routledge. ISBN 0-415-03263-6.
- Eyewitness Travel: Egypt. Dorlin Kindersley Limited, London. 2007. ISBN 978-0-7566-2875-8.
- Ghosh, Amitav, In an Antique Land (Vintage Books, 1994). ISBN 0-679-72783-3.
- Lapidus, Ira M. (1988). A History of Islamic Societies. Cambridge University Press. ISBN 0-521-22552-3.
- Maalouf, Amin (1984). The Crusades Through Arab Eyes. Al Saqi Books. ISBN 0-8052-0898-4.
- Mason, Robert B. (1995). "New Looks at Old Pots: Results of Recent Multidisciplinary Studies of Glazed Ceramics from the Islamic World". Muqarnas: Annual on Islamic Art and Architecture. XII. Brill Academic Publishers. ISBN 90-04-10314-7.
- Petersen, Andrew (1999). Dictionary of Islamic Architecture. London; New York: Routledge. ISBN 0-415-21332-0.
- Yeomans, Richard (2006). The Art and Architecture of Islamic Cairo. Garnet & Ithaca Press. ISBN 1-85964-154-7.
- Williams, Caroline (2002). Islamic Monuments in Cairo: The Practical Guide. American University in Cairo Press. ISBN 977-424-695-0.

Preceded by Alexandria	Capital of Egypt; 641–750	Succeeded by al-Askar
Preceded by al-Qatta'i	Capital of Egypt; 905–1169	Succeeded by Cairo
