= Quşçu, Shamakhi =

Gushchu
- Municipality
- Azerbaijani: Quşçu
- Location within Azerbaijan
- Coordinates: 40°26′14″N 48°44′21″E
- Country: Azerbaijan
- District: Shamakhi

Population
  - Total: 4,097
- Time zone: UTC+4 (AZT)
  - Summer (DST): UTC+5 (AZT)

Quşçu (also, Gushchu) is a village and municipality in the Shamakhi District of Azerbaijan. It has a population of 4,097. The municipality consists of the villages of Gushchu, Laləzar, and Aşkar.
