= Asgar Khanlu =

Asgar Khanlu (Persian: اصگرخانلو) may refer to:

- Asgar Khanlu, Ardabil
- Asgar Khanlu, East Azerbaijan
