= Qaleh-ye Askar =

Qaleh-ye Askar or Qaleh Askar (Persian: قلعه عسكر), also rendered as Qaleh-ye Asgar and Qaleh Asgar may refer to:

- Qaleh-ye Askar, Bam
- Qaleh Askar, Bardsir
- Qaleh Asgar Rural District
