= Laləzar =

Village in Azerbaijan

Coordinates: 40.4556°N 48.7323°E

Laləzar is a village in the municipality of Quşçu in the Shamakhi Rayon of Azerbaijan.
