= Asgarlu =

Asgarlu عسگرلو
- Village
- Location within Iran
- Coordinates: 38°59′27″N 47°45′53″E
- Country: Iran
- Province: East Azerbaijan
- County: Ahar
- Bakhsh: Hurand
- Rural District: Chahardangeh

Population (2006)
  - Total: 76
- Time zone: UTC+3:30 (IRST)
  - Summer (DST): UTC+4:30 (IRDT)

Asgarlu (Persian: عسگرلو, romanized: ʿAsgarlū; also known as ‘Asgar Khānlū) is a village in Chahardangeh Rural District, Hurand District, Ahar County, East Azerbaijan Province, Iran. At the 2006 census, its population was 76, in 18 families.
