= Ali Asgar, Lorestan =

Ali Asgar علي عسگر
- Village
- Location within Iran
- Coordinates: 33°24′54″N 47°15′44″E
- Country: Iran
- Province: Lorestan
- County: Kuhdasht
- Bakhsh: Kunani
- Rural District: Kunani

Population (2006)
  - Total: 127
- Time zone: UTC+3:30 (IRST)
  - Summer (DST): UTC+4:30 (IRDT)

Ali Asgar (Persian: علي عسگر, also Romanized as ʿAlī ʿAsgar; also known as Menār, Menār-e Saţorvand, and Monār) is a village in Kunani Rural District, Kunani District, Kuhdasht County, Lorestan Province, Iran. At the 2006 census, its population was 127, in 25 families.
