= Askariyeh, Taft =

Askariyeh عسكريه
- Village
- Location within Iran
- Coordinates: 31°40′00″N 53°49′59″E
- Country: Iran
- Province: Yazd
- County: Taft
- Bakhsh: Central
- Rural District: Aliabad

Population (2006)
  - Total: 21
- Time zone: UTC+3:30 (IRST)
  - Summer (DST): UTC+4:30 (IRDT)

Askariyeh (Persian: عسكريه, romanized: ‘Askarīyeh), also known as Asgarīyeh, is a village in Aliabad Rural District, in the Central District of Taft County, Yazd Province, Iran. At the 2006 census, its population was 21, in 6 families.
