= Boneh-ye Amir Asgar =

Boneh-ye Amir Asgar بنه اميرعسگر
- Village
- Location within Iran
- Coordinates: 31°14′01″N 49°38′46″E
- Country: Iran
- Province: Khuzestan
- County: Ramhormoz
- Bakhsh: Central
- Rural District: Howmeh-ye Sharqi

Population (2006)
  - Total: 170
- Time zone: UTC+3:30 (IRST)
  - Summer (DST): UTC+4:30 (IRDT)

Boneh-ye Amir Asgar (Persian: بنه اميرعسگر, also Romanized as Boneh-ye Āmīr ‘Asgar; also known as Boneh-ye ‘Asgar) is a village in Howmeh-ye Sharqi Rural District, in the Central District of Ramhormoz County, Khuzestan Province, Iran. At the 2006 census, its population was 170, in 34 families.
