= Ali Asgar, Chaharmahal and Bakhtiari =

Ali Asgar علي عسگر
- Village
- Country: Iran
- Province: Chaharmahal and Bakhtiari
- County: Ardal
- Bakhsh: Miankuh
- Rural District: Shalil

Population (2006)
  - Total: 203
- Time zone: UTC+3:30 (IRST)
  - Summer (DST): UTC+4:30 (IRDT)

Ali Asgar (Persian: علي عسگر, also Romanized as ʿAlī ʿAsgar) is a village in Shalil Rural District, Miankuh District, Ardal County, Chaharmahal and Bakhtiari Province, Iran. At the 2006 census, its population was 203, in 44 families.
