= Mohamed Askar =

Sri Lankan cricketer (born 1986)

Mohamed Askar (born 13 December 1986) is a Sri Lankan cricketer. He is a left-handed batsman and slow left-arm bowler who plays for Burgher Recreation Club. He was born in Ragama.

Askar, who made his cricketing debut for the Under-23s team in 2009, made his List A debut during the 2009–10 season, against Sebastianites.

Asker followed this up with a 61-run haul against Seeduwa Raddoluwa Sports Club, his highest score to date and his only half-century thus far in first-class cricket.
