= Al-Askar =

Ancient Egyptian capital city, in Old Cairo

al-‘Askar العسكر
- Former capital
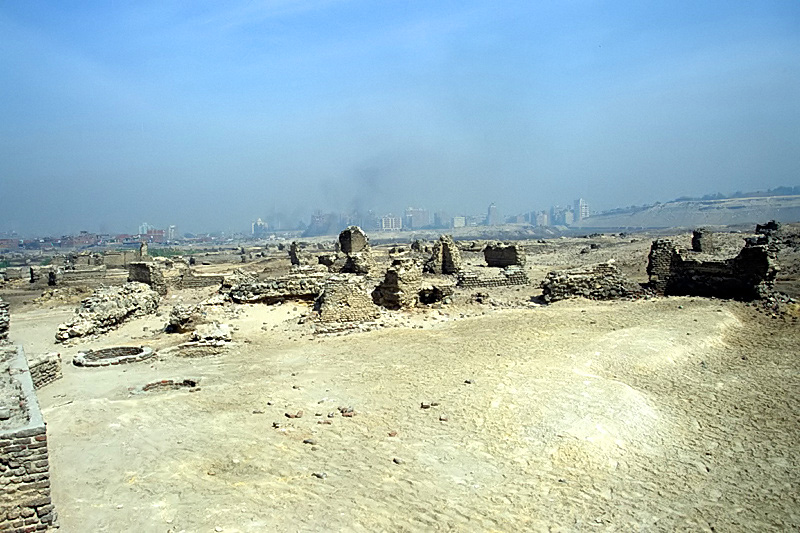
- Nickname: City of Cantonments or of Sections
- Historical location in Egypt
- Coordinates: 30°01′26″N 31°14′52″E
- Currently part of: Old Cairo
- Abbasid Caliphate: 750–868, 905-969
- Tulunid Emirate: 868–905

Al-‘Askar (Arabic: العسكر) was the capital of Egypt from 750–868, when Egypt was a province of the Abbasid Caliphate.

== History ==
=== Background ===
After the Muslim conquest of Egypt in 641, Fustat was established, just north of Coptic Cairo and the regional capital of Egypt was moved from Alexandria to the new city on the eastern side of the Nile.

=== Abbasid regional capital (750-868) ===
The Rashiduns were followed by the Umayyads, who ruled until they were overthrown by the Abbasids in 750, when the Umayyad regional capital of Fustat was replaced with an Abbasid city slightly north of it, al-‘Askar. Its full name was Arabic: مدينة العسكري, romanized: Madinatu l-‘Askari, lit. 'City of Cantonments or City of Sections'. Intended primarily as a city large enough to house an army, it was laid out in a grid pattern that could be easily subdivided into separate sections for various groups, such as merchants and officers.

The peak of the Abbasid dynasty occurred during the reign of Harun al Rashid (r. 786-809), along with increased taxes on the Egyptians, who rose up in a peasant revolt in 832 during the time of Caliph al-Ma'mun (r. 813-833).

Local Egyptian governors gained increasing autonomy, and in 870, governor Ahmad ibn Tulun declared Egypt's independence (though still nominally under the rule of the Abbasid Caliph). As a symbol of this independence, in 868 ibn Tulun founded yet another capital, al-Qatta'i, slightly further north of al-‘Askar.

=== After 868 ===
Al-‘Askar, Fusṭāṭ, and, after the 1168 fire that destroyed old Fustat, nearby al-Qāhirah (Cairo) became capitals of Egypt, the latter keeping this position to this day. Cairo's boundaries grew to eventually encompass the three earlier capitals of al-Fusṭāṭ, al-Qatta'i and al-‘Askar, the remnants of which can today be seen in "Old Cairo" in the southern part of the city.

Preceded by Fustat	Capital of Egypt; 750-868	Succeeded by Al-Qatta'i
