= Askariyeh, Yazd =

Askariyeh عسكريه
- village
- Interactive map of Askariyeh
- Coordinates: 31°50′N 54°28′E
- Country: Iran
- Province: Yazd
- County: Yazd
- Bakhsh: Central
- Rural District: Fahraj

Population (2006)
  - Total: 542
- Time zone: UTC+3:30 (IRST)
  - Summer (DST): UTC+4:30 (IRDT)

Askariyeh (Persian: عسكريه, also Romanized as ‘Askarīyeh) is a village in Fahraj Rural District, in the Central District of Yazd County, Yazd Province, Iran. At the 2006 census, its population was 542, in 133 families.
