= Murtada Sharif 'Askari =

Islamic scholar (1914–2007)

Sayyid Murtadha Alaskari (Allamah Askari)
- Born: سید مرتضی عسکری; 14 May 1914; Samarra, Iraq
- Died: 16 September 2007 (aged 93); Tehran, Iran

Philosophical work
- Main interests: History of Islam
- Website: en.alaskari.org

Sayyid Murtada Al-Askari (Persian: سید مرتضی عسکری; 4 May 1914 – 16 September 2007), known as Allamah 'Askari, was a Shia scholar and a neo-religious thinker. He took a scholarly approach to the history of Islam. 150 So-Called Companions, Recourse to the Prophet and Consecration to his Relict, and Abdullah ibn Saba and Other Historical Legends are some of his more significant books.

== Early life and education ==
'Askari was born in Samarra, Iraq, on 14 May 1914. His ancestors were amongst the jurisprudence traditionalists of their era. In the 17th century, Allamah Majlisi invited his ancestors to Saveh (in today's Iran) and gave them the title of Shaykh al-Islam (a position equivalent to the Imam of Friday prayers). A number of Sunni people converted to Shiism by his ancestors' guidance in the city of Saveh, Allamah 'Askari said. He lost his father when he was child and his maternal grandmother raised him.

'Askari entered the seminary in Samarra at age 10. His education expenses were funded by his landed properties in Saveh. However, sending money from Iran to Iraq was banned by Reza Shah Pahlavi, who took power in 1925. Therefore, 'Askari went to Iran and continued his education at the Qom Seminary under the guidance of Abdul-Karim Ha'eri Yazdi. He lived at the Fiyziyyih school, where his roommate was Ali Safi Golpaygani.

'Askari did not stay long at Qom. During that time, teaching of the exegesis of the Quran and Hadith was rare in the seminary of Qom; 'Askari collaborated with some of the more well-educated men and requested the scholar Mirza Khalili Kumriyi teach this method to study the religious text. Most of the student body disagreed with such a class and closed it down, and a sorrowful 'Askari returned to Samarra.

== Founding the university ==
'Askari believed that the educational system designed by the Orientalist for the eastern countries cannot respond to the increasing quandary and development of the Islamic society. Therefore, he and his like-minded colleagues decided to reform the educational system. He made innovations and conversions both in practical and theoretical field.

In Baghdad, 'Allama 'Askari founded a new and modern university named Usul al-Din ("Foundation of faith"). Exegesis of Quran, the science of knowing Hadith, theology and comparative theology were taught in the university. The university was shut down by the Ba'ath Party coup d'état.

== Scholarly work ==
Allama 'Askari primarily focused on historical studies. He wrote more than 50 books. Two of them, Abdullah Ibn Saba' and 150 (So-Called) Companions, surprised the researchers and the public alike, necessitating further research on the subjects over centuries. The latter book discussed 150 people who never existed, yet were believed by many to be the companions of Muhammad. As a result, multiple schools of thought which were built by Muhammad ibn Jarir al-Tabari and many prominent historians were refuted. 'Askari argued that these subject matters, which many had assumed were indisputable truths and fact, had no basis in fact. He continued his activities in several fields, especially in social affairs, and founded many schools and clinics.

In addition, he was concerned with the unity of Islamic Ummah and the relationships between the branches of Muslims. His believed his words would be admitted if the Shiites freed themselves from historical accusations by the Sunnis, and therefore devoted his efforts to disprove these accusations that caused hostility to the Shiites.

== Death ==
On 16 September 2007, 'Askari died at Milad hospital in Tehran after a lengthy illness. He was 93 years old.

== Bibliography ==
Some of his main works include:

=== Quranic discussions ===
- The Quran in the era of the messenger (Muhammad) and after him.
- The Quran and the narrations of the Caliphs school.
- The Quran and the narrations of Ahl-Al-Bait's school (discussing what professor Ehsan Elahi Dhahir has claimed that there are a thousand Shia hadiths about the distortion of the Quran that Allameh Askari explains the falsity of the professor's claim.)

=== Islamic teachings ===
- Talim al-Islam (Teachings Islam).
- selected supplications.
- Islamic Adab (Islamic behavior).
- Governing in Islam.
- Aqaed al-Islam men al-Quran al-Karim (The beliefs of Islam from the Quran) in 3 volumes which are as follows:
  1. Aqaed al-Islam men al-mabda hatal-maad (The beliefs of Islam from the beginning of creation until the resurrection)
  2. Sair al-anbiya wal awsiya (the life style of the Prophets and the awsiya)
  3. Al-sharia al-khatema.
- Maalem Al-Madrasatain are as follows in 4 volumes:
  1. researches of the two schools (Caliphs and Ahl al-bayt school) about the Sahaba (companions) and the imamate.
  2. researches of the two schools (Caliphs and Ahl al-bait school) in the source of the Islamic Sharia.
  3. the impact of the uprising of Husayn ibn Ali in reviving the Sunnah of Muhammad.
  4. the spreading of the ideas of the two schools and their position from the Mughal's campaign and what was defamed against the Ahl al-bait school from the second century until the twelfth century.

=== Collection of studies on the Sunnah (tradition) of Muhammad ===
- ahadith Umm Al-Mu’minin Aisha (saying from Aisha and roles from her life).
- Abdullah ibn Saba & the other legends.
- one hundred and fifty fake companions.
- On the table of the Book (Quran) and the Sunnah of Muhammad:
1. from the messenger's Sunnah (tradition) crying on the dead.
2. celebrating the remembrance of the prophets and the righteous servants of Allah.
3. from the messenger's Sunnah prayer to Muhammad and to Muhammad's family.
4. the justice of the companions.
5. Verse of Purification.
6. from the messenger's saying: this Ummah has twelve caretakers.
7. The Quran in the narrations and monuments.
8. Bada.
9. temporary marriage in Islam.
10. study on force and authorization and fate and destiny and hadith al-kisa.
11. the infallibility of the prophets and messengers.
12. the permission to rebuild the graves of Muhammad and the allies of Allah and worship in them.
13. recourse to the prophet of god and get blessed to his monuments.
14. attributes of god almighty in the two schools.
15. The Shias of the prophet's household.

=== The role of the Imams in reviving the religion ===
This book is in 16 volumes and in Persian, was translated in three volumes in English.

== See also ==
- History of Islam
- Islamic literature
