= Hossein Askari (economist) =

International relations scholar

- Born: Iran

Hossein Askari (economist) is a scholar of economic development in the Middle East and in Islam and the founder of Islamicity Indices, a benchmark to build effective institutions for political, social and economic reform and progress.

== Biography ==
Askari was born in Iran and received his elementary and secondary education in the United Kingdom. He then came to the United States where he earned his SB in Civil Engineering, attended the MIT Sloan School of Management, and received his PhD in Economics, all at the Massachusetts Institute of Technology. He was an instructor at MIT, and started his academic career in 1969 as an Assistant Professor of Economics at Tufts University, becoming Associate Professor at Wayne State University in 1973, and Associate Professor of International Business and Middle Eastern Studies at the University of Texas at Austin in 1975 and Professor in 1978. Askari taught at George Washington University (GW) from 1982 to 2019, where he served as Chairman of the International Business Department and as Director of the Institute of Global Management and Research and was the Aryamehr-Iran Professor of International Business and International Affairs from 1998 to January 2019, when he became Emeritus Professor.

Askari served for two and a half years on the Executive Board of the International Monetary Fund and was Special Advisor to the Minister of Finance of Saudi Arabia; in this capacity he frequently spoke for Saudi Arabia at the IMF Executive Board; he assisted in the negotiations of a $10 billion loan to the IMF; and he developed the idea of a special Quota increase for Saudi Arabia, giving Saudi Arabia an effective permanent seat on the IMF and World Bank Executive Boards and promoting Saudi Arabia’s membership to the important G-20 Committee. During the mid-1980s, he directed an international team that developed the first comprehensive domestic, regional and international energy models and plan for Saudi Arabia. During 1990-1991 he was asked by the governments of Iran and Saudi Arabia to act as an intermediary to restore diplomatic relations; and in 1992 he was asked by the Emir of Kuwait to mediate with Iran. He mediated the financial dispute between the National Iranian Oil Company and two American oil companies, Atlantic Richfield and Sunoco, at the Iran-United States Tribunal at The Hague.

Askari has written on economic development in the Middle East, Islamic economics and finance, international trade and finance, agricultural economics, oil economics and on economic sanctions. He has authored 35 books and over 140 professional articles. His other writing over four decades has appeared in numerous outlets including: The New York Times, The Washington Post, The Los Angeles Times, The San Francisco Chronicle, The Denver Post, The Christian Science Monitor, The Chicago Tribune, U.S. News and World Report, The National Interest, The Portland Press Herald, Asia Times, Tehran Times, The Huffington Post, and Medium.

In 2005, he was a speaker for the motion, “This House believes that oil has been more of a curse than a blessing for the Middle East,” at the Doha Debates. The motion passed with a wide margin. (https://www.youtube.com/watch?v=LieEjeUyT3I)

== Islamicity Indices ==
Hossein Askari developed the concept of Islamicity Indices in 2007. He has followed up this research with articles, books and lectures. One book, Islamicity Indices: The Seed For Change, was published in 2015, and another, Reformation and Development in the Muslim World: Islamicity Indices as Benchmark, in 2017. Islamicity Indices have a dedicated website (http://islamicity-index.org) with articles, podcasts and the latest indices, which are updated annually. These indices provide a concise method of conveying Islam's fundamental teachings, a benchmark for assessing how well Muslim communities have adopted these teachings and a roadmap for reformation and development of these communities. The tax-exempt Islamicity Foundation has been incorporated with the mission to stimulate peaceful reform and effective institutions in Muslim countries, using Islamicity Indices as the instrument and moral compass for achieving this goal.

Askari has argued that Islam was hijacked almost immediately after the prophet Mohammad’s death by rulers. Oppressive and corrupt rulers supported by pliant clerics upended the fundamental teachings of the Quran in order to gain absolute power and live in opulence as they subjugated their people. More recently, Muslim dictators have been supported by selfish foreign powers. At the same time, Muslims have been fed a message of Islam that is focused on the largely mechanical facets of the religion, the five pillars, popularized by academics and have been prevented from debating the meaning of the teachings and their practice contained in the Quran. Islamicity Indices demonstrate that countries such as Switzerland, Sweden, Denmark, Norway and New Zealand better reflect Islamic teachings and their envisioned institutions than do countries that profess Islam. As Muslims find little hope for a better future in oppressive societies, terrorists have been provided with an army of recruits to overthrow Muslim dictatorships and to cause harm to their superpower backers in the West. Islamicity Indices provide a compass and a benchmark for Muslims to debate the meaning and application of their religion, to monitor their successes and failures, to build effective institutions and to achieve a turnaround in the framework of Quranic teachings.

== Books ==
- Conceptions of Justice from Islam to the Present (Palgrave Macmillan, April 2019), co-authored with Abbas Mirakhor.
- Conceptions of Justice from Earliest History to Islam (Palgrave Macmillan, April 2019), co-authored with Abbas Mirakhor.
- Resource Rich Muslim Countries and Islamic Institutional Reforms (Peter Lang Publishing, March 2018), co-authored with Liza Mydin and Abbas Mirakhor.
- Ideal Islamic Economy: An Introduction (Palgrave Macmillan, July 2017), co-authored with Abbas Mirakhor.
- Reformation and Development in the Muslim World: Islamicity Indices as Benchmark (Palgrave Macmillan, June 2017), co-authored with Hossein Mohammadkhan and Liza Mydin.
- Islamicity Indices: The Seed For Change (Palgrave Macmillan, November 2015), co-authored with Hossein Mohammadkhan
- The Next Financial Crisis and How to Save Capitalism (Palgrave Macmillan, June 2015), co-authored with Abbas Mirakhor
- Introduction to Islamic Economics: Theory and Application (John Wiley and Sons, January 2015), co-authored with Zamir Iqbal and Abbas Mirakhor
- The Gold Standard Anchored in Islamic Finance (Palgrave Macmillan, December 2014), co-authored with Noureddine Krichene
- Challenges in Economic and Financial Policy Formulation: An Islamic Perspective (Palgrave Macmillan, December 2014), co-authored with Zamir Iqbal and Abbas Mirakhor
- Conflicts in the Persian Gulf: Origins and Evolution (Palgrave Macmillan, October 2013)
- Collaborative Colonialism: The Political Economy of Oil in the Persian Gulf (Palgrave Macmillan, September 2013)
- Conflicts and Wars: Their Fallout and Prevention (Palgrave Macmillan, July 2012)
- Risk Sharing in Finance: The Islamic Finance Alternative (John Wiley and Sons, December 2011), co-authored with Zamir Iqbal, Noureddine Krichene and Abbas Mirakhor
- Islam and the Path to Human and Economic Development (Palgrave Macmillan, August 2010), co-authored with Abbas Mirakhor
- The Stability of Islamic Finance (John Wiley, January 2010), co-authored with Zamir Iqbal, Noureddine Krichene and Abbas Mirakhor
- Corruption and its Manifestation in the Persian Gulf (Edward Elgar, August 2010), co-authored with Scheherazade Rehman and Noora Arfaa
- Globalization and Islamic Finance: Convergence, Prospects, and Challenges (John Wiley, 2009), co-authored with Zamir Iqbal and Abbas Mirakhor
- New Issues in Islamic Finance: Progress and Challenges (John Wiley, September 2008), co-authored with Zamir Iqbal and Abbas Mirakhor
- The Militarization of the Persian Gulf (Edward Elgar, December 2009), co-authored with Amin Mohseni and Shahrzad Daneshvar
- The Middle East Exporters: What Happened to Economic Development? (Edward Elgar, December 2006)
- Economic Sanctions: Examining Their Philosophy and Efficacy (Praeger Publishers, 2003) co-authored with John Forrer, Hildy Teegen and Jiawen Yang
- Case Studies of U.S. Economic Sanctions: The Chinese, Cuban and Iranian Experience (Praeger Publishers, 2003) co-authored with John Forrer, Hildy Teegen and Jiawen Yang
- Economic Development in the Countries of the GCC: The Curse and Blessing of Oil (JAI Press, 1997), co-authored with Vahid Nowshirvani and Mohamed Jaber
- Third World Debt And Financial Innovation: The Experiences of Chile and Mexico and Innovation Financiere et Dette du Tiers-Monde: Le Cas du Chili et du Mexique (OECD, 1991)
- Saudi Arabia: Oil and the Search for Economic Development (JAI Press, 1990)
- Taxation and Tax Policies in the Middle East (Butterworth Publishers, 1982), co-authored with John Cummings and Michael Glover
- Oil, OECD and the Third World: A Vicious Triangle (The University of Texas Press, 1978), co-authored with John Cummings
- Agricultural Supply Response: A Survey of the Econometric Evidence (Praeger, 1976), co-authored with John Cummings
- The Economies of the Middle East in the 1970s: A Comparative Approach (Praeger, 1976), co-authored with John Cummings
