= Askar, Bangladesh =

Askar আস্কর
- Location in Bangladesh
- Coordinates: 23°57′N 90°5′E
- Country: Bangladesh
- Division: Barisal Division
- District: Barisal District
- Time zone: UTC+6 (Bangladesh Time)

Askar is a village in Agailjhara Upazila in Barisal District in the Barisal Division of southern-central Bangladesh.
