= Emamzadeh Askar =

Emamzadeh Askar امامزاده عسكر
- Village
- Location within Iran
- Coordinates: 30°44′58″N 50°21′30″E
- Country: Iran
- Province: Kohgiluyeh and Boyer-Ahmad
- County: Bahmai
- Bakhsh: Central
- Rural District: Kafsh Kanan

Population (2006)
  - Total: 17
- Time zone: UTC+3:30 (IRST)
  - Summer (DST): UTC+4:30 (IRDT)

Emamzadeh Askar (Persian: امامزاده عسكر, also Romanized as Emāmzādeh ʿAskar; also known as Emāmzādeh ʿAsgar) is a village in Kafsh Kanan Rural District, in the Central District of Bahmai County, Kohgiluyeh and Boyer-Ahmad Province, Iran. By the 2006 census, its population was 17 in 4 families.
