= List of historical capitals of Egypt =

Over the course of its history, Egypt has had many capitals. The earliest, at the time of Egypt's unification c. 3100 BCE, was Tjenu, better known as Thinis, which may have also been the capital of the hypothetical Thinite Confederacy prior to the unified kingdom. During the First, Second and Third Intermediate Periods, Egypt had multiple capitals held by rival dynasties. The current de jure capital of Egypt is Cairo, and since 2 April 2024, its seat of government and de facto capital has been the New Capital, a new planned city 45 kilometers to the east.

Cairo, still Egypt's de jure capital, has held this status since 972. This makes Cairo Egypt's longest-running capital city, having retained this status for over 1,050 years under the rule of six dynasties followed by the British protectorate of Egypt and the Republic of Egypt. Alexandria was the second longest-lasting capital of Egypt, being used for the entirety of the Greco-Roman period, which lasted for 973 years. Memphis was the capital of Egypt for over 700 years and was the seat of the power for the whole of the Old Kingdom period. Thebes was used as the capital for approximately 485 years, mostly during the Middle and New Kingdoms.

Locations of the historical capitals (Al-Askar and Al-Qata'i are located within the administrative borders of modern Cairo, which can be confirmed especially by Google Maps by typing the Arabic name of Al-Qata'i; Fustat, with a tiny text on this map, is located south of Cairo)

== List of Egyptian capitals ==
Common Name	Name variations	Founder	Time Period	Ruling Dynasties	Ref.
Naqada	Ancient Egyptian: Nbyt; Ancient Greek: Παμπανις Pampanis; Coptic: ⲛⲉⲕⲁⲧⲏⲣⲓⲟⲛ Nekatērion; Egyptian Arabic: نقادة Naqāda		c. 3200–3150 BCE	Naqada III	
Thinis	Ancient Egyptian: Tjenu; Ancient Greek: Θίνις Thinis, Θίς This; Coptic: Ⲧⲓⲛ; Egyptian Arabic: طين		c. 3150–2686 BCE	First Dynasty; Second Dynasty	
Memphis	Ancient Egyptian (First Intermediate Period): Djed-Sut; Ancient Egyptian (Middle Kingdom): Ankh-Tawy; Ancient Egyptian (New Kingdom): mn-nfr, Men-nefer; Ancient Greek: Μέμφις, Memphis; Coptic: ⲙⲉⲙϥⲓ, Memfi; Egyptian Arabic: مَنْف Manf	Menes (Traditional)	c. 2686–2160 BCE c. 720–664 BCE; 525–404 BCE; 343–332 BCE	Third Dynasty; Fourth Dynasty; Fifth Dynasty; Sixth Dynasty; Seventh Dynasty; Eighth Dynasty; Twenty-fifth Dynasty (Kush Empire); Twenty-seventh Dynasty (Achaemenid Empire); Thirty-first Dynasty (Achaemenid Empire)	
Heracleopolis Magna	Ancient Egyptian: nn nswt, Henen-Nesut; Ancient Greek: Μεγάλη Ἡρακλέους πόλις, Megálē Herakléous pólis Coptic: Ϩⲛⲏⲥ, Hnes; Egyptian Arabic: اهناس, Ahnas		c. 2160–2040 BCE	Ninth Dynasty; Tenth Dynasty	
Thebes	Ancient Egyptian: wꜣs.t, Waset; Ancient Greek: Θῆβαι, Thēbai; Egyptian Arabic: طيبة, Tyba		c. 2130–1991 BCE c. 1650–1346 BCE c. 1332–1279 BCE; 664–656 BCE	Eleventh Dynasty; Sixteenth Dynasty; Seventeenth Dynasty; Eighteenth Dynasty; Nineteenth Dynasty; Twenty-fifth Dynasty (Kush Empire)	
Itjtawy	Ancient Egyptian: Itjtawy or Amenemhat-itjtawy	Amenemhat I	c. 1991–1650 BCE	Twelfth Dynasty; Thirteenth Dynasty	
Avaris	Ancient Egyptian: ḥw.t wꜥr.t, hut-waret Ancient Greek: Αὔαρις, Auaris; Egyptian Arabic: اڤاريس, Avaris	Amenemhat I	c. 1725–1550 BCE	Fourteenth Dynasty; Fifteenth Dynasty (Hyksos)	
Amarna	Ancient Egyptian: Akhetaten; Egyptian Arabic: العمارنة, al-ʿAmārna	Akhenaten	c. 1346–1332 BCE	Eighteenth Dynasty (Amarna Period)	
Pi-Ramesses	Ancient Egyptian: pr-rꜥ-ms-sw, Pi-Ramesses	Ramesses II	c. 1279–1077 BCE	Nineteenth Dynasty; Twentieth Dynasty	
Tanis	Ancient Egyptian: ḏꜥn.t Ancient Greek: Τάνις, Tanis; Coptic: ϫⲁⲛⲓ Egyptian Arabic: صان الحجر, Ṣān al-Ḥaǧar		c. 1077–943 BCE	Twenty-first Dynasty	
Bubastis	Ancient Egyptian: Pr-Bȝst.t, Per-Bast; Ancient Greek: Βούβαστις, Boubastis; Coptic: Ⲡⲟⲩⲃⲁⲥϯ, Poubasti; Egyptian Arabic: Tell-Basta		c. 943–720 BCE	Twenty-second Dynasty	
Leontopolis	Ancient Egyptian: Taremu; Ancient Greek: Λεόντων πόλις, Leontopolis; Egyptian Arabic: Tell el-Muqdam		c. 837–720 BCE	Twenty-third Dynasty	
Sais	Ancient Egyptian: Sꜣw; Ancient Greek: Σάϊς; Coptic: Ⲥⲁⲓ; Egyptian Arabic: صا الحجر, Sa el-Hagar		c. 732–720 BCE; 664–525 BCE; 404–398 BCE	Twenty-fourth Dynasty; Twenty-sixth Dynasty; Twenty-eighth Dynasty	
Mendes	Ancient Egyptian: Djedet; Ancient Greek: Μένδης; Egyptian Arabic: تل الربع, Tell el-Ruba		398–380 BCE	Twenty-ninth Dynasty	
Samannud	Ancient Egyptian: ṯb-(n)-nṯr Ancient Greek: Σεβέννυτος, Sebennytos; Coptic: ϫⲉⲙⲛⲟⲩϯ Egyptian Arabic: سمنود, Samannūd		380–343 BCE	Thirtieth Dynasty	
Alexandria	Ancient Greek: Ἀλεξάνδρεια, Alexandreia; Egyptian Arabic: الإسكندرية, Aleksandaria	Alexander III of Macedon	332 BCE–641 CE	Macedonian Egypt; Ptolemaic Egypt; Roman Egypt; Palmyrene Empire; Byzantine Empire; Sasanian Empire	
Fustat	Egyptian Arabic: الفُسطاط, al-Fusṭāṭ	Amr ibn al-As	641–750; 905–972	Rashidun Caliphate; Umayyad Caliphate; Abbasid Caliphate; Ikhshidid Dynasty; Fatimid Caliphate	
Al-Askar	Egyptian Arabic: العسكر, al-‘Askar	al-Saffah	750–868	Abbasid Caliphate	
Al-Qata'i	Egyptian Arabic: القَطائِع, al-Qaṭāʾi	Ahmad ibn Tulun	868–905	Tulunid Dynasty	
Cairo	Egyptian Arabic: القاهرة, al-Qāhirah; Coptic: Ϯⲕⲉϣⲣⲱⲙⲓ, Tikešrōmi	al-Mu'izz li-Din Allah	972–present	Fatimid Caliphate; Ayyubid Egypt; Mamluk Egypt; Egypt Eyalet; Khedivate of Egypt (from 1882); Sultanate of Egypt; Kingdom of Egypt; Republic of Egypt; United Arab Republic; Arab Republic of Egypt	
The New Capital	Egyptian Arabic: العاصمة الجديدة, el-ʿĀṣima el-Gedīda	Abdel Fattah el-Sisi	2024–present (de facto seat of government)	Arab Republic of Egypt	

== See also ==
- List of cities and towns in Egypt
- Chronology of ancient Egypt
