= Al-Askari mosque bombing =

al-Askari Mosque bombing could refer to one of two attacks on the al-Askari Mosque in Samarra, Iraq:

- 2006 al-Askari mosque bombing, which severely damaged the mosque and destroyed its golden dome
- 2007 al-Askari mosque bombing, which destroyed the mosque's two remaining ten-story minarets
