= Aşkar =

Human settlement in Azerbaijan

Coordinates: 40°28′N 48°44′E

Aşkar is a village in the municipality of Quşçu in the Shamakhi Rayon of Azerbaijan.
