= Deh-e Asghar, Markazi =

Deh-e Asghar ده اصغر
- Village
- Location within Iran
- Coordinates: 33°48′54″N 49°09′23″E
- Country: Iran
- Province: Markazi
- County: Shazand
- Bakhsh: Sarband
- Rural District: Hendudar

Population (2006)
  - Total: 98
- Time zone: UTC+3:30 (IRST)
  - Summer (DST): UTC+4:30 (IRDT)

Deh-e Asghar (Persian: ده اصغر, also Romanized as Deh-e Aşghar; also known as Deh ‘Asgar, Deh ‘Askar, Deh ‘Askur, Deh-e ‘Asgar, and Deh-e ‘Askar) is a village in Hendudar Rural District, Sarband District, Shazand County, Markazi Province, Iran. At the 2006 census, its population was 98, in 27 families.
