= Askari, Iran =

Askari (Persian: عسكري), also rendered as Asgari, may refer to:

- Askari, Bushehr
- Askari, Kangan, Bushehr Province
- Asgari, Kohgiluyeh and Boyer-Ahmad
