= Asgar Khani =

Asgar Khani عسگرخاني
- Village
- Location within Iran
- Coordinates: 34°26′12″N 45°53′03″E
- Country: Iran
- Province: Kermanshah
- County: Sarpol-e Zahab
- Bakhsh: Central
- Rural District: Howmeh-ye Sarpol

Population (2006)
  - Total: 220
- Time zone: UTC+3:30 (IRST)
  - Summer (DST): UTC+4:30 (IRDT)

Asgar Khani (Persian: عسگرخاني, also Romanized as ‘Asgar Khānī; also known as ‘Asgar Khān and Shahīd Şadūqī) is a village in Howmeh-ye Sarpol Rural District, in the Central District of Sarpol-e Zahab County, Kermanshah Province, Iran. At the 2006 census, its population was 220, in 46 families.
