= Qaleh-ye Askar, Bam =

Village in Kerman, Iran

Qaleh-ye Askar قلعه عسكر
- Village
- Location within Iran
- Coordinates: 29°07′30″N 58°16′39″E
- Country: Iran
- Province: Kerman
- County: Bam
- Bakhsh: Central
- Rural District: Howmeh

Population (2006)
  - Total: 304
- Time zone: UTC+3:30 (IRST)
  - Summer (DST): UTC+4:30 (IRDT)

Qaleh-ye Askar (Persian: قلعه عسكر, also Romanized as Qal‘eh-ye ‘Askar; also known as Asgar, Qal‘eh-ye ‘Asgar, Qal‘eh-ye Deh, and Qal‘eh-ye Deh ‘Asgar) is a village in Howmeh Rural District, in the Central District of Bam County, Kerman Province, Iran. At the 2006 census, its population was 304, in 88 families.
