= List of Coptic Orthodox churches in Egypt =

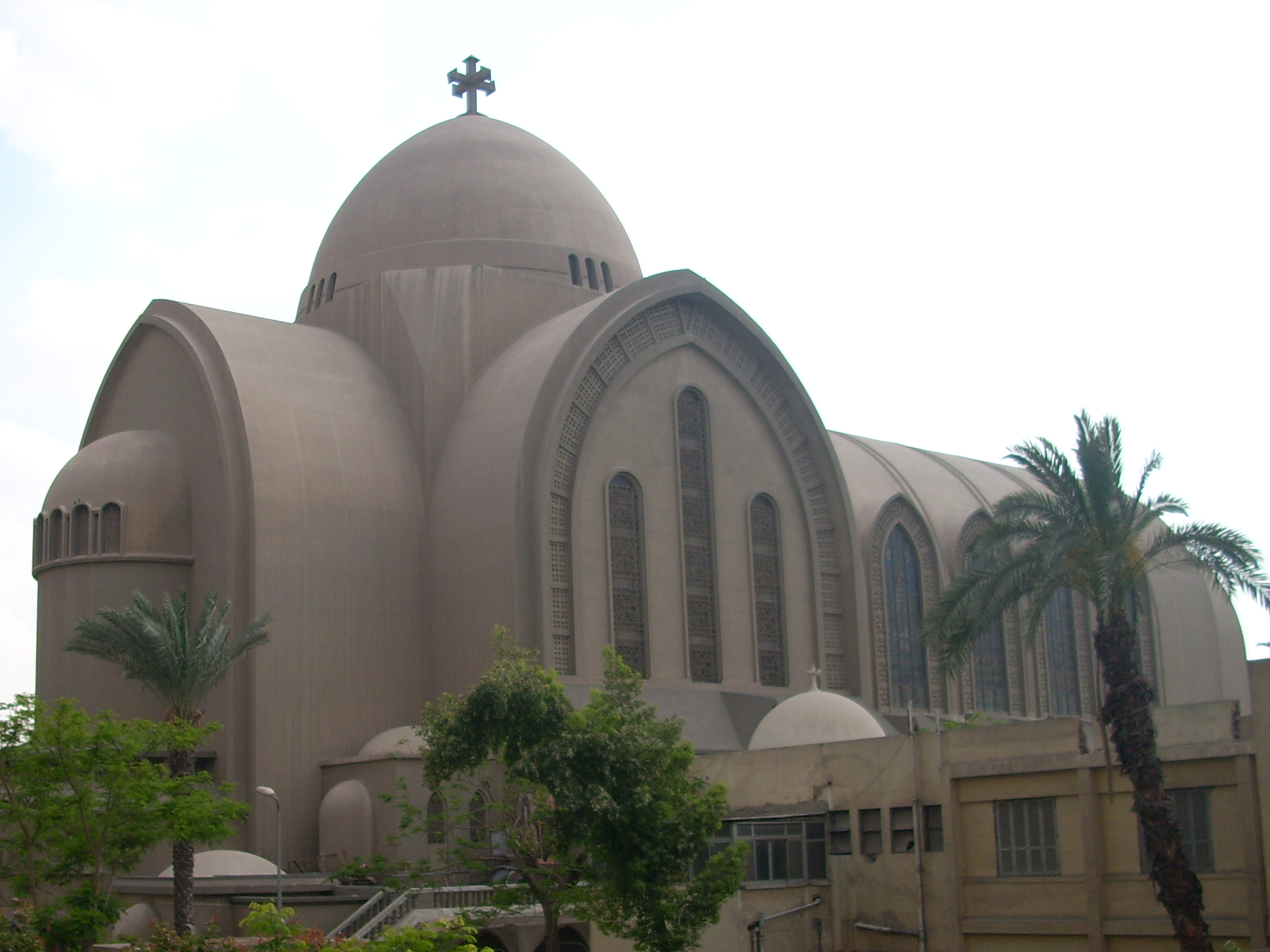
Saint Mark's Coptic Orthodox Cathedral, Cairo, is the second largest cathedral of any denomination in Africa and the Middle East.

The Coptic Orthodox Church of Alexandria is the official name for the largest Christian church in Egypt. The church belongs to the Oriental Orthodox family of churches, since the Council of Chalcedon in AD 451. This church was established by Saint Mark the apostle and evangelist in the 1st century. The head of the church is the pope of Alexandria.

The following is a partial list of Coptic Orthodox churches in Egypt. The count stands at 2,000 churches.

== Diocese of Alexandria ==
- St. Mark Coptic Orthodox Cathedral (Ramleh,
- St. Peter & St. Paul Coptic Orthodox Church (Alexandria)
- St. Samuel & St. Abraam Coptic Orthodox Church (Alexandria)
- The Saints Coptic Orthodox Church (Alexandria)
- St. Damiana Coptic Orthodox Church (Arif Bey)
- St. George Coptic Orthodox Church (Anhar)
- St. George Coptic Orthodox Church (Mattaqi, Bakos)
- St. Cyril I Coptic Orthodox Church (Cleopatra)
- St. Mary Coptic Orthodox Church (Fawakih)
- St. Menas Coptic Orthodox Church (Hurriya, Flemeng)
- St. Mary & Saint John the Beloved Coptic Orthodox Church (Gianaclis)
- St. George Coptic Orthodox Church (Gianaclis)
- St. Mercurius Coptic Orthodox Church (Hadrah)
- St. Mercurius Coptic Orthodox Church (Hilmiya)
- St. Takla Coptic Orthodox Church (Ibrahemeya, Alexandria)
- St. George Coptic Orthodox Church (Maks)
- St. Shenouda Coptic Orthodox Church (Maks)
- St. George Coptic Orthodox Church (Mandara)
- St. Menas Coptic Orthodox Church (Mandara)
- Basilica of Arcadius Coptic Orthodox Church (Mariout)
- St. Menas Coptic Orthodox Church (Mariout)
- St. George & St. Anthony Coptic Orthodox Church (Moharam Bek)
- St. Mary Coptic Orthodox Church (Moharam Bek)
- St. George Coptic Orthodox Church (Abu Qir, Montaza )
- St. Mary Coptic Orthodox Church (Assafra, Montaza)
- St. George Coptic Orthodox Church (Saqf, Montaza)
- St. Mark & St. Peter the Martyr Coptic Orthodox Church (Sidi Bishr, Montaza)
- St. Mary & St. Joseph Coptic Orthodox Church (Semoha)
- Archangel Michael Coptic Orthodox Church (Shagarat al-Durr)
- St. George Coptic Orthodox Church (Canal al-Suways, Shatby)
- St. Theodore Coptic Orthodox Church (Canal al-Suways, Shatby)
- St. George Coptic Orthodox Church (Sporting, Alexandria)
- St. Peter the Martyr Coptic Orthodox Church (Brucheion) (destroyed)
- St. Theodore Coptic Orthodox Church (Brucheion) (destroyed)
- Archangel Raphael Coptic Orthodox Church (Island of Pharos) (destroyed)
- St. Faustus Coptic Orthodox Church (Island of Pharos) (destroyed)
- St. Sophia Coptic Orthodox Church (Island of Pharos) (destroyed)
- Archangel Michael Coptic Orthodox Church (destroyed in the 7th century)
- Archangel Michael Coptic Orthodox Cathedral (destroyed in the 7th century)
- St. Athanasius Coptic Orthodox Church (destroyed in the 7th century)
- St. Cyrus & St. John Coptic Orthodox Church (Abu Qir) (destroyed in the 7th century)
- Virgin Mary Coptic Orthodox Church (destroyed in the 7th century)
- St. John the Baptist Coptic Orthodox Church (Pompey's Pillar) (destroyed in the 10th century)

== Dioceses of Beheira, Damietta, Dakahlia, Gharbia, Monufia, Qalyubia and Sharqia ==
- Archangel Coptic Orthodox Church (Damanhur, Beheira)
- St. George Coptic Orthodox Church (Damanhur, Beheira)
- Holy Virgin Mary Coptic Orthodox Church (Damietta)
- Archangel Coptic Orthodox Church (Mansoura, Dakahlia)
- St. Anthony & St. Paul the Hermit Coptic Orthodox Church (Mansoura, Dakahlia)
- St. Damiana Coptic Orthodox Church (Mansoura, Dakahlia)
- St. George Coptic Orthodox Church (Mansoura, Dakahlia)
- St. Mary Coptic Orthodox Church (Mansoura, Dakahlia)
- St. Mary Coptic Orthodox Church (Daqadus - Mit Ghamr, Dakahlia)
- St. Mary Coptic Orthodox Church (Sinbillawain, Dakahlia)
- Archangel Michael Coptic Orthodox Church (Damira - Talkha, Dakahlia)
- St. George the New Martyr Coptic Orthodox Church (Tabanuha - Talkha, Dakahlia)
- St. Damiana Coptic Orthodox Church (El-Mahalla El-Kubra, Gharbia Governorate)
- St. George Coptic Orthodox Church (El-Mahalla El-Kubra, Gharbia Governorate)
- St. Mary Coptic Orthodox Church (El-Mahalla El-Kubra, Gharbia Governorate)
- St. Anthony Coptic Orthodox Church (El-Mahalla El-Kubra, Gharbia Governorate)
- St. Mina Coptic Orthodox Church (El-Mahalla El-Kubra, Gharbia Governorate)
- Archangel Michael Coptic Orthodox Church (El-Mahalla El-Kubra, Gharbia Governorate)
- St. Cyril Coptic Orthodox Church (El-Mahalla El-Kubra, Gharbia Governorate)
- St. Rebecca Coptic Orthodox Church (Sunbat, Gharbia Governorate)
- St. Abanoub Coptic Orthodox Church (Samanoud, Gharbia Governorate)
- Archangel Michael Coptic Orthodox Church (Tanta, Gharbia Governorate)
- St. George Coptic Orthodox Church (Tanta, Gharbia Governorate)
- St. George Coptic Orthodox Church (Birma- Tanta, Gharbia Governorate)
- St. Mary Coptic Orthodox Church (Ebiar - Tanta, Gharbia Governorate)
- St. Menas Coptic Orthodox Church (Tanta, Gharbia Governorate)
- St. Mercurius Coptic Orthodox Church (Zefta, Gharbia Governorate)
- Archangel Michael Coptic Orthodox Church (Monufia)
- St. George Coptic Orthodox Church (Menouf, Monufia)
- St. George Coptic Orthodox Church (Shibin Al Kawm, Monufia)
- St. Mary Coptic Orthodox Church (Shibin Al Kawm, Monufia)
- St. Sarabamun Coptic Orthodox Church (Shibin Al Kawm, Monufia)
- St. George Coptic Orthodox Church (Tukh Dalaka, Monufia)
- St. Mary Coptic Orthodox Church (Musturud, Qalyubia)
- St. Philotheus Coptic Orthodox Church (Sanhira, Qalyubia)
- Archangel Michael Coptic Orthodox Church (Kafr Yusuf Samri, Sharqia Governorate)
- St. George Coptic Orthodox Church (Minya al-Qamh, Sharqia Governorate)
- Holy Virgin Mary Coptic Orthodox Church (Shentana al-Hagar, Sharqia Governorate)
- Archangel Coptic Orthodox Church (Zagazig, Sharqia Governorate)
- Holy Cross Armenian Orthodox Church (Zagazig, Sharqia Governorate)
- St. Bishoy & St. Peter Coptic Orthodox Church (Zagazig, Sharqia Governorate)
- St. George & St. Takla Haymanot Coptic Orthodox Church (Zagazig, Sharqia Governorate)

== Diocese of Coptic Cairo ==
- Hanging Church (Coptic Cairo)
- Church of the Holy Virgin/Babylon El-Darag (Coptic Cairo)
- St. Menas Coptic Orthodox Church (Coptic Cairo)
- St. Barbara Coptic Orthodox Church (Coptic Cairo)
- St. Mercurius Coptic Orthodox Church (Coptic Cairo)
- Saints Sergius and Bacchus Church (Coptic Cairo)

== Dioceses of Cairo and Giza ==
- St. Mark Coptic Orthodox Cathedral (Abbassia)
- St. Peter & St. Paul Coptic Orthodox Church (Abbassia)
- St. Mary Coptic Orthodox Church (Abbassia)
- St. Mary, St. Bishoy, & St. Rewais Coptic Orthodox Church (Abbassia)
- St. Mark Coptic Orthodox Cathedral (Azbakeya)
- St. Stephen Coptic Orthodox Church (Azbakeya)
- El Markoseia El Kobra Coptic Orthodox Church (Azbakeya)
- St. George Coptic Orthodox Church (al-Qulali, Azbakeya)
- St. Mary Coptic Orthodox Church (al-Wazir Ala al-Din, Azbakeya)
- Archangel Gabriel Coptic Orthodox Church (Harat al-Saqqayin, Abdeen)
- St. Mary & El Malak Coptic Orthodox Church (Ahmad Esmaat)
- St. Mary & St. Abraam Coptic Orthodox Church (Ain Shams)
- St. Mary, St. John & St. Paul Coptic Orthodox Church (Ain Shams)
- St. George Coptic Orthodox Church (Ain Shams)
- St. Mary & Archangel Michael Coptic Orthodox Church (El Abasiery, Ain Shams)
- St. Mary Coptic Orthodox Church (Derias, Ain Shams)
- Archangel Michael Coptic Orthodox Church (al-Khanqah, Ain Shams)
- St. Anthony & St. Paula Coptic Orthodox Church (al-Khanqah, Ain Shams)
- St. Mary Coptic Orthodox Church (al-Khanqah, Ain Shams)
- St. Gawargios & St. Antonious Coptic Orthodox Church (Al Nozha)
- St. Mary Coptic Orthodox Church (Al Nozhaa El Gedida)
- St. George Coptic Orthodox Church (Altebien)
- St. Mary Coptic Orthodox Church (Ard El Golf)
- St. Paula Coptic Orthodox Church (Ard El Golf)
- St. Mary & St. Bishoy Coptic Orthodox Church (Al Geesh Street, al-Ataba)
- St. George Coptic Orthodox Church (Sikkat al-Dahir, Bab al-Sha'riya)
- St. Demiana Coptic Orthodox Church (El Aadaweia, Bulaq)
- El Shaheedeen Abakir & Youhanna Coptic Orthodox Church (Cairo)
- St. Mary & Archangel Michael Coptic Orthodox Church (Cairo)
- St. Mouris & St. Verena Coptic Orthodox Church (Cairo)
- St. Mary Coptic Orthodox Church (Faggala)
- St. George & St. Bashnouna Coptic Orthodox Church (Fom El Khaleeg)
- St. Mina El Agayby Coptic Orthodox Church (Fom El Khaleeg)
- St. Anthony Coptic Orthodox Church (Giza)
- St. Mark Coptic Orthodox Church (Giza)
- St. George Coptic Orthodox Church (Agouza, Giza)
- St. George Coptic Orthodox Church (AlHaram, Giza)
- St. George Coptic Orthodox Church (Atfeeh, Giza)
- St. Mohraeel Coptic Orthodox Church (El-Hawamdya, Giza)
- St. Mary Coptic Orthodox Church (Imbaba, Giza)
- St. Mina Coptic Orthodox Church (Imbaba, Giza)
- St. Cosmas & St. Damian Coptic Orthodox Church (Manyal Shiha, Giza)
- Virgin Mary & Archangel Michael Coptic Orthodox Church (Warraq al-Hadar, Giza)
- St. Mary Coptic Orthodox Church/Haret Elroum (Elghoureya, Cairo)
- Virgin Mary Coptic Orthodox Church (Haret Zuweila)
- St. Mary & St. George Coptic Orthodox Church (Haret Zuweila)
- St. Antonious Coptic Orthodox Church (Helwan)
- St. George Coptic Orthodox Church (Helwan)
- St. Mary Coptic Orthodox Church (Helwan)
- St. Mina Coptic Orthodox Church (Helwan)
- Archangel Michael Coptic Orthodox Church (Helwan)
- St. Barsoum the Naked Coptic Orthodox Church (Masara, Helwan)
- St. Mark Coptic Orthodox Church (15th of May City, Helwan)
- St. George Coptic Orthodox Church (Hadaiek Helwan)
- Archangel Michael Coptic Orthodox Church (El Maasara, Helwan)
- St. Demiana Coptic Orthodox Church (El Maasara, Helwan)
- St. George Coptic Orthodox Church (Al Herafieen)
- St. Mary & Abu Sefein Coptic Orthodox Church (Al Herafieen)
- St. Mary & St. Shenouda Coptic Orthodox Church (Ard El Baraka, Al Herafieen)
- St. Mary & Abu Sefein Coptic Orthodox Church - Ezbet El Haganaa, Al Herafieen)
- St. George Coptic Orthodox Church (al-Alf-Maskin)
- St. Mina Coptic Orthodox Church (al-Alf-Maskin)
- St. George Coptic Orthodox Church (Almaza)
- St. George Coptic Orthodox Church (Heliopolis)
- St. George & St. Abraam Coptic Orthodox Church (Heliopolis)
- St. Mark Coptic Orthodox Church (Cleopatra, Heliopolis)
- Archangel Michael Coptic Orthodox Church (Sheraton, Heliopolis)
- St. Menas Coptic Orthodox Church (Ibrahim Luqa)
- St. Mary Coptic Orthodox Church (Garden City, Kaser El Nile)
- St. George Coptic Orthodox Church (El Kollaly)
- St. Mary Coptic Orthodox Church (El Kosaiareen)
- St. Mary Coptic Orthodox Church (Madinet Nasr, Al Amirya)
- St. Mary & St. Athanasius Coptic Orthodox Church (Madinet Nasr)
- St. George Coptic Orthodox Church (Sa'ud)
- Archangel Raphael Coptic Orthodox Church (Maadi)
- St. Mark Coptic Orthodox Church (Maadi)
- St. Mary Coptic Orthodox Church (Maadi)
- St. George Coptic Orthodox Church (Tura, Maadi)
- St. Mary & St. Mina Coptic Orthodox Church (Madinet El Salam)
- St. Mary & St. Shenouda Coptic Orthodox Church (Madinet El Salam)
- St. Mary Coptic Orthodox Cathedral (Ezbet al-Nakhl)
- St. Mary Coptic Orthodox Church (Ezbet al-Nakhl)
- El Malak & El Romany Coptic Orthodox Church (Al-Matariyyah)
- St. Damiana Coptic Orthodox Church (Al-Matariyyah)
- St. George Coptic Orthodox Church (Madinat al-Nut, Al-Matariyyah)
- St. George Coptic Orthodox Church (Manshiyat al-Tahrir, Al-Matariyyah)
- St. George Coptic Orthodox Church (al-Masakin al-Sha'biya, Al-Matariyyah)
- St. Mary Coptic Orthodox Church (Al-Matariyyah)
- St. Mary Coptic Orthodox Church (al Muq'ad, Al-Matariyyah)
- St. Mary Coptic Orthodox Church (Midan al-Tahrir, Al-Matariyyah)
- St. Mark Coptic Orthodox Church (Zabbaleen, Mokattam)
- St. Paul Coptic Orthodox Church (Zabbaleen, Mokattam)
- St. Simon the Tanner Coptic Orthodox Church (Zabbaleen, Mokattam)
- St. Mark Coptic Orthodox Church (New Cairo)
- St. George Coptic Orthodox Church (New Cairo)
- St. Gawargios and St. Anthony Coptic Orthodox Church (New Cairo)
- St. Mary Coptic Orthodox Church (El Nour City))
- St. Bahnam Coptic Orthodox Church (Old Cairo)
- St. Cyrus & St. John Coptic Orthodox Church (Old Cairo)
- St. George Coptic Orthodox Church (Old Cairo)
- St. Mary Coptic Orthodox Church (Kasriet El-Rihan, Old Cairo)
- St. Mercurius Coptic Orthodox Church (Old Cairo)
- St. Michael al-Qibli Coptic Orthodox Church (Old Cairo)
- St. Shenouda Coptic Orthodox Church (Old Cairo)
- St. Theodore the Oriental Coptic Orthodox Church (Old Cairo)
- St. Damiana Coptic Orthodox Church (Ard Baba Dublu)
- St. Mercurius & St. Damiana Coptic Orthodox Church (Ard Rif)
- Holy Virgin Mary & Angel Coptic Orthodox Church (Ard Sharif)
- St. George Coptic Orthodox Church (Khumarawayh)
- St. George Coptic Orthodox Church (Qalyubia)
- St. Mark Coptic Orthodox Church (Minyat al-Shiriq)
- St. Barbara Coptic Orthodox Church (El-Sharabeya)
- St. Mary Coptic Orthodox Church (Ard Alshereka, El-Sharabeya)
- St. George & Anba Sarabamon Coptic Orthodox Church (Ezbet El Ward, El-Sharabeya)
- St. Mary Coptic Orthodox Church (al-Karki)
- St. Antonios Coptic Orthodox Church (Al-Khargi, Shubra)
- St. Athanasius Coptic Orthodox Church (Shubra)
- Archangel Michael & St. Shenouda Coptic Orthodox Church (Ayadbek, Shubra)
- St. Mary Coptic Orthodox Church (Ayadbek, Shubra)
- St. George Coptic Orthodox Church (Abu El Farag, Shubra)
- St. George Coptic Orthodox Church (Abu Takeia, Hadaiek Shubra)
- St. Demiana Coptic Orthodox Church (Baba Doblu, Shubra)
- St. Mary & El Malak Coptic Orthodox Church (Baba Doblu, Shubra)
- St. Abraam Coptic Orthodox Church (Bet El Mahaba, Shubra)
- St. Mark Coptic Orthodox Church]] (Shubra)
- St. Mary Coptic Orthodox Church (Rod El Farag, Shubra)
- St. George Coptic Orthodox Church (Gazrat Badran)
- Archangel Michael Coptic Orthodox Church (Ghali)
- St. George Coptic Orthodox Church (El Gyoshy, Shubra)
- St. George Coptic Orthodox Church (El Gyoshy, Shubra)
- St. George Coptic Orthodox Church (El Khamrawia, Shubra)
- St. George Coptic Orthodox Church (Khumarawayh, Shubra)
- St. Mary Coptic Orthodox Church (El Hafezeia, Shubra)
- St. George Coptic Orthodox Church (El Sahel, Shubra)
- Abu Sefein & St. Demiana Coptic Orthodox Church (El Teraa El Bolakya, Shubra)
- St. Mina Coptic Orthodox Church (El Teraa El Bolakya, Shubra)
- St. Mary Coptic Orthodox Church (El Wegoh, Shubra)
- St. George Coptic Orthodox Church (Gezerat Padran, Shubra)
- St. Mary Coptic Orthodox Church (Maahad El Banat, Shubra)
- St. Mary Coptic Orthodox Church (Mahmasha, Shubra)
- St. Mary Coptic Orthodox Church (Massarra, Shubra)
- Archangel Michael Coptic Orthodox Church (Tusun, Shubra)
- St. Mary Coptic Orthodox Church (Wadihofe)
- St. Mary Coptic Orthodox Church (Wasat El Balaad)
- St. Demiana Coptic Orthodox Church (Al Taweel Street, El Waiely)
- St. Mina Coptic Orthodox Church (El Ahlaam City, El Waiely)
- St. John the Baptist Coptic Orthodox Church (al-Gabal al Ahmar)
- Archangel Michael Coptic Orthodox Church (Hadayiq al-Qubba)
- St. Abu Sefein Coptic Orthodox Church (Hadayiq al-Qubba)
- St. Mary Coptic Orthodox Church (Hadayiq al-Qubba)
- St. George Coptic Orthodox Church (Hamamat al-Qubba)
- St. Mary Coptic Orthodox Church (Izbat Mansur)
- St. Mercurius Coptic Orthodox Church (Izbat Mansur)
- St. Mary Coptic Orthodox Church (Izbat al-Qusayyarin)
- St. George Coptic Orthodox Church (Mansheat El Sader, Al-Wayli)
- Archangel Michael Coptic Orthodox Church (El Zaher)
- St. George Coptic Orthodox Church (El Mansy, El Zaher)
- St. Mary Coptic Orthodox Church (Zamalek)
- St. George Coptic Orthodox Church (Ard El Genena, El Zawia El Hamraa)
- Virgin Mary Coptic Orthodox Church (Zeitoun)
- Virgin Mary Coptic Orthodox Cathedral (Zeitoun)
- El Amir Tadros El Shatby Coptic Orthodox Church (Zeitoun)
- Mari Youhanna El Habib Coptic Orthodox Church (Helmeiet, Zeitoun)
- St. Timothy Coptic Orthodox Church (Helmeiet, Zeitoun)

== Diocese of Fayyum ==
- Archangel Coptic Orthodox Church (Fayyum)
- Holy Virgin Mary Coptic Orthodox Church (Fayyum)
- St. Damiana Coptic Orthodox Church (Fayyum)
- St. George Coptic Orthodox Church (Fayyum)
- St. Joseph Coptic Orthodox Church (Fayyum)
- St. Mina Coptic Orthodox Church (Fayyum)
- St. Mary, St. Markorious, & St. Abraam Coptic Orthodox Church (Fayyum)
- St. Mercurius Coptic Orthodox Church (Fayyum)
- St. Theodore Coptic Orthodox Church (Fayyum)

== Diocese of South Sinai ==
- St. George & St. Mina Coptic Orthodox Church (Ras Sudar)
- Moses The Prophet & St. Mark Coptic Orthodox Church (El-Tor)
- St. Mary & St. Mina Coptic Orthodox Church (Sharm el-Sheikh)
- El Sama-eyeen Coptic Orthodox Church (Hay Al Noor, Sharm el-Sheikh)
- St. John The Beloved & The Baptist Coptic Orthodox Church

== Diocese of Minya and al- Ashmunein ==
- Holy Virgin Coptic Orthodox Mortuary Chapel (Antinoöpolis)
- St. John Coptic Orthodox Cave Church (Antinoöpolis)
- St. Theodore Coptic Orthodox Church (El-Bahnasa)
- The Hermitages Coptic Orthodox Church (Deir el-Bersha)
- Tombs of al-Barsha (Dair Abu Fam) Coptic Orthodox Church (Deir el-Bersha)
- The Church in the Tomb of Urarna (Deir el-Bersha)
- St. Colluthus (Aba Klog) Coptic Orthodox Church (al-Fant)
- Holy Virgin Coptic Orthodox Church (Gabal al-Tayr)
- The Cave Church of St. John the Short (Deir Abu Hinnis)
- Holy Virgin Coptic Orthodox Church (Manahra)
- Coptic Orthodox Church of the Holy Apostles (Minya)
- St. George Coptic Orthodox Church (Minya)
- St. Mark Coptic Orthodox Cathedral (Minya)
- St. Moses the Black Coptic Orthodox Church (Minya)
- St. Iskhirun Coptic Orthodox Church (Bayahu, Samalut)
- St. Theodore Coptic Orthodox Church (Deir el- Sanquriya)
- St. Hor Coptic Orthodox Church (Sawada)
- Virgin Mary & Anba Abraam Coptic Orthodox Church (Delga, Deir Mawas) (destroyed in 2013)
- St. Mina Coptic Orthodox Church (Minya) (destroyed in 2013)

== Diocese of Asyut ==
- St. Phoebammon (Abi Fam) Coptic Orthodox Church (Abnub)
- Archangel Michael Coptic Orthodox Cathedral (Asyut)
- St. Mark Coptic Orthodox Church (Asyut)
- St. Makar Coptic Orthodox Church (Asyut)
- Holy Virgin Mary Coptic Orthodox Church ( El Badari)
- St. Shenouda Coptic Orthodox Church (El Badari)
- St. George Coptic Orthodox Church (Asyut) (Torched in 2013, Rebuilt)
- St. Apater Coptic Orthodox Church (Asyut)
- St. George Coptic Orthodox Church (Beni Mur)
- Holy Virgin Mary & St. Theodore Coptic Orthodox Church (Dair Rifa)
- Archangel Coptic Orthodox Church (Durunka)
- Holy Virgin Mary Coptic Orthodox Church (Durunka)
- St. Mercurius Coptic Orthodox Church (Meir)
- St. Mercurius Coptic Orthodox Church (Shutb)
- St. Therapon (Abu Tarbu) Coptic Orthodox Church (al-Zawya)
- Coptic Orthodox Churches (Shutb) (destroyed)

== Diocese of Sohag ==
- Holy Virgin Mary Coptic Orthodox Church (Sohag)
- St. Abraam Coptic Orthodox Church (Sohag)
- St. Bisada Coptic Orthodox Church (Sohag)
- St. Damiana Coptic Orthodox Church (Sohag)
- Abouna Yassa Coptic Orthodox Church ( Tima)
- St. George Coptic Orthodox Church (Sohag)
- St. Mark Coptic Orthodox Church (Sohag)

== Diocese of Qena ==
- St. Menas Coptic Orthodox Church (Hiwon)
- St. Mary Coptic Orthodox Church (Qena)
- St. Mary Coptic Orthodox Cathedral (Nag Hammadi)
- St. Mercurius Coptic Orthodox Church (Qamula)
- Coptic Orthodox Basilica (Dendera) (destroyed)
- St. George Coptic Orthodox Church (Qamula, Naqada)
- St. John Coptic Orthodox Church (Qamula, Naqada)
- St. Mary Coptic Orthodox Church (Qamula, Naqada)
- St. Shenute Coptic Orthodox Church (Qamula, Naqada)
- St. Theodore Coptic Orthodox Church (Qamula, Naqada)
- St. Victor Coptic Orthodox Church (Qamula, Naqada)

== Diocese of Luxor ==
- St. Abshai al-Qabrin Coptic Orthodox Church in the Temple of Tud (Temple of Tud)
- Coptic Orthodox Church in the Temple of Karnak (destroyed)
- Coptic Orthodox Church in the Temple of Luxor (destroyed)
- Coptic Orthodox Church in the Temple of Madamut (destroyed)
- Martyr Gorge Coptic Orthodox Church (Port Fouad)
- St. Mary & St. Abasikhiron Coptic Orthodox Church
- St. Misael Coptic Orthodox Church
- Archangel Michael's Coptic Orthodox Cathedral (Aswan)
- St. Mercurius Coptic Orthodox Church (Ismaillia)
- St. George Coptic Orthodox Church (Al Qantara El Garbeya, Ismaillia)
- St. Anthony Coptic Orthodox Church (Dair al-Maymun)
- St. Mercurius Coptic Orthodox Church (Dair al-Maymun)
- Holy Virgin Coptic Orthodox Cathedral (Beni Suef)
- St. George Coptic Orthodox Church (Biba, Beni Suef)
- St. Mark Coptic Orthodox Church (Port Said)
- Coptic Orthodox Church of the Holy Apostles (Red Sea)
- St. Anthony Coptic Orthodox Church (Qimn al-Arus) (destroyed)

== Gallery ==
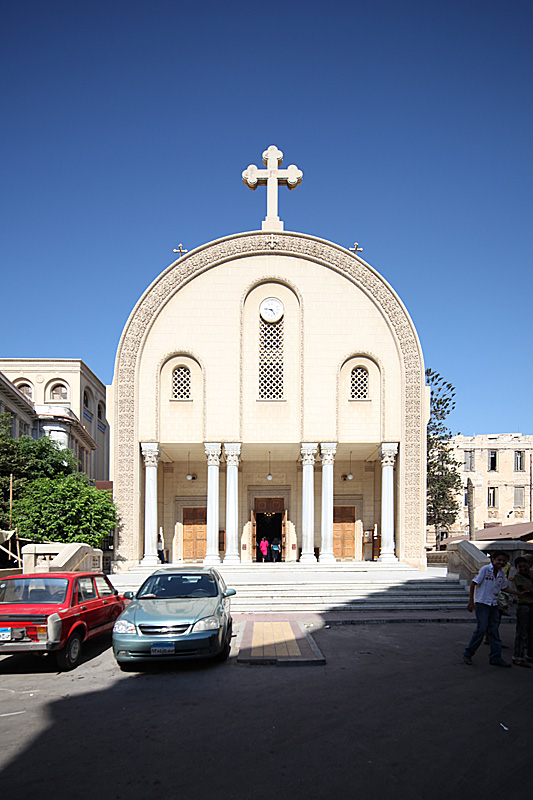
St. Mark's Coptic Orthodox Cathedral (Ramleh, Alexandria)

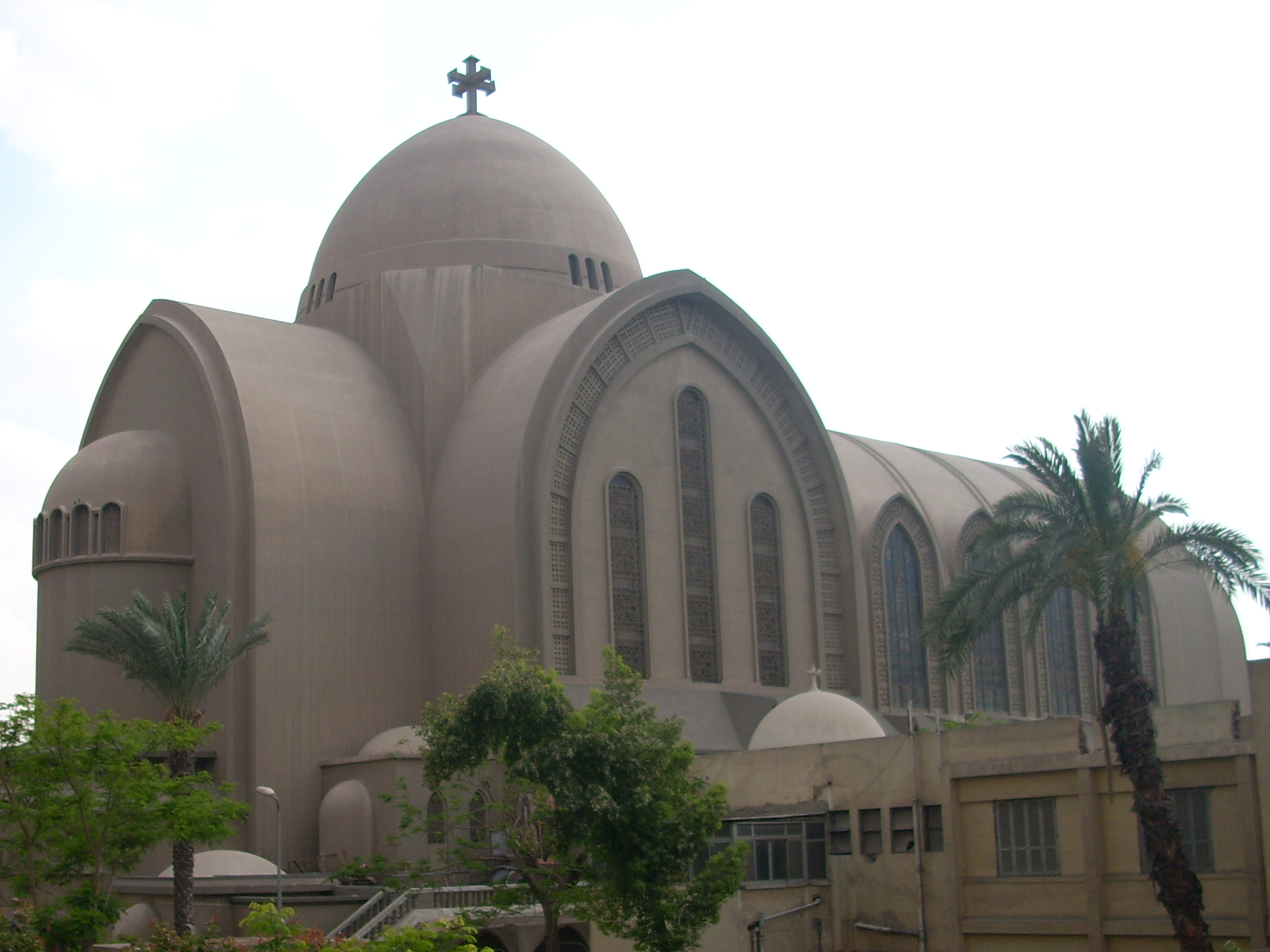
Saint Mark's Coptic Orthodox Cathedral (Abbassia, Cairo)

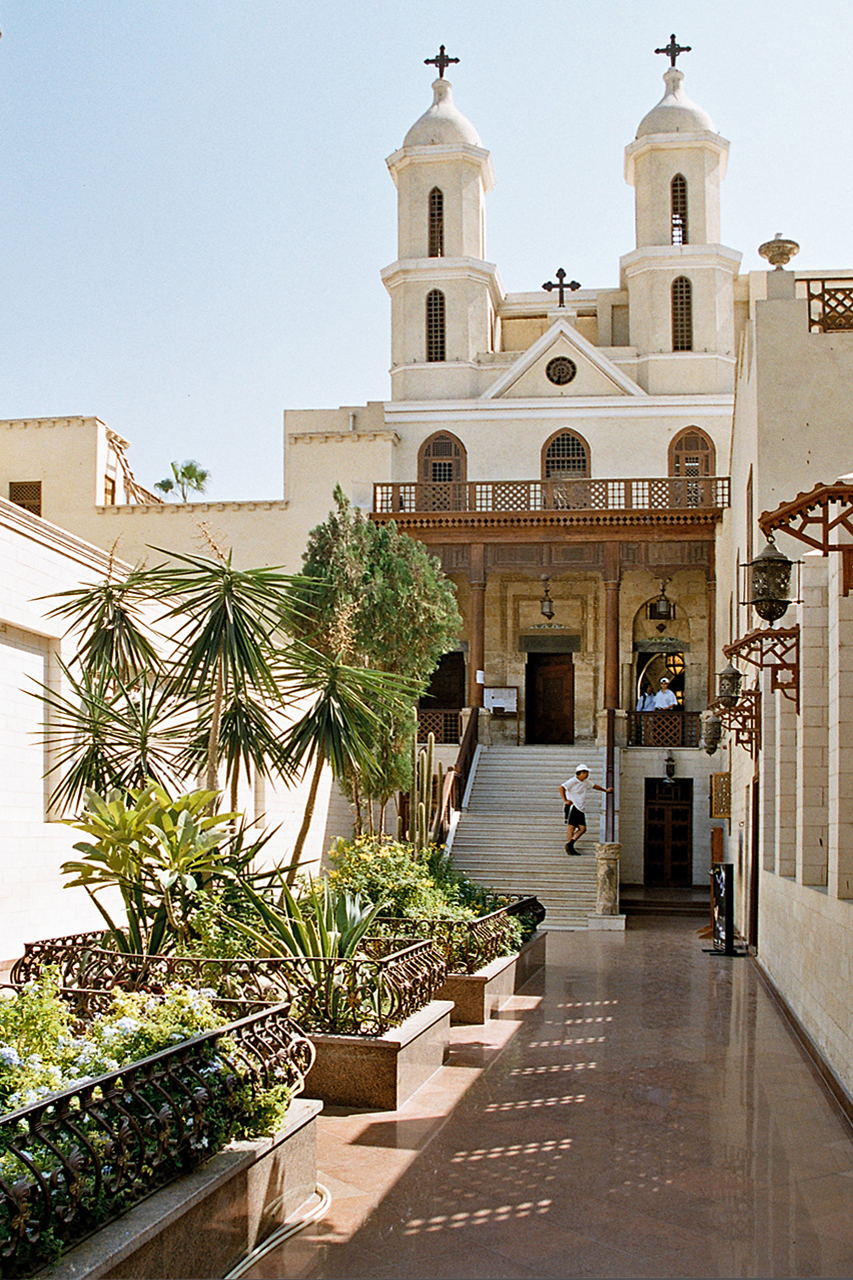
The Hanging Church (Coptic Cairo)

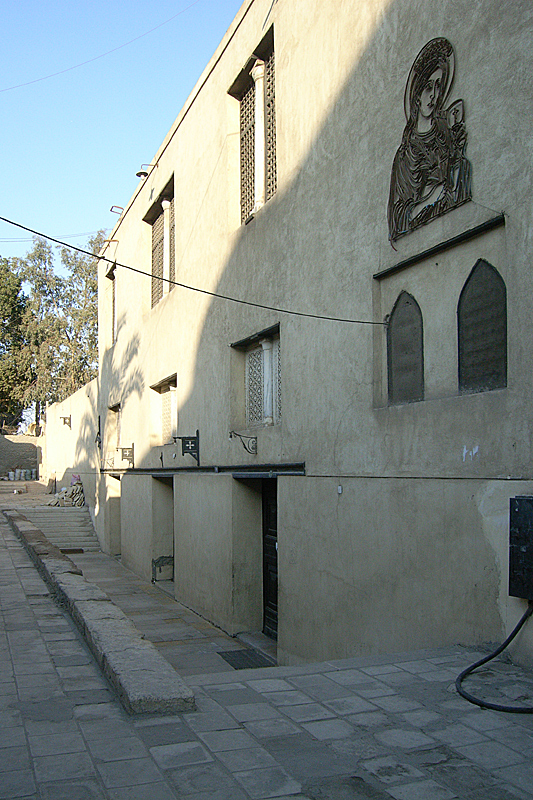
St. Barbara Coptic Orthodox Church (Coptic Cairo)

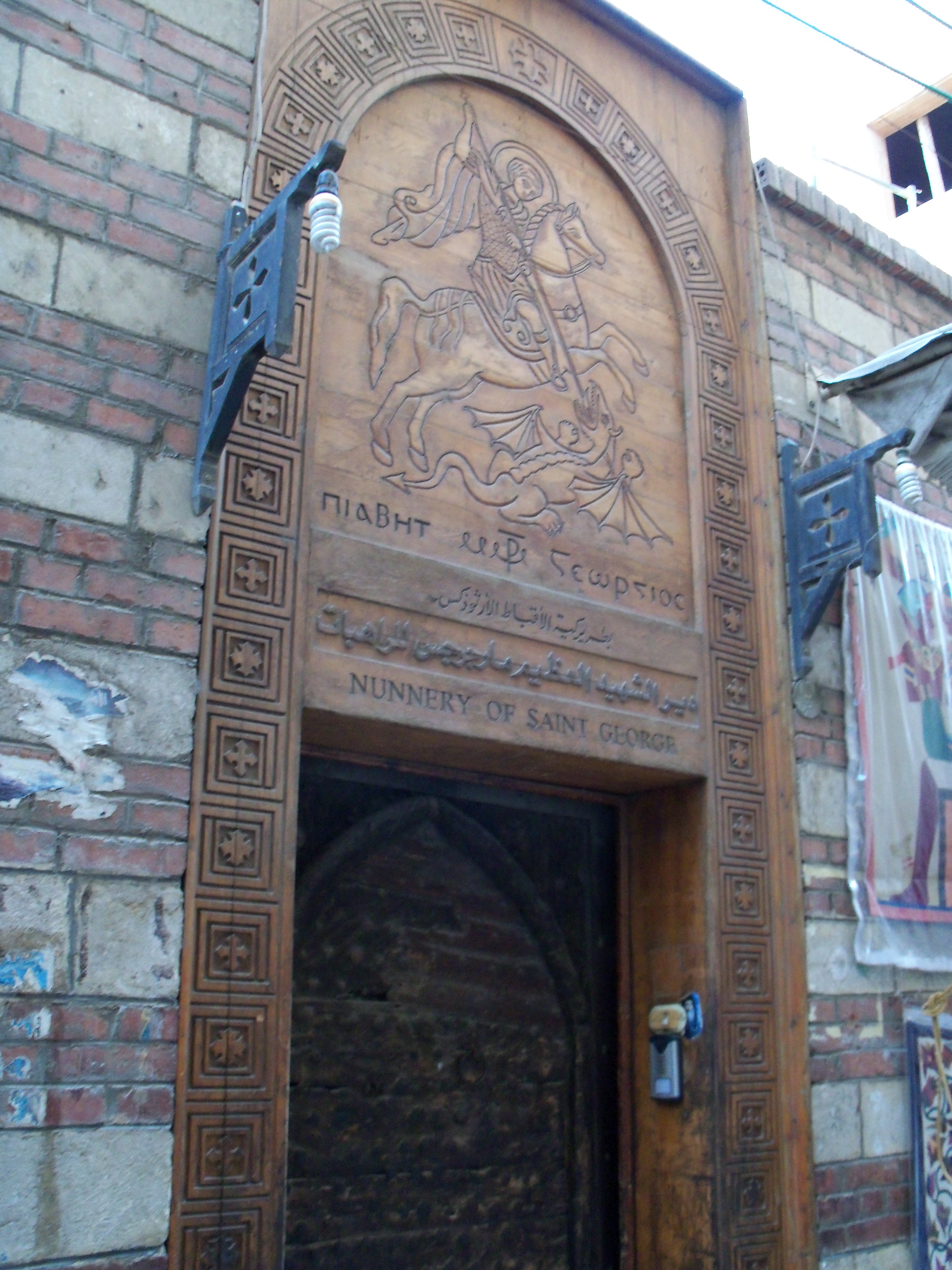
St. George Coptic Orthodox Nunnery (Coptic Cairo)

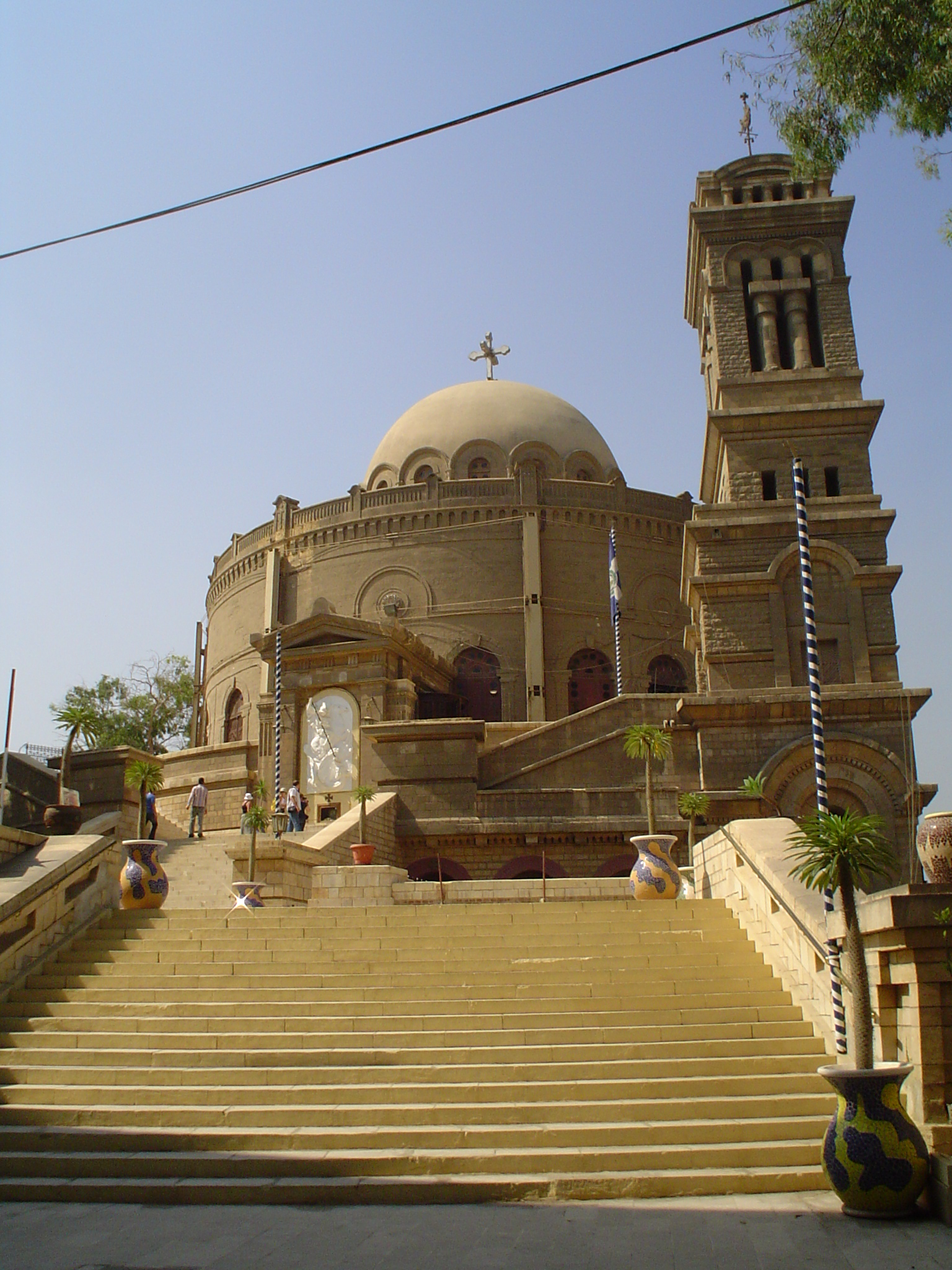
St. George Greek Orthodox Church (Coptic Cairo)

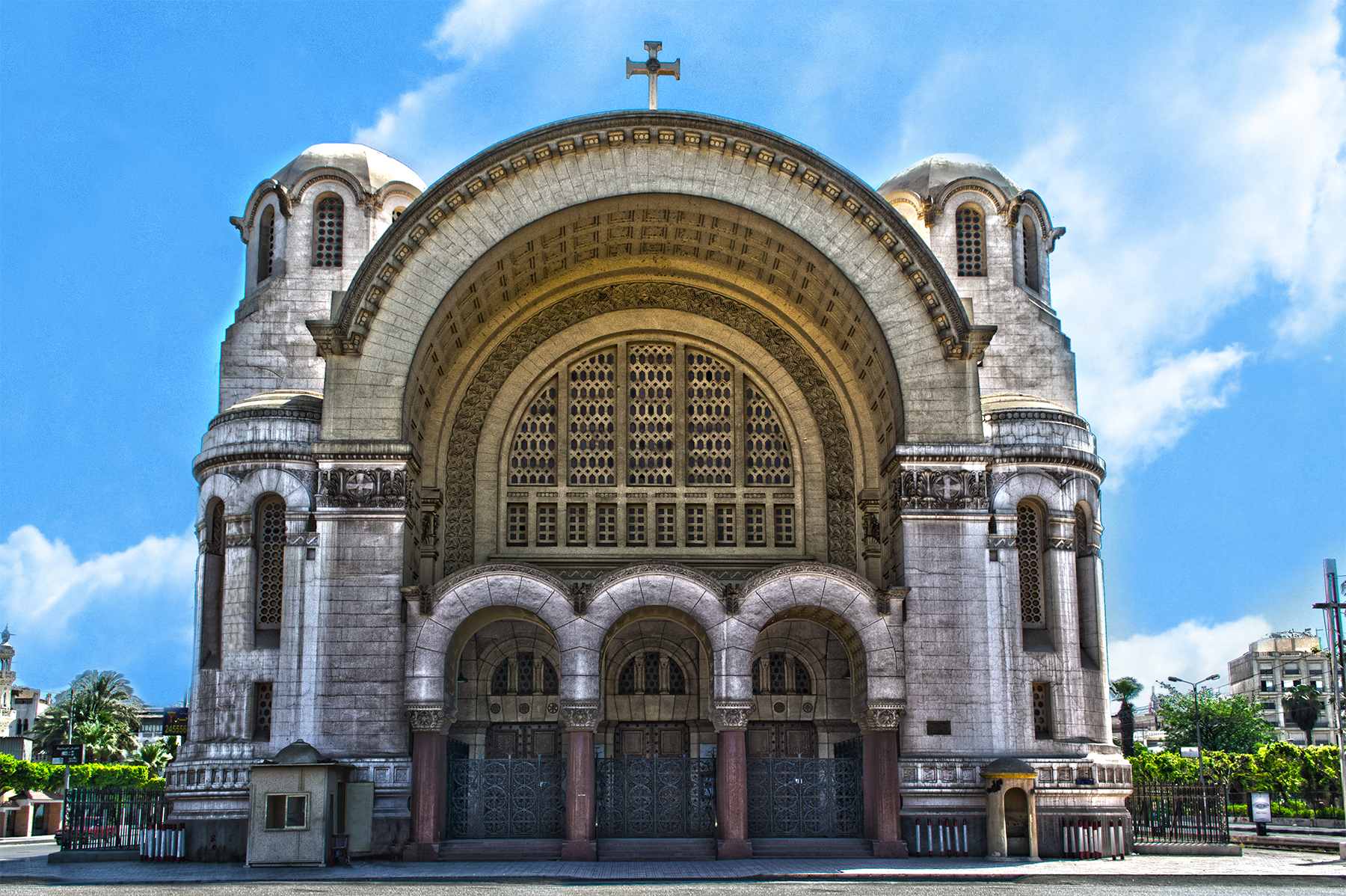
St. Mark Coptic Orthodox Church (Heliopolis)

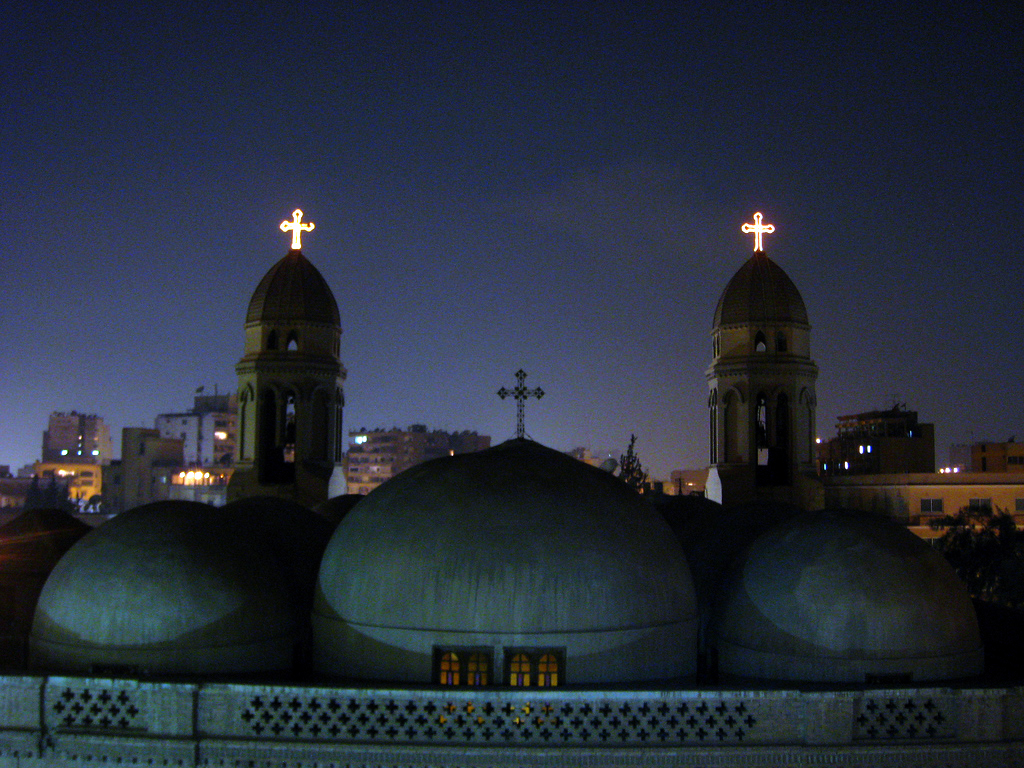
St. Mark Coptic Orthodox Church (Cleopatra, Heliopolis)

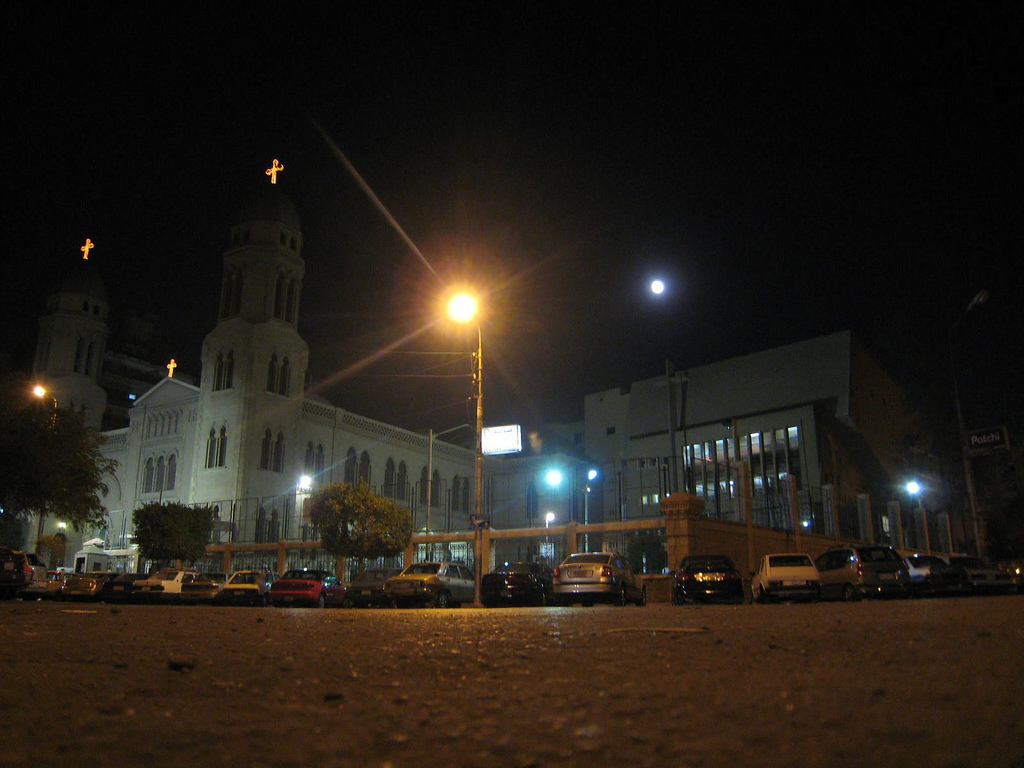
St. Mark Coptic Orthodox Church (Cairo)

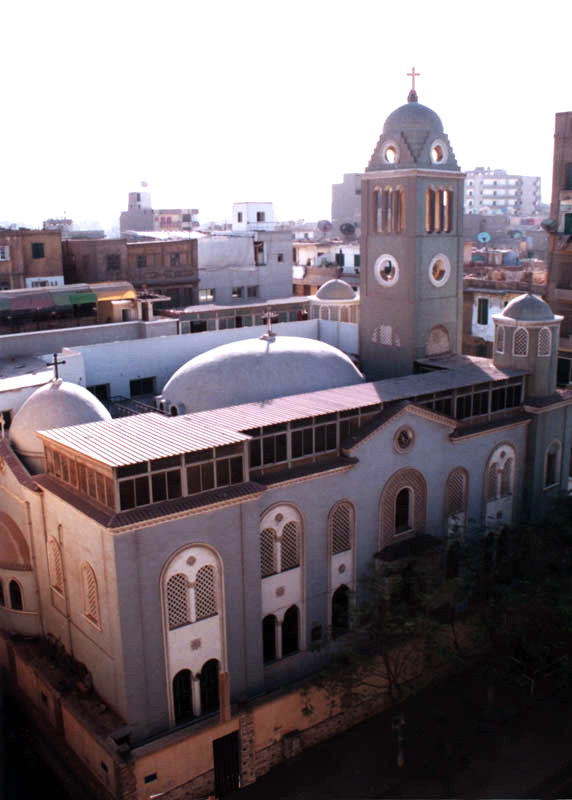
St. Mary Coptic Orthodox Church (Massarra, Shubra)

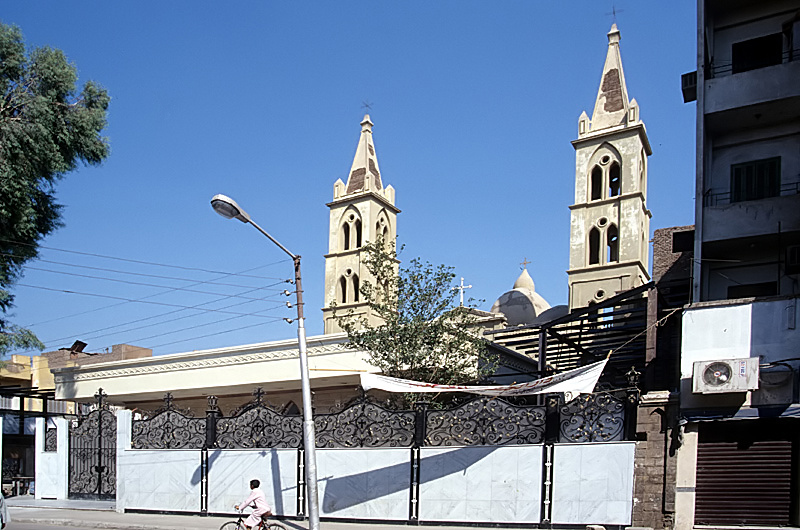
St. Mary Coptic Orthodox Church (Luxor)

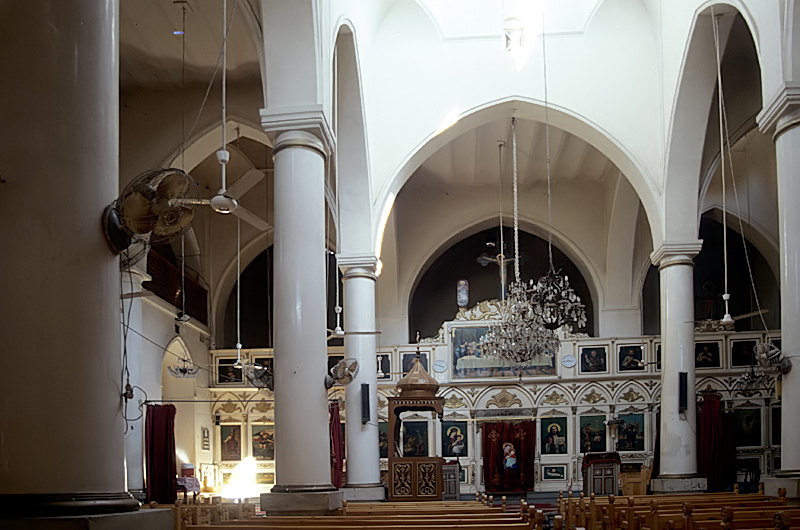
St. Mary Coptic Orthodox Church (Luxor)

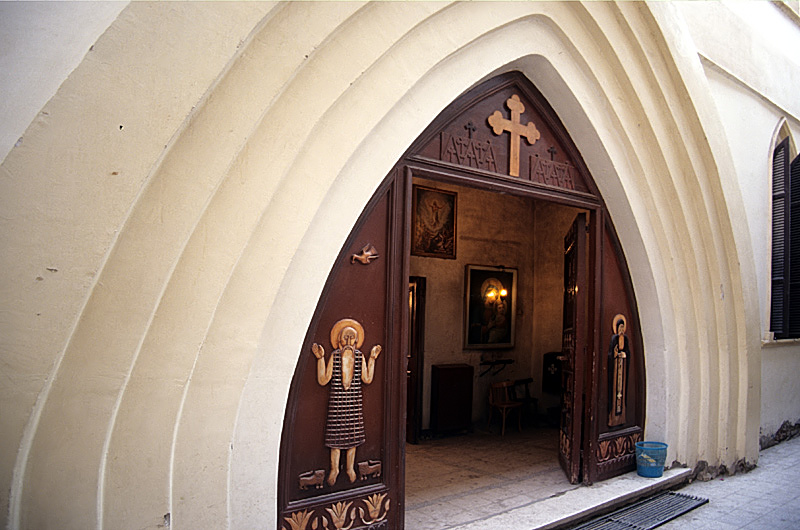
St. Anthony Coptic Orthodox Church (Luxor)

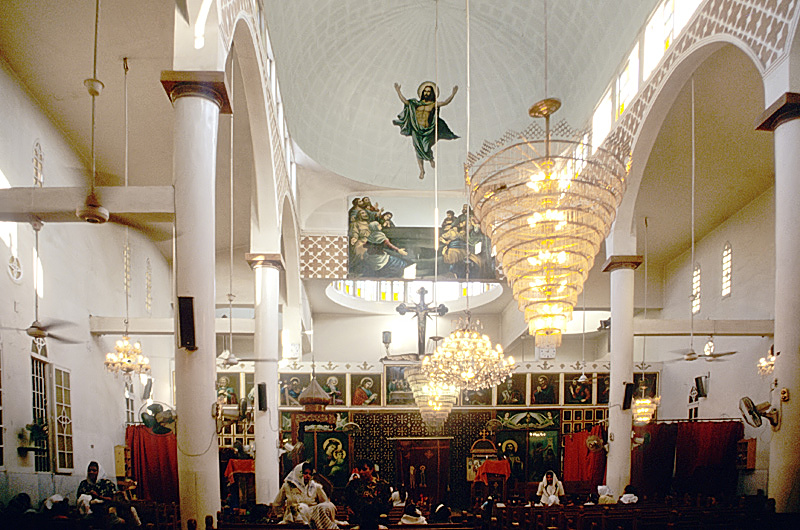
St. Anthony Coptic Orthodox Church (Luxor)

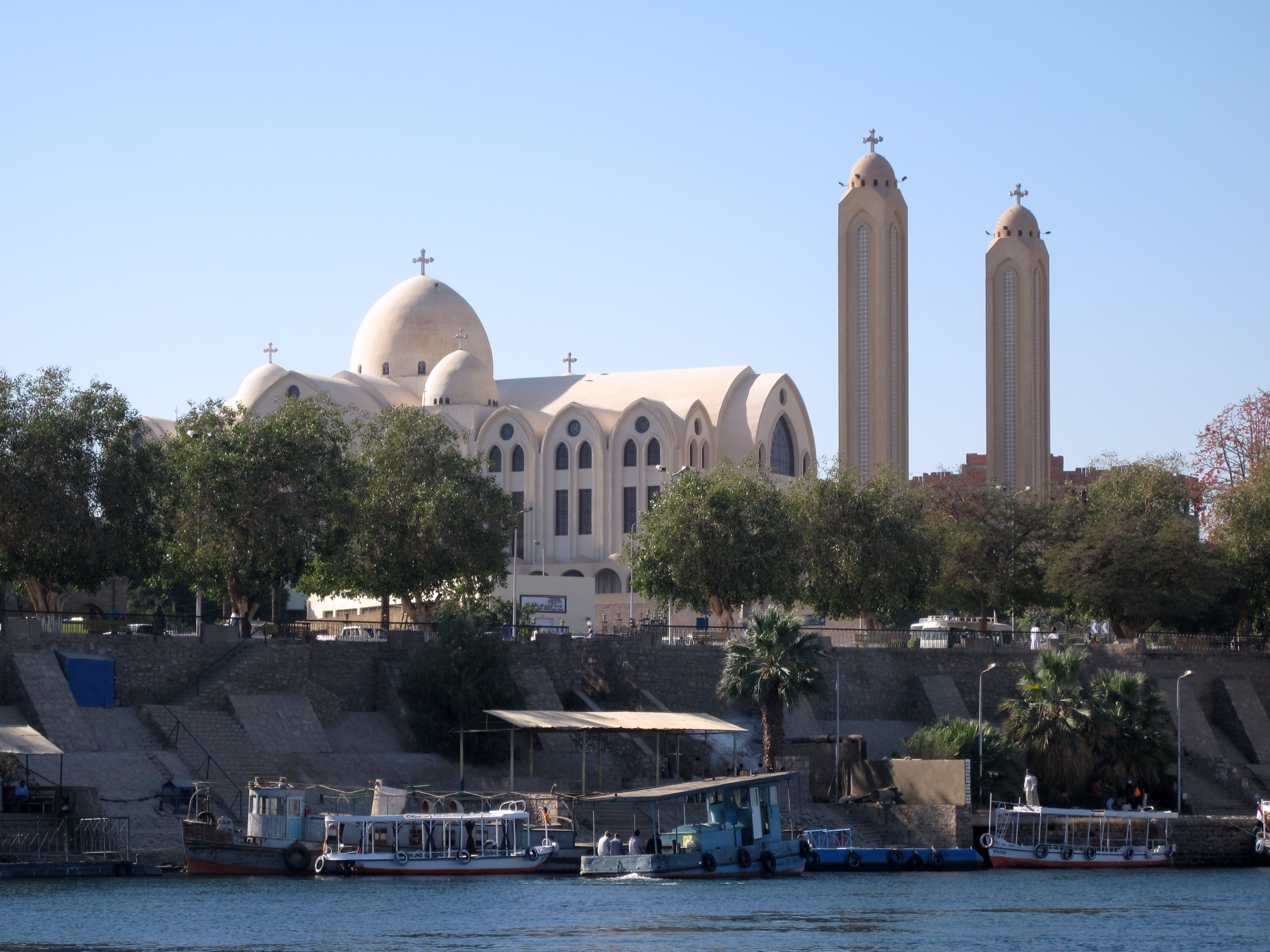
Archangel Michael's Coptic Orthodox Cathedral (Aswan)

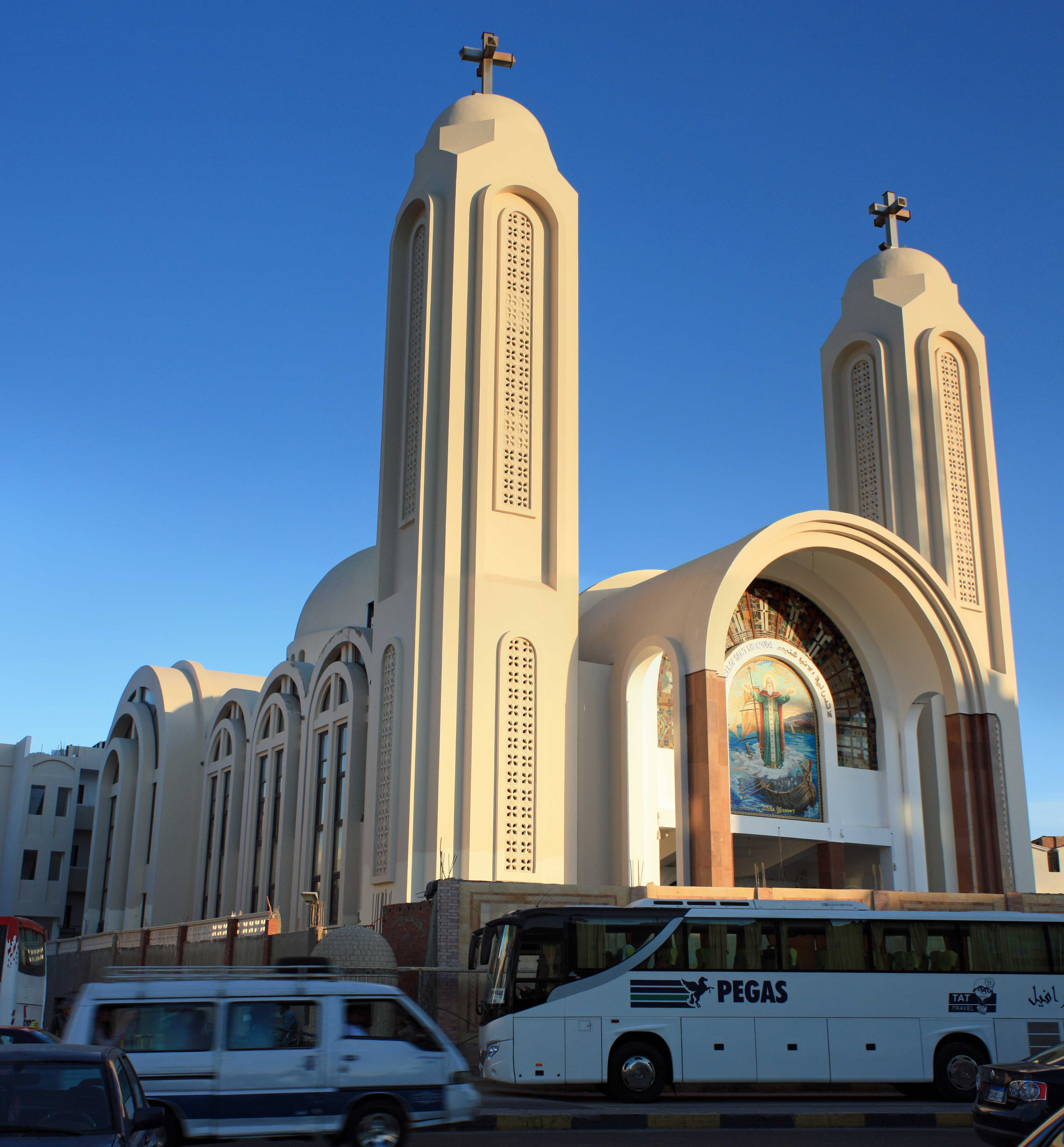
St. Shenouda Coptic Orthodox Church (Hurghada)

== See also ==
- List of Coptic monasteries
- Lists of Coptic church buildings
- List of Coptic Orthodox churches in Australia
- List of Coptic Orthodox Churches in Canada
- List of Coptic Orthodox Churches in the United States
- Coptic Orthodox Church in North America
- Coptic Orthodox Church in the United States
- Coptic Orthodox Church in Canada
- Coptic Orthodox Church in Australia
- Coptic Orthodox Church in Mexico
- Coptic Orthodox Church in South America
- Coptic Orthodox Church in Asia
- Coptic Orthodox Archdiocese of Jerusalem
- Coptic Orthodox Church in Malaysia
- Coptic Orthodox Church in Africa
- Coptic Orthodox Church in Europe
- Coptic Orthodox Church in Britain and Ireland
- Coptic Orthodox Church in Wales
- French Coptic Orthodox Church
