= Coptic architecture =

Architecture of the Copts in Egypt

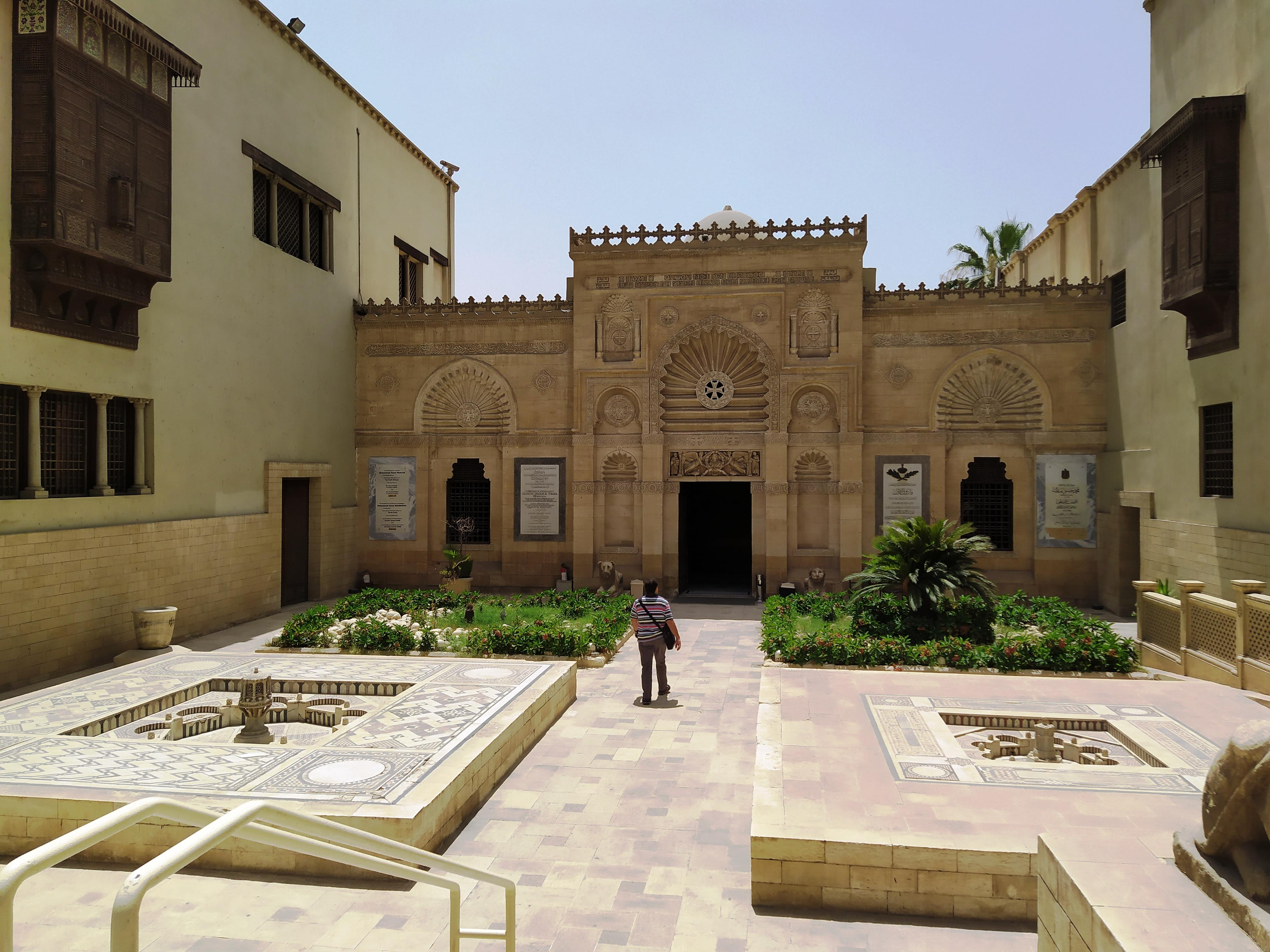
Coptic Museum in Cairo (its façade was made to resemble the façade of the 12th century Al-Aqmar Mosque)

Coptic architecture is the architecture of the Coptic Christians, who form the majority of Christians in Egypt.

Coptic churches range from great cathedrals such as Saint Mark's Coptic Orthodox Cathedral to the smallest churches in rural villages. Many ancient monasteries like the Monastery of Saint Anthony in the Eastern Desert also exist. Ancient Churches like the Hanging Church in Coptic Cairo carry important historical value to the Coptic Orthodox Church and the Copts in general.

== Origin and influence ==
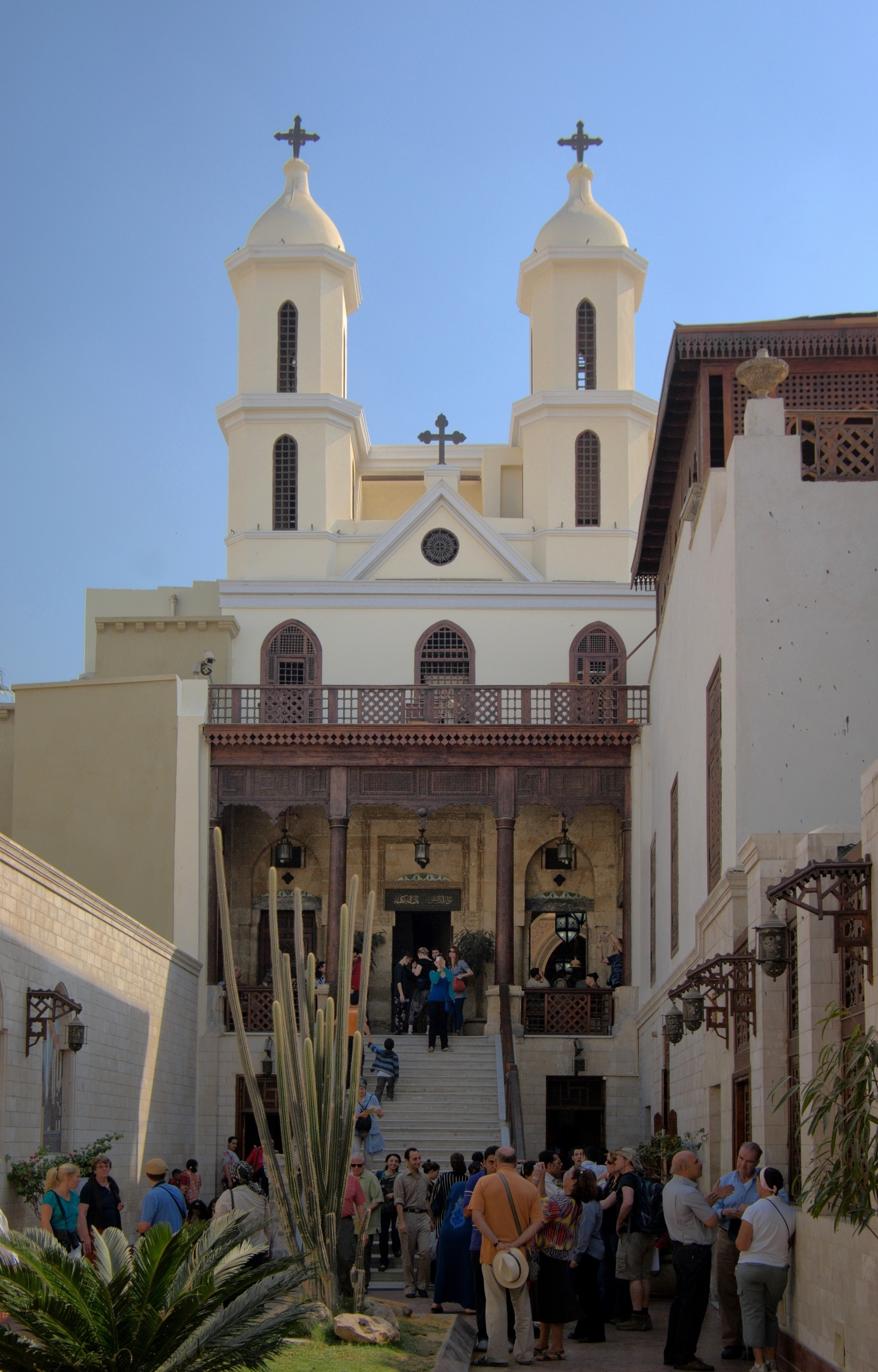
The Hanging Church is Cairo's most famous Coptic church, first built in the 3rd or 4th century

Some authorities trace the origins of Coptic architecture to Ancient Egyptian architecture, seeing a similarity between the plan of ancient Egyptian temples, progressing from an outer courtyard to a hidden inner sanctuary to that of Coptic churches, with an outer narthex or porch, and (in later buildings) a sanctuary hidden behind an iconostasis. Others see the earliest Coptic churches as progressing, like those of the Byzantine and Roman churches, from the Greco-Roman basilica. The ruins of the cathedral at Hermopolis Magna (c.430–40) are the significant survival of the single brief period when the Coptic Orthodox Church represented the official religion of the state in Egypt.

Thus, from its early beginnings, Coptic architecture fused indigenous Egyptian building traditions and materials with Greco-Roman and Christian Byzantine styles. The fertile styles of neighbouring Christian Syria had a greatly increased influence after the 6th century, including the use of stone tympani.

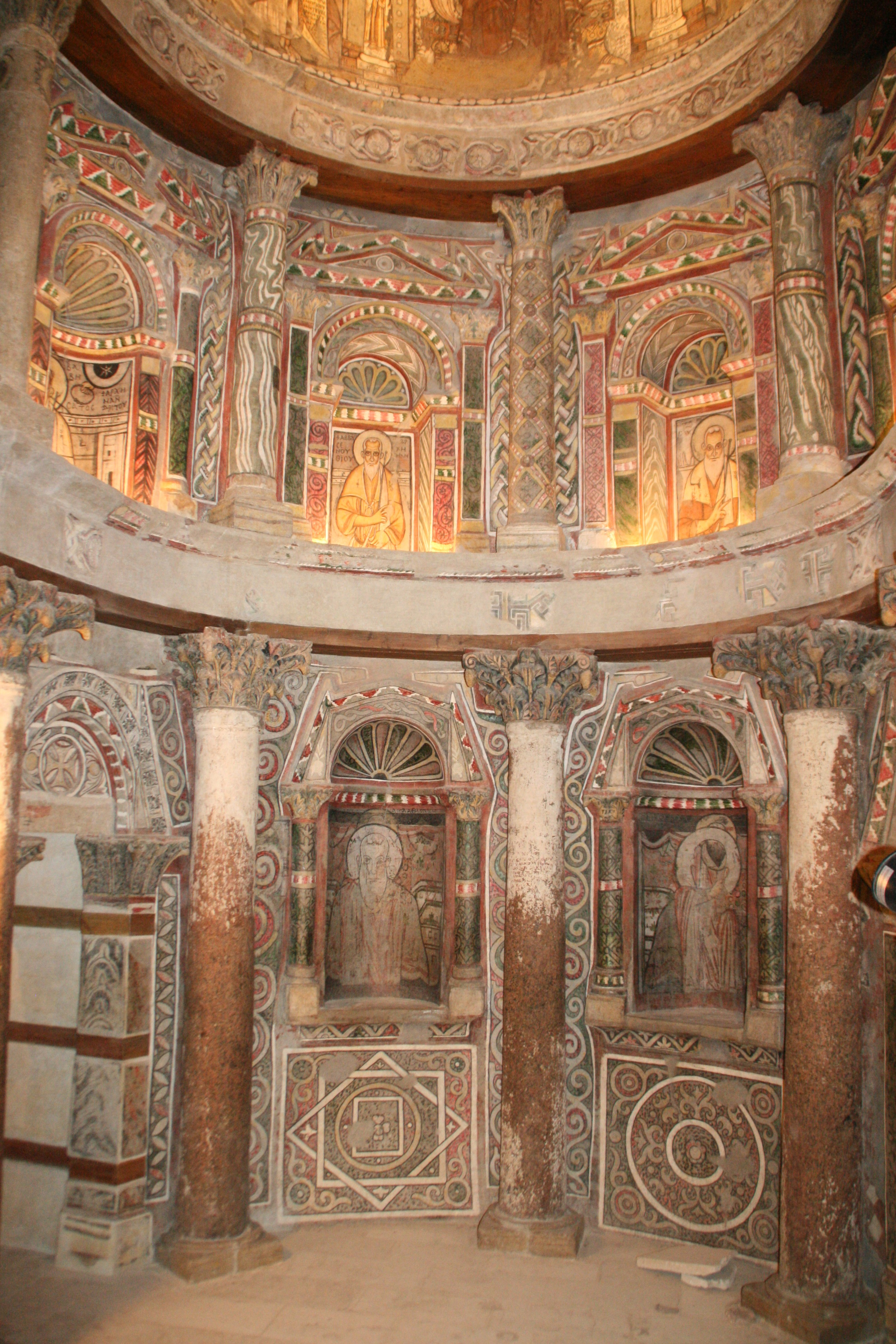
Conserved ancient Red Monastery sanctuary interior

Over a period of two thousand years, Coptic architecture incorporated native Egyptian, Greco-Roman, Byzantine and Western European styles.

After the Muslim conquest of Egypt, the influence of Coptic art and architecture on Egyptian Islamic architecture and the incorporation of some Coptic features in Islamic building in Egypt can be seen. This can be explained by the fact that the early Muslim rulers of Egypt, much like the Ptolemaic and Byzantine rulers before them, recruited native Egyptians to undertake the building labor. In later centuries, Coptic art and architecture also incorporated motifs inspired by Islamic styles. In particular, very early examples of the pointed arch appear in Coptic churches from the 4th century onwards, and this became a notable feature of Islamic architecture, and may have spread from there to European Gothic architecture, though this whole area remains controversial among architectural historians, with many now seeing the origins among the Assyrians, from whom it spread to Persia, where it joined the Islamic style.

== Features ==
The Coptic Church broke from the other Eastern Orthodox Churches in 451 AD. After that date, the Copts, then a great majority of the Egyptian population, were shunned and often persecuted by their Byzantine rulers until the conquest of Egypt by Islam, after which the slowly declining Coptic population was in a rather precarious position. Coptic architecture, therefore, lacked the lavish patronage of rulers and the Court, which was directly responsible for most of the important buildings of Byzantine and medieval Catholic architecture. Most buildings are small, conservative in design, and remain closer to vernacular styles. They also have a tendency to massive construction, which is partly a surviving Egyptian taste from the Pharaonic period, partly reflects the need to semi-fortify buildings, partly is an inevitable result of mudbrick construction of large structures, and is also partly to keep them cool in the Egyptian climate.

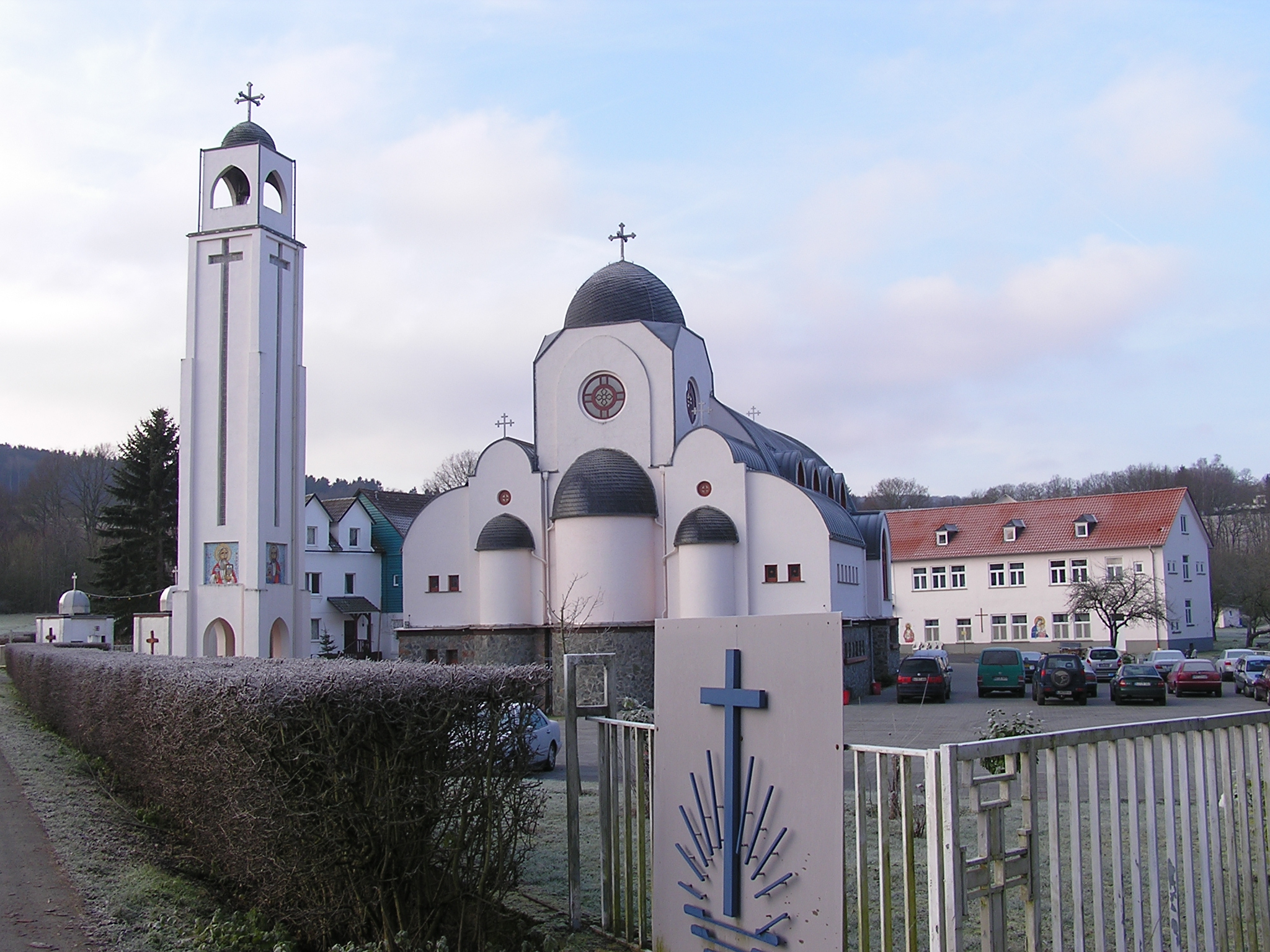
The Monastery of St. Anthony in Germany.

Well before the break of 451, Egyptian Christianity had pioneered monasticism, with many communities being established in deliberately remote positions, especially in Southern Egypt. The relatively large number of buildings surviving from the early periods of monasticism, from about the 5th century onwards, is one of the most important groups of early Christian buildings to remain, and offers a useful corrective to the Court art of Ravenna or Constantinople. Many very early wall paintings also survive. Even the ruins of monasteries in many places have survived in a good enough condition to impress the visitor and inform the art historian. Early Coptic architecture is therefore of great importance in the study of Early Christian architecture in general.

Despite the break with the other churches, aspects of the development of the arrangement of Coptic churches have paralleled those in Orthodoxy, such as the emergence of a solid iconostasis to separate the sanctuary, and the West, such as the movement over the centuries of the place of baptism from the narthex or outer porch into the rear of the nave. However, the existence of three altars in the sanctuary, sometimes in separate apses, is typically and distinctively Coptic. The altars themselves are always free-standing.

Especially between the Muslim conquest and the 19th century, the external facade of Coptic urban churches is usually plain and discreet, as is the roof line. Equally, the monasteries were often enclosed with high blank walls to defend them from desert raiders during the Middle Ages. However, internally the churches can be ornately decorated, although monumental sculpture of holy figures is avoided as in Orthodoxy.

Many Coptic monasteries and churches scattered throughout Egypt are built of mudbrick on the basilica plan inherited from Greco-Roman architectural styles. They usually have heavy walls and columns, architraves and barrel-vaulted roofs, and end in a tripartite apse, but many variant plans exist. Domes are small compared to Byzantine churches, and from the 10th-century naves are often roofed with domed cupolas. The dome raised on a circular supporting wall, which is so characteristic of later Byzantine architecture, is rarely used. Massive timber is often used across the nave, sometimes to support a flat roof, and sometimes to give structural strength to the walls. Inside the churches are richly decorated with frescoed murals and reliefs.

=== Iconostasis ===
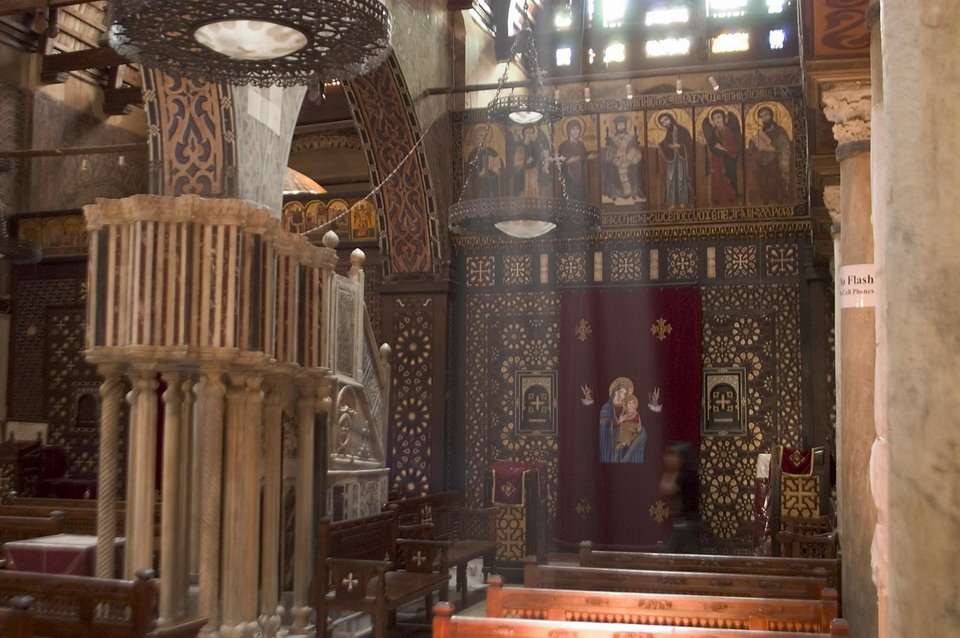
Pulpit and section of iconostasis inside The Hanging Church in Cairo

The screen known as the iconostasis separating the sanctuary from the main body of the church is one of the main features of any Coptic church. The Coptic iconostasis is usually less completely composed of icons than the Eastern Orthodox one, although there will always be several. It is very often an open-work screen, usually made of ebony and sometimes inlaid with ivory like that in Saint Mary Church (Harat Zewila). These may be in geometrical patterns comparable to the secular screens, which are a feature of traditional Egyptian houses.

The iconostasis of Saint Mary Church in Harat Zewila in Old Cairo, rebuilt after 1321, shows the mixture of stylistic elements in Coptic architecture. The basic plan is that of the basilica, and recycled ancient columns are used. The older woodwork is Islamic in style, as are the Muqarnas in the pendentives, and a Gothic revival rood cross surmounts the iconostasis. This uses Islamic abstract motifs, which are also common. Some screens are pierced rather than solid.

There are many examples of Coptic iconostasis that predate the earliest surviving Eastern and Western counterparts.

=== Khurus ===
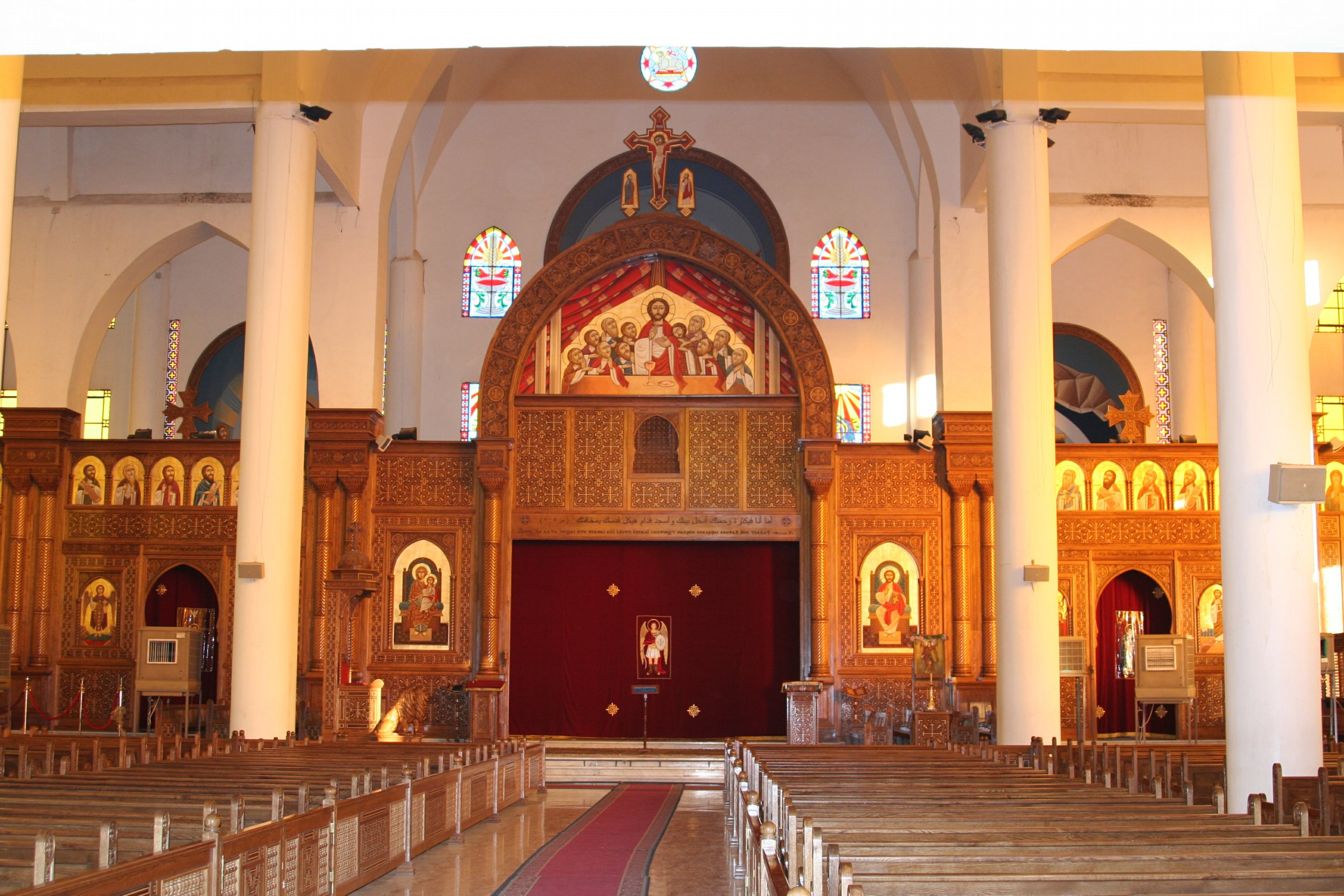
Archangel Michael's Coptic Orthodox Cathedral in Aswan

Between the 7th and 12th centuries, many churches were built or modified with a distinctive Coptic feature, the khurus, a space running across the whole width of the church separating the naos or nave from the sanctuary, similar to the choir in Western church architecture.

=== Decorative carving ===
Early Coptic buildings contain elaborate and vigorous decorative carving on the capitals of columns, or friezes, some of which include interlace, confronted animals, and other motifs. These are also related to Coptic illuminated manuscripts and fabrics, and are often regarded as significant influences both on early Islamic art, like the Mshatta facade and on the Insular art of the British Isles (which appears to have been in contact with Coptic monasteries). From Insular art these motifs developed into European Romanesque art.

== Examples ==
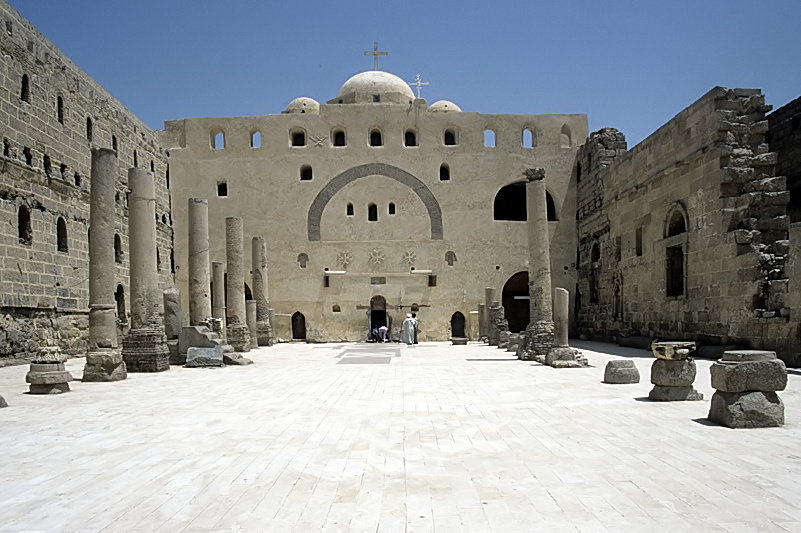
The White Monastery, with ancient Egyptian style elements

The architecture of many Coptic buildings remains poorly documented, as they become more at risk for abandonment, vandalism, and destruction. Time-sensitive architectural and cultural research projects are awaiting initiation.

Examples of significant Coptic architecture include:

- Cathedral ruins at Hermopolis Magna, built c. 430–440, in the Minya Governorate (Lower Egypt).
- The White Monastery and Red Monastery, near Souhag in the Sohag Governorate (Middle Egypt), with buildings from the 5th century and onwards.
- The "Coptic Cairo District" of Old Cairo (Lower Egypt), with numerous churches from the 7th century and onwards, including "The Hanging Church" and Saint Mary Church (Haret Elroum).
- The Deir el-Muharraq monastery complex (the Burned Monastery), near El-Qusiya in the Asyut Governorate (Upper Egypt). Established in the 4th century, with a 6th-7th century fortress, and churches from the 12th, 16th, 19th, and 20th centuries.

== Modern Coptic architecture ==
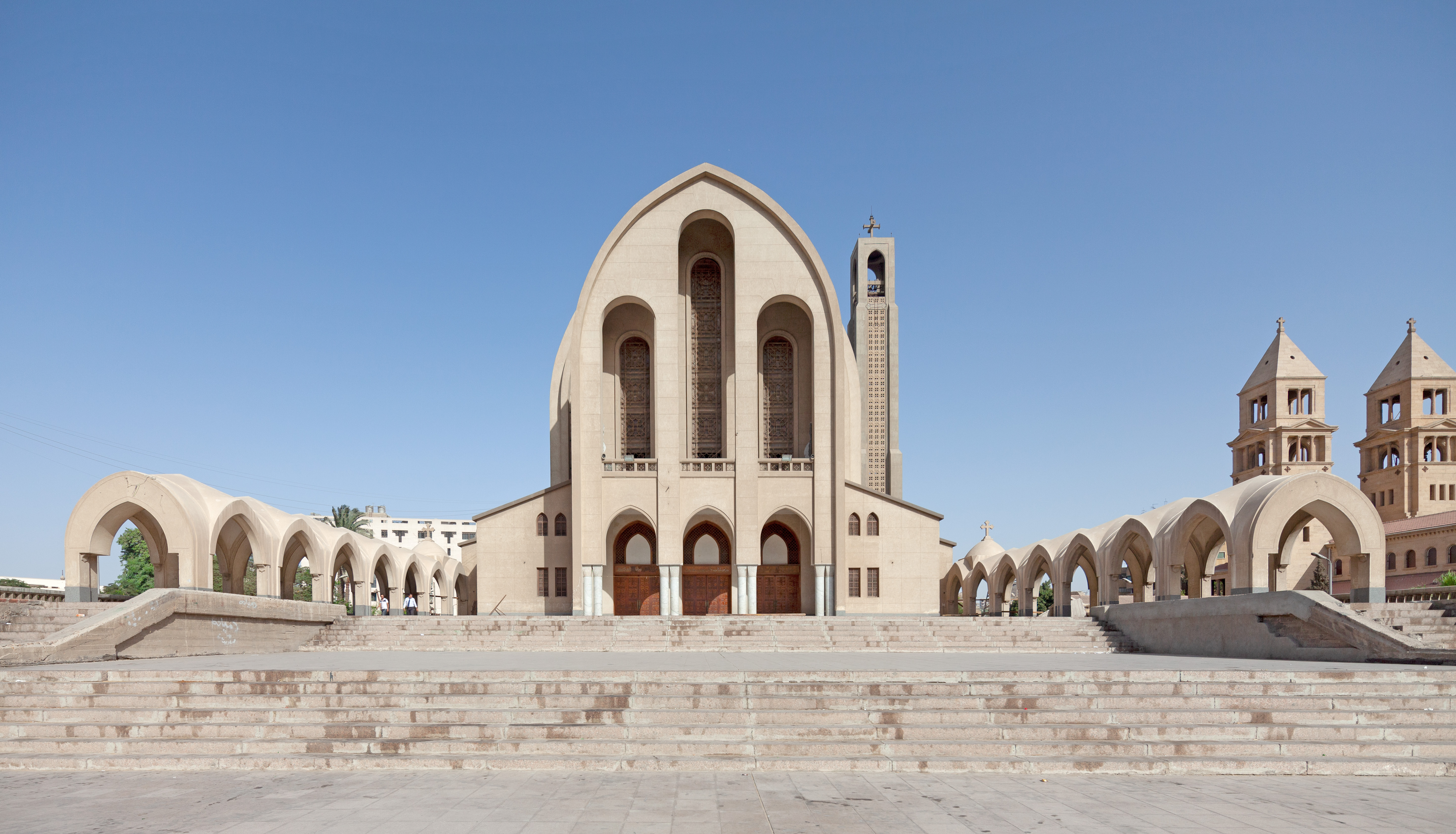
The Saint Mark's Coptic Orthodox Cathedral in Abbassia, Cairo, inaugurated in 1969

European architectural styles began to influence Coptic churches in the eighteenth century. Examples of modern Coptic churches that have features of European churches are St. Mary (El Marashly) Church in Zamalek, Cairo designed by famous Coptic architect Ramses Wissa Wassef, other examples of modern Coptic architecture are the Saint Mark's Coptic Orthodox Cathedral, Cairo consecrated in 1968 and Archangel Michael's Coptic Orthodox Cathedral consecrated in 2006.

The mark for the beginning of the revival of Coptic architecture was in the late eighteenth century by the building of the Saint Mark's Coptic Orthodox Cathedral in Azbakeya, Cairo, that became the seat of the Coptic Pope in 1800. Regulations preventing the building of new churches, which were put in place by the Ottomans, were progressively eased in the following years by successive governments of Egypt, allowing many churches to be rebuilt and new churches to be built after more than three hundred years of restrictions.

Modern Coptic churches generally follow similar architectural traditions to those of older churches, but are generally larger as well and may carry modern amenities and features. The Cathedral of the Nativity in Cairo, inaugurated in 2019, is the largest church in the Middle East.

== See also ==
- Coptic art
- List of Coptic Orthodox churches in the United States
