= Ezbet El Nakhl =

Ezbet El Nakhl is a district in the northern region of Greater Cairo, east of the Nile, in Egypt. The district is separated by the metro station (Ezbet El Nakhl station) into two regions, Eastern Ezbet El Nakhl & Western Ezbet El Nakhl.

== Name ==
The area is named Ezbet El Nakhl as the district was once farmland full of palm trees, نخل nakhl in Arabic. Today it is a residential area with very few palm trees remaining.

== Location ==
Ezbet El Nakhl is lodged between the Ain Shams and El Marg districts. The district has old Coptic churches which is St. Virgin Mary Church -Ezbet El Nakhl.

== About ==
Ezbet El Nakhl is partly a slum. One part belongs to the Cairo Governorate and the other to the Qalyubia Governorate. Being divided between two governorates means services like education and health are unreliable. Nearly a sixth of the residents are children under 5 years. There are only three public elementary schools in the district and the average number of children per classroom is 60.

== Charity ==
In 1980, Jehan Sadat, wife of then president Anwar Sadat, inaugurated the Salam Centre, a multipurpose center with a clinic where twenty volunteer doctors provide care. The center contains a nursery, a center for the disabled, professional workshops and a social club.

A hospital is currently operational, with a training center in order to employ people from the neighborhood and give them new opportunities.

== See also ==
- Garbage Dreams, documentary film
