= Lists of Coptic church buildings =

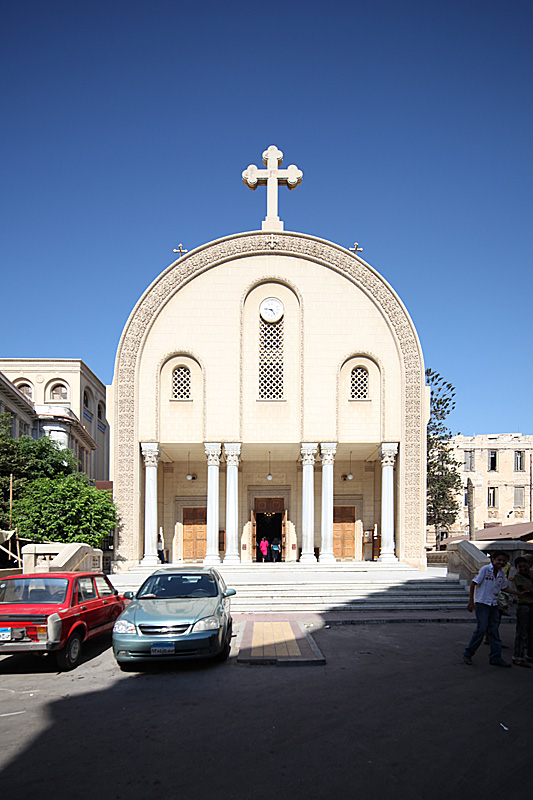
Saint Mark's Coptic Orthodox Cathedral (Alexandria)

Lists of Coptic church buildings cover church buildings that employ the Alexandrian Rite. They are organized by region or country. Egypt which is where the Coptic religion began is listed in Africa, although Egypt is in Africa and in Asia.

== Africa ==
=== Democratic Republic of the Congo ===
- St Mark's Coptic Orthodox Church, Lubumbashi, Democratic Republic of the Congo

=== Egypt ===
See List of Coptic Orthodox churches in Egypt

=== Ethiopia ===
- St Luke's Coptic Orthodox Church, Gombe, Ethiopia

=== Kenya ===
- St Pishoy's Coptic Orthodox Church, Bondo, Kenya
- St Takla's Coptic Orthodox Church, Ng-lya, Kenya
- St Mina Monastery, Maseno, Kenya
- St Mark's Coptic Orthodox Church, Kisumu, Kenya
- St Anthony's Coptic Orthodox Church, Lela, Kenya
- St Mark's Coptic Orthodox Church, Nairobi, Kenya
- St Mary's Coptic Orthodox Church, Tala, Kenya
- St Mark's Coptic Orthodox Church, Kinyui, Kenya

=== Sudan ===
- Holy Mary Coptic Orthodox Cathedral, Khartoum, Sudan
- Saint Mary and Saint Shenouda, Khartoum, Sudan
- Mar Girgis Coptic Church (St. George), Omdurman, Sudan

=== Tanzania ===
- St Mary's Coptic Orthodox Church, Musoma, Tanzania
- St Mina's Coptic Orthodox Church, Tarime, Tanzania

=== West Africa ===
- St Marc's Coptic Orthodox Church, Abidjan, Ivory Coast
- Accra Coptic Orthodox Church, Accra, Ghana
- Lome Coptic Orthodox Church, Lomé, Togo
- St Mark's Coptic Orthodox Church, Lagos, Nigeria
- St Mary's Coptic Orthodox Church, Calabar, Nigeria

=== Southern Africa ===
- St Mark's Coptic Orthodox Church, Lusaka, Zambia
- St Mark's Coptic Orthodox Church, Harare, Zimbabwe
- St Mark's Coptic Orthodox Church, Ondangwa, Namibia
- The Virgin Mary and St Mark's Coptic Orthodox Church, Johannesburg, South Africa

== Asia ==
=== East Asia ===
- St Mark and St George's Coptic Orthodox Church, Bangkok, Thailand
- St Mary and St Mark's Coptic Orthodox Church, Malacca, Malaysia
- St Mark's Coptic Orthodox Church, Singapore, Singapore
- St Mary & Archangel Michael Coptic Orthodox Church, Guangzhou, China
- St Thomas's Coptic Orthodox Church, Hong Kong
- St Mary's Coptic Orthodox Church, Seoul, South Korea
- St George's Coptic Orthodox Church, Kurayoshi, Tottori, Japan

=== Israel/Palestine ===
- St Antony Monastery, Jerusalem
- Church of the Holy Sepulchre, Jerusalem
- St. Mary Coptic Orthodox Convent and Church, Bethlehem, West Bank
- Coptic Church of the Annunciation, Nazareth, Israel

=== Gulf States ===
- St Mary & Archangel Mikhail Coptic Orthodox Church, Al Jazirah Al Hamra, United Arab Emirates
- Abu Sefeen Coptic Orthodox Church, Sharjah, United Arab Emirates
- St Mark and Anba Bishoy's Coptic Orthodox Church, Dubai, United Arab Emirates
- St Mina's Coptic Orthodox Church, Jebel Ali, United Arab Emirates
- St Antony's Coptic Orthodox Church, Abu Dhabi, United Arab Emirates
- St Mary and St Shenoudah's Coptic Orthodox Church, Al Ain, United Arab Emirates
- St Peter & St Paul's Coptic Orthodox Church, Doha, Qatar
- St Mark Coptic Orthodox Church, Kuwait City, Kuwait

=== Mediterranean and the Levant ===
- Amman Coptic Orthodox Church, Amman, Jordan
- St Mark's Coptic Orthodox Church, Nicosia, Cyprus

=== Pakistan ===
- St Mark's Coptic Orthodox Church, Rawalpindi, Pakistan

== Australia ==
See List of Coptic Orthodox churches in Australia

== France ==
- Ermitage St Mark, Le Revest-les-Eaux
- St Marc & St George's Coptic Orthodox Church, Marseille
- Ste Marie & St Mina's Coptic Orthodox Church, Marseille
- Ste Marie & St Marcorios & St Antoine's Coptic Orthodox Church, Rillieux-la-Pape
- Monastere de la St Vierge Marie et de l’Archange Michel, Ronchères
- Ste Marie & St Marc, Châtenay-Malabry
- Archange Michel Et St Georges, Villejuif
- Ste Marie Des Coptes, Paris
- Ste Marie & St Jean L’Evangeliste, Drancy
- Paroisse St Moïse Le Noir Et St Samuel Le Confesseur, Deuil-la-Barre
- St Mina & St Mercurios, Colombes
- St Maurice & St Verena, Asnières-sur-Seine

== North America ==
=== Canada ===
See List of Coptic Orthodox Churches in Canada

=== Mexico ===
- St. Mary and St. Mark's Coptic Orthodox Church, Tlayacapan

=== United States ===
See List of Coptic Orthodox Churches in the United States

== South America ==
- St Mary and St Mark's Coptic Orthodox Church, Santa Cruz, Bolivia
- Virgin Mary & St Paul's Coptic Orthodox Church, Ciudad del Este, Paraguay
- São Marcos's Coptic Orthodox Church, Jabaquara, Brazil

== United Kingdom ==
=== England ===
- St Mark's Coptic Orthodox Church, in London
- St Mary & St George's Coptic Orthodox Church, Plymouth, Devon
- St Peter & St Paul's Coptic Orthodox Church, Bournemouth
- St Samuel the Confessor Coptic Orthodox Church, Dorset
- St Mary and St Abram Coptic Orthodox Church, Brighton
- St Michael and St Bishoy Coptic Orthodox Church, Margate, Kent
- St Augustine's Coptic Orthodox Church, Guildford
- St Mary and St Shenouda Coptic Orthodox Church, Coulsdon
- St John the Evangelist Coptic Orthodox Church, Kent
- St Mary and Pope Kirolos Coptic Orthodox Church, Hounslow
- St Mary & Archangel Michael Coptic Orthodox Church, Golders Green
- St George's Coptic Orthodox Church, Stevenage
- St Mary & St Mark Coptic Orthodox Church, Lapworth
- St Mary and Archangel Michael Coptic Orthodox Church, Solihull
- St Mary and St Antony Coptic Orthodox Church, Solihull
- St Anthanasius's Coptic Orthodox Church, Easton
- St Mary and Saint George Coptic Orthodox Church, Nottingham
- St Mary & St Mina Coptic Orthodox Church, Stockport
- St Antony's Coptic Orthodox Church, Rotherham
- St Mary and St Abanoub Coptic Orthodox Church, Otley
- St Athanasius Monastery, Scarborough
- St George and St Athanasius Coptic Orthodox Cathedral, Newcastle upon Tyne

=== Northern Ireland ===
- St Steven's Coptic Orthodox Church, Belfast

=== Scotland ===
- St Mark's Coptic Orthodox Church, Fife

=== Wales ===
- St Mary and St Mercurius Coptic Orthodox Church, Newport
- St Mary and St Abaskhyron Coptic Orthodox Church, Llandudno
