= Saint Shenouda Coptic Orthodox Church =

Coptic church in Hurghada, Egypt

Saint Shenouda Coptic Orthodox Cathedral
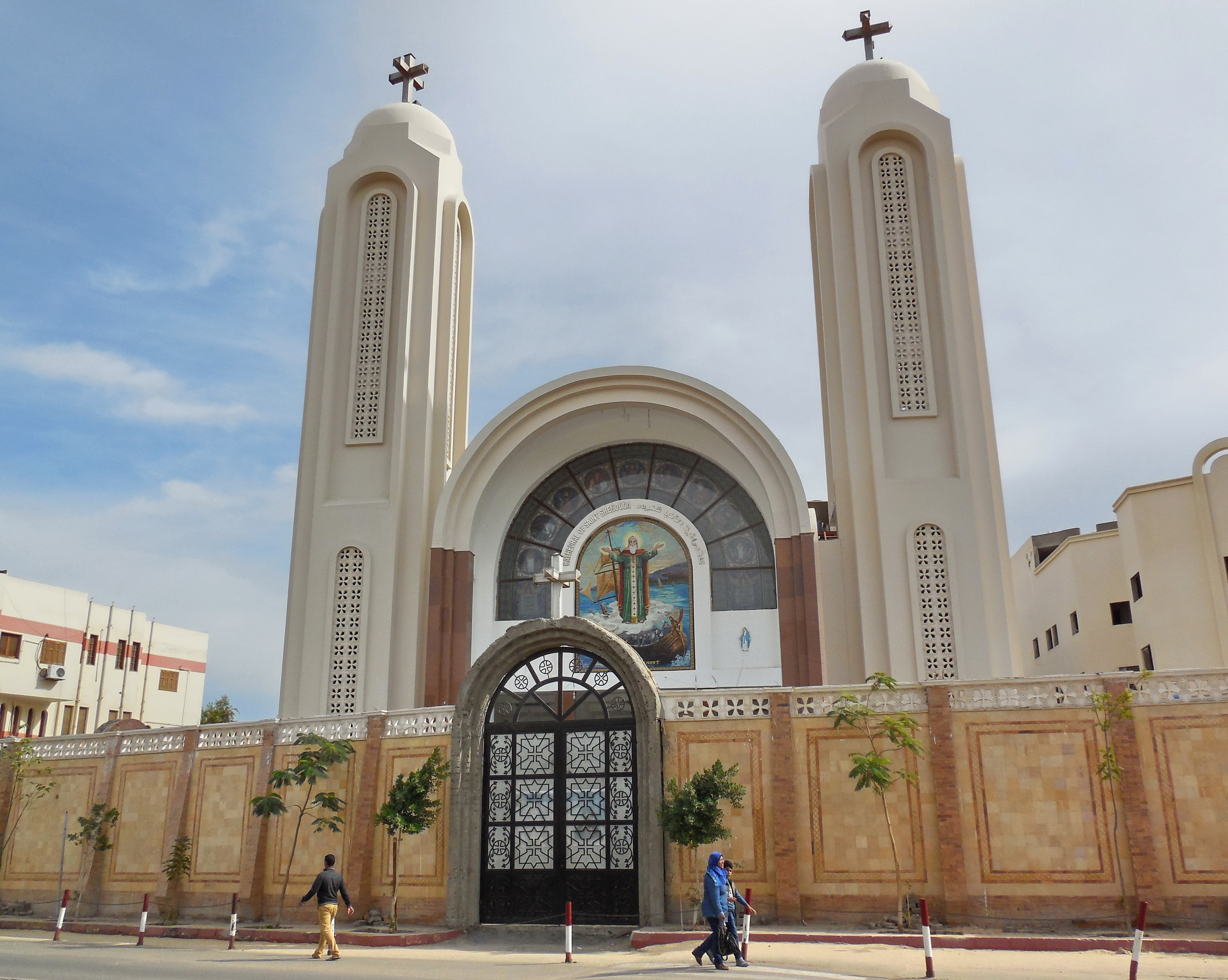
- Saint Shenouda Coptic Orthodox Cathedral
- 27°15′16″N 33°48′58″E
- Address: Hurghada, Egypt
- Country: Egypt
- Denomination: Coptic Orthodox Church

Saint Shenouda Coptic Orthodox Cathedral is a Coptic church located in the El Dahar neighborhood of Hurghada, Egypt. The church is dedicated to Saint Shenouda.

== See also ==
- Media related to Coptic Orthodox Church Hurghada at Wikimedia Commons
- List of Coptic Orthodox churches in Egypt
