= Sunbat =

Village in Gharbia, Egypt

- Location in Egypt
- Coordinates: 30.8071°N 31.2123°E
- Country: Egypt
- Governorate: Gharbia
- Time zone: UTC+2 (EET)
  - Summer (DST): UTC+3 (EEST)

Sunbat is a village in the Gharbia Governorate, Egypt.

The population was 20,599 in 2006.

The town contains the St. Rebecca Coptic Orthodox Church.

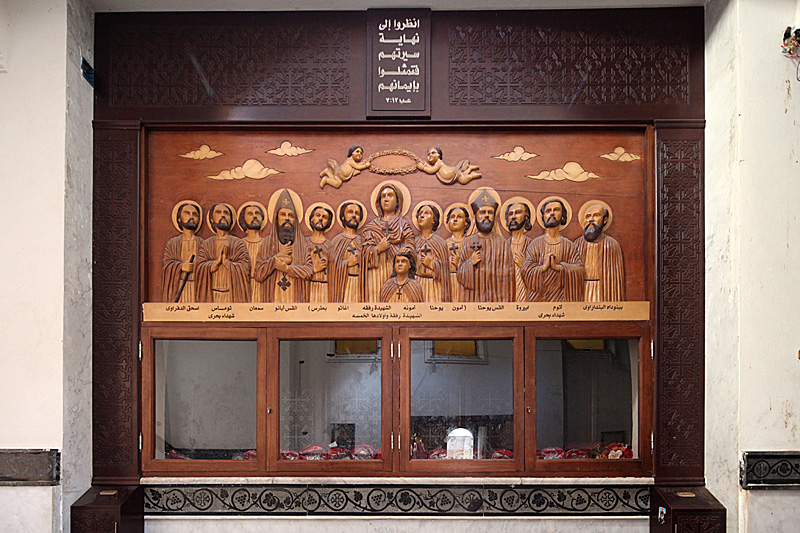
Relics shrine in the Church of St. Rebecca, Sunbat, Egypt
