= El Matareya, Cairo =

Urban district in Egypt

Coordinates: 30°7′46.08″N 31°18′26.94″E

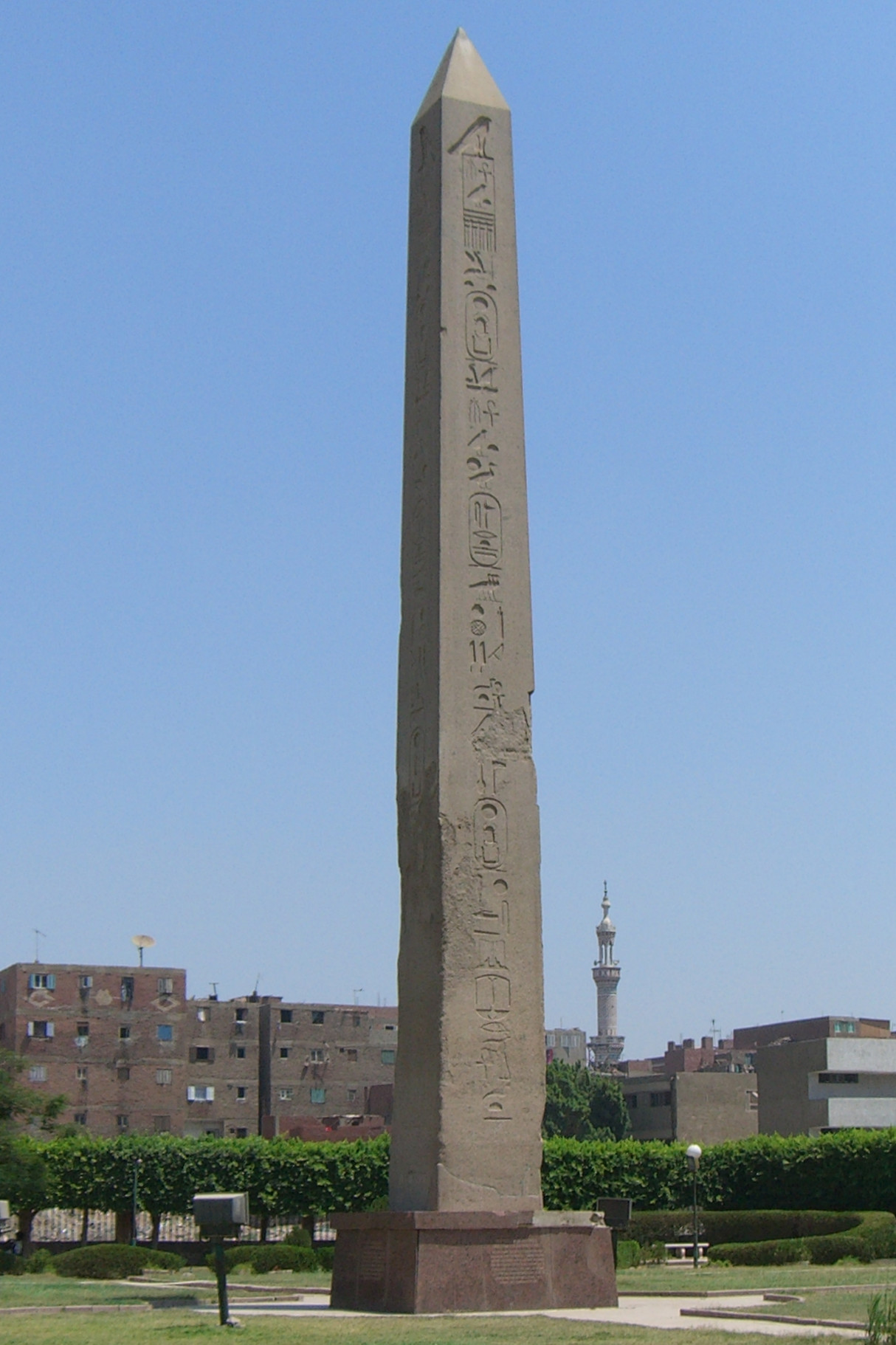
Mataria, with the Masalla Obelisk of Senusret I.

El Matareya (Arabic: المطرية [el.mɑ.tˤɑ.ˈɾej.jɑ]) is a district in the Eastern Area of Cairo, Egypt. The district is unrelated to the coastal town in the Dakahlia Governorate, that is also named El Matareya. The district holds the ruins of the ancient Egyptian city of Heliopolis, one of the oldest cities of ancient Egypt.

== Name ==
The name, El Matareya, is thought to come from the Latin word Mater which means 'mother', and is from the presence of the 'tree of the Virgin Mary' in this district.

== History ==
El Matareya, with the nearby Ain Shams district, had a notable history during Egypt's Pharaonic period as a part of ancient Heliopolis. The district has archaeological sites of the period, some only recently discovered, beneath its current structures. In ancient Roman times Heliopolis belonged to the Augustamnica province. Legend tells of the Christian Holy Family sheltering under a tree in Heliopolis, presently known as 'the tree of the Virgin Mary', now with the Chapel of the Virgin in El Matareya.

The French naturalist Pierre Belon du Mans mentions visiting El Matareya in his 1547 journey to Egypt. El Matareya once had the villas of prominent people. The famous Egyptian poet Ahmed Shawqi lived in a villa he named ‘Karmet Ibn Hani’ or Ibn Hani's Vineyard (كرمة ابن هانى) here, near the palace of the Khedive Abbas II at Saray El-Qobba, until his exile from Egypt at World War I.

=== Historic elements ===
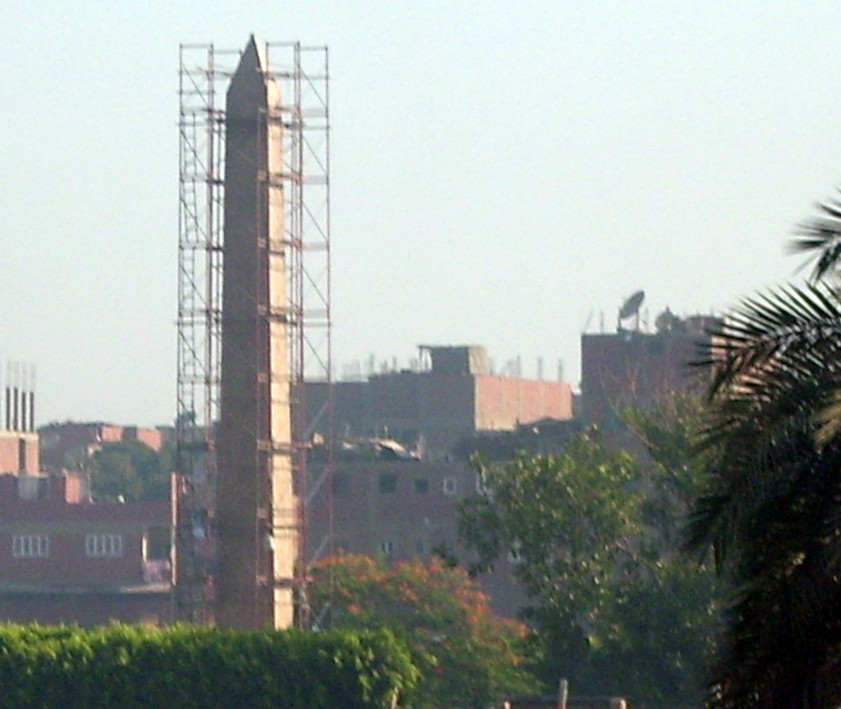
The Masalla Obelisk, in El Matareya.

The El Masalla area of the district contains the ancient Masalla Obelisk, or Misalla (Arabic: المسلة, trans. obelisk), one of the Pharaonic era obelisks that still remain in Egypt. It is the only surviving element of Heliopolis standing in its original position, and of the great Temple of Ra—Atum constructed by Pharaoh Senusret I (1971—1926 BCE) of the Twelfth Dynasty. The 68 ft (20.73 m) tall red granite obelisk weighs 120 tons—240,000 pounds (110,000 kg).

A pink granite megalithic colossus statue, with features resembling those of the Pharaoh Ramesses II, was found in El Matareya in 2006, weighing five tons—11,023 pounds (5,000 kg). It was at the ruins of a sun temple dating back to the reign of Ramses II (reigned 1279—1213 BCE), at the site of later Souk El-Khamis.

The underground tombs of High Priests of Re of the Sixth Dynasty (2345—2181 BCE) were found in the southeast corner of the Re-Atum Temple archaeological site in El Matareya. The Necropolis of Heliopolis, 3 miles (4.8 km) east of the Masalla obelisk in El Matareya, dates from the Middle Kingdom (c. 2055—1550 BCE) and New Kingdom (c. 1550—1069 BCE). A domed tomb made for a priest during the Twenty-sixth Dynasty (c. 685—525 BCE), was discovered under a construction site in 2004. Many funereal small figure statues were found inside (over 400), and hieroglyphic writing was on the tomb's walls from the seventh century BCE.

In March 2017, the Egyptian-German team of archaeologists unearthed an eight-meter 3,000-year-old statue that included a head and a torso thought to depict Pharaoh Ramses II. According to Khaled El-Enany, the Egyptian Antiquities Minister, the statue was more likely thought to be King Psammetich I. Excavators also revealed an 80 cm-long part of a limestone statue of Pharaoh Seti II while excavating the site.

=== Pilgrimage site ===
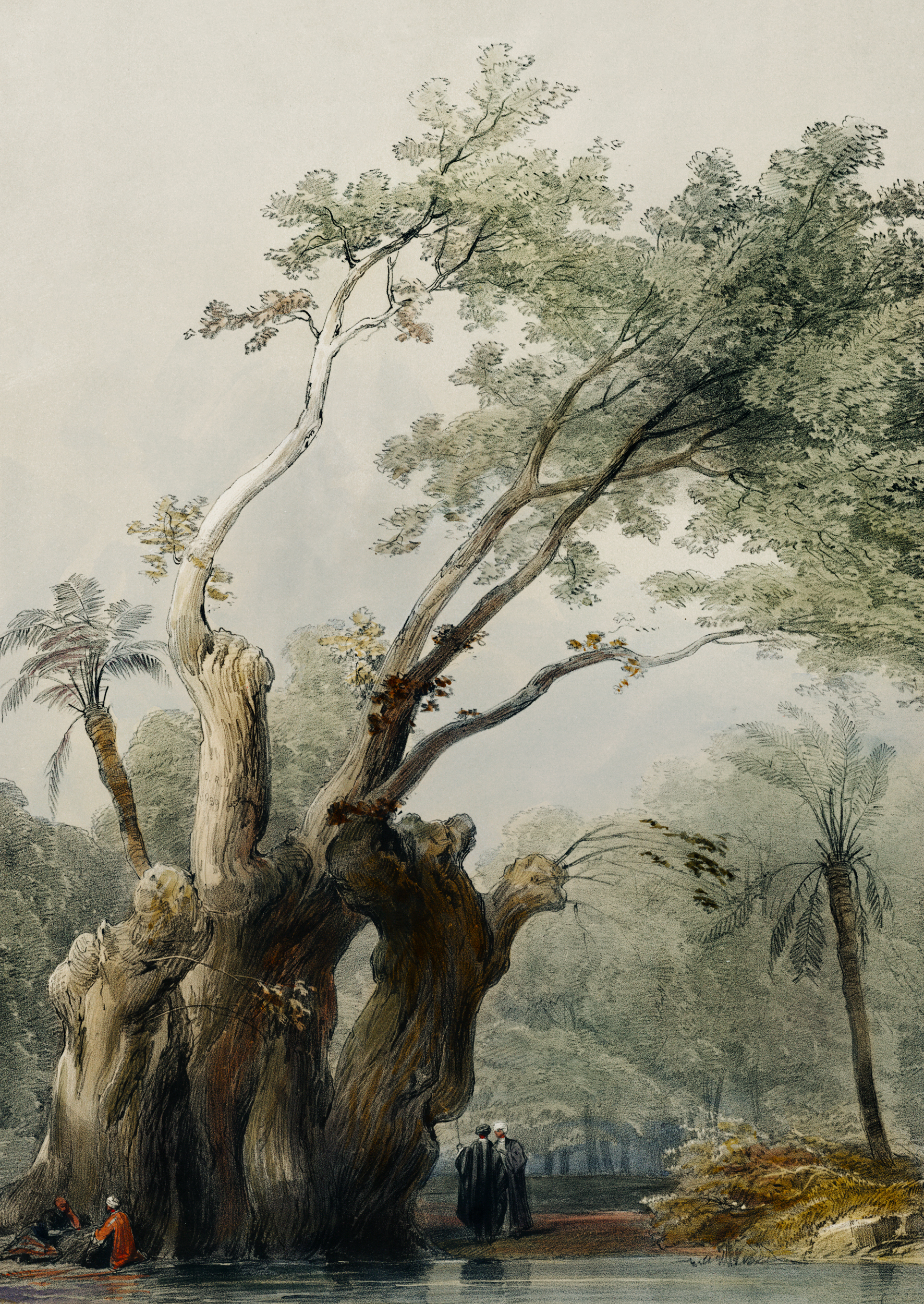
Holy Tree of Metereah, c.1840, from The Holy Land, Syria, Idumea, Arabia, Egypt, and Nubia

A sycamore tree within the suburb, known locally as the Tree of the Virgin, has been a place of pilgrimage for Coptic Christians for many centuries, who come to pray by it or touch it, believing that it will heal illness. According to local beliefs, the Virgin Mary and Saint Joseph stopped at El Matareya (then a small village) when they fled into Egypt. Mary rested against the tree and a spring of water sprang up near it for Mary to wash the infant Jesus. For many years its bark was taken by Christians in the belief that it had miraculous properties. Next to the tree is a small chapel.

== Administrative subdivisions ==
Matariya is subdivided into nine shiakhas.

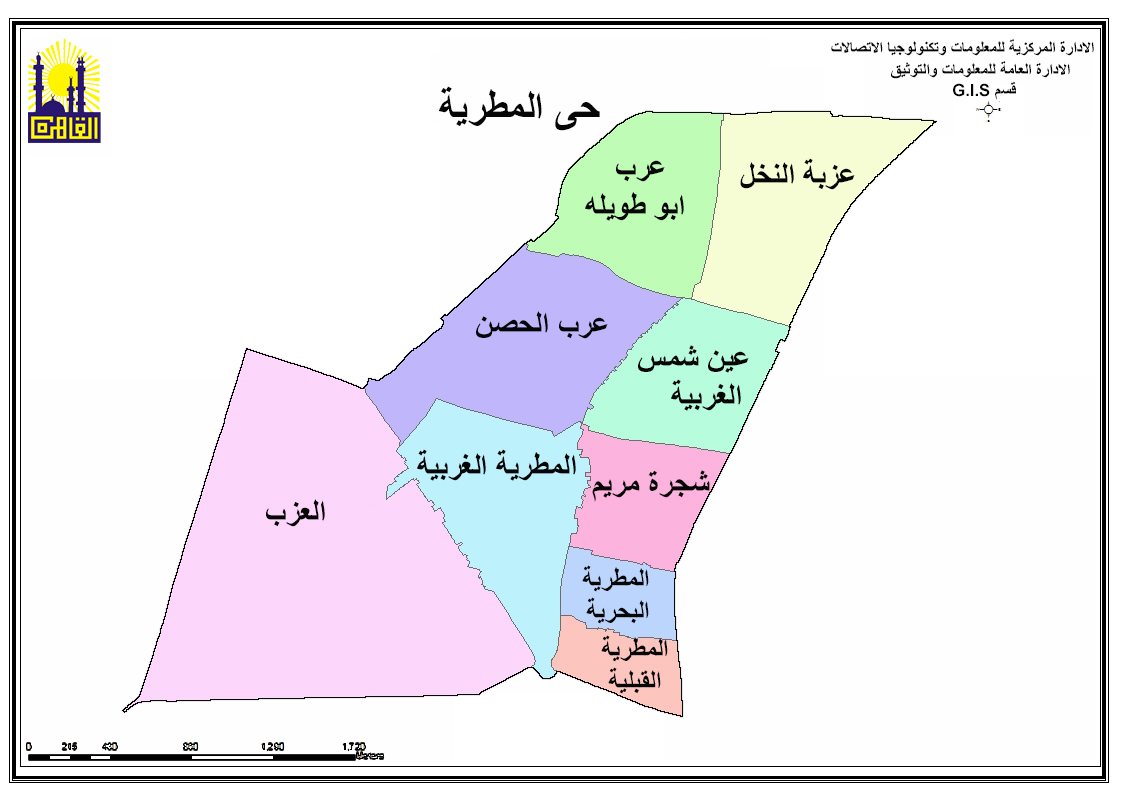
Al-Matariya District map by shiakha

In the 2017 census Matariya had 602,485 residents across its nine shiakhas.

Shiakhas	Code 2017	Population
`Arab Abû Ṭawîla	013306	79,397
`Arab al-Ḥiṣn	013307	25,995
`Ayn Shams al-gharbiyya	013308	60,375
`Izab, al-	013301	206,947
`Izbat al-Nakhl	013309	82,863
Matariyya al-qibliyya, al-	013304	16,361
Maṭariyya al-baḥriyya, al-	013302	14,487
Maṭariyya al-gharbiyya, al-	013303	86,971
Shajarat Maryam	013305	29,089

== Education ==
- Desert Research Center, established by Laszlo Almasy
- Faculty of Engineering, Helwan University
- National Urology Institute of Egypt
- El Matareya Teaching Hospital

== Industry ==
The western part of El Matareya, within the industrial area of Musturud along the Ismailia canal, is the location of oil companies (Shell, Misr Petrol, and General Association of Oil in Egypt), and food industries (BiscoMisr and Misr lil Albaan).
