= Archangel Michael's Coptic Orthodox Cathedral =

Coptic church in Egypt

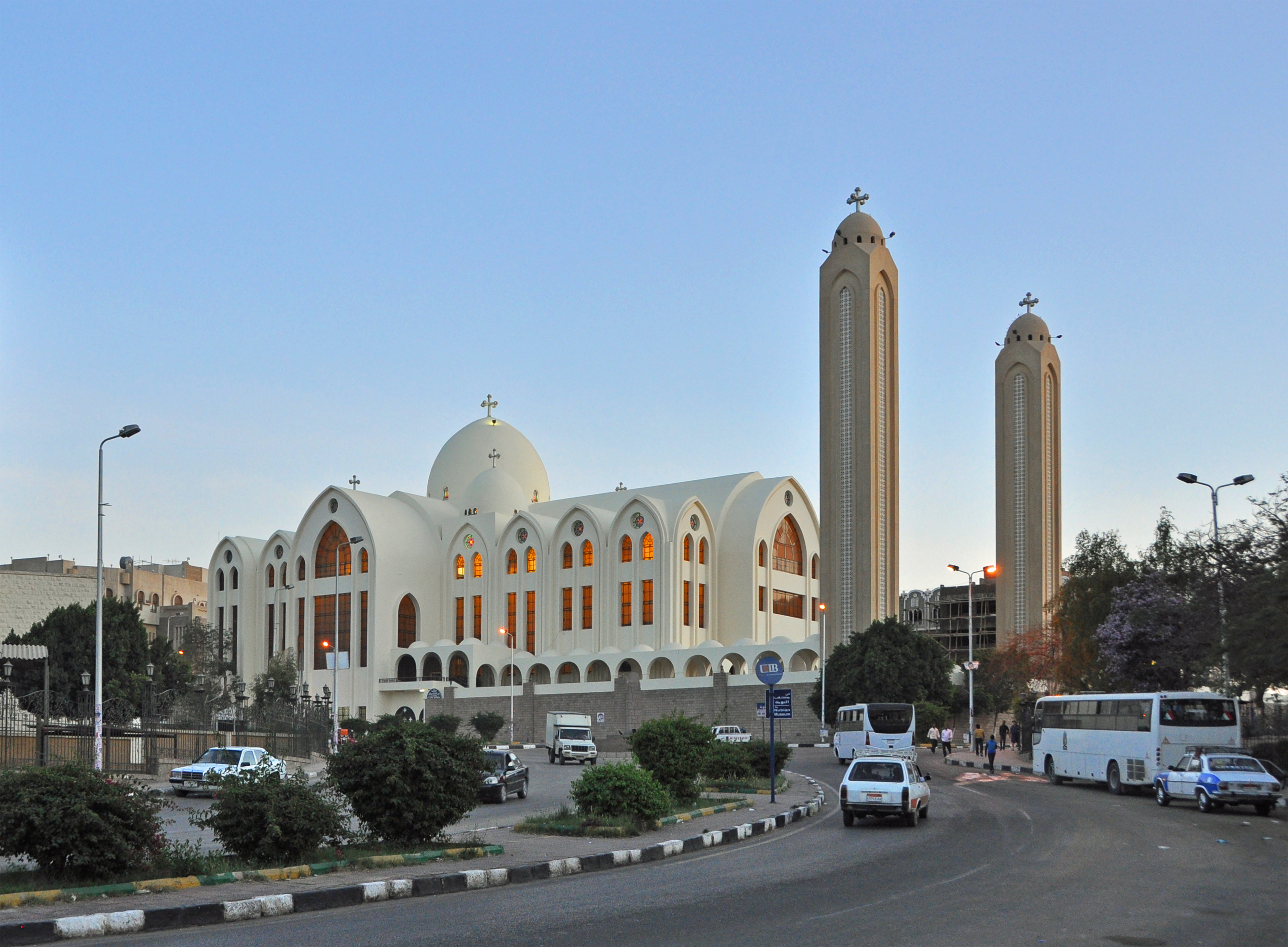
- Archangel Michael's Coptic Orthodox Cathedral
- 24.0829°N 32.8906°E
- Address: Aswan, Egypt
- Country: Egypt
- Denomination: Coptic Orthodox Church

History
- Consecrated: 2006

Archangel Michael's Coptic Orthodox Cathedral is a Coptic church located in Aswan, Egypt. It is the second largest Coptic Orthodox cathedral in Egypt. The church is dedicated to Archangel Michael. The church was consecrated in 2006.

== See also ==
- Media related to Saint Michael's Coptic Orthodox Cathedral in Aswan at Wikimedia Commons
- List of Coptic Orthodox churches in Egypt
