= Sawada, Egypt =

Village in Egypt

Sawada سوادة
- Village
- Location in Egypt
- Coordinates: 28.0785°N 30.7922°E
- Country: Egypt
- Governorate: Minya
- Time zone: UTC+2 (EET)
  - Summer (DST): UTC+3 (EEST)

Sawada (Arabic: سوادة) is a village in the Minya Governorate, Egypt, on the eastern side of the Nile. It borders the city New Minya.

The village had a population of 10,571 in 2006.
