= Ain Shams =

Ain Shams عين شمس
- District
- Location in Egypt
- Coordinates: 30°07′40″N 31°19′45″E
- Country: Egypt
- Governorate: Cairo Governorate
- Time zone: UTC+2 (EET)
  - Summer (DST): UTC+3 (EEST)

Ain Shams (also spelled Ayn or Ein - Arabic: عين شمس, [ʕeːn ʃæms], Coptic: ⲱⲛ ⲡⲉⲧ ⲫⲣⲏ) is a district in the Eastern Area of Cairo, Egypt. The name means "Eye of the Sun" in Arabic, referring to the fact that the district contained the ruins of the ancient city of Heliopolis, once the spiritual centre of ancient Egyptian sun-worship, and settled since 3100 BCE following the Predynastic Period. However, administratively the visible ruins today lie in the district of al-Matariya. the Zoroastrian Persians claimed it was built by Hushang, while the medieval Arabs believed it had been built by an Amelekite king by the name of Al-Walīd ibn Dawmaʿ, or perhaps his son.

== Administrative subdivisions and population ==
Ain Shams is divided into six shiakhas (census blocks/quarters), which had a total of 614,391 residents in the 2017 census, making it the third most populous district in Cairo:

Shiakha	Code 2017	Population
Zahrâ’ et Masâkin al-Ḥilmiyya, al-	013401	206210
Ḥilmiyyat al-Zaytûn	013402	27419
Ḥilmiyyat al-Na`âm	013403	18366
Ṭulumbât `Ayn Shams	013404	207248
`Ayn Shams al-sharqiyya	013405	138591
Manshiyyat al-Taḥrîr	013406	16557

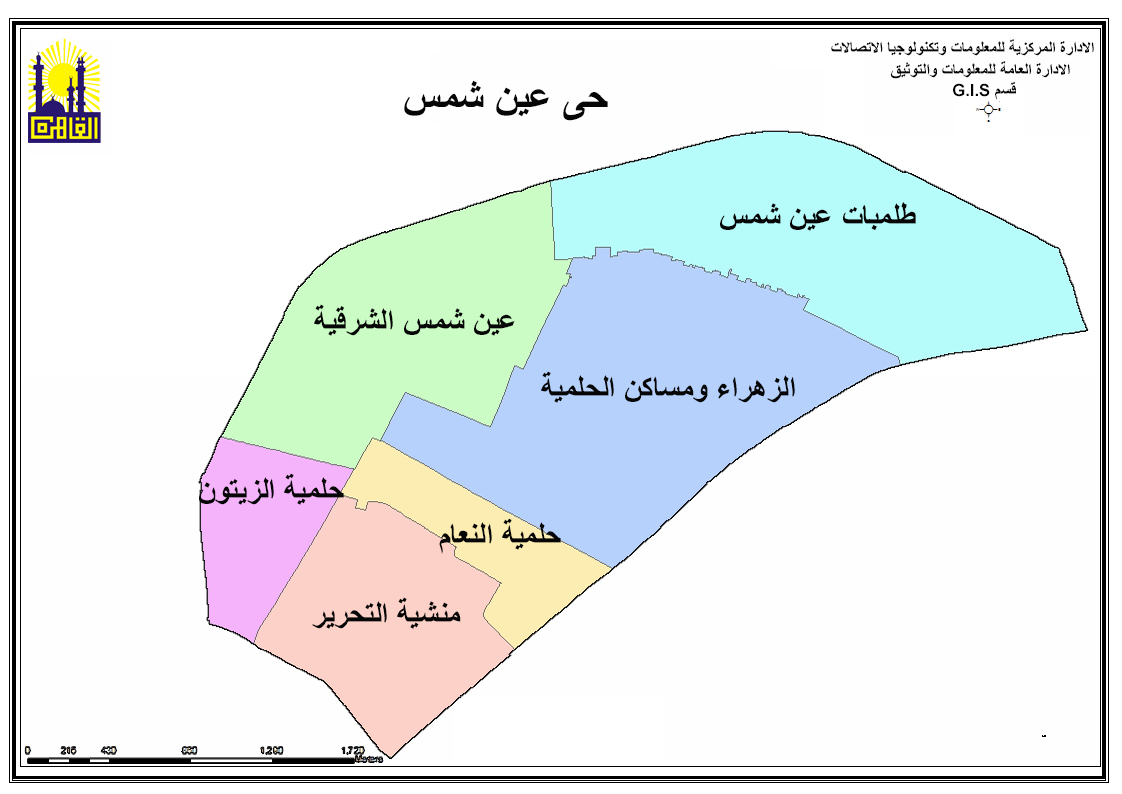

== See also ==
- Ain Shams University
