= St. Mark Coptic Orthodox Church (Centennial, Colorado) =

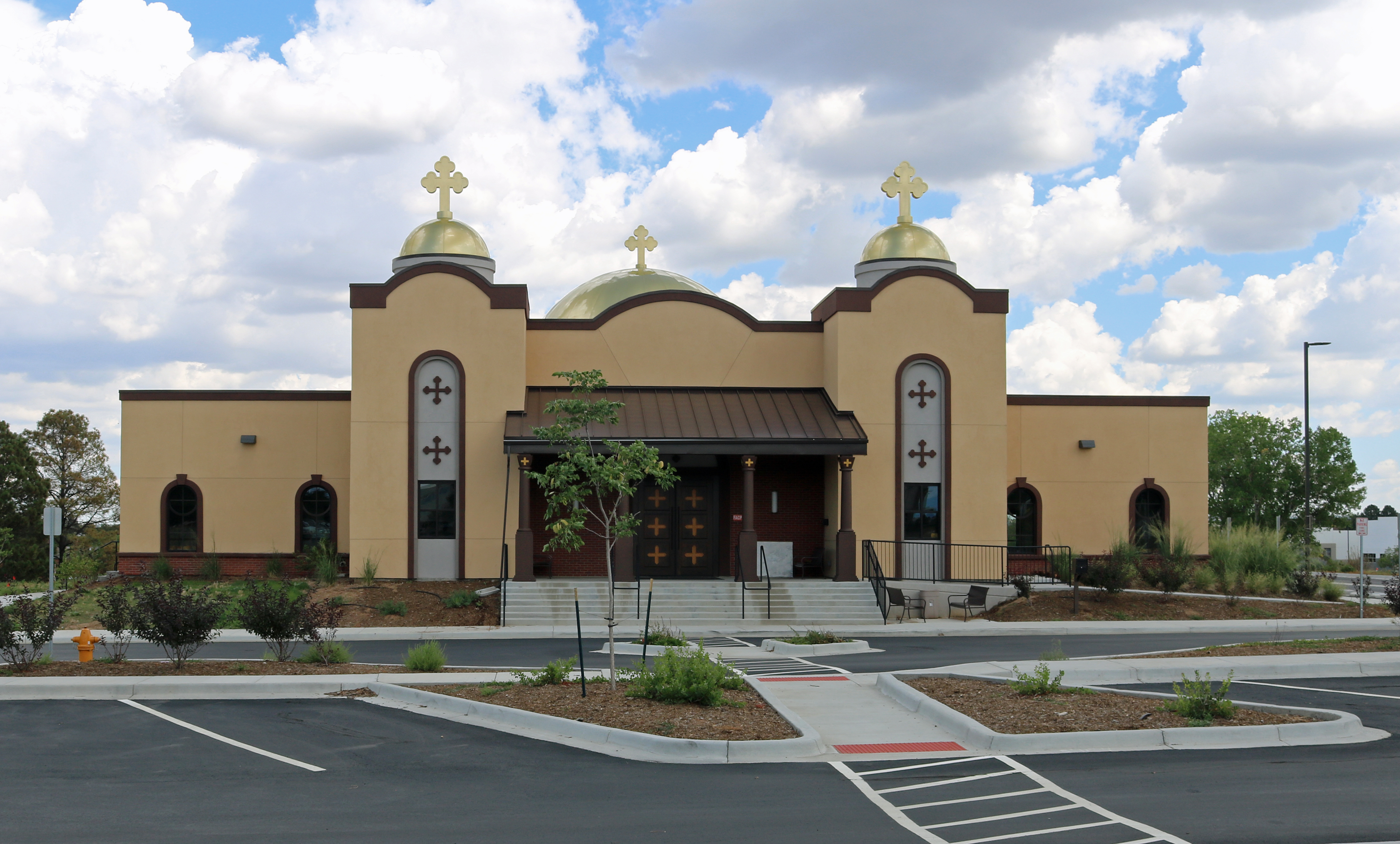
- The church in 2022.
- St. Mark Coptic Orthodox Church
- 39°35′20″N 104°50′34″W
- Location: 7075 South Revere Parkway Centennial, Colorado 80112
- Country: United States of America
- Denomination: Coptic Orthodox Church
- Website: https://www.stmarkdenver.org/

History
- Founded: 1971

Architecture
- Architectural type: church
- Style: Coptic
- Years built: 2020

Administration
- Division: The Coptic Orthodox Patriarchate
- Diocese: Coptic Archdiocese of Northern California & Western United States, under the Pope of Alexandria

Clergy
- Bishop: Pope Theodoros II
- Priest: Fr. Yacob Soliman

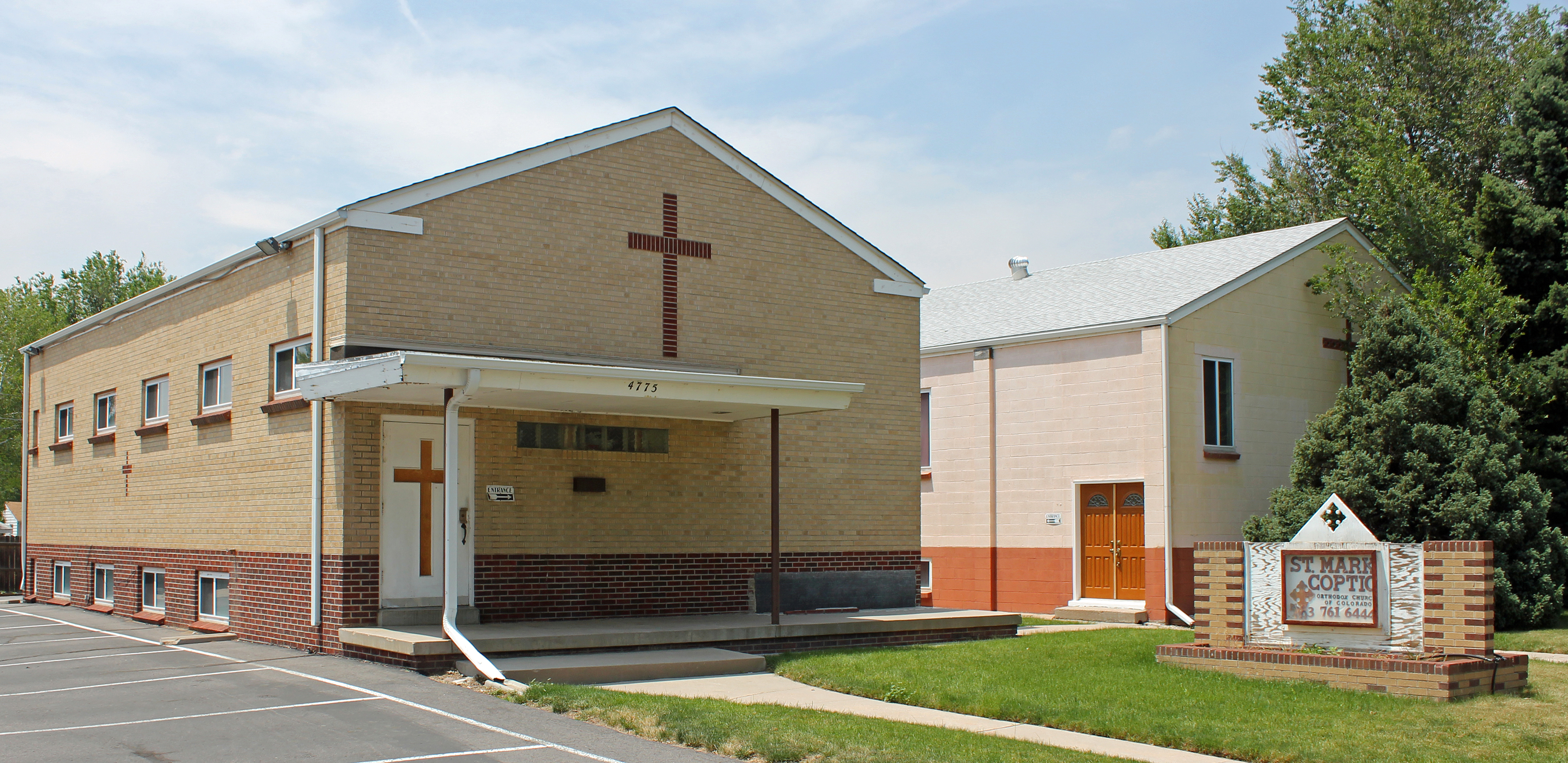
The church's previous location in Englewood, Colorado

St Mark Coptic Orthodox Church (Coptic: // transliteration: ti.eklyseya en.remenkimi en.orthodoxos ente fi.ethowab Markos) is one of the oldest Coptic Orthodox parishes to be established in North America. It is one of over 200 Coptic Orthodox Churches in the US.

== History of the Church ==
St. Mark's Coptic Orthodox Church in Englewood, Colorado, the church's previous location, was founded as one of the first four Coptic Orthodox Church parishes in the United States and was incorporated in December 1971, with about 50 families at the time. As Pope Shenouda III was enthroned as the Coptic Pope on November 14 of that same year, this was the first Coptic church that was founded under the papacy of Pope Shenouda, who died 17 March 2012.

Pope Cyril VI, Shenouda's predecessor, founded the first four churches in North America. The first two parishes that were established in the US specifically were St. Mark's Church in Jersey City and St. Mark's Church in Los Angeles.

The late Father Bishoy Kamel, who is widely known as a prominent Copt in the modern era, helped found the church in the Denver area during its early years. As a matter of fact, Fr. Bishoy Kamel helped found St. Mark's Church in Los Angeles, as well as several other parishes and buildings throughout Egypt, the United States, Europe, and Australia.

The previous building was consecrated in October 1989 by Pope Shenouda on his second visit (the first one being in 1977), the same year where the Pope visited every Coptic parish in the US and Canada.

The church was served by more than one temporary priest over the years. Fr. Angelos Habib Boghdadi served the parish in its early years, as well as several other Coptic Churches throughout the States over many years. There were several priests afterwards until Fr. Yacob Soliman eventually became permanent priest in 2004, a position of which he holds as the incubant.

=== New church building ===
The congregation moved to a newly-constructed church building in Centennial, Colorado in late 2020.

As of 2022, St. Mark's Church remains as the only Coptic church in Colorado. There are currently more than 100 Coptic families served by St. Mark's Church.

== See also ==
- Coptic Orthodox Church
- Seat of the Coptic Orthodox Pope of Alexandria
- Coptic architecture
- Coptic Cairo
- Coptic Orthodox Church in North America
  - Coptic Orthodox Church in Canada
  - Coptic Orthodox Church in the United States
  - List of Coptic Orthodox Churches in the United States
    - St. George Coptic Orthodox Church (Philadelphia)
    - St. Mark Coptic Orthodox Church (Jersey City, New Jersey)
    - St. Mark Coptic Orthodox Church (Los Angeles)
    - St. Mary Coptic Orthodox Church (Lancaster, Pennsylvania)
    - St. Mary Coptic Orthodox Church (Los Angeles)
    - St. Mary & St. Antonios Coptic Orthodox Church (Ridgewood, Queens)
    - St. George Coptic Orthodox Church (Brooklyn)
    - St. George & St. Shenouda Coptic Orthodox Church (Jersey City, New Jersey)
