= Coptic Americans =

Americans of Coptic birth or descent

ⲛⲓⲣⲉⲙⲛⲭⲏⲙⲓ `ⲛⲁⲙⲉⲣⲓⲕⲏ
- (United States)

Total population
- c. 500,000 (2018 est.)

Regions with significant populations
- Northern New Jersey and the New York City Metropolitan Area; as well as Southern California

Languages
- American English; Mainly older people: Arabic (Egyptian Arabic, Sudanese Arabic, Libyan Arabic); Liturgical: Coptic language

Religion
- Primarily Coptic Orthodoxy; minority Coptic Catholic

Coptic Americans (Coptic: ⲛⲓⲣⲉⲙⲛⲭⲏⲙⲓ ⲛ̀ⲁⲙⲉⲣⲓⲕⲏ, romanized: niremenkāmi enamerika) are American citizens of Coptic descent or persons of Coptic descent residing in the United States. As of 2018, there were some 500,000 Copts living in the United States.

== Immigration history ==
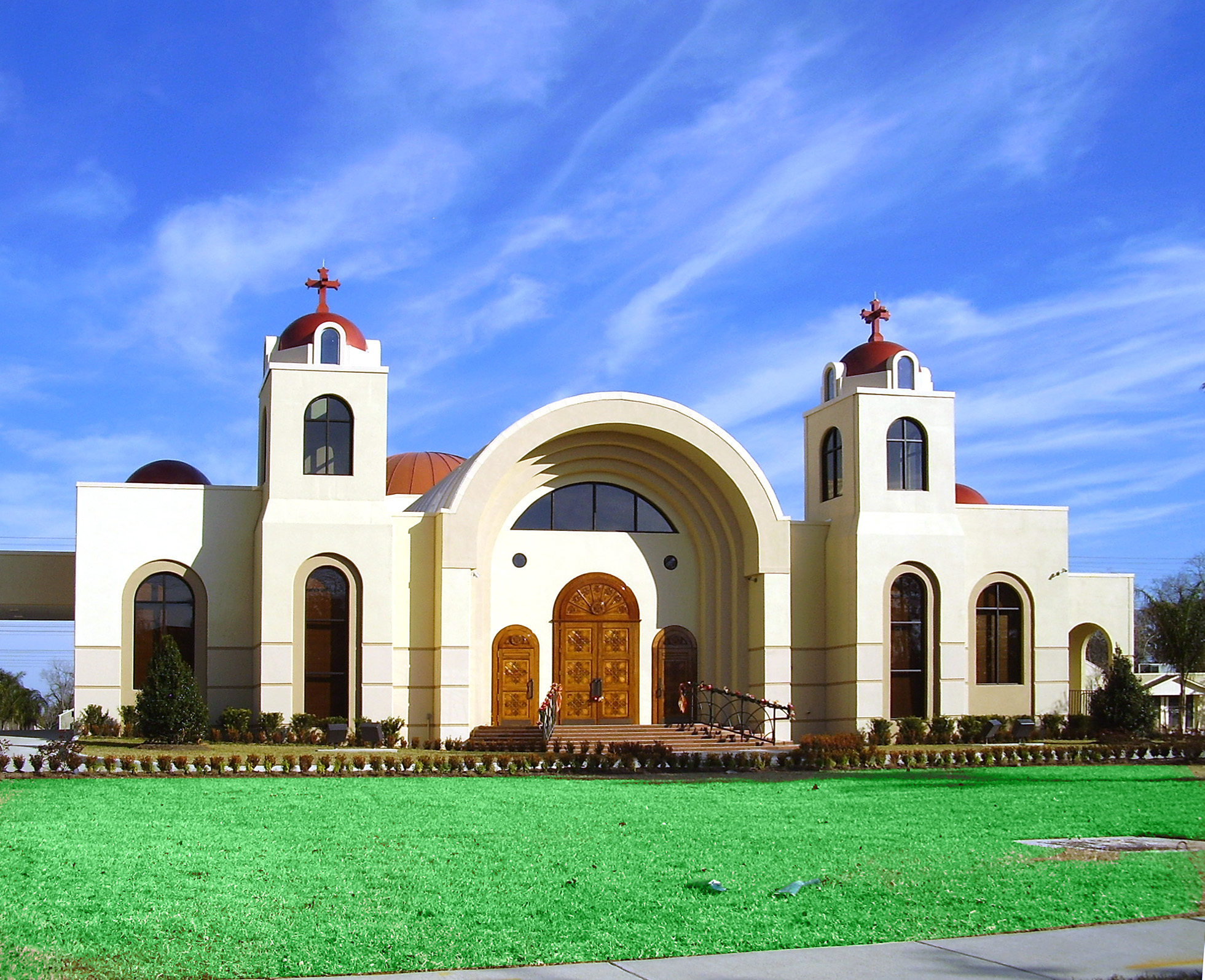
St. Mark Coptic Orthodox Church of Bellaire, Texas

The immigration of Copts to the United States started as early as the late 1940s. After 1952, the rate of Coptic immigration from Egypt to the United States because of political turmoils and revolutions. The first Coptic Orthodox church in the United States is St. Mark's Coptic Orthodox Church, which was established in the late 1960s in Jersey City.

As of 2013, researchers estimated that there were about 350,000 Coptic Christians who settled in the United States before the 2011 Egyptian revolution, with up to 100,000 additional Copts who settled in the US after the revolution, fleeing instability and violence in Egypt. Many moved to the US on grants of asylum. The new post-2011 migrants to the United States included both educated middle-class Copts and poorer, more rural Copts. As of 2018, it was estimated that a half-million Copts lived in the United States.

The historic centers of Coptic American life have been in New York, New Jersey, and Southern California.

In the 1990s, there were more than 50 Coptic congregations in the United States. By 2018, there were more than 250 Coptic congregations in the United States.

== Notable people ==
This is a list of notable Coptic Americans, including both original immigrants who obtained American citizenship and their American descendants.

- Nader Anise, founder of Coptic American Chamber of Commerce (Coptic Chamber) and attorney
- Peter Attia, physician known for his work in longevity medicine
- Halim El-Dabh, composer and ethnomusicologist
- Fadi Chehade, founder of RosettaNet
- Gamal Helal, retired interpreter and diplomat
- George Helmy, former U.S. senator from New Jersey
- Raymond Ibrahim, author and commentator
- Magdi Khalil, commentator
- Marty Makary, scientist and author, 27th commissioner of food and drugs
- Rami Malek, actor
- Reda Mankbadi, college dean and NASA scientist
- Emil Michael, businessman, former vice president of Uber
- Michael Mina, award-winning chef and restaurateur
- Dina Powell, former Deputy National Security Advisor
- Morris Sadek, attorney and activist
- Fayez Sarofim, billionaire and heir to the Sarofim family fortune
- Matthew Shenoda, poet, writer, and professor
- Bassem Youssef (FBI agent), Unit Chief in the FBI Counterterrorism Division
- Nabih Youssef, structural engineer

== See also ==
- Coptic diaspora
- Copts
- Coptic Orthodox Church in the United States
- List of Coptic Orthodox churches in the United States
  - St. Mark Coptic Orthodox Church (Jersey City, New Jersey)
  - St. Abraam Coptic Orthodox Church (Woodbury, New York)
- Coptic Canadians
- Coptic Australians
- Copts in Sudan
- Copts in Libya
- Egyptian Americans
- North Africans in the United States
