= St. Mark Coptic Orthodox Church (Jersey City, New Jersey) =

- Ϯⲉⲕ'ⲕⲗⲏⲥⲓⲁ ⳿ⲛⲣⲉⲙ⳿ⲛⲭⲏⲙⲓ ⳿ⲛⲟⲣⲑⲟⲇⲟⲝⲟⲥ ⳿ⲛⲧⲉ ⲫⲏⲉⲑⲟⲩⲁⲃ Ⲙⲁⲣⲕⲟⲥ ti.eklyseya en.remenkimi en.orthodoxos ente fi.ethowab Markos
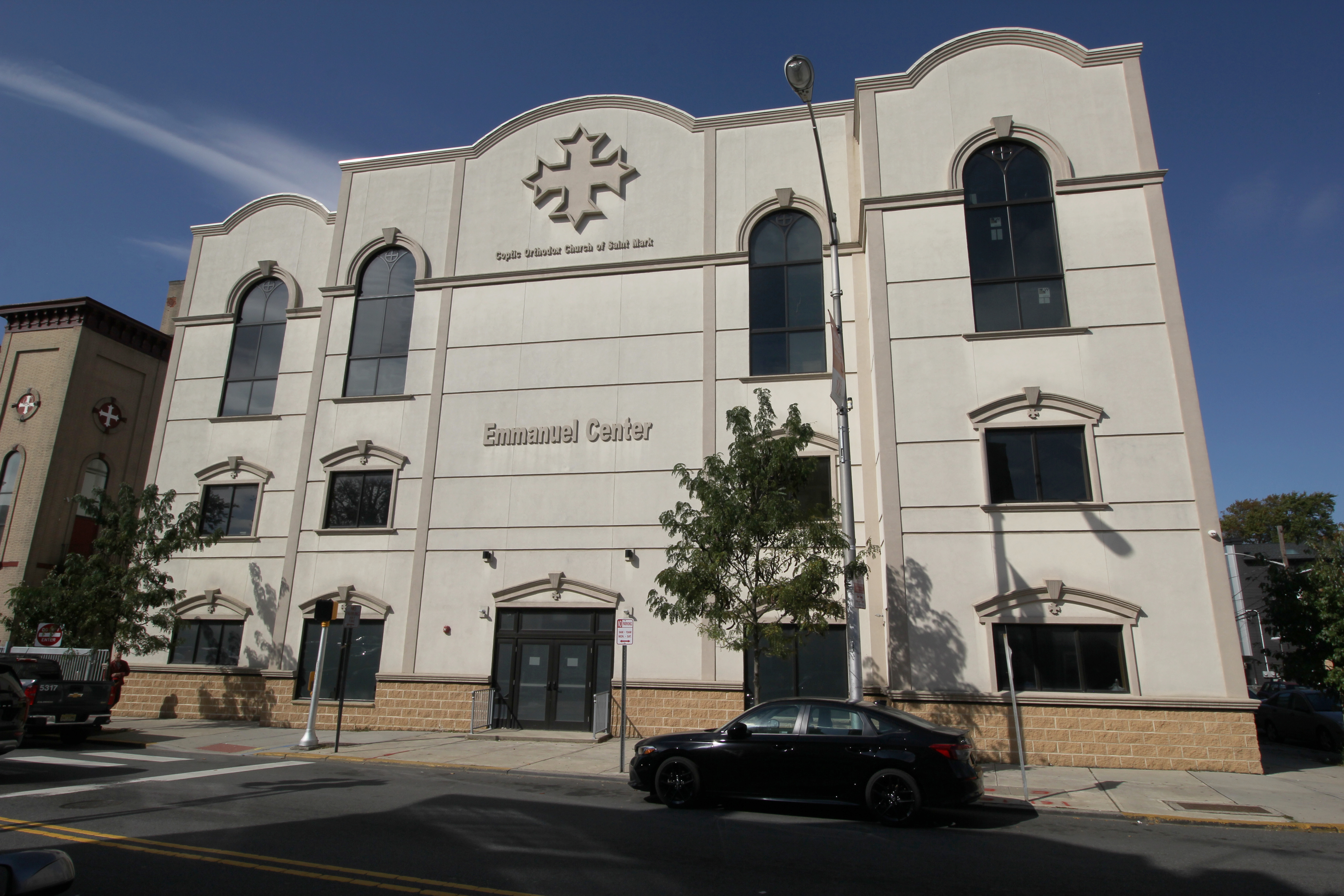

- Location in Hudson County, New Jersey St. Mark Coptic Orthodox Church (New Jersey) St. Mark Coptic Orthodox Church (the United States)
- 40.7160°N 74.0867°W
- Location: Jersey City, New Jersey
- Country: United States of America
- Denomination: Coptic Orthodox
- Website: https://www.saintmark.com/

History
- Status: Mother Church of United States
- Dedication: Mark the Apostolic

Architecture
- Functional status: Active
- Architectural type: church
- Style: Coptic

Administration
- Archdiocese: North America

Clergy
- Archbishop: Pope Tawadros II
- Priest(s): Fr. Markos Ayoub; Fr. Daniel Abdelmaseih

St Mark Coptic Orthodox Church (Coptic: Ϯⲉⲕ'ⲕⲗⲏⲥⲓⲁ ⳿ⲛⲣⲉⲙ⳿ⲛⲭⲏⲙⲓ ⳿ⲛⲟⲣⲑⲟⲇⲟⲝⲟⲥ ⳿ⲛⲧⲉ ⲫⲏⲉⲑⲟⲩⲁⲃ Ⲙⲁⲣⲕⲟⲥ // transliteration: ti.eklyseya en.remenkimi en.orthodoxos ente fi.ethowab Markos) is notably the first Coptic Orthodox parish and church building in North America, if not the Western Hemisphere, located in Jersey City, New Jersey. It is one of over 200 Coptic Orthodox Churches in the United States. The Church belongs to Archdiocese of North America.

== History ==
St. Mark's Church was first founded from the late 1960s, although the actual date of incorporation was 1970. The large influx of Copts in New Jersey can be attributed to their persecution in Egypt, in addition to those who emigrate seeking educational and financial opportunities. Currently, there are more than 30,000 Copts in Jersey City alone.

=== Expansion ===
Coptic Orthodox Christians, who adhere to an ancient Christian faith rooted in Egypt in the first century, have established a presence throughout New Jersey over the last several decades. Being the first Coptic Orthodox Church in the United States, St. Mark's in Jersey City was founded by early Egyptian immigrants. Congregations have since grown in allowing 15 other parishes in New Jersey alone.

The year 1977 marked the first pastoral visit by Pope Shenouda III to the US and Canada, including St. Mark's Church in Jersey City. Ten years later, in January 1987, the church building was newly refitted and consecrated.

=== Priests ===
St. Mark Church had several priests over the decades, including one who died in the early 1990s. The first liturgy was celebrated in St. Mark's Church on March 22, 1970, by the late Fr. Rafael Younan who was a resident priest in Montreal since 1968.

There are currently three priests that serve St. Mark's Church. Fr. Abraam Sleman was ordained as a priest on June 18, 1989, by Pope Shenouda III to serve at St. Mary Church (Ard Elgolf). Then, on September 3, 1993, Pope Shenouda chose to have him serve St. Mark Coptic Orthodox Church in Englewood, Colorado.

Rev. Gabriel Abdelsayed, who was the archpriest of St. Mark's, died in 1993. Pope Shenouda decided to replace the deceased priest with Fr. Abraam Sleman on January 5, 1995.

== Today ==
Fr. Abraam served St. Mark Church for several years up to this point. By the time Pope Shenouda III recently elevated Fr. Abraam to the rank of Archpriest (Hegomen) on September 1, 2003, Fr. Sleman was already serving alongside Fr. Markos Ayoub. On September 1, 2007, Pope Shenouda ordained Maged Abdelmaseih as Fr. Daniel Abdelmaseih, to be the third priest at St. Mark's Church. Thus, Heg. Abraam Sleman, Fr. Markos Ayoub, and Fr. Daniel Abdelmaseih have been pastors at St. Mark's Church up until the present.

There are currently about 750 Coptic American families served by St. Mark's Church.

== See also ==
- Coptic American
- Coptic Orthodox Church
- Seat of the Coptic Orthodox Pope of Alexandria
- Church of Saint Menas (Cairo)
- Coptic architecture
- Coptic Cairo
- Coptic Orthodox Cathedral of St. Mark (Cairo)
- Coptic Orthodox Church in North America
- Coptic Orthodox Church in Canada
- Coptic Orthodox Church in the United States
- Coptic Orthodox Churches
- List of Coptic Orthodox Churches in the United States
  - St. George Coptic Orthodox Church (Philadelphia)
  - St. Mark Coptic Orthodox Church (Los Angeles)
  - St. Mark Coptic Orthodox Church (Denver, Colorado)
  - St. Mary Coptic Orthodox Church (Lancaster, Pennsylvania)
  - St. Mary Coptic Orthodox Church (Los Angeles)
  - St. Mary & St. Antonios Coptic Orthodox Church (Ridgewood, Queens)
  - St. George Coptic Orthodox Church (Brooklyn)
  - St. Abraam Coptic Orthodox Church (Woodbury, New York)
  - St. George & St. Shenouda Coptic Orthodox Church (Jersey City, New Jersey)
