= St. Mark Coptic Orthodox Church (Burr Ridge, Illinois) =

Coordinates: 41°44′40.2″N 87°55′35.5″W

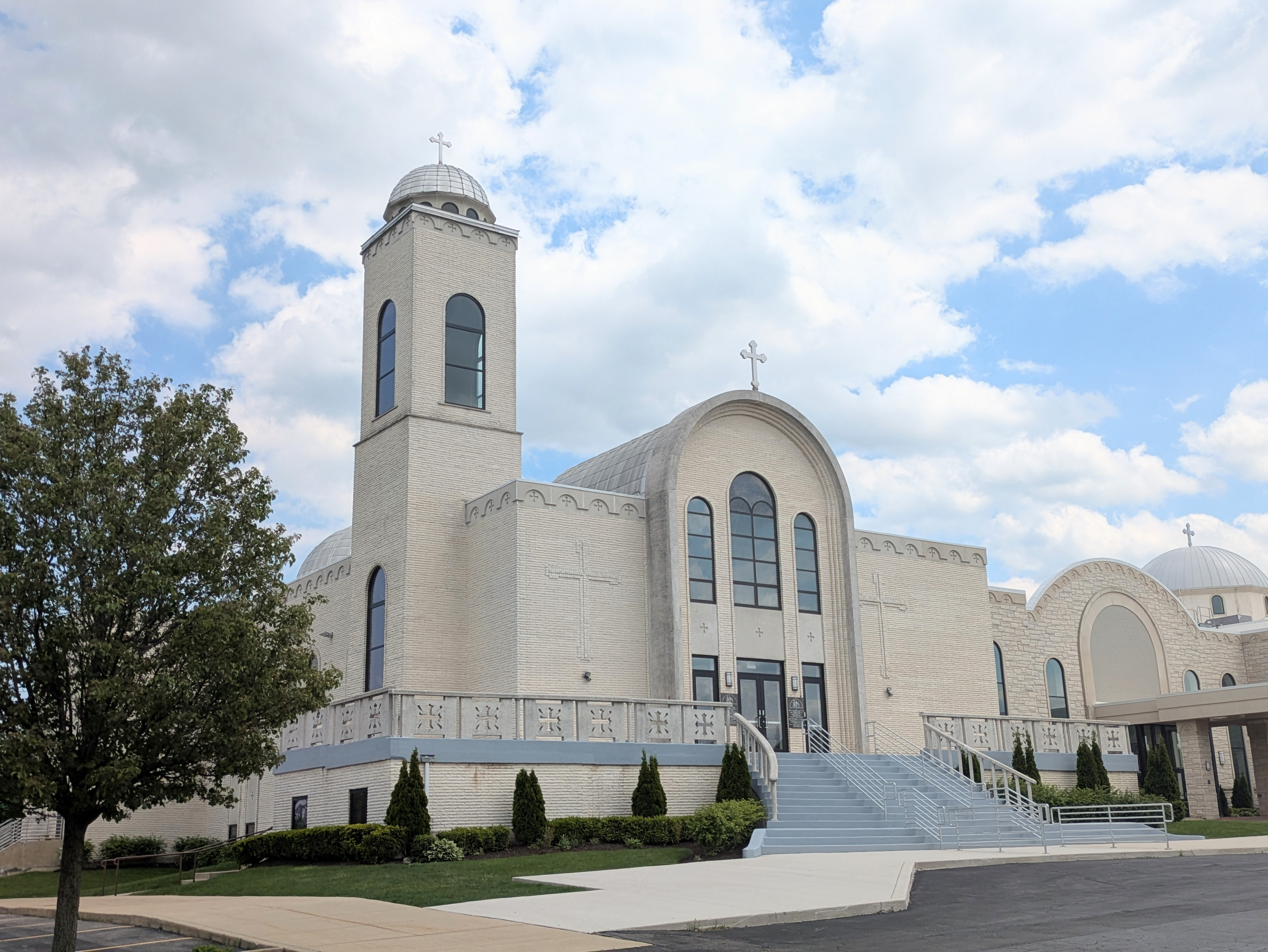
- St. Mark Coptic Orthodox Church
- Location: 15 West 455 79th Street, Burr Ridge, IL 60527
- Country: United States of America
- Language(s): English; Arabic; Coptic
- Denomination: Coptic Orthodox Church
- Website: stmarkchicago.org

History
- Founded: 1971

Architecture
- Style: Coptic
- Years built: 1982

Administration
- Division: The Coptic Orthodox Patriarchate
- Diocese: Archdiocese of North America, under the Pope of Alexandria

Clergy
- Bishop: Pope Theodoros II
- Priest(s): Fr. Samuel T. Samuel; Fr. Pavlos Fahmy; Fr. Theodore Labib; Fr. George Kaldas

St Mark Coptic Orthodox Church (Coptic: ϯⲉⲕⲕⲗⲏⲥⲓⲁ ⲉⲛⲟⲣⲑⲟⲇⲟⲝⲓⲁ ⲛⲧⲉ ⲡⲓⲁⲅⲓⲟⲥ ⲙⲁⲣⲕⲟⲥ transliteration: ti.eklyseya en.orthodoxia ente pi.agios Markos) is a Coptic Orthodox Church located in Burr Ridge, Illinois. The church is one of the largest in the Chicago area for Coptic Christians.

== Current Clergy ==
The church is served by a number of subdeacons, several deacons, and 4 priests, the newest of which being ordained in June of 2024. (See below)

Fr. Samuel T. Samuel

== History ==
St Mark Coptic Orthodox Church was built in 1982. The church was named after St. Mark, one of Jesus's Apostles who founded the original church in Egypt after Jesus' death and resurrection.

In 1994, Magdy Wilson from Alexandria, Egypt was commissioned to create new and update current icons within the church. This was Wilson's first trip to the United States and the $200,000 project completed the interior of the church, a task that had been left incomplete in 1982 due to lack of funding.

The church was visited by Pope Shenouda III of Alexandria in 2001 in order to consecrate the church. This was the main purpose of his visit to the United States and his first visit to Chicago in 24 years.

In 2015, due to the increasing church congregation, it was expanded. This addition added much to the church, most notably a new church sanctuary, dubbed “Holy Resurrection”.

== See also ==
- List of Coptic Orthodox Churches in the United States
- Mark the Evangelist
