= Silver Spring, Pennsylvania =

Unincorporated community in Pennsylvania, US

- Unincorporated community
- Location in Pennsylvania Location in the United States
- Coordinates: 40°3′51″N 76°26′13″W
- Country: United States
- State: Pennsylvania
- County: Lancaster
- Township: West Hempfield
- Time zone: UTC-5 (Eastern (EST))
  - Summer (DST): UTC-4 (EDT)
- ZIP codes: 17575

Silver Spring is an unincorporated community located in West Hempfield Township in Lancaster County, Pennsylvania, United States. The community is located along Pennsylvania Route 23.

== About the Village ==
Silver Spring has one Coptic church (Saint Mary Church). The Coptic church is one of only about six Coptic Orthodox parishes in Pennsylvania, and one of only 200 Coptic Churches in the United States.

Silver Spring's ZIP code is 17575, although, the Village is split into two zip codes (Lancaster – 17601 and Columbia – 17512) for those who do not use a post office box. Many people who live in Silver Spring actually have Rural Route Numbers as their primary postal identification.

== Recreation ==
Silver Spring has three lakes and two parks that offer recreational opportunities. Purple Lake is a small lake at the end of Purple Lake Drive. Mud Lake is a small lake located near Sycamore Dive. Grubb Lake is a 13-acre (53,000 m^{2}) lake (part of the old Chestnut Hill Iron Ore Mine) that is part of the 54-acre (220,000 m^{2}) Lake Grubb Nature Park which includes a mile-long hiking trail (of which, one-quarter mile is ADA accessible), fishing, playground, and picnic areas. The 11-acre (45,000 m^{2}) Silver Spring Park offers soccer fields, baseball and volleyball fields, playground area, and picnic areas.
