= St. George & St. Shenouda Coptic Orthodox Church (Jersey City, New Jersey) =

Coordinates: 40.7281°N 74.0674°W

St. George & St. Shenouda Coptic Church
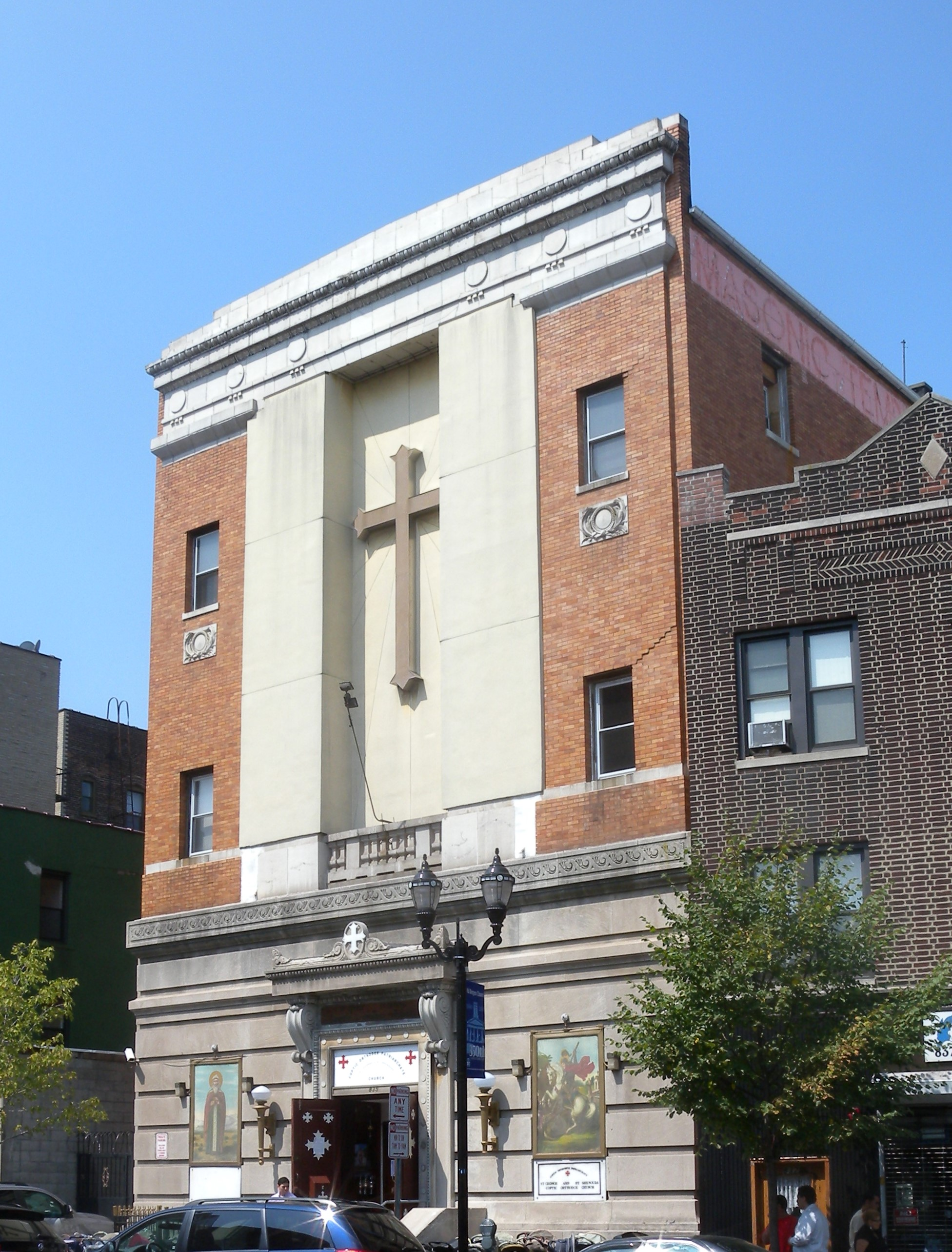
- St. George & St. Shenouda Coptic Church
- Location: 835 Bergen Ave Jersey City, NJ 07306
- Country: United States of America
- Denomination: Coptic Orthodox Church
- Website: http://www.stshenoudajc.org/

History
- Founded: 1974

Architecture
- Style: Coptic

Administration
- Division: Coptic Orthodox Patriarchate
- Diocese: Archdiocese of North America, under the Pope of Alexandria

Clergy
- Bishop: Pope Theodoros II
- Priest(s): Fr. David Bebawy; Fr. Makarius Sawirus; Fr. Anthony Basily; Fr. Thomas Nashed; Fr. David Habib; Fr. John Ibrahim

St George & St Shenouda Coptic Orthodox Church (Coptic: Ϯⲉⲕ'ⲕⲗⲏⲥⲓⲁ ⳿ⲛⲣⲉⲙ⳿ⲛⲭⲏⲙⲓ ⳿ⲛⲟⲣⲑⲟⲇⲟⲝⲟⲥ ⲫⲏⲉⲑⲟⲩⲁⲃ Ⲅⲉ⳿ⲱⲣⲅⲓⲟⲥ ⲛⲉⲙ ⲫⲏⲉⲑⲟⲩⲁⲃ Ϣⲉⲛⲟⲩϯ // transliteration: ti.eklyseya en.remenkimi en.orthodoxos ente fi.ethowab Gewargios nem fi.ethowab shenouty) is the second Coptic Orthodox church that was established in Jersey City, New Jersey. It is one of over 200 Coptic Orthodox Churches in the United States.

== History ==
Coptic Orthodox Christians, who adhere to an ancient Christian faith rooted in Egypt in the first century, have established a stronghold throughout New Jersey over the last several decades. The first Coptic Orthodox Church in the United States was St. Mark’s in Jersey City, which was founded in 1970 by Egyptian immigrants, and the congregations have since grown in allowing 15 other parishes in New Jersey alone, including St. Mark's Church in the same region of Jersey City.

The large influx of Copts in New Jersey can be attributed to their persecution in Egypt, in addition to those who emigrate seeking education and financial opportunities. Currently, there are more than 30,000 Copts in Jersey City specifically. St. George & St. Shenouda Church was first founded in 1973, although the actual date of incorporation was January 1974.

=== Priests ===
- Fr. David Bebawy - (201) 332-8369
- Fr. Makarius Sawirus - (201) 332-8369
- Fr. Anthony Basily - (201) 332-8369
- Fr. Thomas Nashed - (201) 332-8369
- Fr. David Habib - (201) 332-8369
- Fr. John Ibrahim - (201) 332-8369

=== Expansion ===
The year 1977 marked the first pastoral visit by Pope Shenouda III to the US and Canada, including both of Jersey City's two oldest churches (the only ones at the time). There are currently about 1500 Coptic families served by St. George & St. Shenouda Church alone with several others belonging to different church congregations throughout northern New Jersey in particular.

== See also ==
- Coptic Orthodox Church
- Seat of the Coptic Orthodox Pope of Alexandria
- Coptic architecture
- Coptic Cairo
- Coptic Orthodox Church in North America
  - Coptic Orthodox Church in Canada
  - Coptic Orthodox Church in the United States
  - List of Coptic Orthodox Churches in the United States
    - St. George Coptic Orthodox Church (Philadelphia)
    - St. Mark Coptic Orthodox Church (Jersey City, New Jersey)
    - St. Mary & St. Antonios Coptic Orthodox Church (Ridgewood, Queens)
    - St. George Coptic Orthodox Church (Brooklyn)
    - St. Abraam Coptic Orthodox Church (Woodbury, New York)
