= St. Mary Coptic Orthodox Cathedral =

Coptic Orthodox cathedral in Raleigh, North Carolina

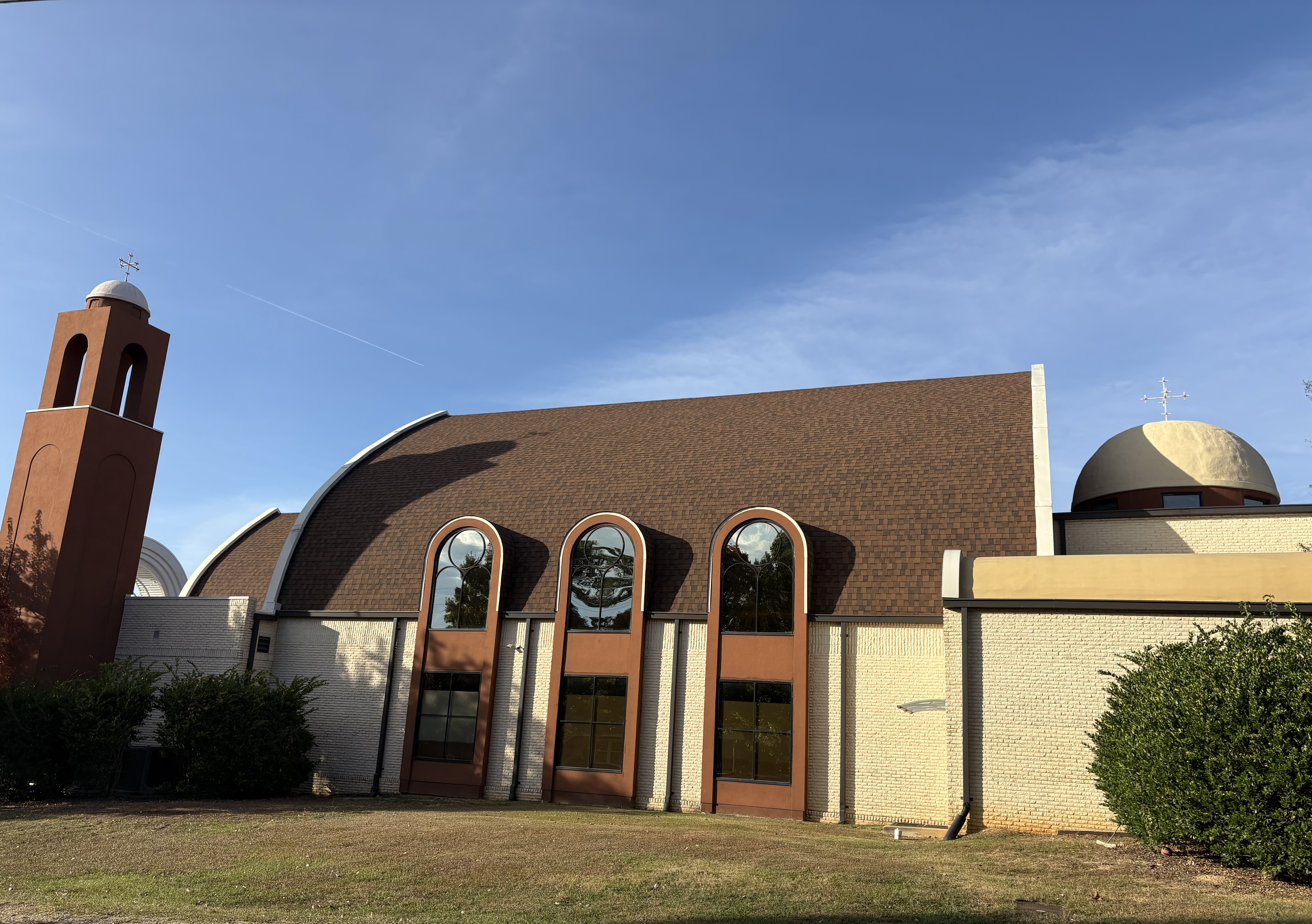
- The cathedral in 2025
- St. Mary Coptic Orthodox Cathedral
- 35.8272°N 78.5700°W
- Location: 3405 N New Hope Road; Raleigh, North Carolina
- Country: United States
- Denomination: Coptic Orthodox
- Website: www.stmarync.com

Administration
- Diocese: Diocese of North Carolina, South Carolina, and Kentucky

Clergy
- Bishop: Bishop Peter (Moses Ava Moussa)
- Rector: Hegumen Fr. Misaeil Abou El Kheir

St. Mary Coptic Orthodox Cathedral is a Coptic Orthodox cathedral in Raleigh, North Carolina. It is the cathedral for the Diocese of North Carolina, South Carolina, and Kentucky. The wooden iconostasis, painted icons, wooden walls, and altar were all brought from Egypt.

The cathedral serves as the center of Raleigh's Copt community. The grounds include a parochial school, St. Mary's Christian Academy.

The church condemned the 2017 Palm Sunday church bombings in Egypt, where some of the congregants families were affected.

In December 2018, the church won the Best of Raleigh Award in the places of worship category.
