= St. Mary Coptic Orthodox Church (Lancaster, Pennsylvania) =

Coordinates: 40.0633°N 76.4329°W

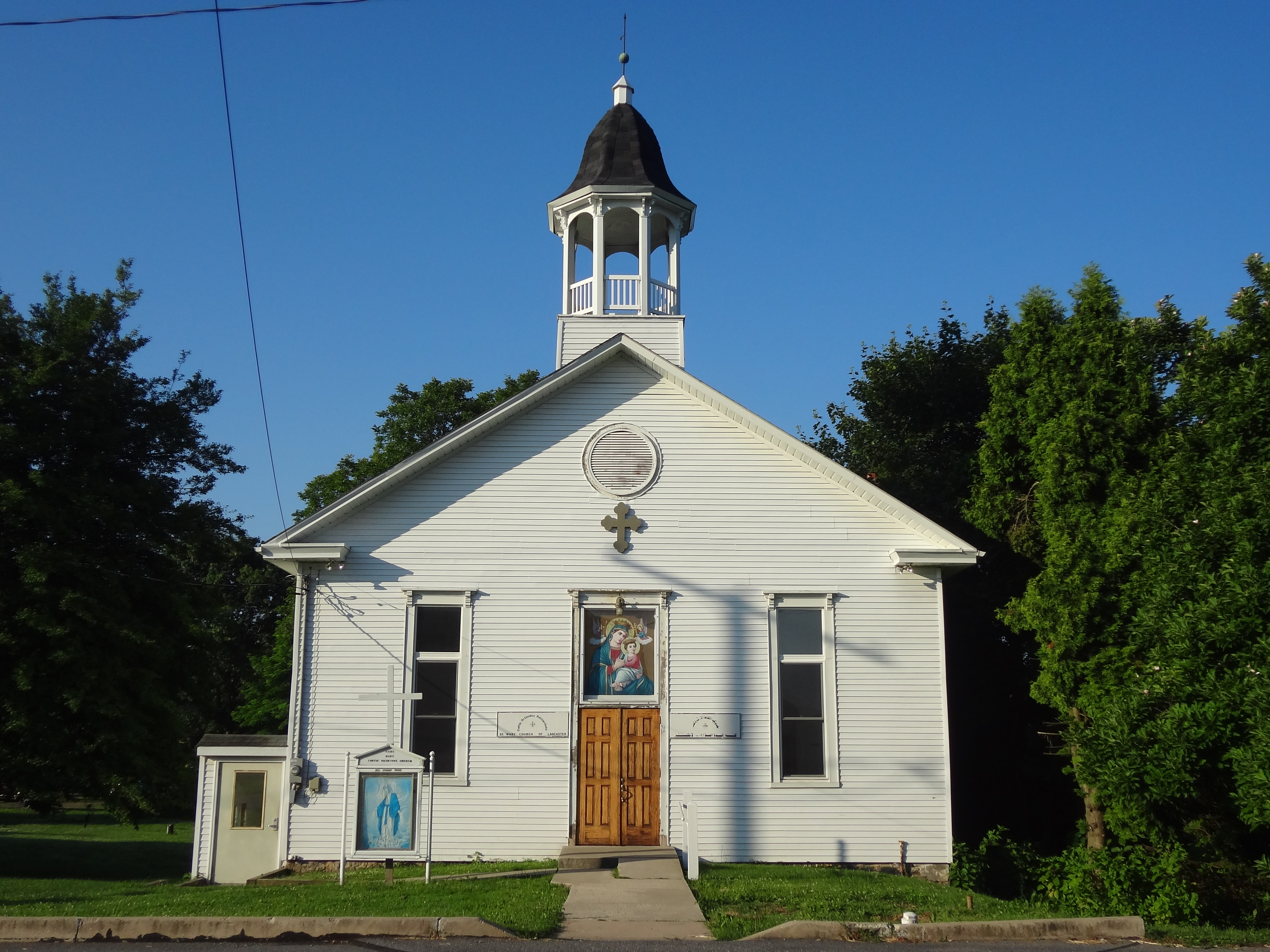
- St. Mary Coptic Orthodox Church of Lancaster, PA
- St. Mary Coptic Orthodox Church
- Location: 3602 Marietta Ave. Silver Spring, Pennsylvania 17601-1130
- Country: United States of America
- Denomination: Coptic Orthodox Church
- Website: www.stmary-lancaster.org

History
- Founded: February 1975

Architecture
- Architectural type: church
- Style: Coptic
- Years built: 1980

Administration
- Division: The Coptic Orthodox Patriarchate
- Diocese: Holy Diocese of Pennsylvania, Maryland, Delaware & West Virginia (USA), under H.G. Bishop Karas

Clergy
- Priest: Fr. Moses Fahmy

St. Mary Coptic Orthodox Church (Coptic: Ϯⲉⲕ'ⲕⲗⲏⲥⲓⲁ ⳿ⲛⲣⲉⲙ⳿ⲛⲭⲏⲙⲓ ⳿ⲛⲟⲣⲑⲟⲇⲟⲝⲟⲥ ⳿ⲛⲧⲉ ⲑⲏⲉⲑⲟⲩⲁⲃ Ⲙⲁⲣⲓⲁ // transliteration: ti.eklyseya en.remenkimi en.orthodoxos ente fi.ethowab Maria) is one of the oldest Coptic Orthodox churches established in Pennsylvania. It is one of over 200 Coptic Orthodox Churches in the US.

== History ==
St. Mary Coptic Orthodox Church is the second Coptic Orthodox church that was established in Pennsylvania, and was incorporated by 1975 with only 3 families at the time. It is located at the village of Silver Spring, Pennsylvania, a small, unincorporated town that has a relatively large proportion of Christian Orthodox Copts.

The oldest parish in Pennsylvania, which was incorporated in 1973, is St. George Coptic Orthodox Church in Norristown, Pennsylvania.

=== Expansion ===
The year 1977 marked the first pastoral visit by Pope Shenouda III to the US and Canada, including St. Mark's Church in Jersey City, the first Coptic Orthodox Church in the United States. Ten years later, in January 1987, the building of St. Mark's Church was newly refitted and consecrated.

After a time the small congregation of St. Mary's Church, with much help from the late Fouad Gad Youssef, founded the current building on Marietta Ave in 1980—with only five families at the time.

The current building of St. Mary's Church of Lancaster, as it is often known, was consecrated by a Coptic Orthodox Bishop in September 1982.

== Today ==
The Church was visited in 1989 by Pope Shenouda on his second visit (the first one being in 1977) to North America. This was the same year when the pope visited every Coptic parish in the US and Canada. Since the first two visits, Pope Shenouda visited Canada and the United States every year.

St. Mary's Church, being located in Eastern Pennsylvania that is near the large Coptic population in New Jersey, was also visited by other Bishops of the Coptic Orthodox Church.

St. Mary Church of Lancaster has grown exponentially in recent years to over 280 families, serving congregants from Lancaster, Columbia, York, and Reading.

On November 3, 2018, Fr. Moses Fahmy was ordained a priest (presbyter) by Bishop Karas (the enthroned bishop for the Coptic Orthodox Diocese of Pennsylvania, Delaware, Maryland and West Virginia) to serve the Coptic community at St. Mary church of Lancaster.

== See also ==
- Seat of the Coptic Orthodox Pope of Alexandria
- Coptic architecture
- Coptic Cairo
- Coptic Orthodox Church in North America
  - Coptic Orthodox Church in Canada
  - Coptic Orthodox Church in the United States
