= List of Coptic Orthodox churches in the United States =

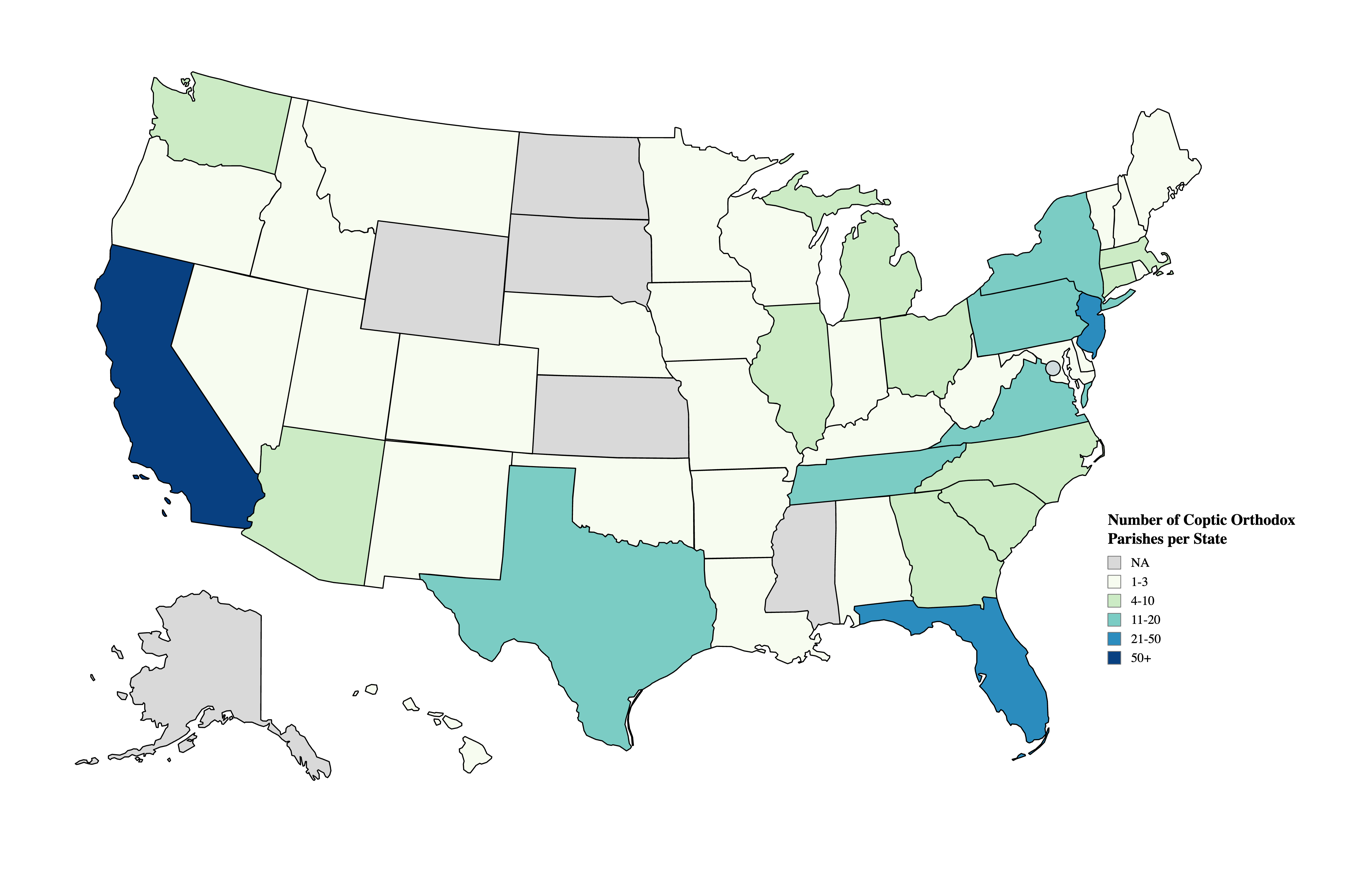
Map showing the distribution of Coptic Orthodox parishes in the United States

The following is a partial list of Coptic Orthodox churches in the United States; the count stands at more than 250 churches and communities.

== Diocese of Southern United States ==
The hierarch of this diocese is Anba Youssef. He is assisted by two general bishops, Anba Basil and Anba Gregory.

=== Alabama ===
- St. John Kame Coptic Orthodox Church, Birmingham
- Coptic Community, Mobile

=== Arizona ===
- St. Mark Coptic Orthodox Church, Scottsdale
- St. Mary Coptic Orthodox Church, Peoria
- St. John the Beloved Coptic Orthodox Church, Tucson
- St. Joseph the Carpenter Coptic Orthodox Church, Phoenix
- Coptic Community, Northern Arizona
- Archangel Michael American Coptic Orthodox Church, Paradise Valley

=== Arkansas ===
- St. George Coptic Orthodox Church, Little Rock

=== Florida ===
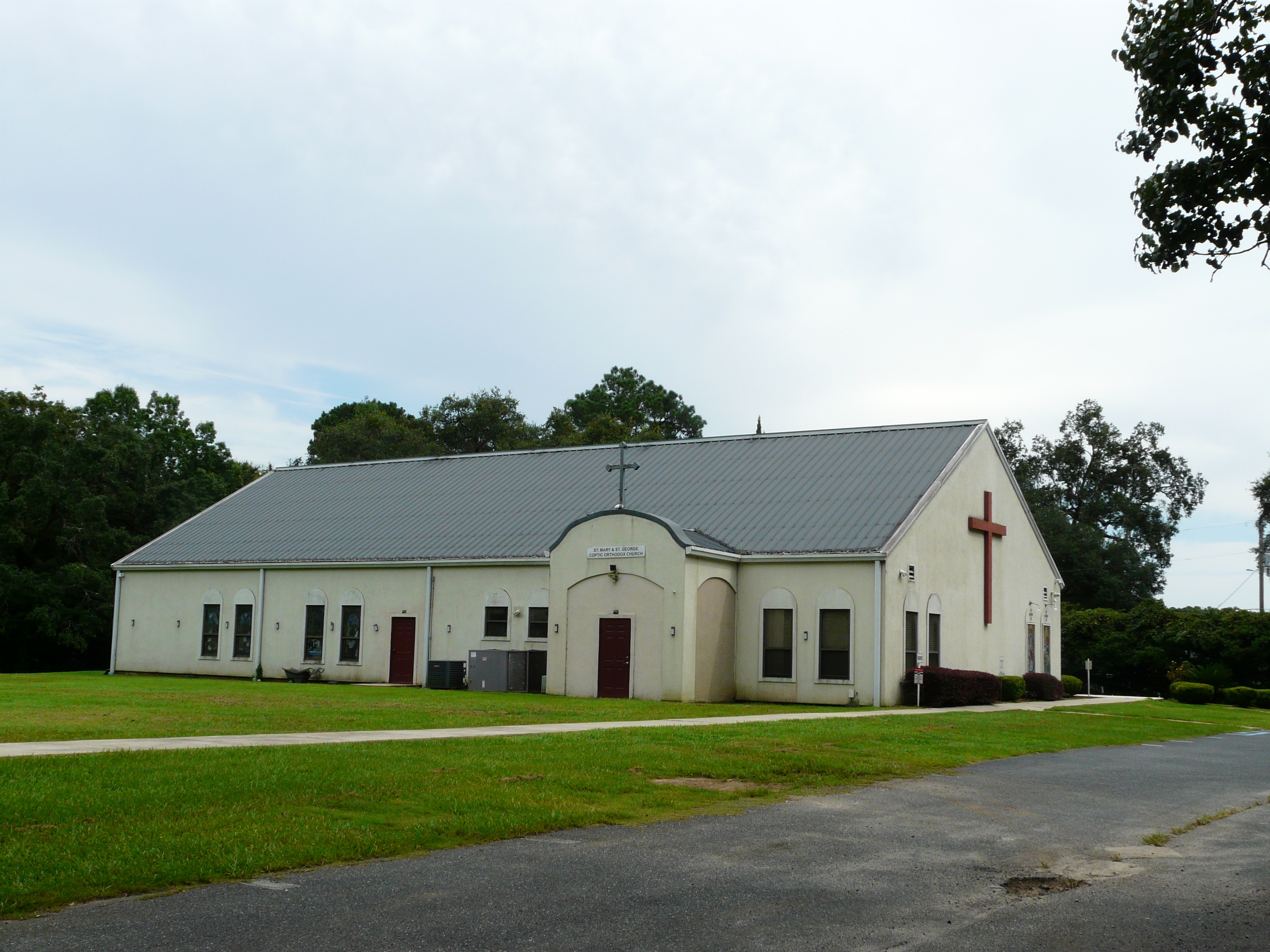
St. Mary & St. George Coptic Orthodox Church, Bradfordville, Florida

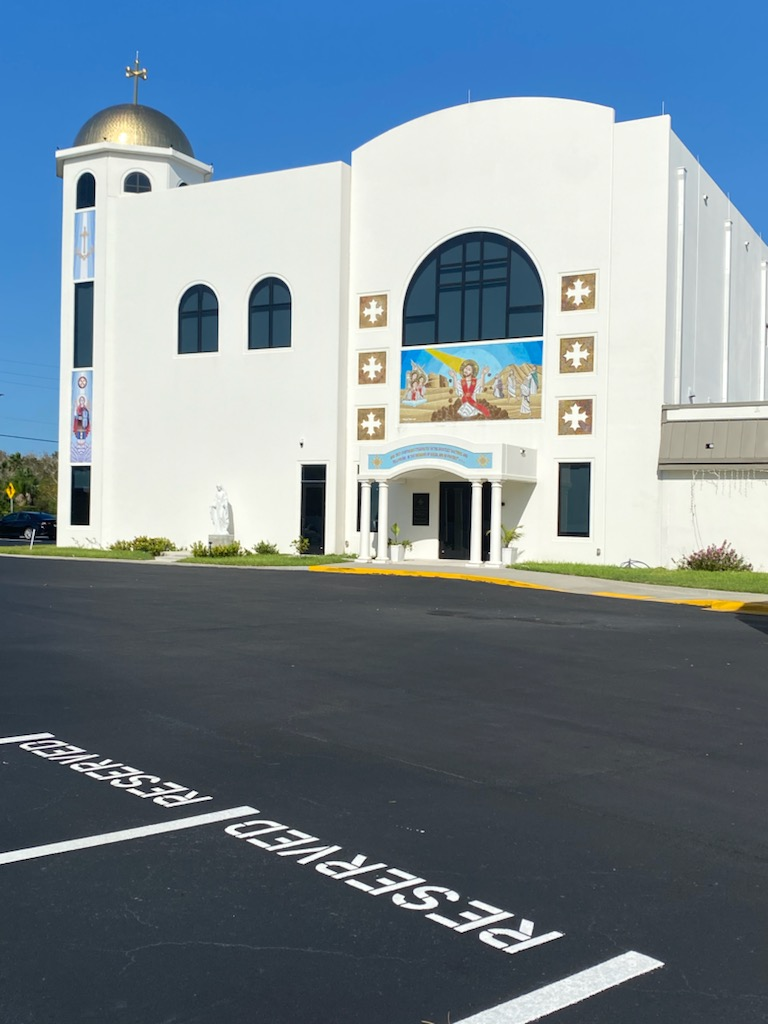
St Stephen Coptic Orthodox Retreat Center, Titusville, Florida

- Archangel Michael Coptic Orthodox Church, Melbourne
- St. Anthony Coptic Orthodox Church, Maitland
- St. Athanasius Coptic Orthodox Church, Pensacola
- St. Demiana Coptic Orthodox Church, Jacksonville
- St. George Coptic Orthodox Church, Daytona Beach
- St. George Coptic Orthodox Church, Tampa
- St. John the Baptist Coptic Orthodox Church, Miramar
- St. Mark Coptic Orthodox Church, Fort Myers
- St. Mary Coptic Orthodox Church, Delray Beach
- St. Mary & Archangel Michael Coptic Orthodox Church, Oviedo
- St. Mary & St. George Coptic Orthodox Church, Bradfordville
- St. Mary & St. Mina Coptic Orthodox Church, Clearwater
- St. Mary Magdalene Coptic Orthodox Church, Gainesville
- St. Peter Seal of the Martyrs Coptic Orthodox Church, West Palm Beach
- St. Philopateer Coptic Orthodox Church, Vero Beach
- St. Philopateer Coptic Orthodox Church, Palm Harbor, Florida
- St. Rebekah Coptic Orthodox Church, Orlando
- St. Reweis Coptic Orthodox Church, Wesley Chapel
- St. Simon the Tanner Coptic Orthodox Church, Sarasota
- St. Stephen Christian Retreat Center, Titusville
- St. Verena Coptic Orthodox Church, New Port Richey
- Coptic Community, Crystal River
- Coptic Community, Davenport
- Coptic Community, Destin
- Coptic Community, Keys
- Coptic Community, Panama City
- Coptic Community, Wildwood

=== Georgia ===
- Archangel Michael Coptic Orthodox Church, Macon
- St. Abanoub Coptic Orthodox Church, Savannah
- St. Augustine Coptic Orthodox Church, Augusta
- St. Mary Coptic Orthodox Church, Roswell
- St. Paul Coptic Orthodox Church, Suwanee
- St. Mark American Coptic Orthodox Church, Atlanta
- St. Anthony Coptic Orthodox Church, Peachtree City
- Debre Geezan Medhanealem Eritrean Orthodox Tewahdo Church, Lithonia

=== Louisiana ===
- St. Barbara Coptic Orthodox Church, Shreveport
- St. Mark Coptic Orthodox Church, New Orleans
- St. Mary of Egypt Coptic Orthodox Church, Lafayette

=== New Mexico ===
- St. Pishoy Coptic Orthodox Church, Albuquerque

=== Oklahoma ===
- St. Mary & St. Demiana Coptic Orthodox Church, Oklahoma City
- St. Peter & St. Paul Coptic Orthodox Church, Tulsa
- St. Samuel the Confessor Coptic Orthodox Church, Lawton

=== Tennessee ===
- Archangel Michael Coptic Orthodox Church, La Vergne, Tennessee 173 Cherokee Dr, La Vergne, TN 37086
- St. Athanasius Coptic Orthodox Church, Ooltewah, Tennessee 10225 Lee Hwy, Ooltewah, TN 37363
- St. George Coptic Orthodox Church, Nashville, Tennessee 2412 Foster Ave Nashville, TN 37210
- St. Mark Coptic Orthodox Church, Nashville, Tennessee 1931 Old Murfreesboro Pike, Nashville, TN 37217-3022
- St. Mary Coptic Orthodox Church, Knoxville, Tennessee 1921 Sunny Ln, Knoxville, TN 37912
- St. Mary Coptic Orthodox Church, Nashville, Tennessee 1943 Dabbs Ct, Nashville, TN 37217
- St. Mary & St. Rueis Coptic Orthodox Church, Memphis, Tennessee 501 N Mendenhall Rd, Memphis, TN 38117
- St. Mina Coptic Orthodox Church, Nashville, Tennessee 476 Mcmurray Dr, Nashville, TN 37211
- St. Pishoy Coptic Orthodox Church, Antioch, Tennessee 3183 Hamilton Church Rd, Antioch, TN 37013
- St. Philopateer Coptic Orthodox Church, Mount Juliet, Tennessee 1002 Woodridge Pl, Mt. Juliet, TN 37122-3066
- St. Abba Sarapamone Coptic Orthodox Church, Clarksville, Tennessee 1517 Madison St, Clarksville, TN 37040
- St. Karas Coptic Orthodox Church Murfreesboro, Tennessee 1207 SE Broad St., Murfreesboro, TN 37130
- St. John The Beloved Coptic Orthodox Church, Smyrna, Tennessee 851 Baker Rd, Smyrna, TN, United States, 37167
- St. Barbara Coptic Orthodox Church - Franklin, Tennessee 9577 Clovercroft Rd. Franklin, TN, 37067
- St. Verena Coptic Orthodox Church Nashville, Tennessee 5240 Edmondson Pike, Nashville, TN 3721
- St. Kyrillos the 6th Coptic Orthodox Church Antioch, Tennessee 5988 Cane Ridge Rd., Antioch, TN, 37013
- St. Joseph Coptic Orthodox Church - Nashville, Tennessee 2754 Anderson Road Nashville, TN 37217
- St. Paul the Hermit Coptic Orthodox Church Murfreesboro, Tennessee 475 John R Rice Blvd Murfreesboro, TN 37219 (temporary location)
- St. Macarius the Great Coptic Orthodox Church- Nashville, Tennessee 2255 Hobson Pike, Antioch, TN, United States, 37013
- St. Theodore Coptic Orthodox Church Goodlettsville, Tennessee 410 Brick Church Pike, Goodlettsville, TN, 37207

=== Texas ===
- Archangel Raphael Coptic Orthodox Church, Houston
- St. Mary and Archangel Michael Coptic Orthodox Church, Houston
- St. Paul Coptic Orthodox Church, Houston
- St. Abanoub Coptic Orthodox Church, Euless
- St. Anthony Coptic Orthodox Church, San Antonio
- St. Demiana Coptic Orthodox Church, San Antonio
- St. Meena Coptic Orthodox Church, Fort Worth
- St. George Coptic Orthodox Church, Arlington
- St. George Coptic Orthodox Church, Katy
- St. George Coptic Orthodox Church, Lubbock
- St. Julitta Coptic Orthodox Church, Pearland
- St. Mark Coptic Orthodox Church, Bellaire
- St. Mark Coptic Orthodox Church, Prosper
- St. Mary Coptic Orthodox Church, Colleyville (co-located with the Southern Diocese headquarters)
- St. Philopateer Coptic Orthodox Church, Richardson
- St. Stephen Coptic Orthodox Church, Cypress
- The Holy Cross Coptic Orthodox Church, Round Rock
- Coptic Community, Beaumont
- Coptic Community, College Station
- St Mary and St. Moses Abbey, Corpus Christi

== Diocese of Los Angeles, Southern California and Hawaii ==
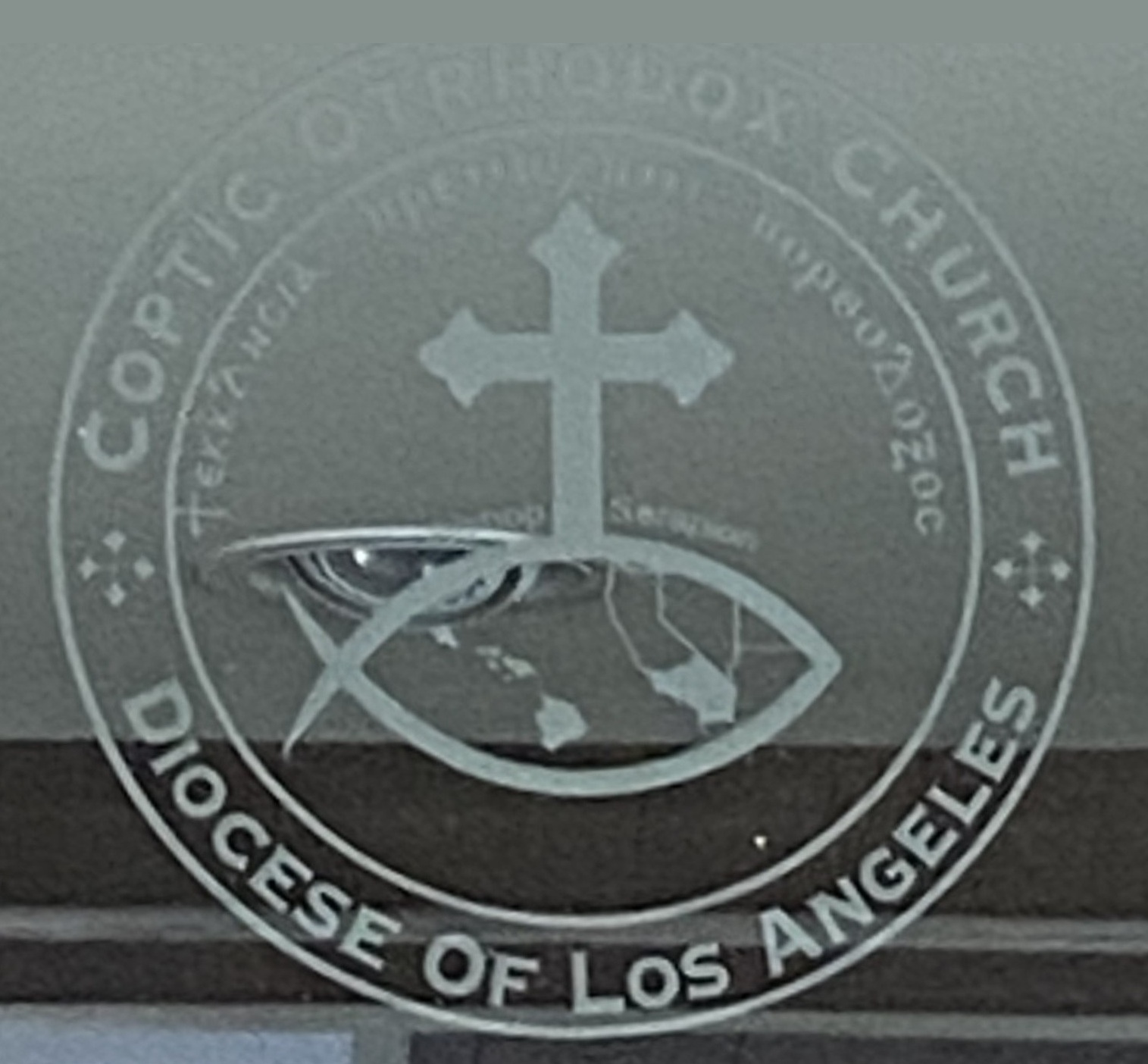
Seal of the Coptic Orthodox Church Diocese of Los Angeles

The hierarch of this diocese is Metropolitan Serapion. He is assisted by three bishops: Bishop Suriel, Bishop Abraham and Bishop Kyrillos.

=== Hawaii ===
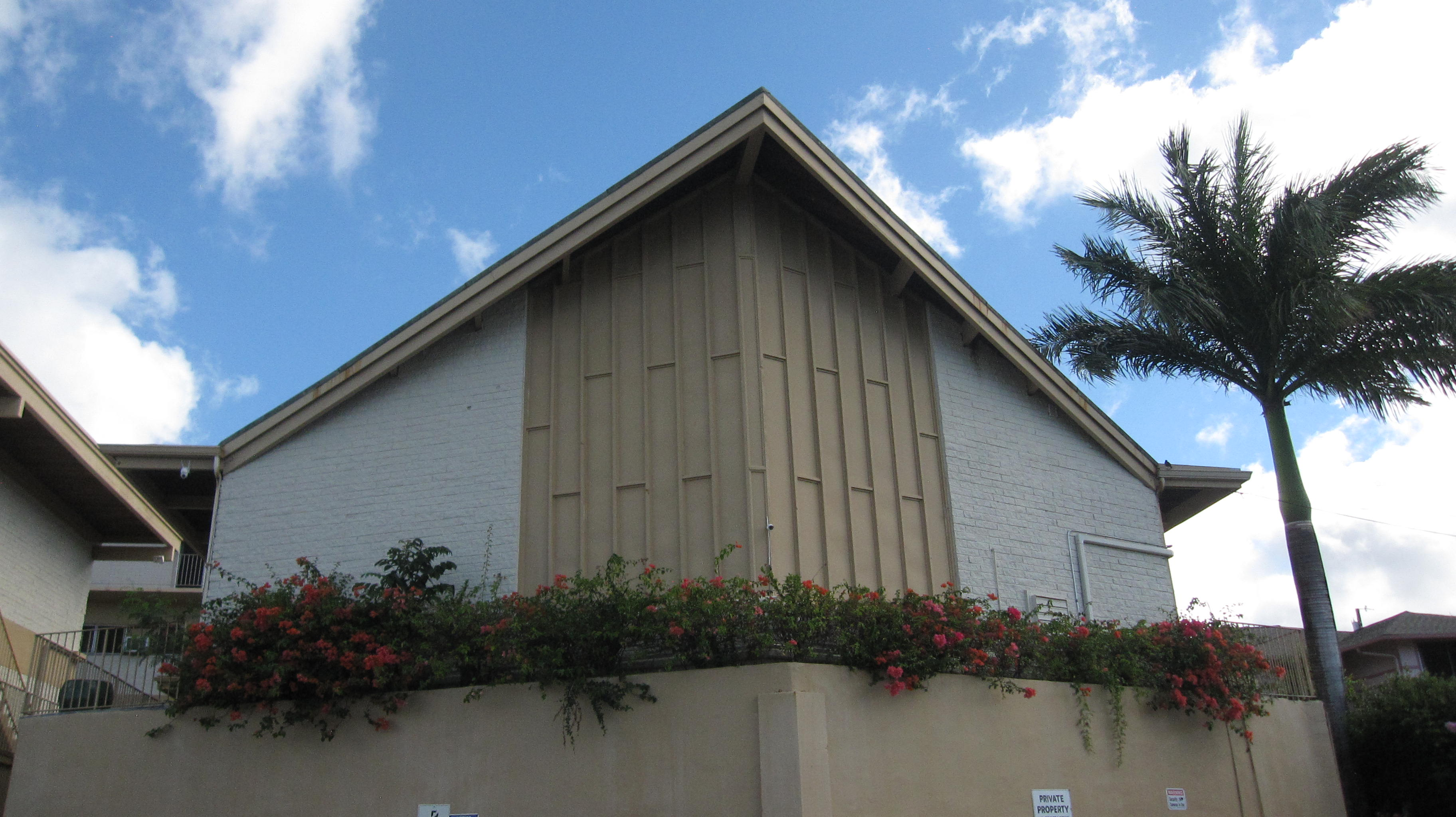
Saint Mark Coptic Orthodox Church of Honolulu

- St. Mark Coptic Orthodox Church, Honolulu

=== Southern California ===
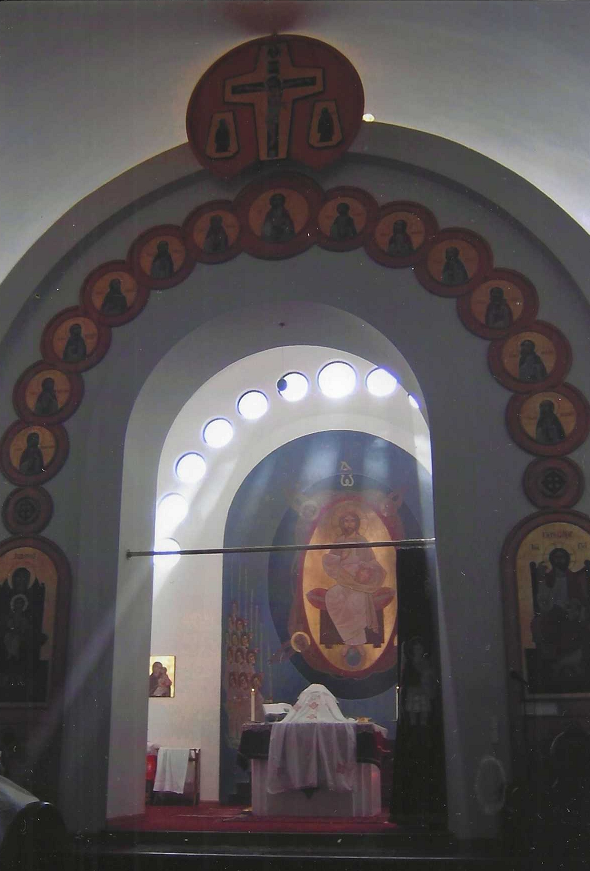
Archangel Michael Coptic Orthodox Church in Santa Ana

- Archangel Michael Coptic Orthodox Church, Santa Ana
- Archangel Michael Coptic Orthodox Church, Simi Valley
- Archangels Michael & Gabriel Coptic Orthodox Church, Fresno
- Archangel Raphael & St. Mina Coptic Orthodox Church, Palmdale
- Christ the Good Shepherd American Coptic Orthodox Church, Long Beach, California
- Christ the Redeemer American Coptic Orthodox Church, Lakewood, California
- Christ the Savior American Coptic Orthodox Church, Sherman Oaks
- Holy Annunciation Coptic Orthodox Church, Hawthorne
- Holy Cross Coptic Orthodox Church, Escondido
- Holy Coptic Martyrs Coptic Orthodox Church, Moreno Valley
- Holy Nativity Coptic Orthodox Church, Riverside
- Holy Resurrection American Coptic Orthodox Church, Los Angeles
- Holy Transfiguration Coptic Orthodox Church, Chino
- Holy Virgin Mary & St. Bishoy Coptic Orthodox Church, Los Angeles
- St. Abanoub & St. Anthony Coptic Orthodox Church, Norco
- St. Anthony Coptic Orthodox Monastery, Newberry Springs
- St. Basil American Coptic Orthodox Church, San Diego
- St. Bishoy & St. Paul Coptic Orthodox Church, Los Angeles
- St. Cyril of Alexandria Coptic Orthodox Church, Irwindale
- St. Demiana Coptic Orthodox Church, Bakersfield
- St. Demiana Coptic Orthodox Church, San Diego
- St. George Coptic Orthodox Church, Bellflower
- St. George & St. Bishoy Coptic Orthodox Church, Visalia
- St. George the New Martyr Coptic Orthodox Church, Hemet
- St. Gregory the Theologian American Coptic Orthodox Church, Anaheim
- St. John Coptic Orthodox Church, Covina
- St. John Chrysostom American Coptic Orthodox Church, Laguna Niguel
- St. John the Baptist Coptic Orthodox Church, Oxnard
- St. Justina Coptic Orthodox Church, Rancho Cucamonga
- St. Macarius the Great Coptic Orthodox Church, Santa Maria
- St. Marina Coptic Orthodox Church, Irvine
- St. Mark Coptic Orthodox Church, Los Angeles
- St. Mary Coptic Orthodox Church, Victorville
- St. Mary & St. Athanasius Coptic Orthodox Church, Northridge
- St. Mary & St. Verena Coptic Orthodox Church, Yorba Linda
- St. Mary Magdalene Coptic Orthodox Church, Palm Desert
- St. Mary of Egypt Coptic Orthodox Church, Newhall
- St. Maurice & St. Verena Coptic Village Retreat Center, Big Bear Lake
- St. Maurice Coptic Orthodox Church, Pomona
- St. Mercurius & St. Abraam Coptic Orthodox Church, Torrance
- St. Mina Coptic Orthodox Church, Colton
- St. Paul American Coptic Orthodox Church, Tustin
- St. Peter & St. Paul Coptic Orthodox Church, Santa Monica
- St. Pope Kyrillos VI Coptic Orthodox Church, Westminster
- St. Thomas the Hermit Coptic Orthodox Church, Temecula
- St. Verena & The Three Holy Youth Coptic Orthodox Christian Center, Orange

== Diocese of New York & New England ==
The hierarch of this diocese is Anba David.

=== Connecticut ===
- Virgin Mary & Archangel Michael Coptic Orthodox Church, Hamden
- St. Peter & St. Andrew Coptic Orthodox Church, Stamford
- Coptic Community, Waterbury
- Coptic Community, Waterford

=== Maine ===
- St. Karas and St. Pishoy, Bangor

=== Massachusetts ===
- Holy Virgin Mary Spiritual Vineyard, Charlton
- St. Mark Coptic Orthodox Church, Natick
- St. Mary & St. George Coptic Orthodox Church, Marshfield
- St. Shenouda & St. Karas Coptic Orthodox Church, Uxbridge
- St. Paul and St. John Chrysostom Coptic Orthodox Church, Boston
- St. Philopateer and St. Mina Coptic Orthodox Church, Wayland
- The Holy Family Coptic Orthodox Church, Attleboro

=== New Hampshire ===
- St. Mary and Archangel Michael, Nashua, New Hampshire

=== New York ===
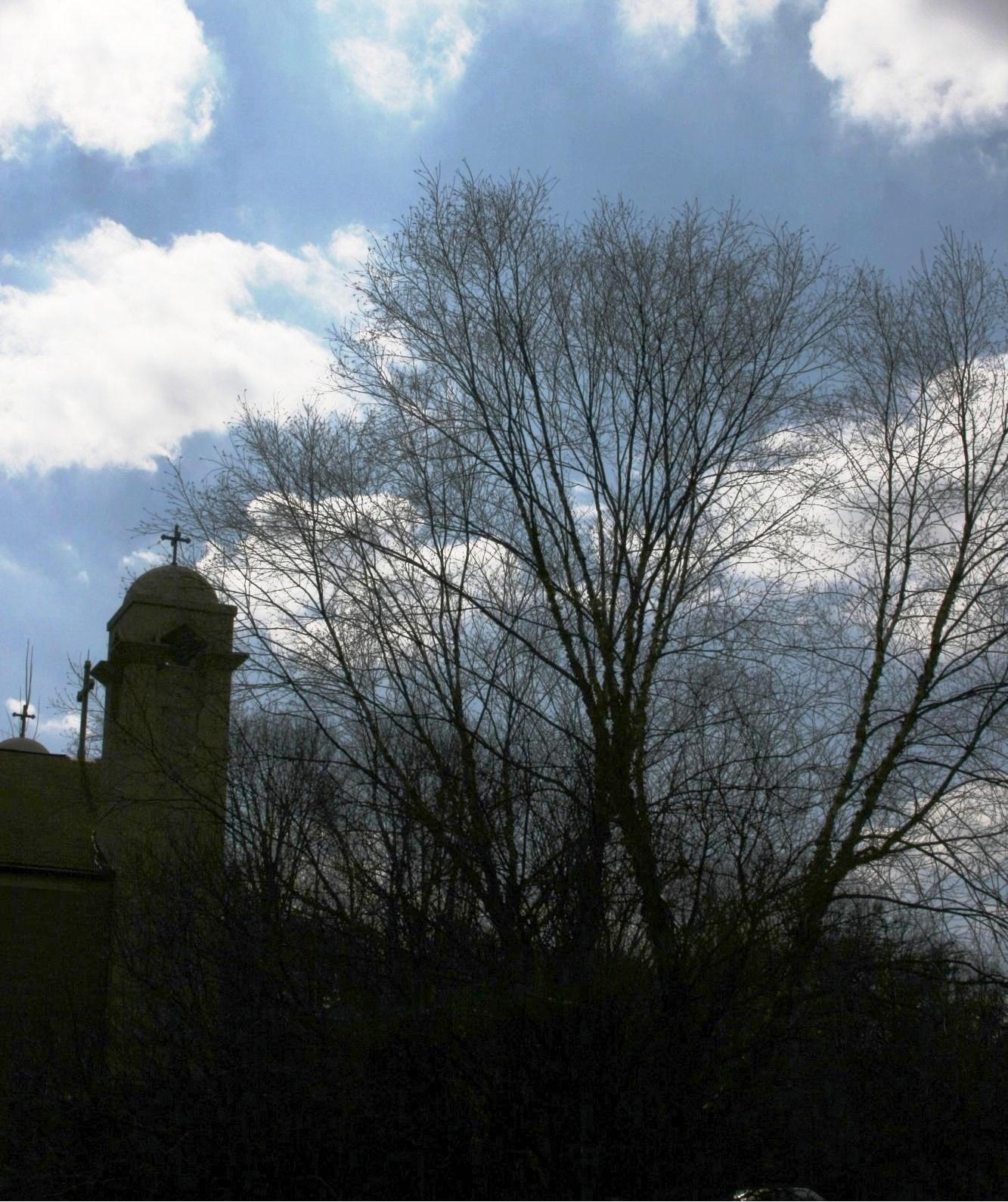
A view of St. Abraam's Church on Long Island from outside

- Archangel Michael & St. Mena Coptic Orthodox Church, Great Kills (Staten Island)
- St. George Coptic Orthodox Church, Astoria (Queens)
- St. George Coptic Orthodox Church, Brooklyn
- St. Helena & St. Anasimone Coptic Orthodox Church, Flushing
- St. Luke Coptic Orthodox Church, New Hyde Park, NY
- St. Mark Coptic Orthodox Church, Manhattan
- St. Mark Coptic Orthodox Church, West Henrietta
- St. Mark & St. Abraam Coptic Orthodox Church, Woodbury (Long Island)
- St. Mary & St. Antonios Coptic Orthodox Church, Ridgewood (Queens)
- St. Mary & St. Demiana Coptic Orthodox Church, White Plains
- St. Mary & St. George Coptic Orthodox Church, Albany
- St. Mary & St. Mina Coptic Orthodox Church, Syracuse
- St. Mary & St. Moses the Black Coptic Orthodox Church, North Tonawanda
- St. Peter & St. Paul Coptic Orthodox Mission, Rochester
- St. Shenouda Monastery, West Henrietta
- Virgin Mary & St. George Coptic Orthodox Church, Tottenville (Staten Island)
- Virgin Mary & St. Pachomious Coptic Orthodox Church, Stony Point (Rockland County)

=== Rhode Island ===
- St. Mary and St. Mena Coptic Orthodox Church, Cranston

=== Vermont ===
- St. Mary & Archangel Raphael Coptic Orthodox Church, Burlington

== Diocese of North Carolina, South Carolina, and Kentucky ==
The hierarch of this diocese is Anba Peter.

=== North Carolina ===
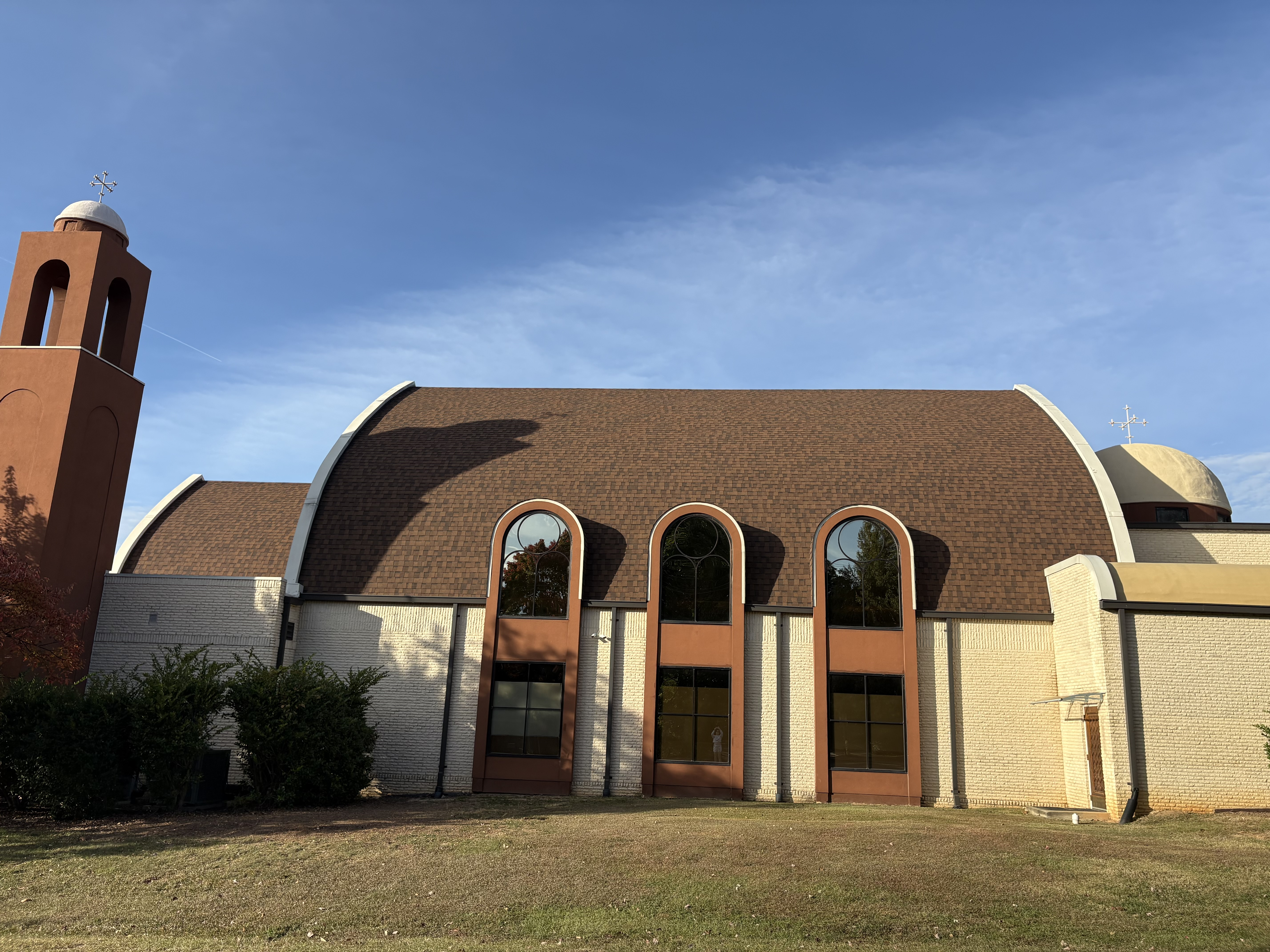
St. Mary Coptic Orthodox Cathedral in Raleigh.

- Archangel Michael & St. Philopateer Coptic Orthodox Church, Winston-Salem
- Archangel Raphael & St. John the Beloved Coptic Orthodox Church, Chapel Hill
- St. Mark Coptic Orthodox Church, Charlotte
- St. Mary Coptic Orthodox Cathedral, Raleigh
- St. Paul American Coptic Orthodox Church, Cary
- St. Pishoy and Pope Kerillos Coptic Orthodox Church, Reidsville

=== South Carolina ===
- Archangel Michael Coptic Orthodox Church, Greenville
- St. Mark Coptic Orthodox Church, Myrtle Beach
- St. Mary Coptic Orthodox Church, Mauldin
- St. Mary & St. George Coptic Orthodox Church, Charleston
- St. Mary & St. Mina Coptic Orthodox Church, Fort Mill

=== Kentucky ===
- St. Shenouda & St. Abraam Coptic Orthodox Church, Bowling Green
- Holy Virgin Mary & St. Philopateer Coptic Orthodox Church, Lexington
- St. Mark Coptic Orthodox Church, Louisville

== Diocese of Pennsylvania, Maryland, Delaware and West Virginia ==
The hierarch of this diocese is Anba Karas.

=== Pennsylvania ===
- St. Anthony Coptic Orthodox Church, Annville
- St. George Coptic Orthodox Church, Norristown (Philadelphia)
- St. Mark Coptic Orthodox Church, Harrisburg
- St. Mary Coptic Orthodox Church, Ambridge
- St. Mary Coptic Orthodox Church, Silver Spring
- St. Mary & St. Bishoy Coptic Orthodox Church, Allentown
- St. Mary & St. Joseph Coptic Orthodox Church, Levvittown
- St. Mary & St Kyrillos Coptic Orthodox Church, Hatfield
- St. Mary & St. Mercurios Coptic Orthodox Church, Devon
- Virgin Mary & St. Marina Coptic Orthodox Church, Mount Pocono
- St. Mina & Pope Kyrillos Coptic Orthodox Church, Carlisle
- St. Monica & Saint Augustine Coptic Orthodox Church, [Elizabethtown, Pennsylvania].

=== Maryland ===
- St. Barnabas & St. Susanna Coptic Orthodox Church, Baltimore
- St. Mary Coptic Orthodox Church, Cooksville

=== Delaware ===
- Saint Mary Coptic Orthodox Church Of Delaware, Newark

=== West Virginia ===
- St. Mary & Archangel Gabriel Coptic Orthodox Church, Charleston

== Diocese of Ohio, Michigan and Indiana ==
The hierarch of this diocese is Anba Seraphim.

=== Ohio ===
- St. George Coptic Orthodox Church, Waterville (Toledo)
- St. Mark Coptic Orthodox Church, Seven Hills (Cleveland)
- St. Mary Coptic Orthodox Church, Columbus
- St. Mary & St. John Convent, Warren
- St. Mina & St. Abanoub Coptic Orthodox Church, Miamisburg (Dayton)
- St. Peter & St. George Coptic Orthodox Church, Westlake (Cleveland)

=== Michigan ===
- St. Mark Coptic Orthodox Church, Troy
- St. Mary & St. Philopateer Coptic Orthodox Church, Troy
- St. Mina & Pope Kyrillos VI Coptic Orthodox Church Shelby Township
- St. Mary & Pope Kyrillos VI Coptic Orthodox Church Fraser
- Holy Cross Coptic Orthodox Church, Farmington Hills
- St. Mina Coptic Orthodox Church, Mio
- St. Mary Coptic Orthodox Church, Ann Arbor
- St. Mary & St. Mina Coptic Orthodox Church, Grand Rapids
- The Coptic Orthodox Community of Lansing

=== Indiana ===
- St. Mary & St. Mark Coptic Orthodox Church, Indianapolis

== Diocese of Northern California and the Pacific Northwest ==
=== California ===
- St. Antonius Coptic Orthodox Church, Hayward
- St. George & St. Joseph Coptic Orthodox Church, Campbell (San Jose)
- St. Mark Coptic Orthodox Church, Monterey
- St. Mark Coptic Orthodox Church, Ripon (Modesto)
- St. Mary Coptic Orthodox Church, Roseville (Sacramento)
- St. Mary & St. John Coptic Orthodox Church, Pleasanton
- St. Mary & St. Mina Coptic Orthodox Church, Concord

=== Washington ===
- St. George Coptic Orthodox Church, Kirkland
- St. Mary Coptic Orthodox Church, Lynnwood
- St. Mark Coptic Orthodox Church, Bonney Lake
- St. Mina and Pope Kyrillos VI Coptic Orthodox Church, Bothell
- St. Philopater & St. Demiana Coptic Orthodox Church, Lynnwood
- Archangels Coptic Orthodox Church, Everett
- St. Mary and St. Abanoub Coptic Orthodox Church, Tri-Cities

=== Oregon ===
- St. Antonious Coptic Orthodox Church, Portland
- St. Mary & Martyr Marina Coptic Orthodox Church Gresham

== Archdiocese of North America ==
This archdiocese is directly under the responsibility of the Pope of Alexandria. It includes all churches in North America that are not under the jurisdiction of a diocese. There is an Exarch of the Throne and one General Bishop serving this archdiocese, who is directly under the responsibility of the Pope of Alexandria:

- Anba Michael, Suffragan Bishop of the Holy Suffragan Diocese of Alexandria and all Virginia, USA; suffragan to the Archdiocese of North America, which is currently under Patriarchal jurisdiction.

The following churches are under the jurisdiction of the Archdiocese of North America:

=== Colorado ===
- St. Mark Coptic Orthodox Church, Centennial (Denver)

=== Idaho ===
- Virgin Mary & St. Mark Coptic Orthodox Church, Boise

=== Illinois ===
- St. Mary Coptic Orthodox Church, Palatine (Chicago)
- St. Mark Coptic Orthodox Church, Burr Ridge
- St. George Coptic Orthodox Church,(Monee, Illinois), (Chicago)
- St. Paul Coptic Orthodox Mission Church, (Chicago)
- St. Mina & St. Pope Kyrillos VI Coptic Orthodox Church, (Urbana)

=== Iowa ===
- St. Mary Coptic Orthodox Church, 954 Cummins Pkwy (Des Moines)
- Coptic Community, Burlington
- St. Mary & St. George Coptic Orthodox Church, Council Bluffs (former location; while the building still exists and is still owned by the Coptic Orthodox Church, services have been moved to a new building in Omaha, Nebraska)

=== Maryland ===
- St. George Coptic Orthodox Church, Cabin John

=== Minnesota ===
- St. Mary Coptic Orthodox Church, South St. Paul
- St. George Coptic Orthodox Church, Plymouth

=== Missouri ===
- St. Mary & St. Abraam Coptic Orthodox Church, St. Louis

=== Montana ===
- St. Mary & St. Karas, Billings

=== Nebraska ===
- St. Mary & St. George Coptic Orthodox Church, Omaha (formerly located in Council Bluffs, Iowa, the Church has recently moved its services to a new building constructed in Omaha to be closer to its members and abide more fully with its archdiocesan designation as the Coptic Orthodox Church in Omaha)

=== Nevada ===
- St. Mary Coptic Orthodox Church, Las Vegas

=== New Jersey ===
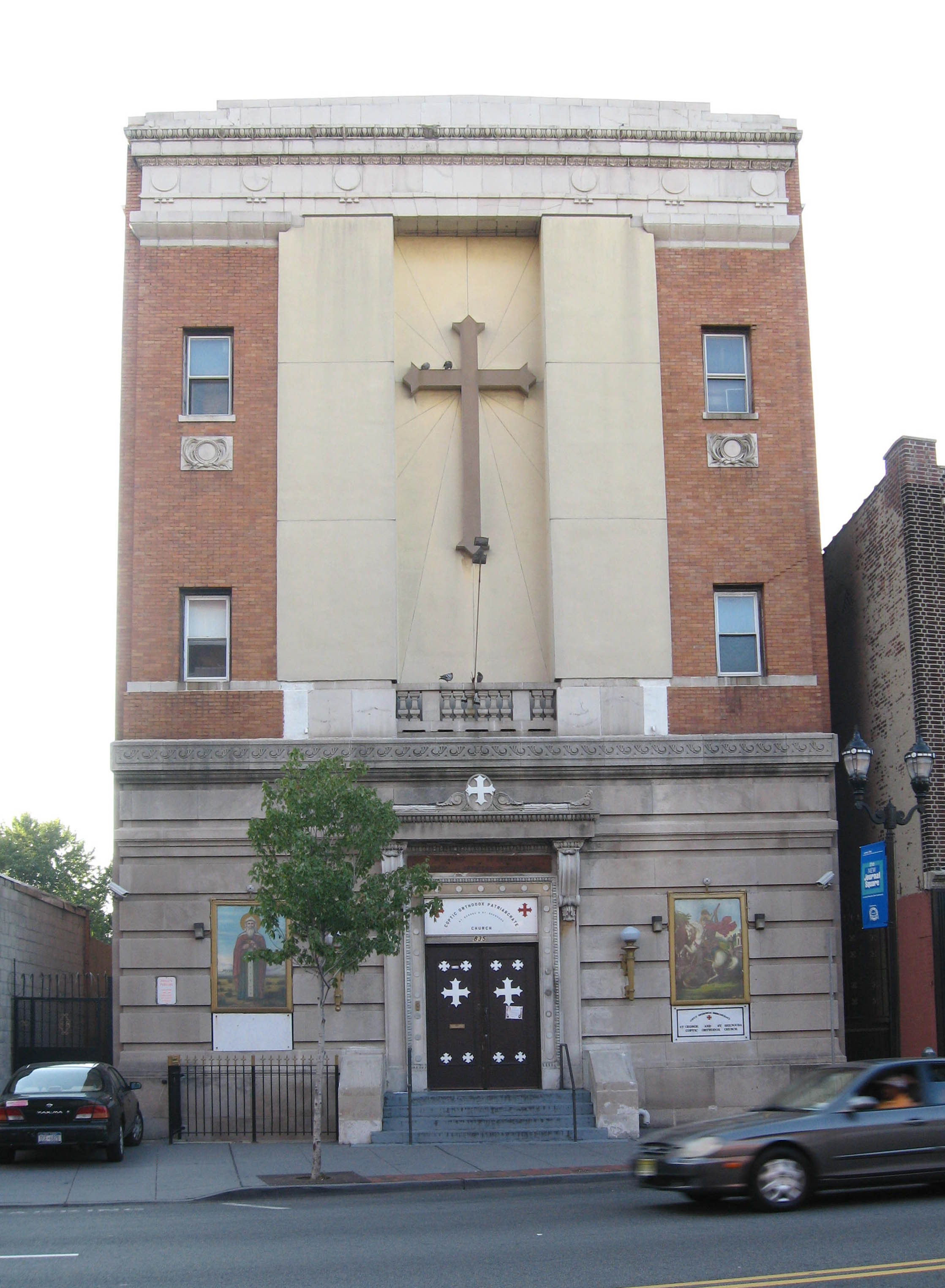
The current building of St. George & St. Shenouda Coptic Orthodox Church, which was originally established as the second Coptic Orthodox Church in Jersey City.

- Anba Moussa the Strong & St. Abraam Coptic Orthodox Church, Piscataway Township
- Archangel Michael Coptic Orthodox Church, Howell Township
- David the Prophet & St. Karas Coptic Orthodox Church, Franklin Lakes
- Pope Kyrillos VI and Archdeacon Habib Girgis Coptic Orthodox Church, Washington Township
- Queen St. Mary & Prince Tadros I Coptic Orthodox Church, Spotswood
- St. Abanoub & St. Antonious Coptic Orthodox Church, Bayonne
- St. Anianus Coptic Orthodox Church, Princeton
- St. Anthony Coptic Orthodox Church, Medford
- St. Antonious & St. Mina Coptic Orthodox Church, East Rutherford
- St. Augustine & St. Monica Coptic Orthodox Church, Summit
- St. George & St. Shenouda Coptic Orthodox Church, Jersey City
- St. John & St. Mary Magdalene Coptic Orthodox Church, Morris Plains
- St. Mark Coptic Orthodox Church, Cedar Grove
- St. Mark Coptic Orthodox Church, Jersey City
- St. Mary Coptic Orthodox Church, East Brunswick
- St. Mary & St. Athanasius Coptic Orthodox Church, Hillsborough Township
- St. Mary & St. Bishoy Coptic Orthodox Church, Elizabeth
- St. Mary & St. Mercurius Coptic Orthodox Church, Belleville
- St. Mary & St. Paula Coptic Orthodox Church, Barnegat Township
- St. Mary & St. Stephen Coptic Orthodox Church, South River
- St. Mary, St. Shenouda, & St. Thomas Coptic Orthodox Church, Hamilton Township
- St. Mina Coptic Orthodox Church, Holmdel Township
- St. Paul Coptic Orthodox Church, McKee City
- Virgin Mary & St. John Coptic Orthodox Church, Bayonne
- St. Mary and Archangel Raphael Coptic Orthodox Church, Old Bridge Township
- St. Mary Of Egypt and St. Timothy The Apostle Coptic Orthodox Church, Cranbury

=== Pennsylvania ===
- St. Mina Coptic Orthodox Church, Altoona

=== Utah ===
- St. Mary Coptic Orthodox Church, Salt Lake City

=== Virginia ===
- Archangel Michael & St. Anthony Coptic Orthodox Church, Richmond
- St. Abanoub Coptic Orthodox Church, Springfield
- St. Mary and St. Abraam Coptic Orthodox Church, Virginia Beach
- St. George Coptic Orthodox Church, Hampton
- St. Joseph the Carpenter Coptic Orthodox Church, Gainesville
- St. Marina Coptic Orthodox Church, Winchester
- St. Mark Coptic Orthodox Church, Fairfax
- St. Mary Coptic Orthodox Church, Roanoke
- St. Mary Coptic Orthodox Church, Yorktown
- St. Mary & St. John the Baptist Coptic Orthodox Church, Staunton
- St. Mary & St. Mercurius Coptic Orthodox Church, Stafford
- St. Mina & St. Pope Kyrillous Coptic Orthodox Church, Moseley
- St. Moses Coptic Orthodox Church, Ashburn
- St. Philopateer Coptic Orthodox Church, Fairfax
- St. Pope Kyrillos Coptic Orthodox Church, Chantilly
- St. Timothy & St. Athanasius Coptic Orthodox Church, Arlington

=== Wisconsin ===
- St. Mary & St. Anthony Coptic Orthodox Church, Milwaukee
- St. Mary & St. Rewais Coptic Orthodox Church, Madison
- Virgin Mary & Archangel Michael Coptic Orthodox Church, Springfield

== US Territories ==
In addition to the confederated states, several other areas belong to territories officially held under the United States:

=== US Virgin Islands ===
- St. Mark Coptic Orthodox Church, St. Thomas

== Gallery ==
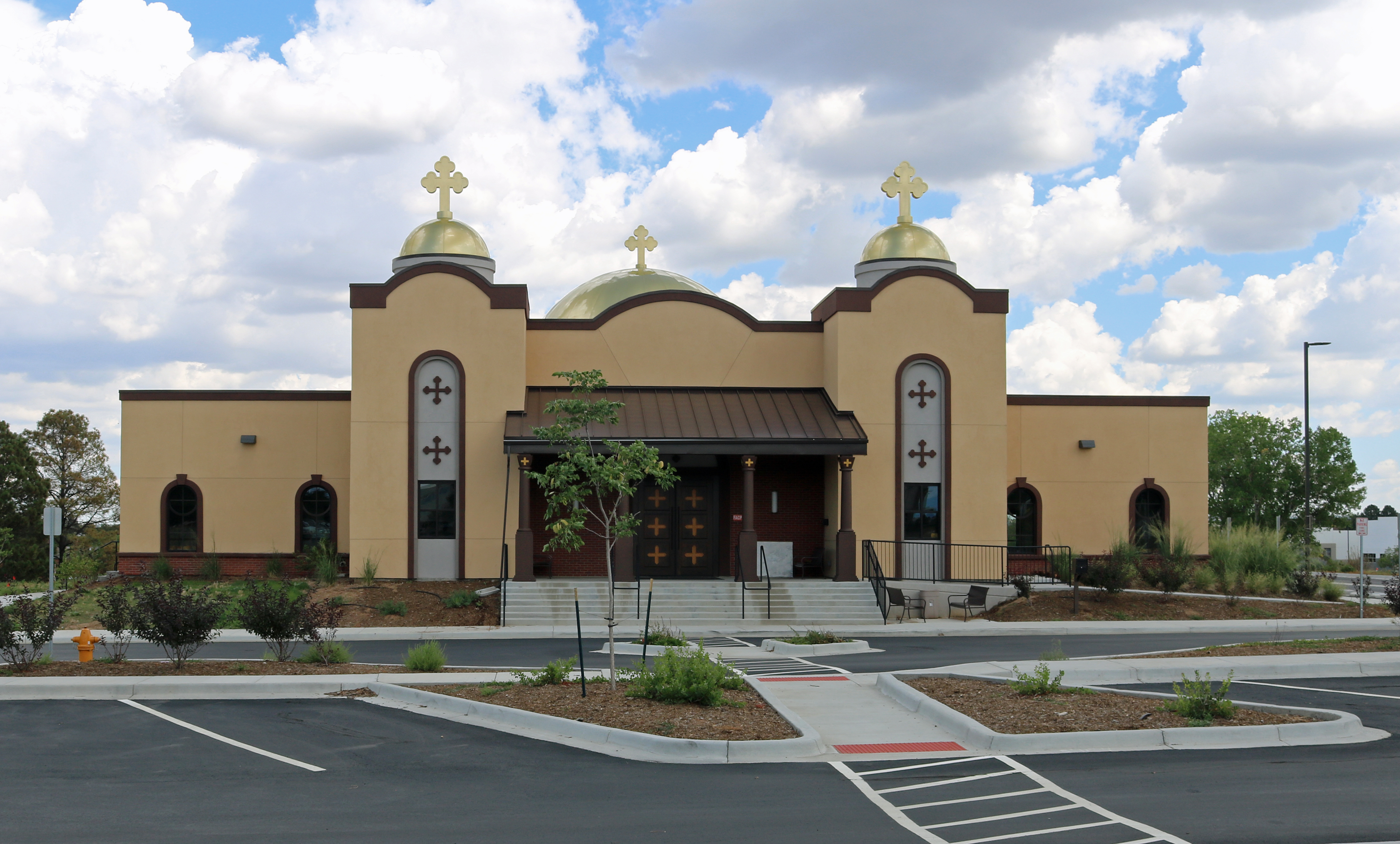
St. Mark Coptic Orthodox Church of Centennial, CO

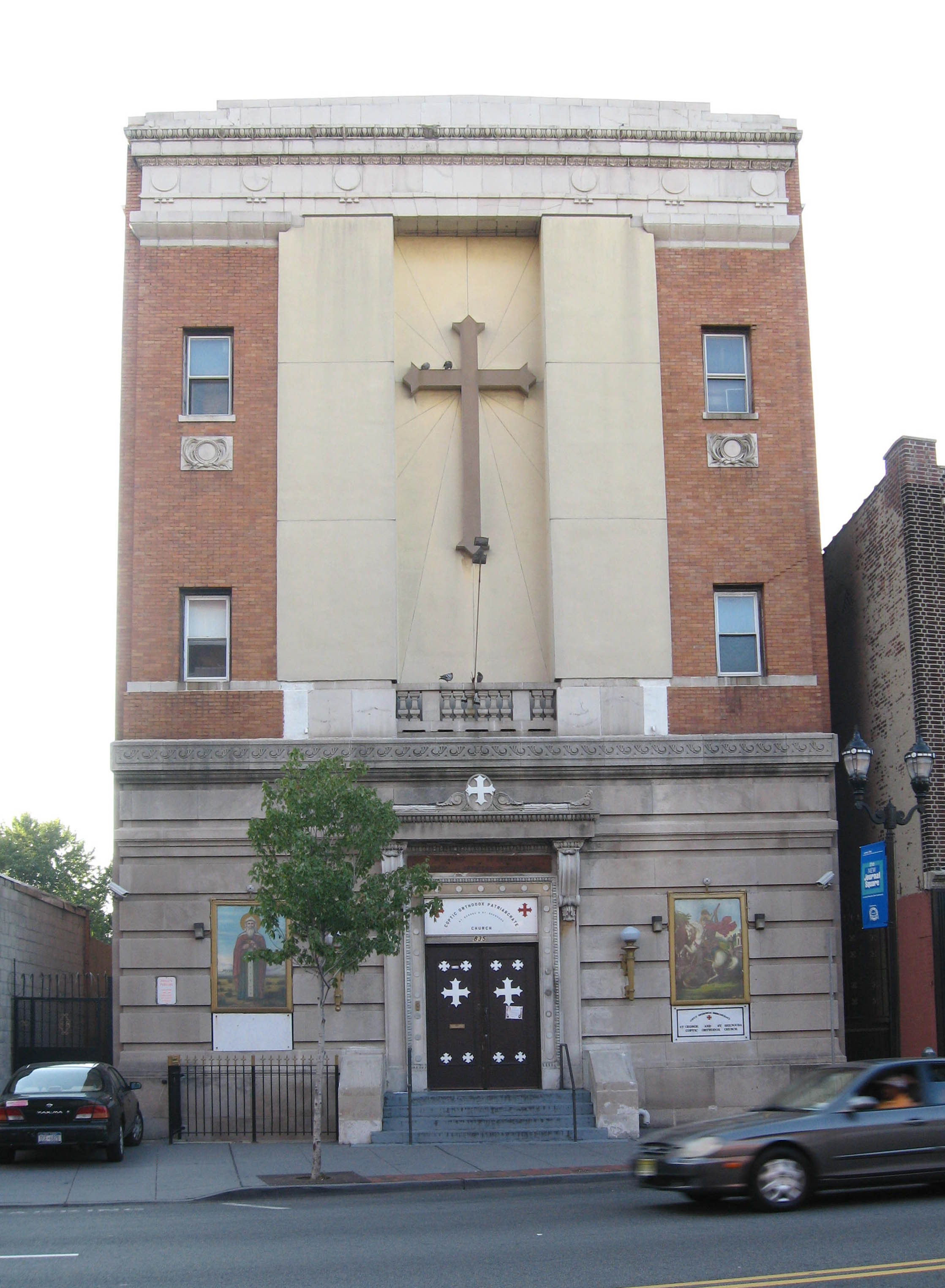
Sts. George & Shenouda Coptic Orthodox Church of Jersey City, NJ

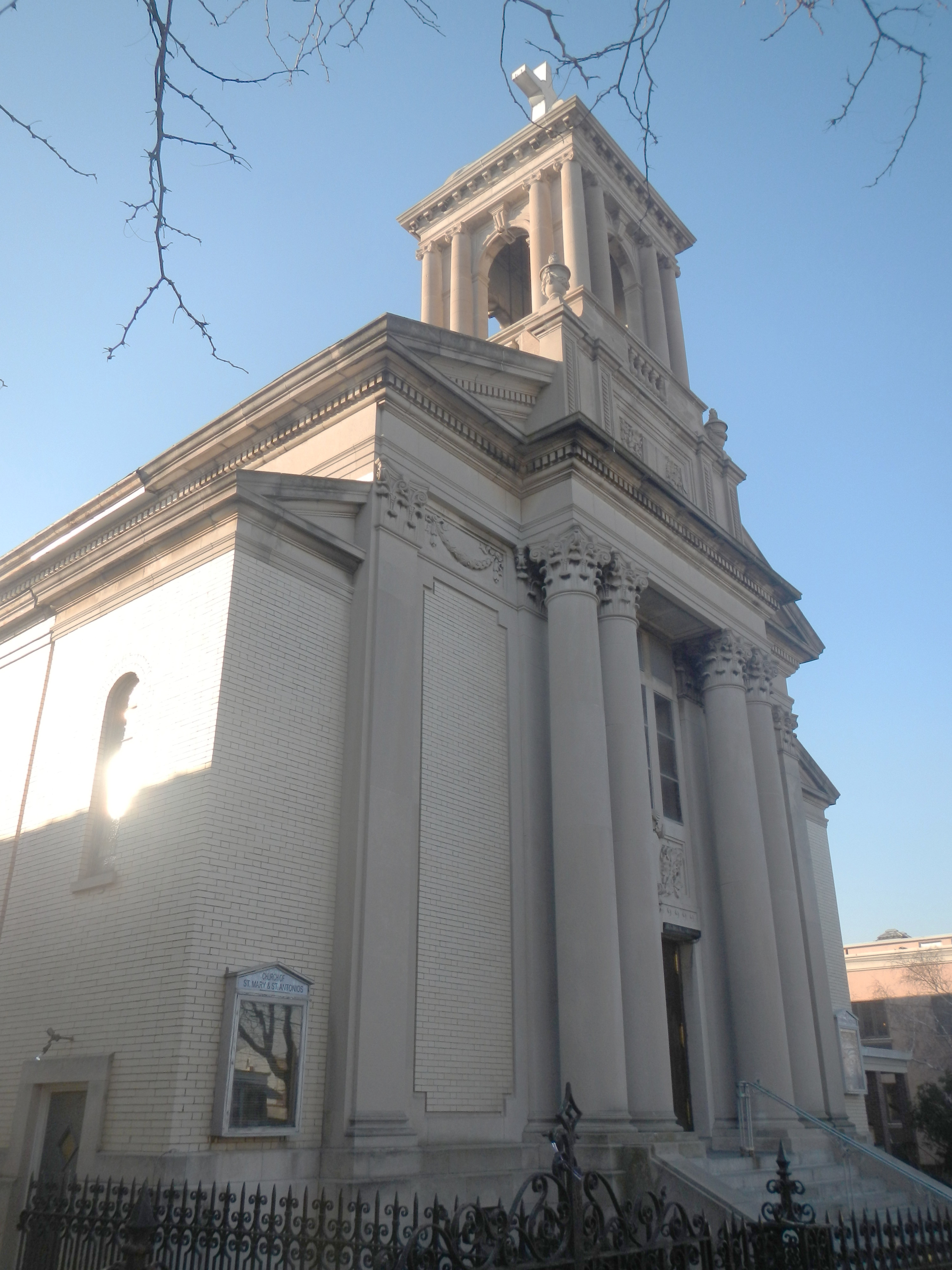
Sts. Mary & Antonionus Coptic Orthodox Church of Queens, NY

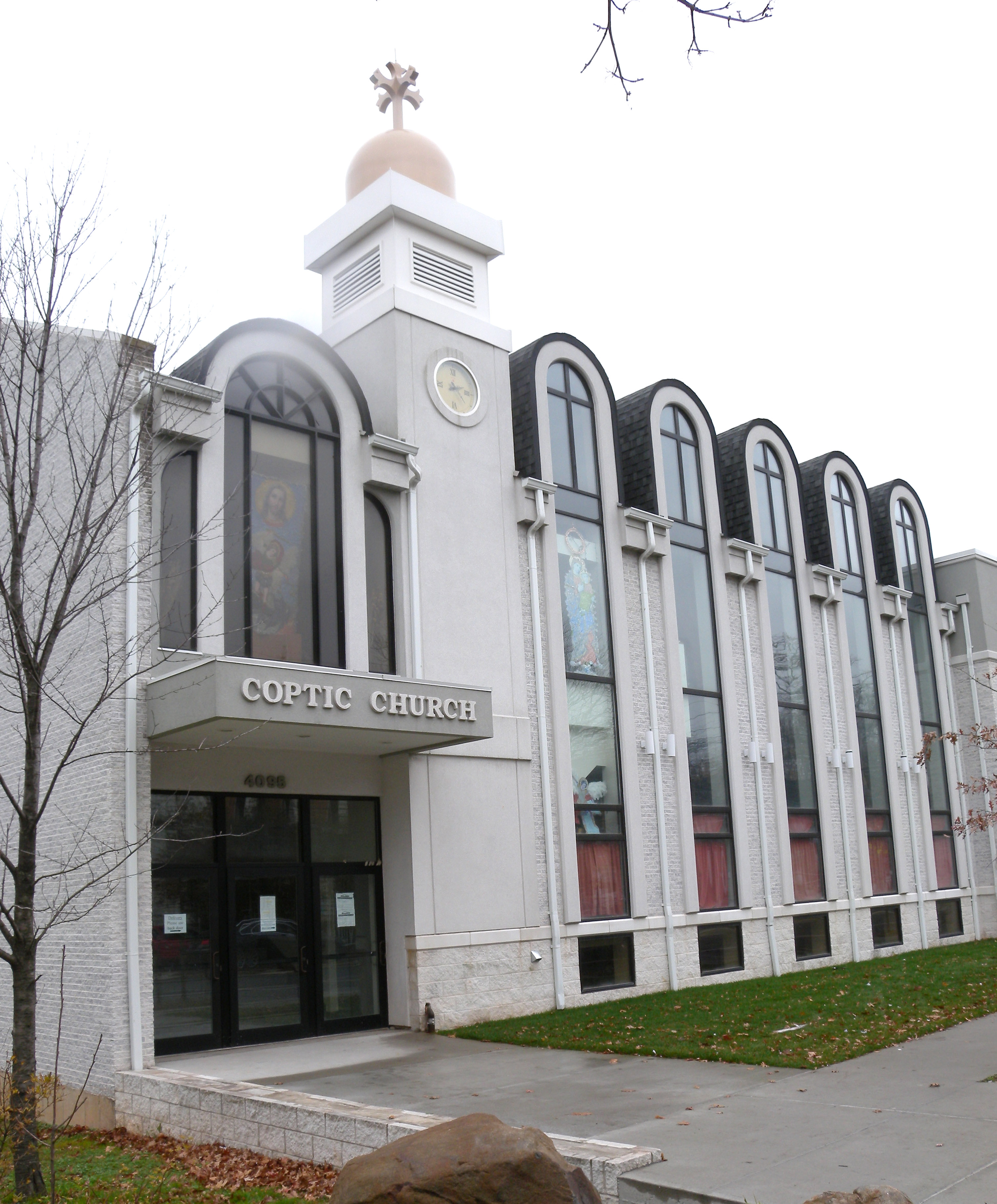
Archangel Michael & St. Mena Coptic Orthodox Church of Staten Island, NY

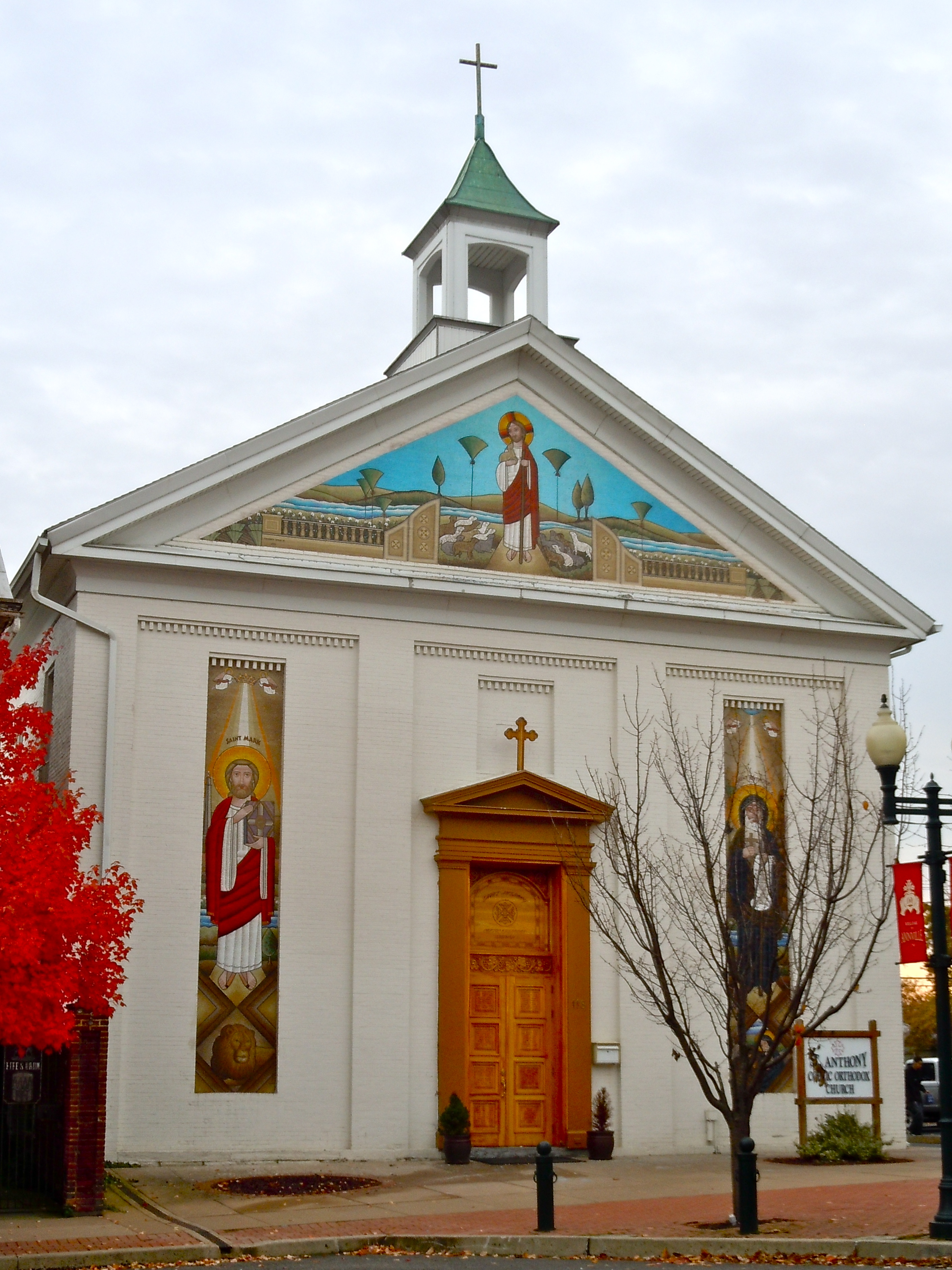
St. Anthony Coptic Orthodox Church of Annville, PA

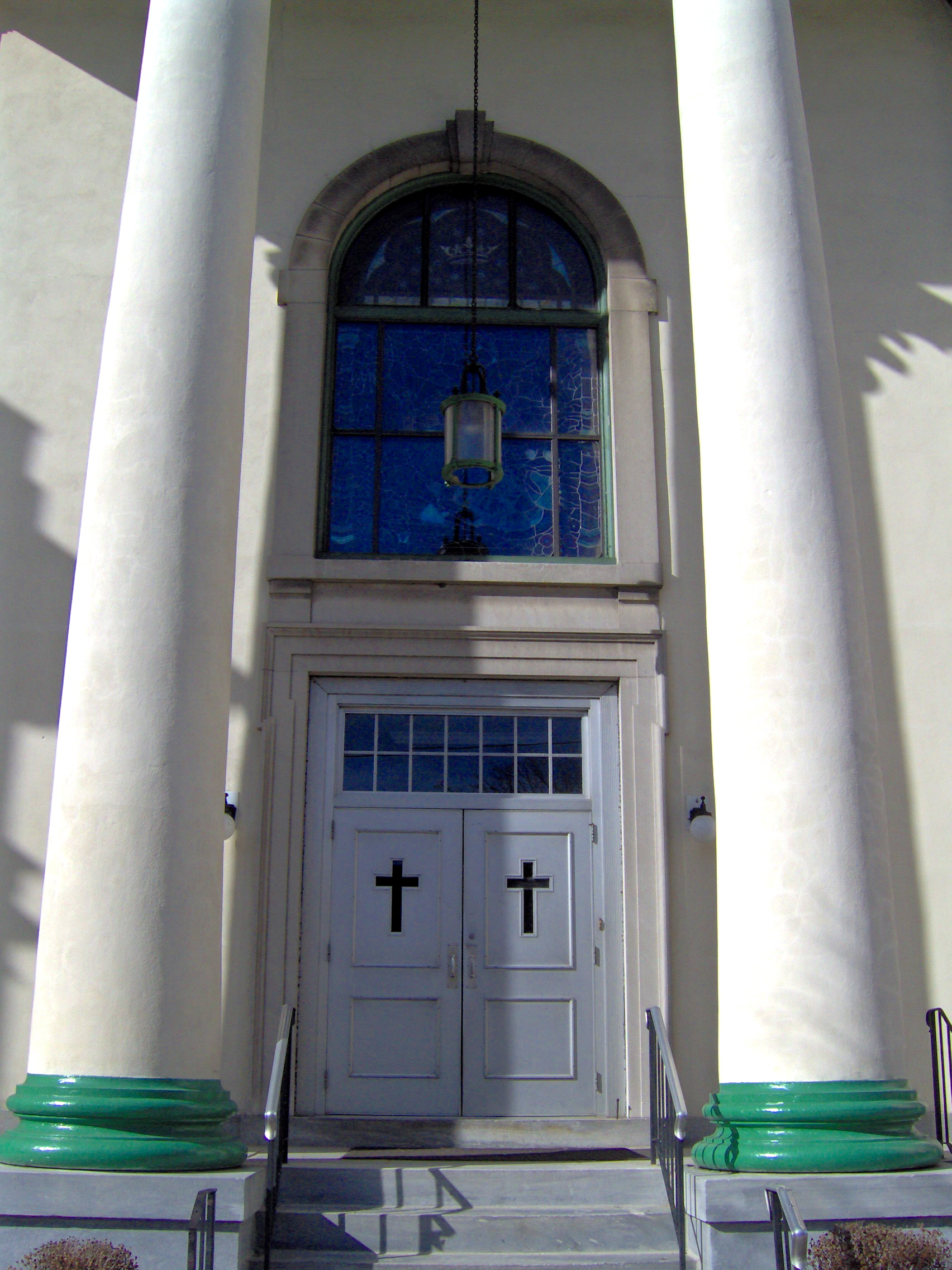
St. George Coptic Orthodox Church of Norristown, PA

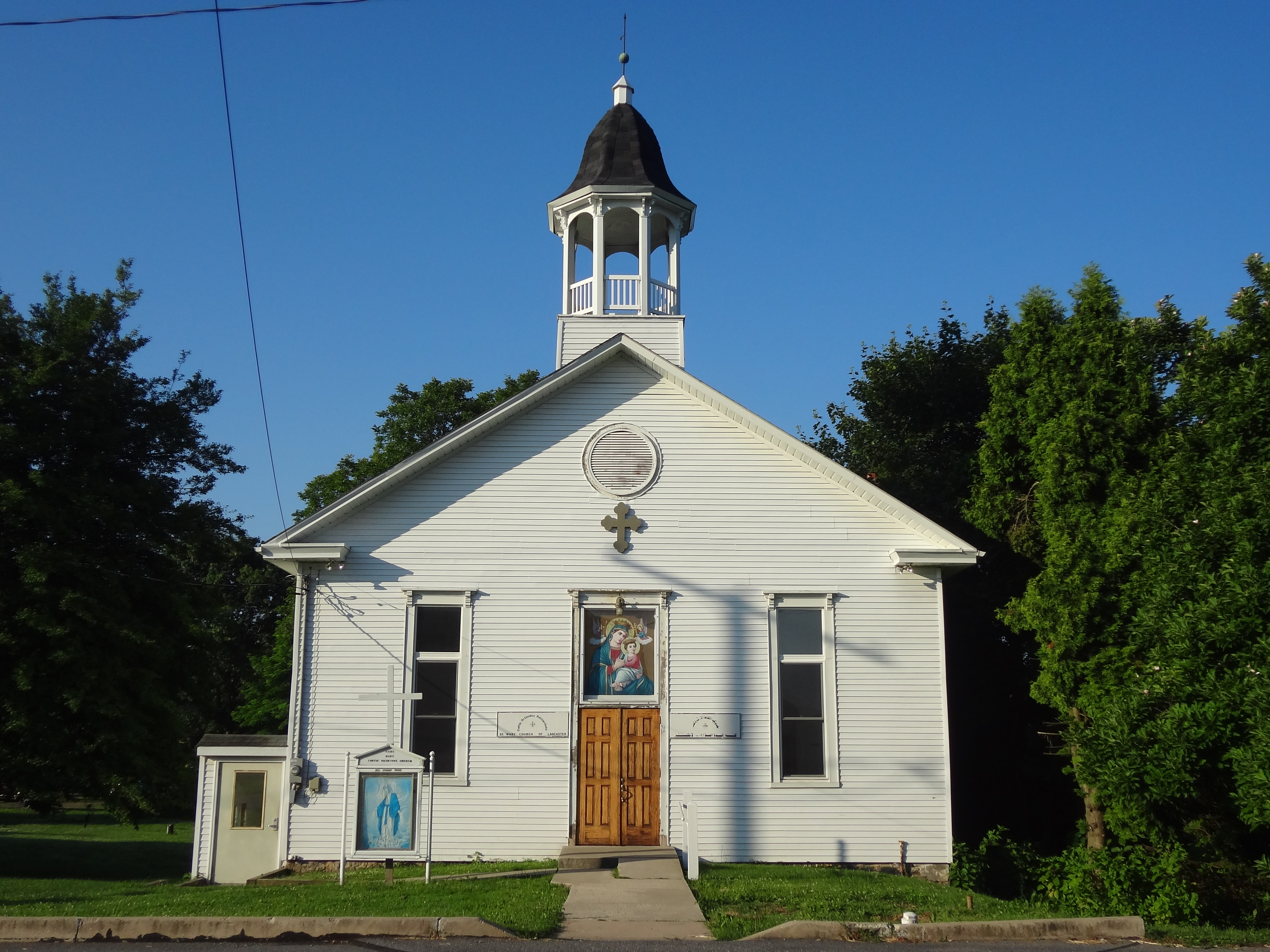
St. Mary Coptic Orthodox Church of Lancaster, PA

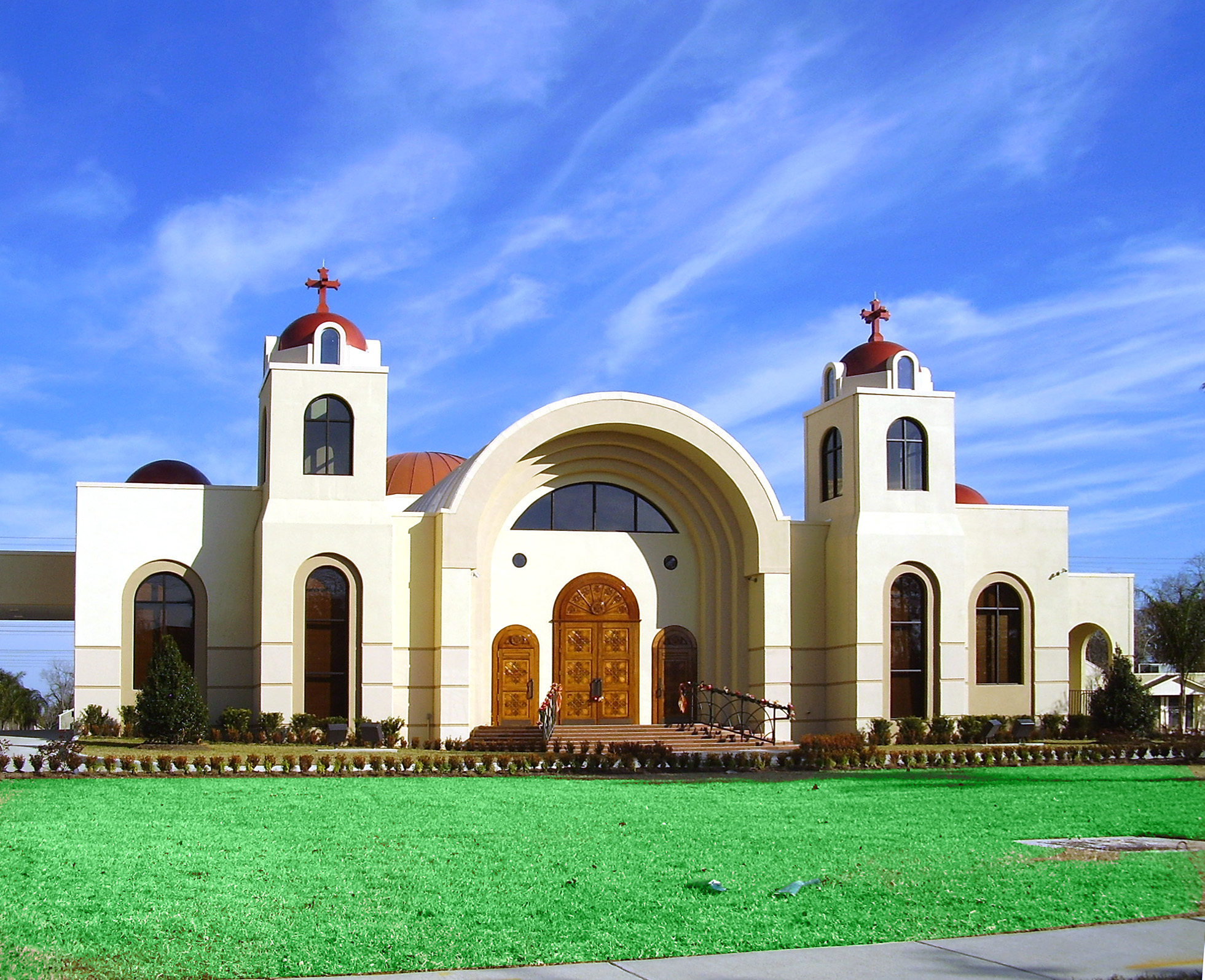
St. Mark Coptic Orthodox Church of Bellaire, TX

== See also ==
- Coptic Americans
- List of Coptic Orthodox churches in Egypt
- List of Coptic Orthodox churches in Canada
- Coptic Orthodox Church in North America
- Coptic Orthodox Church in the United States
- Pope Shenouda III of Alexandria
- Oriental Orthodox Churches
- Oriental Orthodoxy in North America
