= Magdi Khalil =

Egyptian political analyst

Magdi Khalil is an Egyptian-American political analyst, researcher, author and executive editor of the Egyptian weekly Watani International. He is also a columnist for Asharq Al-Awsat newspaper, London, a freelance writer for several Arabic language newspapers, and a frequent contributor to Middle East broadcast news TV.

Born to a Coptic family, he also heads the Middle East Collective for Freedoms (Arabic منتدى الشرق الأوسط للحريات, Muntada al Sharq al Awsat lil Hurriyyat) that was established in November 2007.

Khalil has also published three books and written numerous research papers on citizenship rights, civil society, and the situation of minorities in the Middle East. He is one of the most prominent advocates of human rights in Egypt. He focuses in his writings on minorities, including Copts in Egypt. He is a frequent guest on Al Jazeera Arabic's political debate program "The Opposite Direction" (الاتجاه المعاكس pronounced Al Ittijah al Mu'akes).
