= St. George Coptic Orthodox Church (Philadelphia) =

Saint George Coptic Orthodox Church of Greater Philadelphia
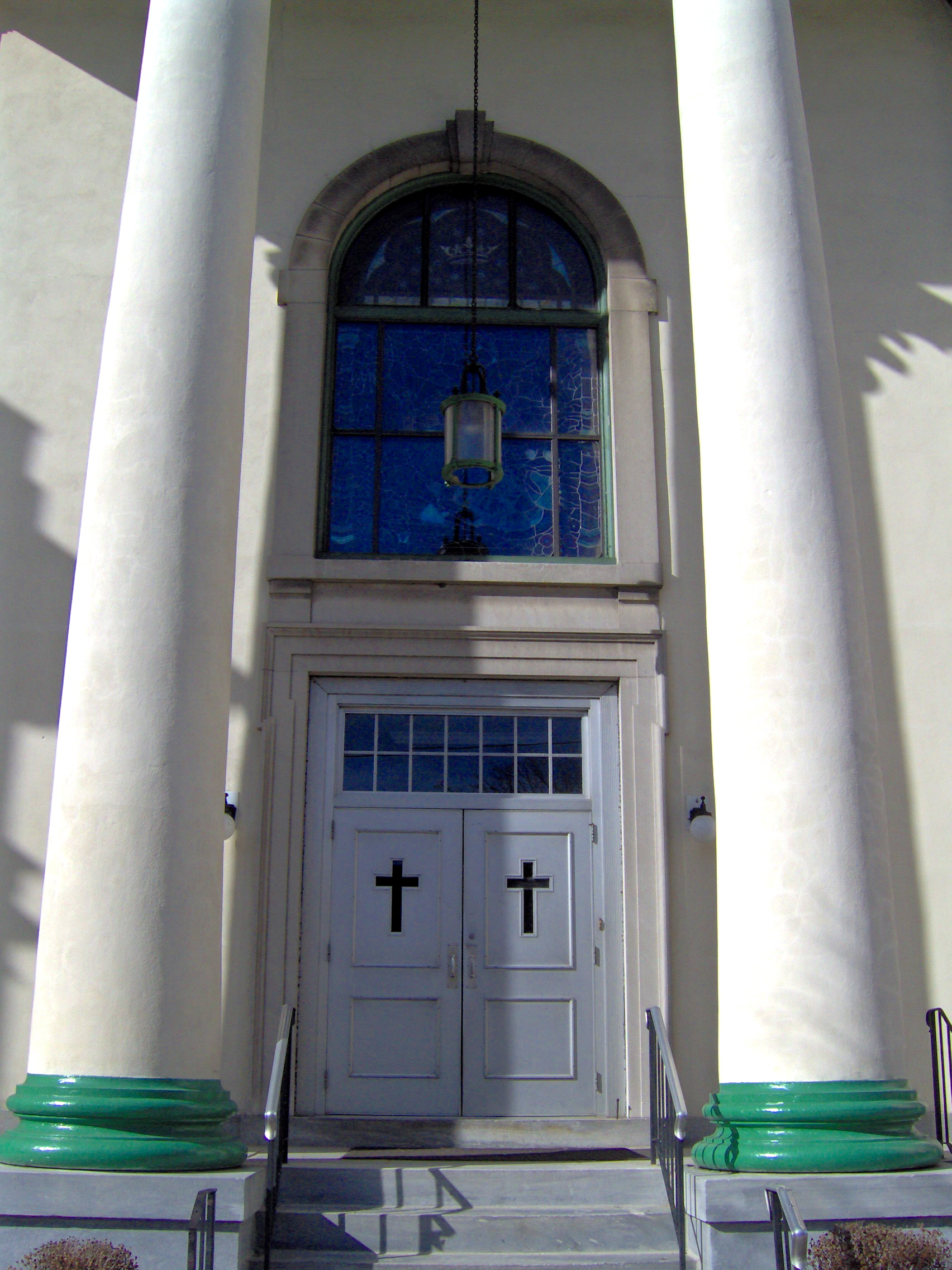
- The entrance of St. George Coptic Orthodox Church in Norristown, Pennsylvania.
- Saint George Coptic Orthodox Church of Greater Philadelphia
- 40.1148°N 75.3419°W
- Location: Norristown, Pennsylvania
- Country: United States
- Denomination: Coptic Orthodox Church of Alexandria
- Website: stgeorgephilly.org

History
- Founded: 1969
- Dedication: Saint George
- Dedicated: 1969
- Consecrated: October 1994

Architecture
- Architectural type: church
- Style: Coptic, Greek Revival
- Years built: 1863

Administration
- Diocese: Coptic Diocese of Pennsylvania, Maryland, Delaware & West Virginia

Clergy
- Bishop: Bishop Karas
- Priest(s): Fr. Roufail Z. Youssef; Fr. Mina Shaheid

St George Coptic Orthodox Church (Coptic: Ϯⲉⲕ'ⲕⲗⲏⲥⲓⲁ ⳿ⲛⲣⲉⲙ⳿ⲛⲭⲏⲙⲓ ⳿ⲛⲟⲣⲑⲟⲇⲟⲝⲟⲥ ⳿ⲛⲧⲉ ⲫⲏⲉⲑⲟⲩⲁⲃ Ⲅⲉ⳿ⲱⲣⲅⲓⲟⲥ // transliteration: ti.eklyseya en.remenkimi en.orthodoxos ente fi.ethowab Gewargios) is one of the oldest Coptic Orthodox churches established in North America. It is one of over 200 Coptic Orthodox Churches in the US. The church belongs to Coptic Diocese of Pennsylvania, Maryland, Delaware & West Virginia.

== History ==
St. George Coptic Orthodox Church was the first Coptic Orthodox church established in Pennsylvania, in 1969. It was incorporated in May 1973 with 30 families at the time. Several Coptic Orthodox priests served the congregation in churches of other denominations until 1980, when a building in Conshohocken was purchased. Pope Shenouda III assigned Father Samuel Thabet Samuel to head that church in September 1983, and Father Samuel and his wife and two children left Egypt and moved to Roxborough.

The congregation later bought the current building in Norristown, Pennsylvania. The Greek Revival church was originally built in 1863 for a congregation of the Trinity Evangelical Lutheran Church. The interior was modified so that the building could be used for Coptic Orthodox Liturgies; the exterior, however, retained its architectural style. The building was consecrated in October 1994, by Pope Shenouda III.

The parish had more than one priest in its history. Fr. Angelos Habib Boghdadi served the parish in its early years, as well as several other Coptic churches throughout the States, including St. Mary Coptic Orthodox Church in Ambridge, Pennsylvania. Fr. Boghdadi is currently the priest of St. George Church in Tampa, Florida.

=== Formative years ===
During the church's formative years in the 1980s, Fr. Samuel Thabet Samuel was the parish priest. He served until 1990 when summoned by Pope Shenouda III to serve St. Mark Coptic Orthodox Church of Chicago, Illinois , becoming the senior priest. In 1991 Pope Shenouda sent Fr. Roufail Z. Youssef as parish priest. Over 300 Coptic families are served by St. George's Church.

== See also ==
- Coptic Orthodox Church
- Coptic Orthodox Church in the United States
