= Egyptian Canadians =

Canadians of Egyptian ancestry

Egyptian Canadians Égypto-Canadiens
كنديين مصريين

Total population
- 105,245 (by ancestry, 2021 Census)

Regions with significant populations
- Ontario: 54,210
- Quebec: 30,240
- Alberta: 9,585
- British Columbia: 5,810

Languages
- Egyptian Arabic, Coptic, Sa'idi Arabic, Canadian English, Canadian French

Religion
- Christianity (56%), Islam (33%), Irreligion (8%), Jewish (2%) and other (1%)

Related ethnic groups
- Egyptians, Egyptian diaspora

Egyptian Canadians (Egyptian Arabic: كنديين مصريين) are Canadian citizens of Egyptian descent, first-generation Egyptian immigrants, or descendants of Egyptians who immigrated to Canada. According to the 2011 Census there were 73,250 Canadian citizens who are from Egypt, having an increase compared to those in the 2006 Census.

Egyptian-Canadians are mainly either Christians or Muslims. Most Christians are Coptic Orthodox with small numbers of Coptic Catholic and Coptic Protestant. Muslims are mostly Sunni.

During the 1960s, 75% of Egyptian immigrants settled in Montreal. By 1991, 49% of Egyptian Canadians were in Quebec, whereas 41% were living in Ontario. By 2011, 54% of Egyptian Canadians were living in Ontario and 31% in Quebec. Most Egyptian Canadians are concentrated in Toronto, Montreal and Vancouver.

== Geographical distribution ==
Province	Population	Percentage	Source
Ontario	52,840	0.4%	
Quebec	29,400	0.4%	
Alberta	8,530	0.2%	
British Columbia	4,520	0.1%	
Manitoba	1,340	0.1%	
Nova Scotia	800	0.1%	
Saskatchewan	540	0.1%	
Newfoundland and Labrador	320	0.1%	
New Brunswick	210	0.0%	
Prince Edward Island	115	0.1%	
Northwest Territories	10	0.0%	
Nunavut	10	0.0%	
Yukon	10	0.0%	
Canada	99,140	0.3%	

== Religion ==
Throughout the 1970s, immigrants from Egypt to Canada consisted of both Christians and Muslims, who mostly left due to poverty in their home country. Starting in 1985, the Canadian government encouraged investors to immigrate, which attracted wealthy Egyptians; these are described as "more conservative and less exposed to European influences than previous arrivals”.

A 1989 survey of Egyptian Canadians in Quebec found that 35% were Copts, 20% Catholics, and 19% Muslims, while 13% followed other faiths and 12% did not indicate any religion.

The 2011 Census found that 73,250 people reported "Egyptian" ancestry and 3,570 reported "Coptic" ancestry. It also found that 16,255 people reported Coptic Orthodox church as their religion.

Egyptian Canadian demography by religion
Religious group	2021 (Note: Religious breakdown proportions based on "Egyptian" and « Coptic » ethnic or cultural origin response on the 2021 census.)		2001	
Religious group	Pop.	%	Pop.	%
Catholic	11,815	9.24%	10,075	24.39%
Protestant	2,905	2.27%	2,100	5.08%
Oriental Orthodox	43,835	34.3%	12,650	30.62%
Non-denominational Christian	15,180	11.88%	3,370	8.16%
(Total Christian)	73,735	57.69%	28,195	68.25%
Islam	40,670	31.82%	10,450	25.3%
Judaism	1,630	1.28%	545	1.32%
Other	360	0.28%	150	0.36%
Irreligious	11,415	8.93%	1,965	4.76%
Total Egyptian Canadian population	127,815	100%	41,310	100%

== Notable people ==
- Sheref Sabawy – Member of Provincial Parliament in Ontario, of Egyptian origin
- Athena Karkanis – film actor, voice actor
- Maryse Andraos – writer
- Manuel Tadros – singer, songwriter, actor, comedian and voice actor
- Xavier Dolan – filmmaker, son of Manuel Tadros
- Mohamed Fahmy – journalist, author
- Jean Mohsen Fahmy – writer
- Alex Erian – one of the two vocalists of Despised Icon
- Mena Massoud – actor
- Yasmine Mohammed – human rights activist, author
- Ariel Helwani – sports journalist, born in Canada to an Egyptian Jewish father and Lebanese Jewish mother
- Omar Marmoush – footballer, born in Egypt to Egyptian-Canadian parents and has dual Egyptian-Canadian citizenship
- Noor Naga – writer
- Adel Sedra – electrical engineer and University Professor
- Marcus Youssef – playwright
- Zeina – pop singer
- Michael Hage – hockey player of Egyptian descent selected 1st round in the 2024 NHL draft with the Montreal Canadiens.
- Vanessa Lengies – actress
- Amir Ali – Canadian-American judge

== See also ==
- Middle Eastern Canadians
- Ethnic groups in Canada
- Coptic Canadians
- List of Copts
- Coptic Orthodoxy in Canada
- List of Coptic Orthodox churches in Canada
- Egyptian Americans
- Egyptian Australians
- Egyptians in the United Kingdom
- Canada–Egypt relations
