= Orthodoxy in America =

The term Orthodoxy in America or Orthodoxy in the Americas may refer to:

- in relation to Orthodox Judaism:
  - Orthodox Judaism in the United States of America, representing communities and institutions of Orthodox Judaism in the USA
  - Orthodox Judaism in the Americas, representing communities and institutions of Orthodox Judaism in North and South America
- in relation to Eastern Orthodox Christianity:
  - Eastern Orthodoxy in the United States of America, representing communities and institutions of Eastern Orthodox Christianity in the USA
  - Eastern Orthodoxy in North America, representing communities and institutions of Eastern Orthodox Christianity in North America
  - Eastern Orthodoxy in South America, representing communities and institutions of Eastern Orthodox Christianity in South America
- in relation to Oriental Orthodox Christianity:
  - Oriental Orthodoxy in the United States of America, representing communities and institutions of Oriental Orthodox Christianity in the USA
  - Oriental Orthodoxy in North America, representing communities and institutions of Oriental Orthodox Christianity in North America
  - Oriental Orthodoxy in South America, representing communities and institutions of Oriental Orthodox Christianity in South America

== See also ==
- Orthodoxy (disambiguation)
- America (disambiguation)
- Orthodox Church (disambiguation)
- Orthodox Church in America (disambiguation)
