= Coptic diaspora =

Copts who live outside Egypt, Libya and Sudan

ϯⲇⲓⲁⲥⲡⲟⲣⲁ `ⲛⲣⲉⲙⲛⲭⲏⲙⲓ
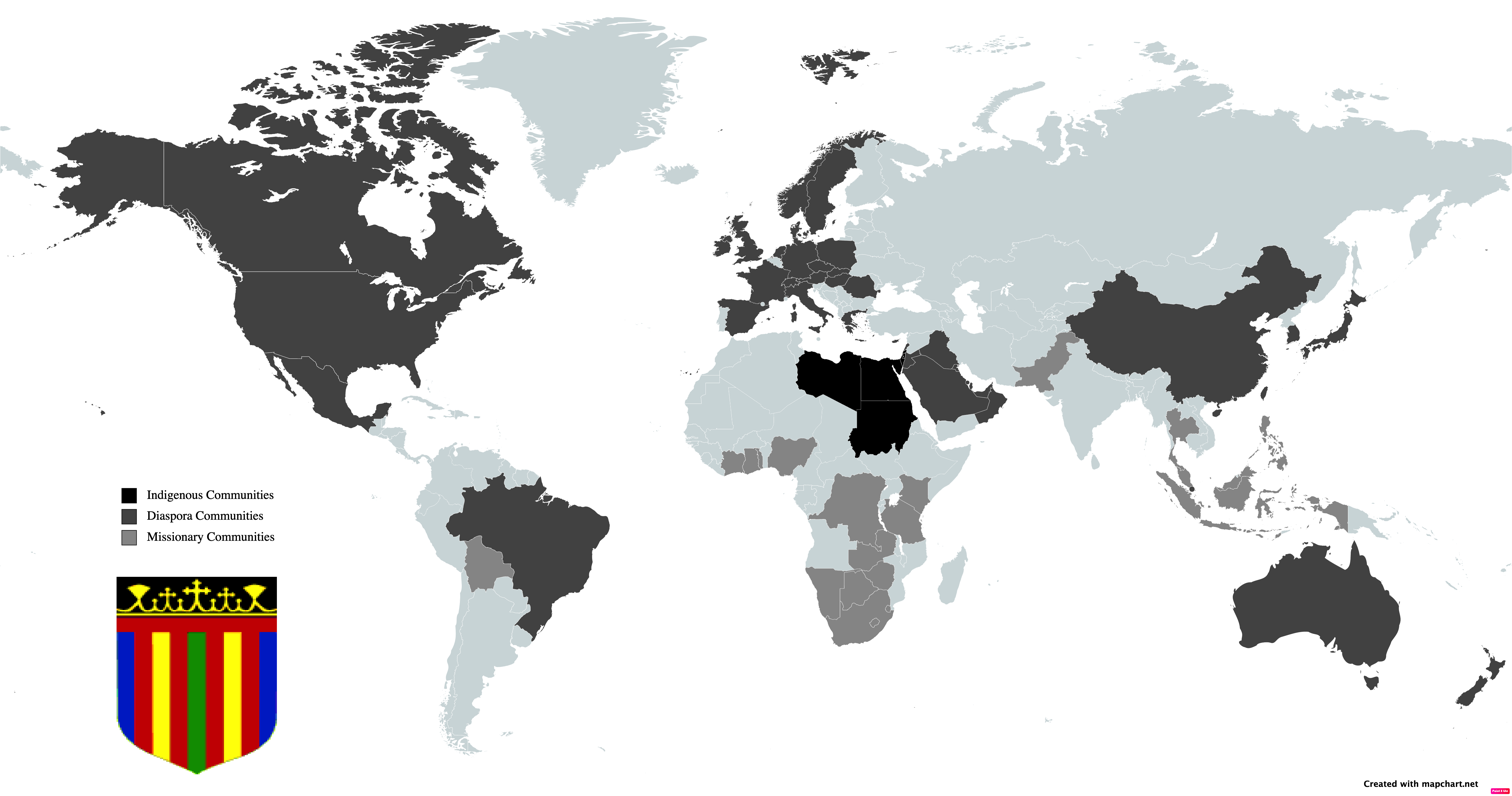

Total population
- 1–2 million (estimates vary)

Regions with significant populations
- United States: c. 100,000 to 300,000 (late 2010s estimate)
- France: 45,000
- Canada: c. 50,000 (1995 estimate); 10,000 (2001 estimate)
- Australia: c. 32,000 (2006)
- Kuwait: 65,000
- Italy: 30,000
- United Kingdom: 25,000–30,000 (2006)
- United Arab Emirates: c. 10,000
- Jordan: 8,000+ (2005)
- Kenya: 8,000+
- Lebanon: 3,000 – 4,000 (2012)

Languages
- Diaspora: English, French and others; Only in Egypt, Sudan, Libya spoken: Arabic; Liturgical: Coptic

Religion
- Predominantly: Coptic Orthodoxy; Minorities: Coptic Catholicism and various Protestant denominations

The Coptic diaspora (Coptic: ϯⲇⲓⲁⲥⲡⲟⲣⲁ `ⲛⲣⲉⲙⲛⲭⲏⲙⲓ, romanized: ti-diaspora en-remenkemi) consists of Copts who live outside of their primary area of residence within parts of present-day Egypt, Libya and Sudan.

The number of Copts outside Egypt has sharply increased since the 1960s. The largest Coptic diaspora populations are in the United States, in Canada and in Australia, but Copts have a presence in many other countries.

== Population ==
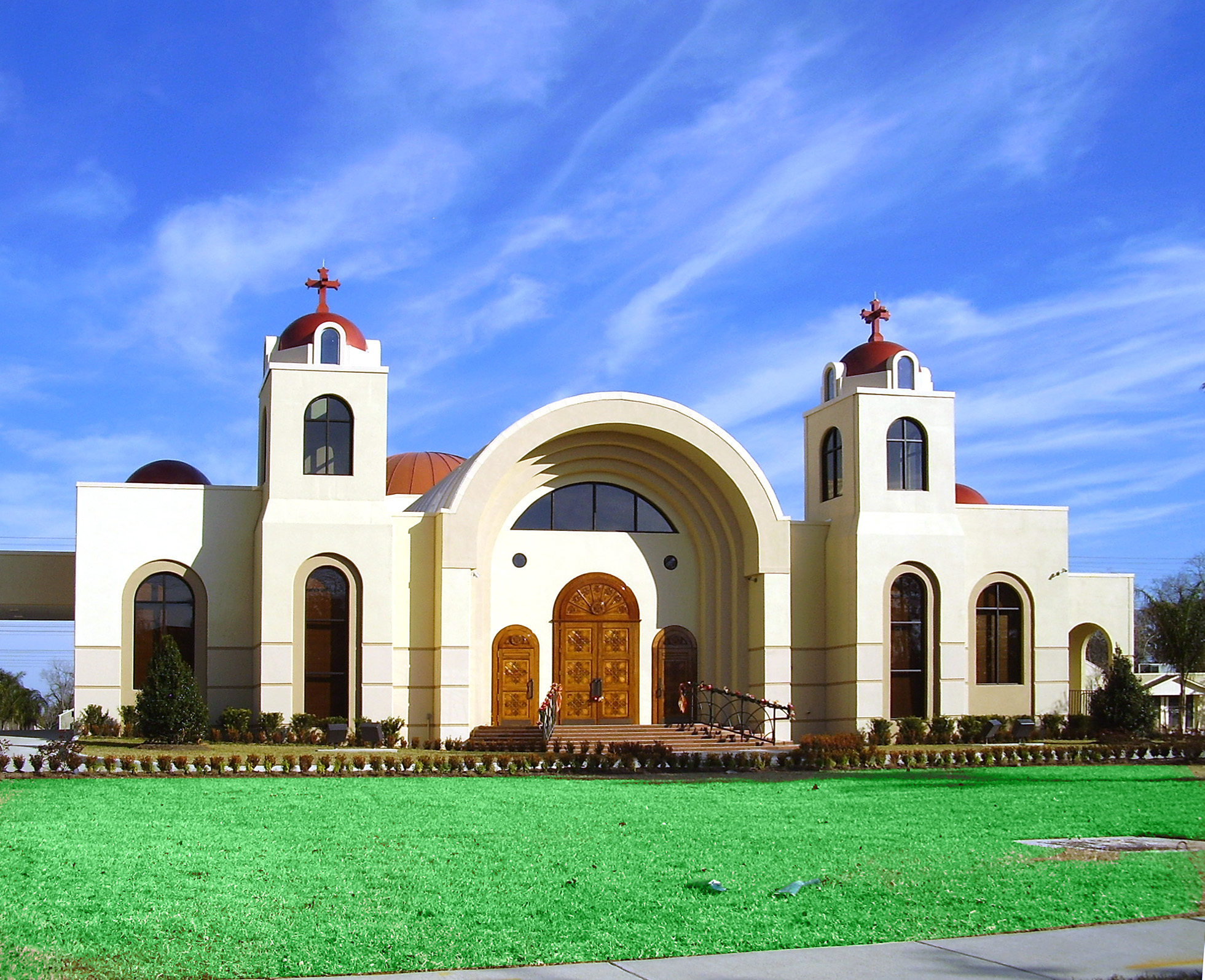
St. Mark Coptic Orthodox Church in Bellaire, Texas, in the United States.

Copts in Egypt make up about 10–20% of the population. (Note: Independent estimates of the size of the Egyptian Coptic population vary. The Oxford Handbook of Global Religions reports: "There are conflicting estimates for the size of Egypt's Coptic population. As is often the case with minorities, official counts tend to underestimate their size, while the minority group inflates its own numbers." The BBC reported in 2004 that Copts make up between 5% and 10% of the Egyptian population. The CIA World Factbook reported a 2012 estimate that the Christian community in Egypt (including both Copts and non-Copts) is about 10%. A 2005 report by the Washington Institute for Near East Policy reported that "Christians make up 4–15 percent of Egypt's population of a hundred million, though precise estimates of the number of Copts vary widely.")

Copts in Sudan make up about half a million or 1.5% of Sudanese population.

There are about 60,000 Copts in Libya, 1% of Libyan population, making up the majority of that country's Christian community. At least a few hundred Copts live in Chad where there are four Orthodox churchs (St. Athanasius of Alexandria Orthodox Church in N'Djamena, Holy Resurrection Orthodox Church in Fianga, St. Catherine Orthodox Community in Bongor Hanhan and St. Mark Orthodox Community in Goala). These orthodox churches are also attended by local Chadians as well as Greek, Lebanese Christian and Ethiopian expats. Copts in N'Djamena have a reputation for working as doctors. In recent years, Copts fleeing war in Sudan and Libya have increased the Coptic population in Chad. Orthodox churches can also be found in Central African Republic, Cameroon, Nigeria and other African countries but it's not clear what percentage of parishioners are ethnic Copts.

Outside of the traditional Coptic areas in Egypt, Sudan and Libya, the largest Coptic diaspora populations are in the United States, in Canada and in Australia.

According to one scholar: "Estimations of the actual number of Egyptian Copts (and their descendants) living abroad vary enormously, with those circulated by Coptic expatriate activists. The biggest Coptic community abroad, that of the United States, included up to 1,000,000 persons in the late 2010s according to Coptic advocacy groups, but only 300,000 according to the Coptic Orthodox Church in the United States itself, and even less—roughly between 100,000 and 200,000—according to the scarce statistical evidence supplied by the Egyptian and U.S. governments."

Smaller communities of Copts exist in Australia (estimated 32,000 in 2006) and in Canada (estimates vary: one 2001 estimate placed the population at 10,000 while a 1995 estimate placed the population at 50,000).

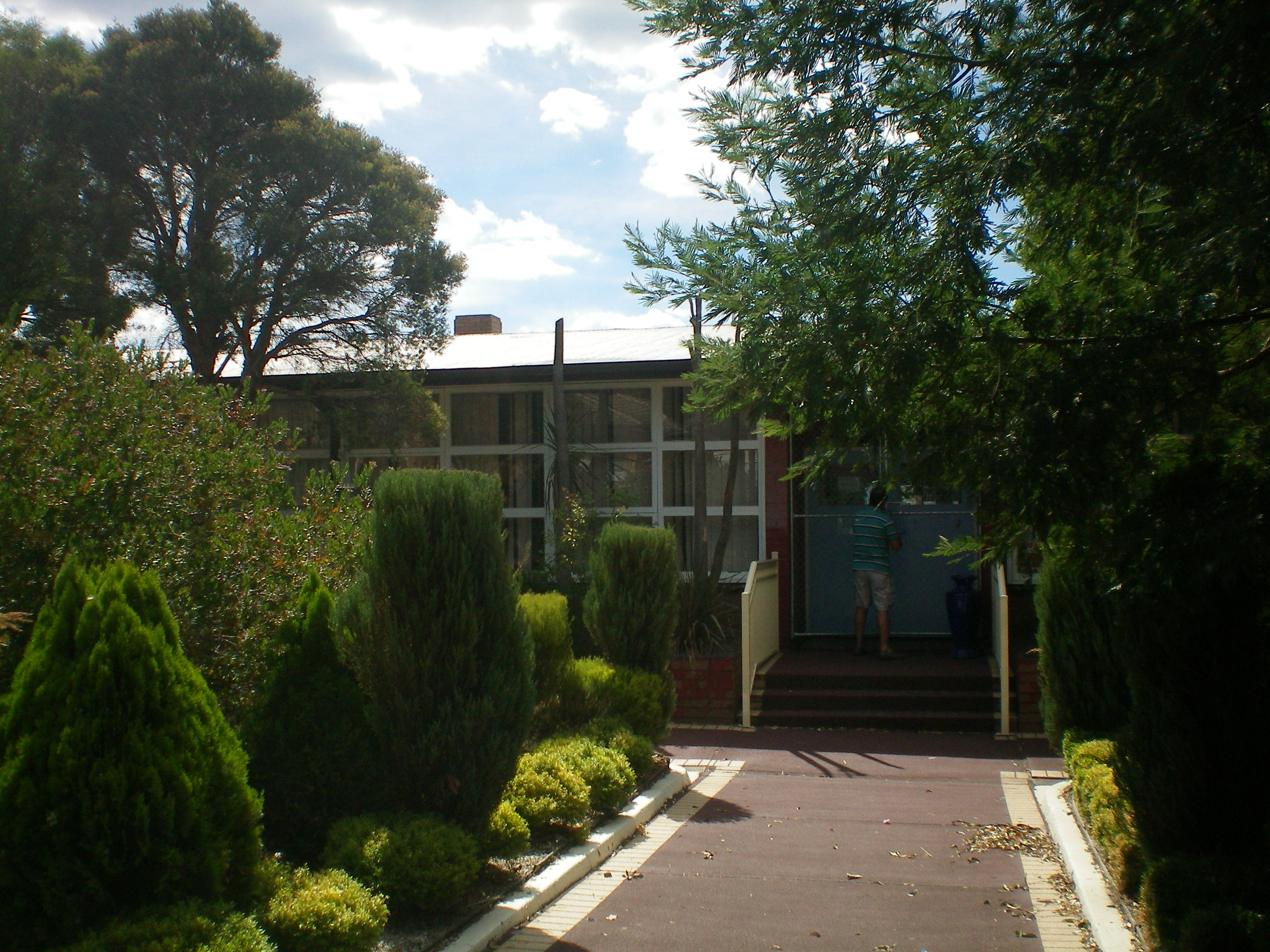
Coptic Orthodox college at Frankston, Victoria, Australia.

Smaller communities (under 10,000 people) exist in Britain, France, Germany, Austria, Switzerland, and Italy.

In 2009 one scholar placed the total Coptic population of North America at more than 500,000.

In 1999, it was reported that there were "over eighty Coptic churches, two theological colleges, and a monastery in the United States in Canada; twenty-five churches, a theological college, three schools, and two monasteries in Australia, and thirty churches and two monasteries in Europe."

There is also a Coptic presence in Lebanon and Jordan, and well as the Arab states of the Persian Gulf, such as the United Arab Emirates. There is also a Coptic presence (due to recent missionary work) in the sub-Saharan African countries of Zambia, Kenya, The Democratic Republic of the Congo, Zimbabwe, Namibia, and South Africa.

== Causes and history of the Coptic diaspora ==
The Coptic diaspora began primarily in the 1950s as result of discrimination, persecution of Copts and low income in Egypt. After Gamal Abdel Nasser rose to power, economic and social conditions deteriorated and many wealthier Egyptians, especially Copts, emigrated to Europe and the United States. Emigration increased following the 1967 Arab-Israeli war, and the emigration of poorer and less-educated Copts increased after 1972, when the World Council of Churches and other religious groups began assisting Coptic immigration. Emigration of Egyptian Copts increased under Anwar al-Sadat (with many taking advantage of Sadat's "open door" policy to leave the country) and under Hosni Mubarak.

Many Copts are university graduates in the professions, such as medicine and engineering.

== Identity ==
According to Mariz Tadros, the discourse that refers to Copts as the original inhabitants of the land [Egypt] and others as having less claims to it, which she described as "supremacist and exclusionary", is adopted by some Copts living in the diaspora, such as Shawky Karas. However, she added that this discourse "doesn't have much currency, whether among the coptic intelligentsia in Egypt or among the Coptic population at large." On the other hand, the mainstream discourse adopted by Coptic historians presents a common Egyptian history binding together all Egyptians.

== See also ==
- List of Copts
- Coptic Orthodox Church in Asia
- Coptic Orthodox Church in Malaysia
- Coptic Orthodox Church in Europe
- French Coptic Orthodox Church
- Coptic Orthodox Church in Britain and Ireland
- Coptic Orthodox Church in North America
- Coptic Orthodox Church in Canada
- Coptic Orthodox Church in Mexico
- List of Coptic Orthodox Churches in Canada
- Coptic Orthodox Church in South America
