= Coptic Orthodox Church in Africa =

Branch of the Coptic Orthodox Church

This article, dealing with the Coptic Orthodox Church in Africa, is about the Coptic Orthodox Church of Alexandria in African countries other than Egypt.

The Apostolic Throne of the Coptic Orthodox Church of Alexandria is based in the ancient Alexandria, Egypt (which is in Africa). The jurisdiction of the Church of Alexandria extended, as per Canon law of the First and Second Ecumenical Councils, to the Province of Egypt, Nubia and Pentapolis. Later on in expanded south to encompass all of what is now known as the Sudan.

Since the demise of the Latin (Roman) North African Archiepiscopate of Carthage (which covered all of North and West Africa, apart from Egypt, Pentapolis and Libya) in the 8th century, Alexandria became the sole Apostolic Throne in the entire continent of Africa (or what was known of it at that time). The historical evangelization of the Apostolic Throne of Alexandria in Africa, apart from Egypt, Pentapolis, Libya, Nubia and the Sudan, does extend to:

== Ethiopia ==
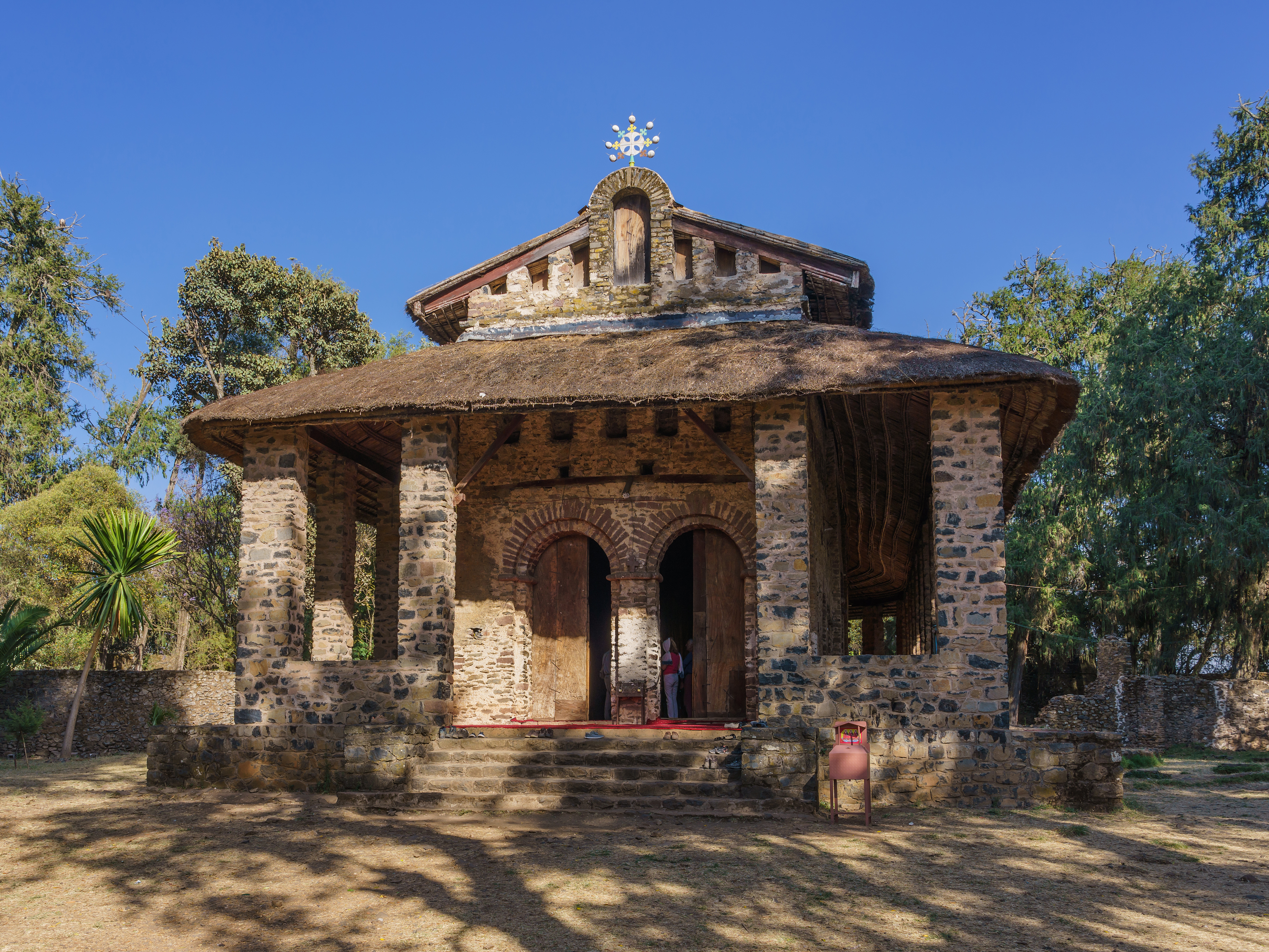
An Ethiopian orthodox Church in Gondar, Ethiopia.

Ethiopia constituted a major archdiocese of the Church of Alexandria, which was always governed by an Egyptian Patriarchal Vicar in the rank of Archbishop since the 4th century, and named Abuna Salama by the Ethiopian Church. By 1929, the Alexandrine Throne allowed the Ethiopian clergy to participate in the governing of their own Church, and the first native Ethiopian archbishop was enthroned in 1930 (thus becoming an autonomous church). In 1959, an agreement was reached between the Ethiopian Holy Synod and the Alexandrine Throne to have their own Patriarch-Catholicos in a transitional period. The Ethiopian Archbishop ordained as Primate of the Ethiopian Orthodox Church back in 1950, was elevated by the Coptic Orthodox Pope Joseph II of Alexandria in Cairo and enthroned in Addis Ababa by the members of the Ethiopian Holy Synod and an Alexandrine delegation. The first Prelate, Abuna Basilius I (1959-1971), Patriarch-Catholicos of Addis Ababa and all Ethiopia, was ordained and enthroned in 1959, by Pope Cyril VI of Alexandria.

The relation between the two churches improved significantly upon the signing of common declaration by the two patriarchs and the visit of Abuna Paulos to Egypt and the visit of Pope Shenouda to Ethiopia.

== Eritrea ==
Whose own Prelate, Abuna Philipos I (1998-2002), Patriarch of Asmara and of all Eritrea, was ordained and enthroned in May 1998, by Shenouda III, Pope and Patriarch of Alexandria. This made the new Patriarchate of Asmara and of all Eritrea a hierarchically and jurisdictionally independent "autocephalous patriarchate" (Eritrean Orthodox Church). The Current Prelate, Abune Antonios I (2004-2022), is the third Patriarch of Asmara and all Eritrea, who succeeded Yacob I (2003-2004) the second Patriarch of Asmara and all Eritrea. He was replaced by Abuna Discoros I in 2006. Both the Patriarchate of Addis Ababa and all Ethiopia and the Patriarchate of Asmara and all Eritrea acknowledge the supremacy of the Pope and Patriarch of Alexandria as both Patriarchates were established by the Throne of Alexandria and have their roots in the Apostolic Church of Alexandria, and acknowledge that Saint Mark the Apostle is the founder of their Churches through the heritage and Apostolic evangelization of the Fathers of Alexandria.

In other words, the Patriarchate of Addis Ababa and all Ethiopia and the Patriarchate of Asmara and all Eritrea are daughter Churches of the Holy Apostolic Patriarchate of Alexandria.

== The Sudan ==
This country, which had both Egyptian expatriates and native adherents, is divided into two eparchies and whose prelates are:

- Sarabamon (Serapis Amon), Metropolitan of the Holy Diocese of Atbara, Um Durman and All the North of the Sudan and Titular Bishop of the Great and Ancient Metropolis of Nubia: Faras of Nobadia, Dongola of Makouria and Soba of Aloudia.
- Elia (Elijah), Bishop of the Holy Diocese of Khartoum and All the South of the Sudan.

The number of Coptic Sudanese is estimated around 200,000.

== Libya, Tunisia, Algeria and Morocco ==
Christianity spread to the Pentapolis of North Africa from Egypt; Synesius of Cyrene (370-414), bishop of Ptolemais, received his instruction at Alexandria in both the Catechetical School and the Museion, and he entertained a great deal of reverence and affection for Hypatia, the last pagan Neoplatonists, whose classes he had attended. Synesius was raised to the episcopate by Theophilus, patriarch of Alexandria, in 410 A.D. Since the Council of Nicaea in 325 A.D., Cyrenaica had been recognized as an ecclesiastical province of the See of Alexandria, in accordance with the ruling of the Nicaean Fathers. Pope of the Coptic Orthodox Church of Alexandria to this day includes the Pentapolis in his title as an area within his jurisdiction.

The Coptic congregations in these countries were under the ancient Eparchy of the Western Pentapolis, which was part of the Coptic Orthodox Church for centuries until the thirteenth century

In 1971 Pope Shenouda III reinstated it as part of the Eparchy of Pachomius, Metropolitan of the Holy Metropolis of Beheira (Thmuis and Hermopolis Parva), (Buto), Mariout (Mareotis), Marsa Matruh (Paraetonium), (Apis), Patriarchal Exarch of the Ancient Metropolis of Libya: (Livis, Marmarica, Darnis and Tripolitania) and Titular Metropolitan Archbishop of the Great and Ancient Metropolis of Pentapolis: (Cyrenaica), (Appollonia), (Ptolemais), (Berenice) and (Arsinoe).

This was one among a chain of many restructuring of several eparchies by Pope Shenouda III, while some of them were incorporated into the jurisdiction of others, especially those who were within an uncovered region or which were part of a Metropolis that became extinct, or by dividing large eparchies into smaller more manageable eparchies. This was part of the restructuring of the Church as a whole.

== Sub-Saharan Africa ==
Although The Coptic Orthodox Church had a bishop for missionary affairs in Africa in the 1950s this was not continued after the death of that bishop.

There are two bishops dealing with Sub-Saharan Africa:

- Currently the oldest serving Bishop in this area is Antonius Markos (Anthony Mark), General Bishop for African Affairs and Patriarchal Exarch in West and South Africa, who was consecrated in the 1976 by Pope Shenouda III.
- In the 1990s and as the service area had expanded, Pope Shenouda III consecrated Paul (Boulos) as General Bishop for Evangelism and Mission and Patriarchal Exarch in East and Central Africa.

Bishop Paul was originally a deacon then a celibate priest, he was then tonsured as a hieromonk before he was consecrated as a bishop. Both bishops were physicians before becoming full-time clergymen.

Here is a summary of the countries/churches under the jurisdiction of Bishop Antonius Markos according to his book "Come Across and Help Us, Book three", 2003 and under the jurisdiction of Bishop Paul according to the Mission Bishopric website:

Coptic Orthodoxy in Sub-Saharan Africa
Country	Region in Africa	Diocesan Bishop	Number of Churches/Institutions	Number of Clergy Members	Coptic Population
Kenya	Eastern Africa	Bishop Paul	+50 churches + 2 monasteries + 1 hospital	8 priests + 160 deacons	~2000 families (or 8000+ people)
South Africa	Southern Africa	Bishop Antonios Markos	12 churches + 1 school + 1 vocational training center	11 priests + ~120 deacons	~4500 families (or 15000+ people)
Democratic Rep. of Congo (Zaire)	Central Africa	Bishop Paul	8 churches + 3 schools	4 priests + 80 deacons	200 families (or ~1000 people)
Zambia	Southern Africa	Bishop Paul	4 churches + 1 hospital	3 priests + ~20 deacons	220 families (or ~1000 people)
Nigeria	West-central Africa	Bishop Paul	4 churches	temporary priest + 5 deacons	160 families (or 600+ people)
Tanzania	Southeastern Africa	Bishop Paul	4 churches + 1 medical center	1 priest + 12 deacons	45 families (or 150+ people)
Zimbabwe	Southern Africa	Bishop Antonios Markos	2 churches + 1 monastery + 1 vocational training center	1 priest	N/A
Namibia	Southern Africa	Bishop Antonios Markos	1 church + 1 vocational training center	1 priest	N/A
Ghana	West Africa	Bishop Antonios Markos	1 church + 1 vocational training center	1 priest	N/A
Ivory Coast	West Africa	Bishop Antonios Markos	1 church	1 priest	N/A
Togo	West Africa	Bishop Antonios Markos	1 church	1 priest	N/A
Botswana	Southern Africa	Bishop Antonios Markos	1 church	temporary priest	N/A
Lesotho	Southern Africa	Bishop Antonios Markos	1 church	temporary priest	N/A
Swaziland	Southern Africa	Bishop Antonios Markos	1 church	temporary priest	N/A
Total	Africa ^{1}	Bishop Markos and Bishop Paul ^{2}	65 churches + 3 monasteries + 2 hospitals + 4 schools + 4 vocational training centers + 1 medical center	28 priests + ~500 deacons	400,000+ people

Notes:

1: The region of "Africa", in this case, does not include Egypt, Ethiopia, Eritrea, Sudan, Libya, Tunisia, Algeria and Morocco, as these nations have several of their own Coptic bishops who shepherd their respective dioceses. In Ethiopia and Eritrea, their Churches have a recognized autocephalous status. Therefore, this table's data is solely on Sub-Saharan African countries.
2: Bishop Antonios Markos serves Southern and Western Africa, while Bishop Paul serves Eastern and Central Africa.

In 1984 a Coptic cross was given as a gift by the Coptic Orthodox Church of Alexandria and mounted on the top of the All Africa Conference of Churches building as the Coptic Orthodox Church of Alexandria is considered to be the Mother church in Africa.

== See also ==
- The Holy Synod of the Coptic Orthodox Patriarchate of Alexandria
- Oriental Orthodoxy
- Christianity in Africa
- Coptic Orthodox Church in Asia
- Coptic Orthodox Church in Australia
- Coptic Orthodox Church in the United States
- Coptic Orthodox Church in Canada
- Coptic Orthodox Church in Europe
- Coptic Orthodox Church in South America
