= Coptic Orthodox Church in Mexico =

The Coptic Orthodox Church in Mexico represents adherents, religious communities, institutions and organizations of Coptic Orthodox Church in Mexico.

Mexico has a growing Coptic Orthodox community, as it was less than one decade ago when some Coptic families settled in Mexico. The first Coptic Orthodox church in Mexico is St. Mary and St. Mark's Coptic Orthodox Church in Tlaycapan, Mexico. It was founded in 2001 and measures about 2000 square meters. The current priest is Father Zakaria Al Bramousy.

== See also ==
- Coptic
- Coptic Orthodox Church
- Coptic Orthodox Church in North America
  - List of Coptic Orthodox Churches in the United States
    - St. Mark Coptic Orthodox Church (Jersey City, New Jersey)
    - St. Mark Coptic Orthodox Church (Los Angeles)
    - St. Mary Coptic Orthodox Church (Los Angeles)
    - St. Abraam Coptic Orthodox Church (Woodbury, New York)
- Religion in North America
- Coptic diaspora
- Oriental Orthodoxy in North America
