= Coptic Orthodox Church in Malaysia =

Oriental Orthodox Christian church in Malaysia

The Coptic Orthodox Church in Malaysia is an Oriental Orthodox Christian church in Malaysia. It comes under the episcopal jurisdiction of the Coptic Orthodox Diocese of Sydney and its Affiliated Regions, a diocese of the Coptic Orthodox Church of Alexandria.

The Coptic Orthodox Church in Malaysia currently operates in Kuala Lumpur known as the Coptic Orthodox Church in Kuala Lumpur, in Malacca known as the St. Mary & St. Mark Church and more recently in Kota Kinabalu.

The Coptic Orthodox Church in Malaysia is an affiliate member of the Council of Churches of Malaysia.

== See also ==
- Coptic Orthodox Church in Asia
- Coptic diaspora
- Orthodox Syrian Church in Malaysia
