= Orthodox Church in America (disambiguation) =

The Orthodox Church in America (OCA) is an Eastern Orthodox church in North America that has recognized autocephalous jurisdiction by some Eastern Orthodox churches.

Orthodox Church in America or Orthodox Church of America may also refer to:

== Eastern Orthodoxy ==
- Eastern Orthodoxy in North America, referring to jurisdictions of all Eastern Orthodox Churches in North America
- Eastern Orthodox Church in the United States of America, referring to jurisdictions of all Eastern Orthodox Churches in the United States of America
- Greek Orthodox Church in the United States of America, referring to jurisdictions of the Patriarchate of Constantinople in the United States of America
- Serbian Orthodox Church in North and South America, referring to all Serbian Orthodox Church jurisdictions in the Americas
- Antiochian Orthodox Christian Archdiocese of North America, the Greek Orthodox Church of Antioch in the U.S. and Canada
- Ukrainian Orthodox Church of the USA - is a jurisdiction of the Ecumenical Patriarchate in the United States.

== Oriental Orthodoxy ==
- Oriental Orthodox Churches in North America, communion of all Oriental Orthodox Churches in North America
- Oriental Orthodox Churches in the United States of America, communion of all Oriental Orthodox Churches in the United States of America
- Oriental Orthodox Churches in South America, communion of all Oriental Orthodox Churches in South America
- Coptic Orthodox Church in South America, referring to all Coptic Orthodox Church jurisdictions in South America
- Coptic Orthodox Church in North America, referring to all Coptic Orthodox Church jurisdictions in North America
- Coptic Orthodox Church in the United States, referring to all Coptic Orthodox Church jurisdictions in the U.S.

== Other churches ==
- Orthodox-Catholic Church of America
- American Orthodox Catholic Church
- Moorish Orthodox Church of America
- Holy Orthodox Church in North America
- Ethiopian Orthodox Coptic Church of North and South America

== See also ==
- Orthodox Church (disambiguation)
