= Coptic Orthodox Church in Asia =

The Coptic Orthodox Church of Alexandria has many churches and congregations in the continent of Asia.

All of the Coptic Orthodox Eparchies in the Sinai Peninsula are in Asia.

== Sinai ==
There are two Eparchies, each led by a Bishop:

=== El Arish and all North Sinai ===
Kosman (Cosmas), Bishop of the Holy Diocese of El Arish (Rhinocorura), El Qantarah and all North Sinai.

=== El-Tor and all South Sinai ===
Apollo, Bishop of the Holy Diocese of El-Tor (Raithu), Sharm El Sheikh and all South Sinai.

Coptic Orthodox churches in South Sinai

- Moses the Prophet & St Mark; EL-TOR, South Sinai
- El Sama-eyeen; HAY AL NOOR, Sharm El Sheikh Video360 on YouTube
- St John The Beloved & The Baptist; NEWABAA, Sharm El Sheikh
- St Mary & St Mina; OM EL SEED, Sharm El Sheikh
- St George & St Mina; RAS SEDR, South Sinai

== Jerusalem ==
Abraham, Metropolitan of the Holy and Great City of Our Lord, Jerusalem, Holy Zion, Archbishop of the Holy Archdiocese of Jerusalem, All Palestine, Philadelphia of Jordan and all the Near East.

This Archdiocese has many churches in the Palestinian Authority, Lebanon, Syria, Iraq, Iran, Kuwait, the United Arab Emirates, Qatar, Bahrain, Oman, Yemen, Saudi Arabia, and Israel.

This great archdiocesan Metropolis is technically outside the Egyptian Province and was not originally counted within the jurisdiction of the Pope of Alexandria and it was created by Pope Cyril III (1235-1243) in the Thirteenth Century, which, at that time, had caused a dispute between the Coptic Orthodox Church of Alexandria and the Syriac Orthodox Church of Antioch. This was a very rare incident between the two sister churches as in general their relationship is one of the strongest between any two sister churches.

The Coptic Orthodox Metropolitan of Jerusalem is the only Coptic Orthodox Metropolitan who is consecrated as a Metropolitan Archbishop without being consecrated a bishop first and then elevated to the Metropolitan rank later, as is the norm in all episcopal consecration according to the tradition of the Church of Alexandria. This has been the case since Cyril III consecrated Metropolitan Basilius as the first Coptic Orthodox Metropolitan of Jerusalem and All the Near East.

== Lebanon ==
The Coptic Orthodox Church is one of the 18 religious sects recognized by the Lebanese Constitution.

== East Asia ==
This wide area comes under the Diocese of Sydney and its Affiliated Regions, whose Hierarch is Daniel, Bishop of the Holy Diocese of Sydney, New South Wales, Queensland, Northern Territory, Thailand, Singapore and All East Asia. The following is a list of churches in East Asia under the jurisdiction of the Diocese, and also the priests who serve in each church:

=== China ===
- St. Mary & Archangel Michael; Guangzhou
- St. Mark; Yiwu

=== Hong Kong ===
- St. Thomas', Hong Kong, located in Sheung Wan.

=== Japan ===
The Coptic Orthodox Church of Alexandria was first established in Japan by Bishop Daniel in 2004. Bishop Daniel is the Coptic Orthodox bishop of the Diocese of Sydney and Affiliated Regions, including Asia. He appointed the first serving Coptic priest in Japan in 2004 who served St. George Coptic Orthodox church in Japan, although a church building was not established yet.

The first Coptic Orthodox holy liturgy was held in Kobe City, Japan in May 2004 by Bishop Daniel. Other areas were Coptic Orthodox holy liturgies were held were in Osaka, Kagoshima (south of Japan), Tokyo (capital city of Japan) and Tottori (western part of Japan).

On July 18, 2016, the first Coptic Orthodox church building in Japan was officially established by the Diocese of Sydney and affiliated region, in Kizugawa city, in Kyoto prefecture (western part of Japan). It was named St. Mary & St. Mark Coptic Orthodox church. The Coptic Orthodox church in Japan is an official member of JCCC (Japan Confederation of Christian Churches). The official website of the church is www.japancopticchurch.org The new homepage address is https://www.japancopticchurch.com/.

=== Korea ===
- St. Mary; Seoul

In 2011, Coptic immigrants in Korea formed a Coptic Orthodox community in Korea. The responsible priest is Fr. Philopateer Wadie.

The church address in Seoul, Mapo-gu, Nogosan-dong, 40-51.

https://www.facebook.com/stmarycoptickorea/

There also are small communities in Pohang and Gyeongju.

=== Taiwan ===
- St. George & St. Mina; Taipei

== Southeast Asia ==
This wide area comes under Bishop Rewies, General Bishop for the Southeast Region. The following is a list of churches in Southeast under the jurisdiction of the Him, and also the priests that serve in each church:

=== Indonesia ===
Under Coordinator Of Fr. John Edward, Mission Start In 2014 In Jakarta.

- St. Mary, Jakarta
- St. Mark & Virgin Mary, Surabaya
- Archangel Michael & St. Moses the Black, Malang

=== Malaysia ===
The Coptic Orthodox Church in Malaysia currently has only one organised community in Malacca, known as the St. Mary & St. Mark Church, located in Ayer Keroh, which is served by Fr. Joseph Sim. The Coptic Orthodox Church in Malaysia is an affiliate member of the Council of Churches of Malaysia.

=== Philippines ===
- St. Mary & St. Mark Coptic Orthodox Church Manila
  - Abouna Mina
- Saint Mark Coptic Orthodox Church, Tacloban
  - Abouna Keryllos

=== Singapore ===
- St. Mark; Singapore

=== Thailand ===
The Coptic Orthodox Church of Thailand is under the leadership of His Grace Bishop Daniel and is served under the coordination of Abouna Youhanna Bestawros as the priest ministering the mission in Thailand, assisted by missionary Deacon Barnabas.

- St. Mark & St. George; Bangkok
- St. Mary Welfare House; Sangkhlaburi

== South Asia ==
=== India ===
In 2022, the Coptic Orthodox Church opened its first church in India, in the city of Jalandhar, in Punjab. The parish also included a charity playschool.

- St. Mary Coptic Orthodox Church; Jalandhar

=== Pakistan ===
A small Mission church in Islamabad of only 10 families started in 2006 under the Diocese of Melbourne, West & South Australia, New Zealand and All Oceania whose bishop was Anba Suriel, Bishop of the Holy Diocese of Melbourne, Victoria (Australia), Tasmania, ACT, South Australia, Western Australia, New Zealand and All Oceania. As of July 2014, the churches were under the direct governance of Pope Tawadros II with Fr. Daoud Lamei as the liaison.

The following is a list of churches in Pakistan which are under the Diocese, and also the priests that serve in each church:

- St. Mark Coptic Orthodox Church; Rawalpindi
  - Fr Bishoy Sarfraz

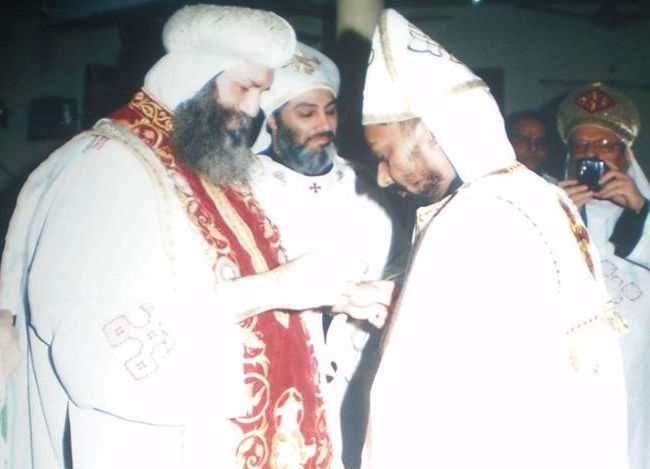
Fr Bishoy Ordination by H.G Bishop Suriel (2006)

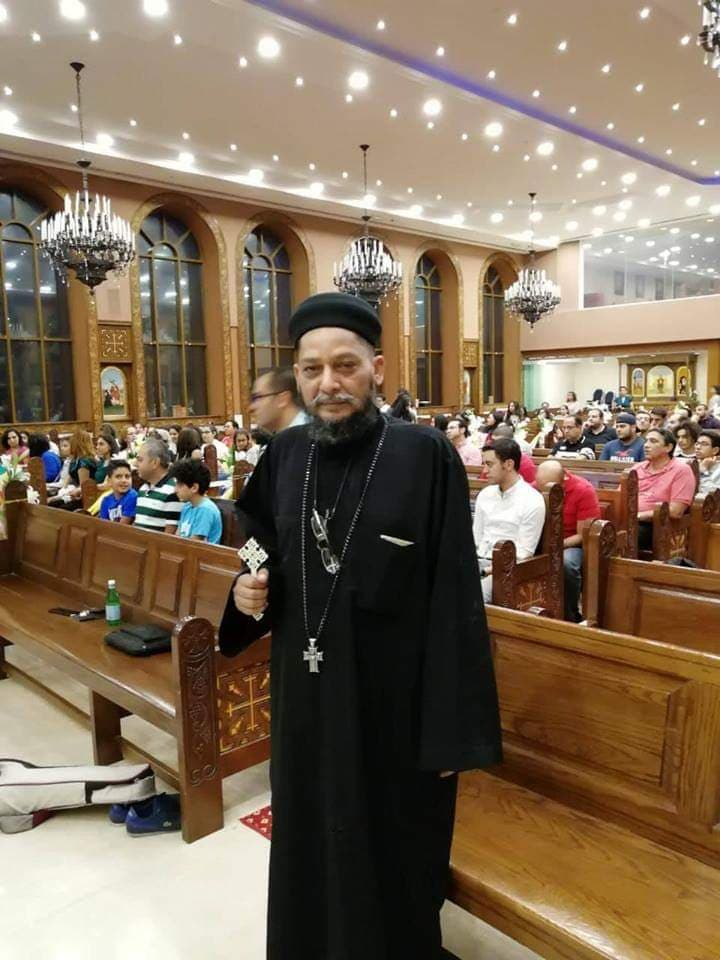

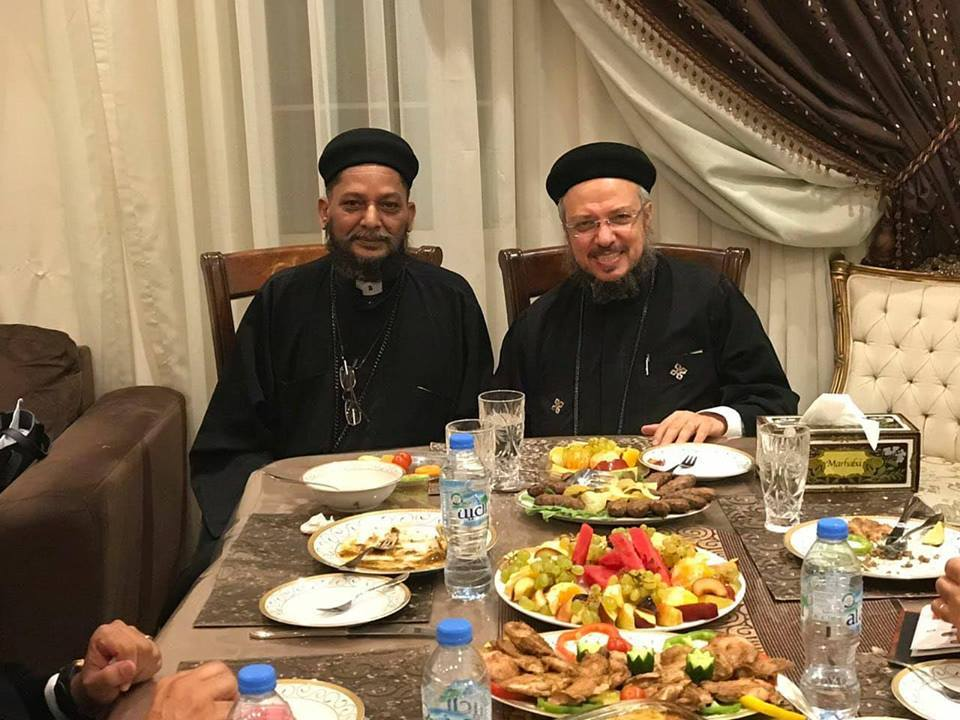
Fr Bishoy Official Visit to Abouna Daoud

- St. Mary's Coptic Orthodox Church; Islamabad
  - Fr Anthony David John

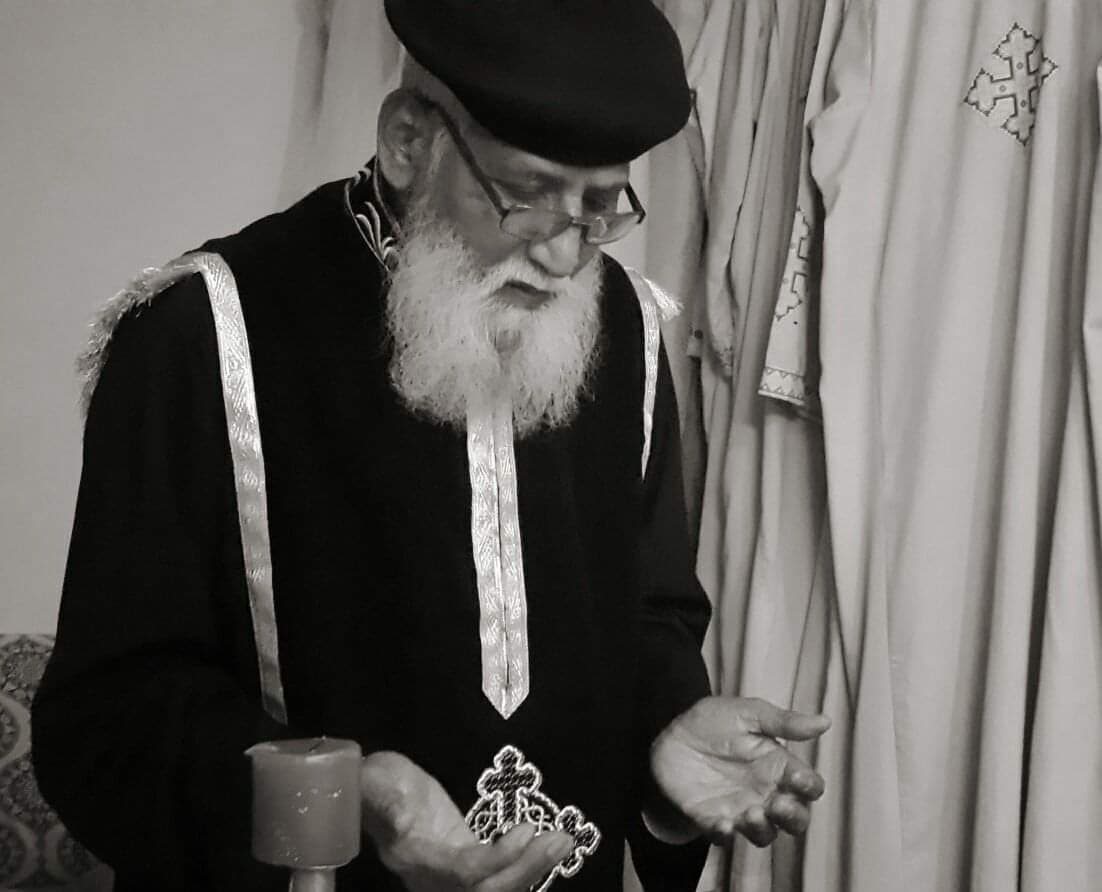
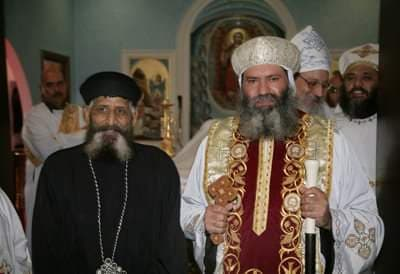

=== Bangladesh ===
The Coptic Orthodox Church has a parish in Dhaka, Bangladesh. The parish is located in the Farmgate area of Dhaka and is served by Fr. Markus Safwat Farid.

The following is a list of Coptic Orthodox churches in Bangladesh:

- Saint Mark Coptic Orthodox Church; Dhaka
  - Farmgate, Dhaka, Bangladesh

== See also ==
- Coptic diaspora
- Dioceses of the Coptic Orthodox Church

== See also ==
- Coptic Orthodox Church of Alexandria
- The Holy Synod of the Coptic Orthodox Patriarchate of Alexandria
- Oriental Orthodoxy
- Christianity in Africa
- Coptic Orthodox Church in Africa
- Coptic Orthodox Church in Australia
- Coptic Orthodox Church in the United States
- Coptic Orthodox Church in Canada
- Coptic Orthodox Church in Europe
- Coptic Orthodox Church in South America
