= List of Coptic Orthodox churches in Canada =

The following is a partial list of Coptic Orthodox Churches in Canada. The count stands at 70 churches and communities.

== Diocese of Mississauga, Vancouver & Western Canada ==
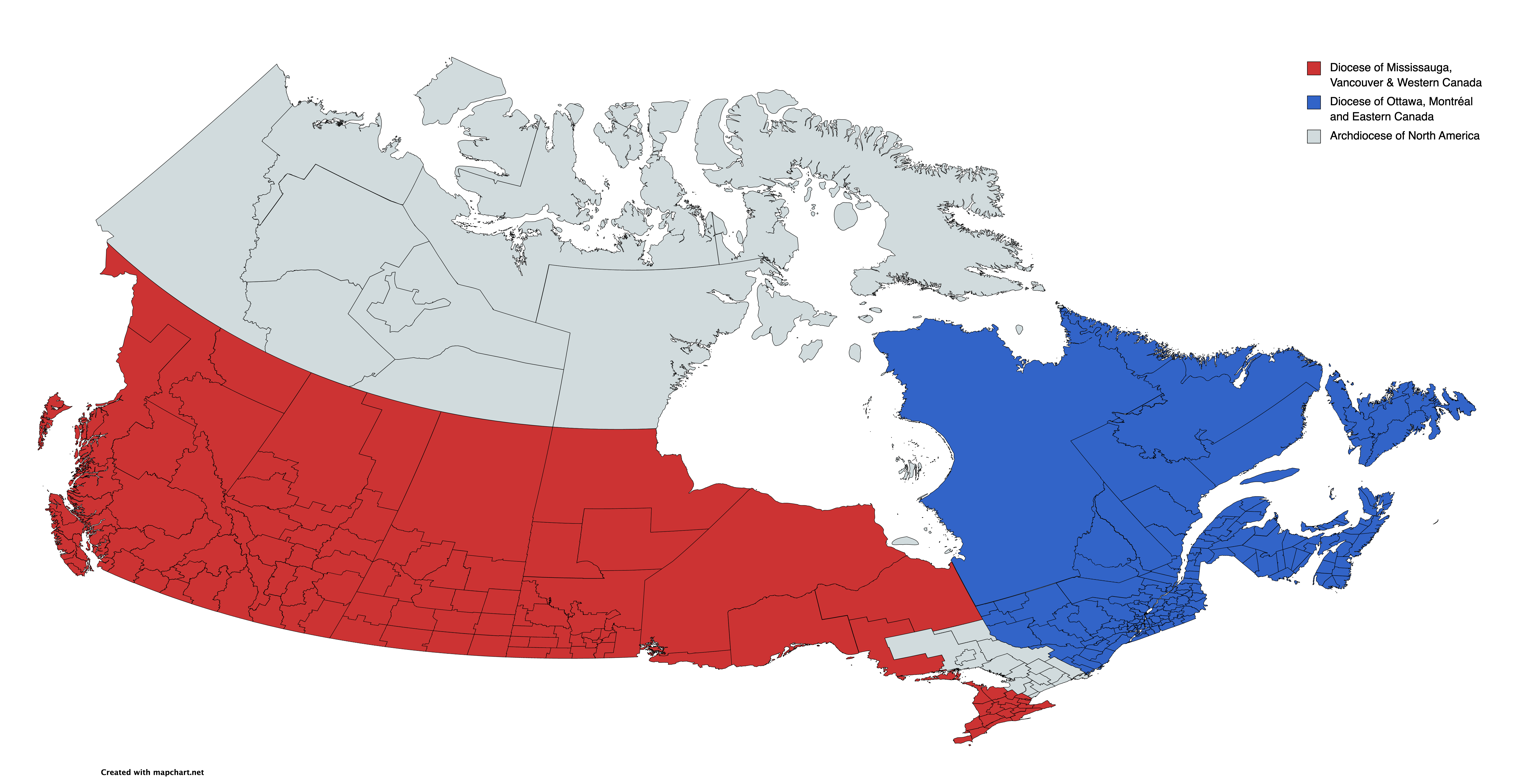
Map of the Coptic Orthodox Dioceses and Jurisdictions in Canada.

The Hierarch of this diocese is Bishop Mina, Bishop of the Holy Diocese of Mississauga, Vancouver & Western Canada.

The following is a list of the churches under the diocese:

=== Alberta ===
- St. Mary & St. George Coptic Orthodox Church, Red Deer
- St. Mary & St. Mark Coptic Orthodox Church, Edmonton
- St. Mina Coptic Orthodox Church, Calgary
- St. Mary & St. Paul Coptic Orthodox Church, Calgary

=== British Columbia ===
- St. George Coptic Orthodox Church, Surrey (Burned)
- St. Mark & St. Philopateer Coptic Orthodox Church, Vancouver
- St. Mary Coptic Orthodox Church, Surrey
- St. Pope Cyrill Coptic Orthodox Church, Vancouver Island

=== Manitoba ===
- St. Mark Coptic Orthodox Church, Winnipeg
- St. Mina & St. Anthony Coptic Orthodox Church, Brandon

=== Ontario (Mississauga & Western Ontario) ===
- SEE BELOW FOR EASTERN ONTARIO CHURCHES
- SEE FURTHER BELOW FOR OTHER CHURCHES IN THE GREATER TORONTO AREA
- Archangel Michael & St. Tekla Coptic Orthodox Church, Brampton
- Archangel Raphael and St. Marina Coptic Orthodox Church, Burlington
- St. Philopateer Mercurius Coptic Orthodox Church, Guelph
- St. Mina Coptic Orthodox Church, Hamilton
- St. Mary & St Maurice Coptic Orthodox Church, Kitchener
- St. Paul the Anchorite Coptic Orthodox Church, London
- St. George & St. Abanoub Coptic Orthodox Church, Milton
- The 7 altars Coptic Church, Mississauga
- Canadian Coptic Orthodox Church of the Nativity, Mississauga
- Canadian Coptic Orthodox Church of the Resurrection, Mississauga
- St. Mark and St. Demiana Coptic Orthodox Church, Mississauga
- St. Maximus & St. Dometius Coptic Orthodox Chapel, Mississauga
- St. Mina & St. Kyrillos Coptic Orthodox Church, Mississauga
- St. Philopateer & St. Anthony Coptic Orthodox Church, Mississauga
- The Prophet Daniel & the Three Saintly Youth Coptic Orthodox Church, Mississauga
- Virgin Mary & St. Athanasius Coptic Orthodox Church, Mississauga

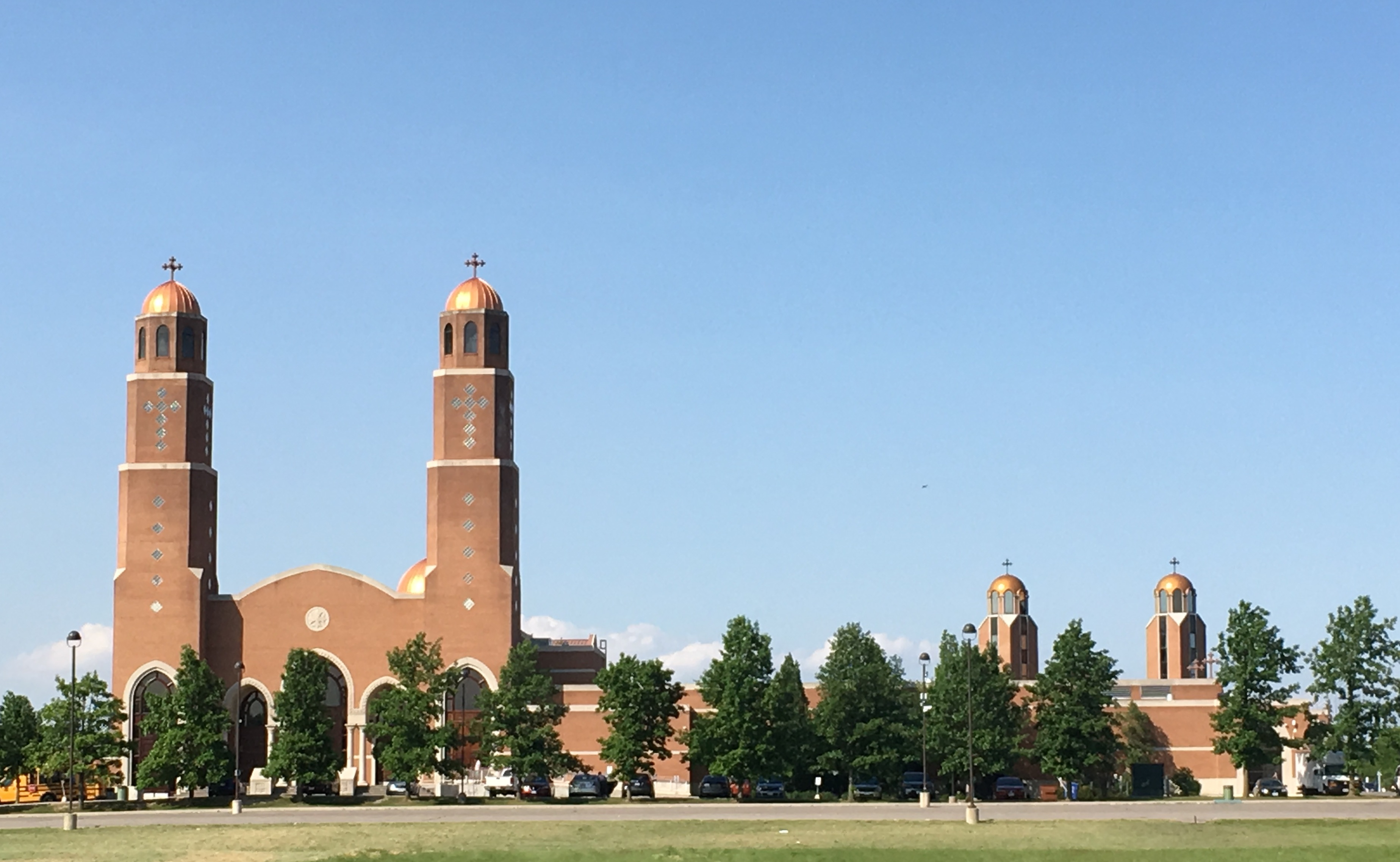
Virgin Mary and St. Athanasius Church and Canadian Coptic Centre, Mississauga

- The Valley of the Mother of God, Mono
- St. Peter and St. Paul Coptic Orthodox Church, Oakville
- St. George & St. Mercurius Abu Sefein Coptic Orthodox Church, St. Catharines
- St. Mary & St. Moses the Black Coptic Orthodox Church, Windsor

=== Saskatchewan ===
- St. Mark & St. George Coptic Orthodox Church, Regina
- St. Mary & St. Mina Coptic Orthodox Church, Saskatoon

== Diocese of Ottawa, Montréal and Eastern Canada ==
The Hierarch of this diocese is Bishop Boulos, Bishop of the Holy Diocese of Ottawa, Montreal & Eastern Canada.

The following is a list of the churches under the diocese:

=== New Brunswick ===
- Holy Virgin Mary & St. George Coptic Orthodox Church, Saint John

=== Newfoundland and Labrador ===
- St. Maurice Coptic Orthodox Church, Mount Pearl
- St. Mary & St. Verena Coptic Orthodox Church, Gander
- Coptic Community, Grand Falls
- Coptic Community, Corner Brook

=== Nova Scotia ===
- St. Mena Coptic Orthodox Church, Halifax

=== Ontario (Eastern Ontario) ===
- St. Anthony Monastery, Perth
- St. George & St. Anthony Coptic Orthodox Church, Ottawa
- St. Joseph Coptic Orthodox Church, Ottawa
- St. Mark & St. Mary of Egypt Coptic Orthodox Church, Ottawa (Mission Church)
- St. Mary Coptic Orthodox Church, Ottawa
- St. Mina Coptic Orthodox Church, Kingston

=== Québec ===
- St. Mark Coptic Orthodox Church, Montreal
- St. George & St. Joseph Coptic Orthodox Church, Pierrefonds
- Virgin Mary Coptic Orthodox Church, Saint-Hubert
- Archangel Michael & St. Mercorios Coptic Orthodox Church, Laval
- St. Peter & St. Paul Coptic Orthodox Church, Pointe-Claire (Mission Church)
- Virgin Mary, St. Mina & Pope Kyrillos Coptic Orthodox Church, Sainte-Foy
- St. Mina & Pope Cyril VI Coptic Orthodox Church, Sainte-Thérèse
- Holy Trinity Eritrean Orthodox Church, Lachine
- St. John the Baptist Coptic Orthodox Church, Vaudreuil-Dorion

== Archdiocese of Toronto ==
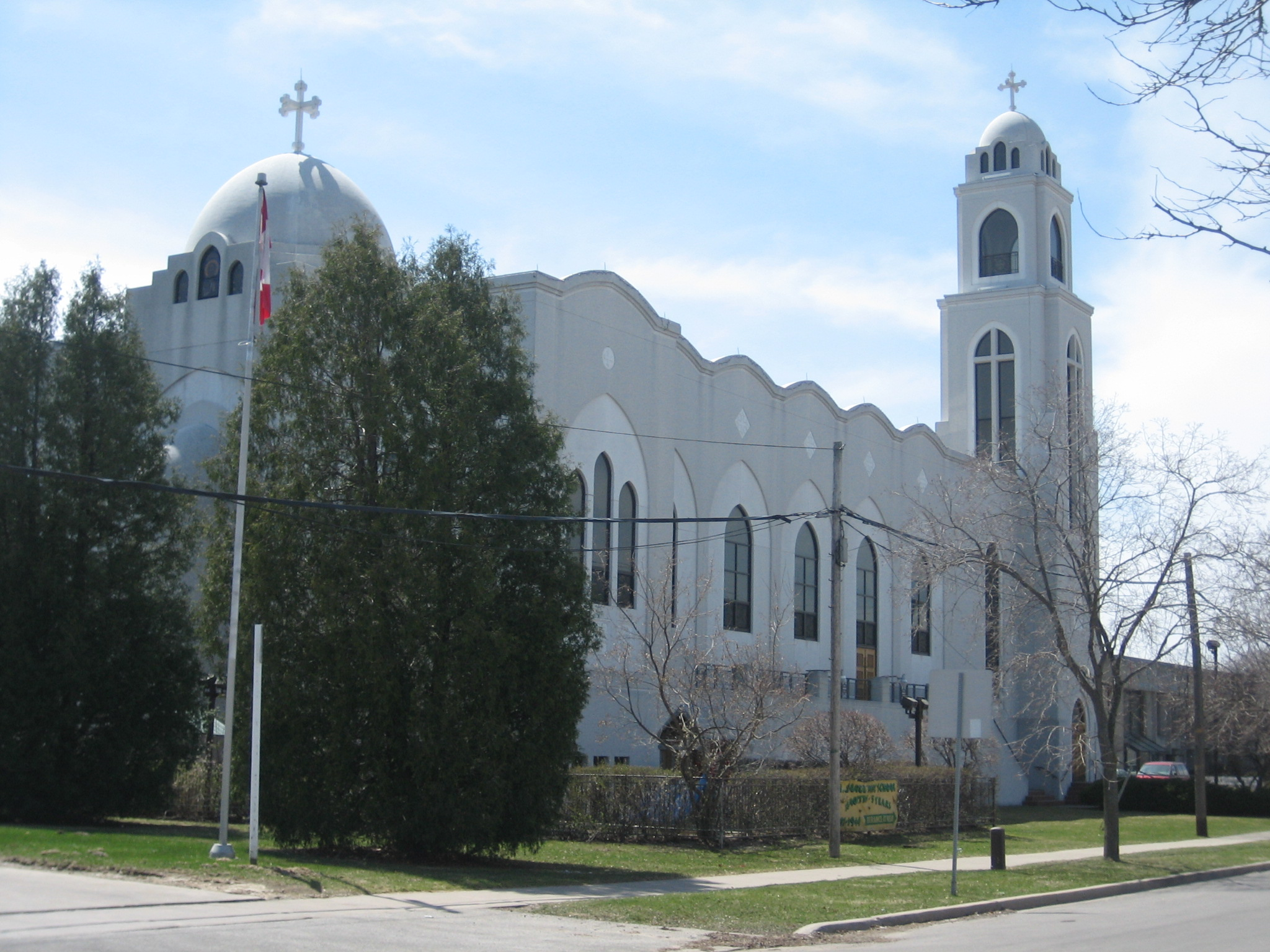
St. George & St. Rueiss Coptic Orthodox Church in Toronto

The Hierarch of this archdiocese is Bishop Archilids, Bishop of the Holy Archdiocese of Toronto.

The following is a list of the churches under the Archdiocese of Toronto:

=== Ontario ===
- Archangel Michael & St. Mina Coptic Orthodox Church, North York, Toronto
- St. Bishoy Coptic Orthodox Church, Stouffville
- St. George & St. Rueiss Coptic Orthodox Church, North York, Toronto
- St. John the Baptist & St. Elizabeth Coptic Orthodox Church, Oro-Medonte
- St. Mark Coptic Orthodox Church, Toronto
- St. Mark's Coptic Orthodox Cathedral, Markham
- St. Mary & St. Abraam Coptic Orthodox Church, Ajax
- St. Mary & St. John the Beloved Coptic Orthodox Church, Pickering
- St. Mary & St. Joseph Coptic Orthodox Church, Richmond Hill
- St. Mary & St. Samuel the Confessor Coptic Orthodox Church, Markham
- St. Maurice & St. Verena Coptic Orthodox Church, Markham
- St. Moses & St. Katherine Coptic Orthodox Church, Toronto
- St. Philopateer Mercurius & St. Shenouda Coptic Orthodox Church, North York, Toronto
- Ti Agia Maria & St. Demiana Coptic Orthodox Church, Etobicoke, Toronto
- Virgin Mary & The Apostles Peter & Paul Coptic Orthodox Church, Vaughan
- St. Philopateer and St. Demiana Coptic Orthodox Church, Newmarket
- St. Mary and St. Mark Coptic Orthodox Church, Sudbury

== Gallery ==
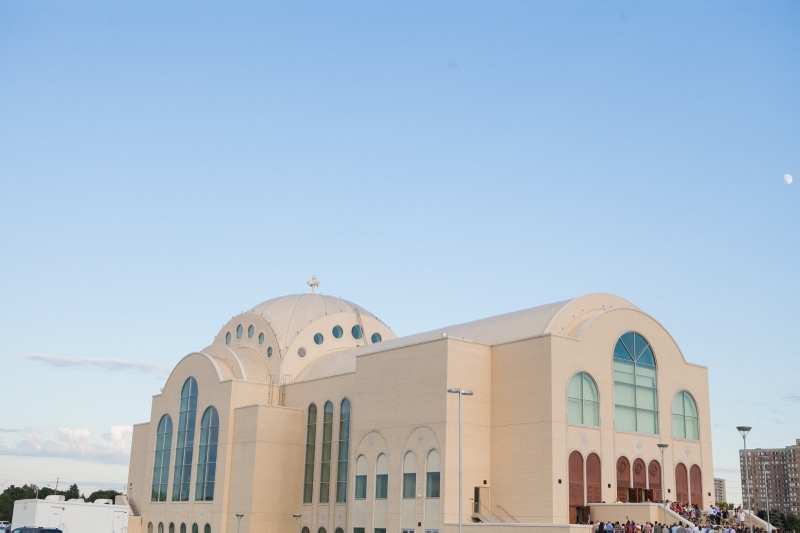
St. Mary and St. Mark Coptic Orthodox Cathedral of Markham

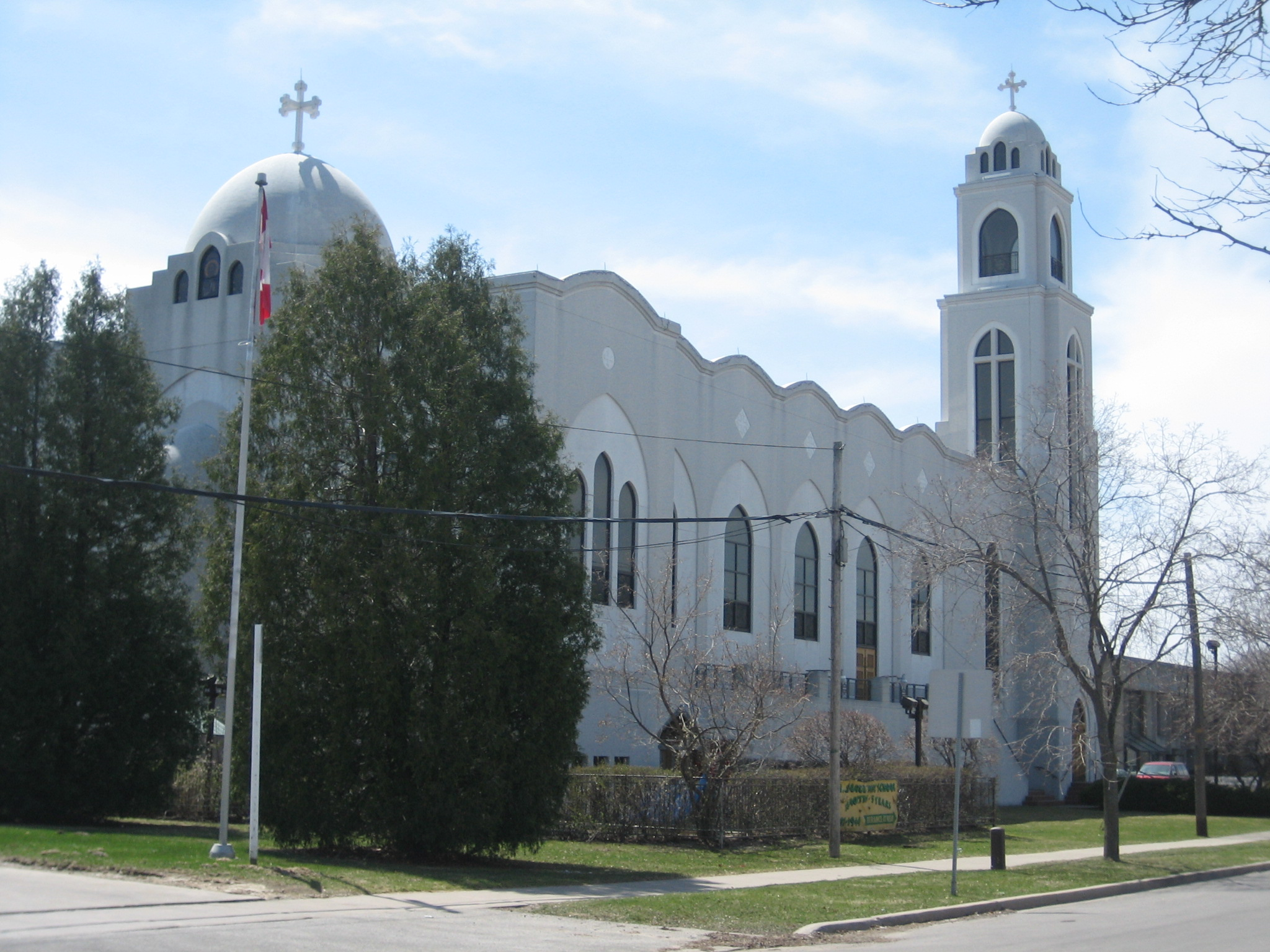
Sts. George & Rueiss Coptic Orthodox Church of Toronto

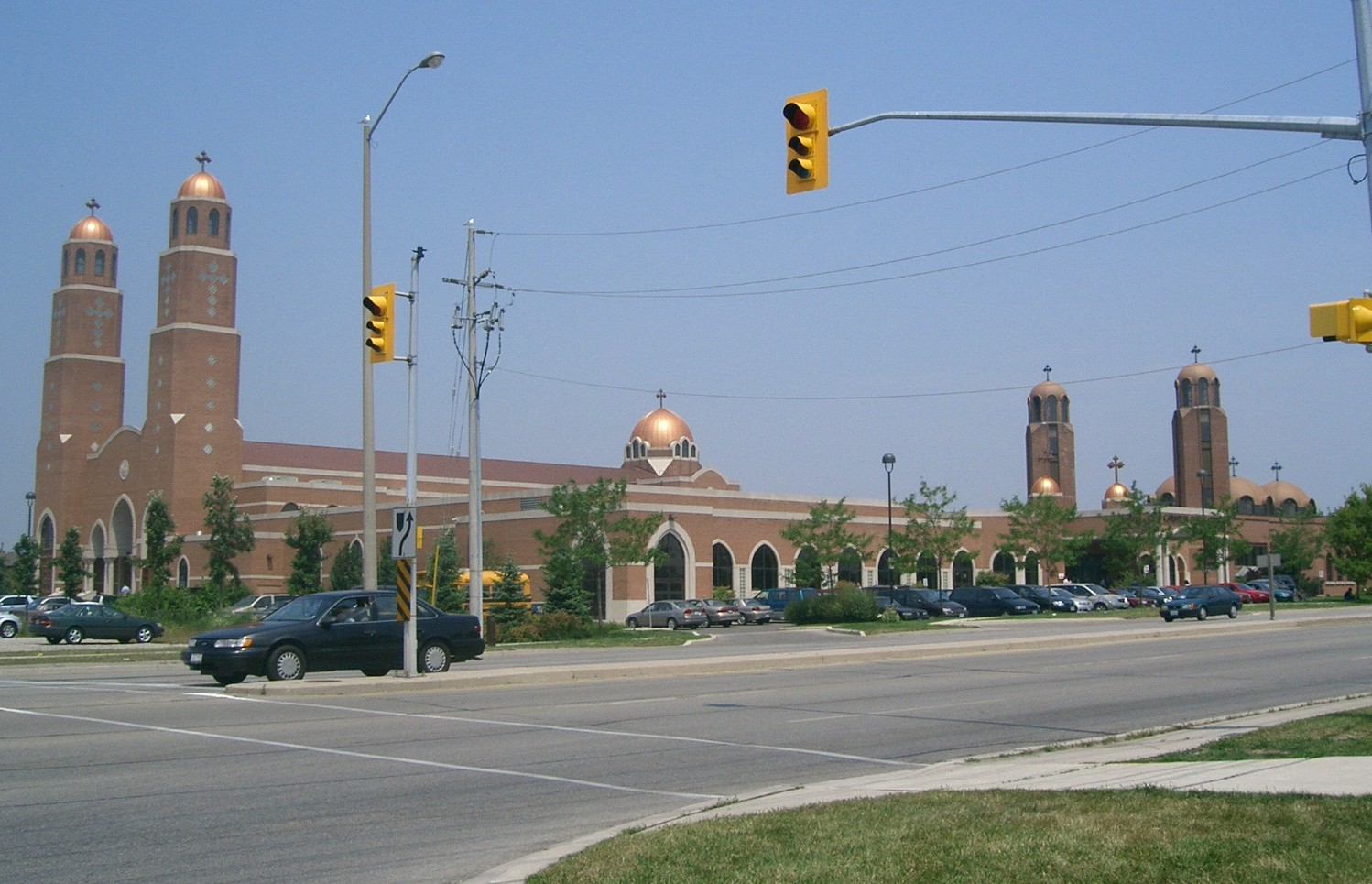
Virgin Mary & St. Athanasius Coptic Orthodox Church of Mississauga

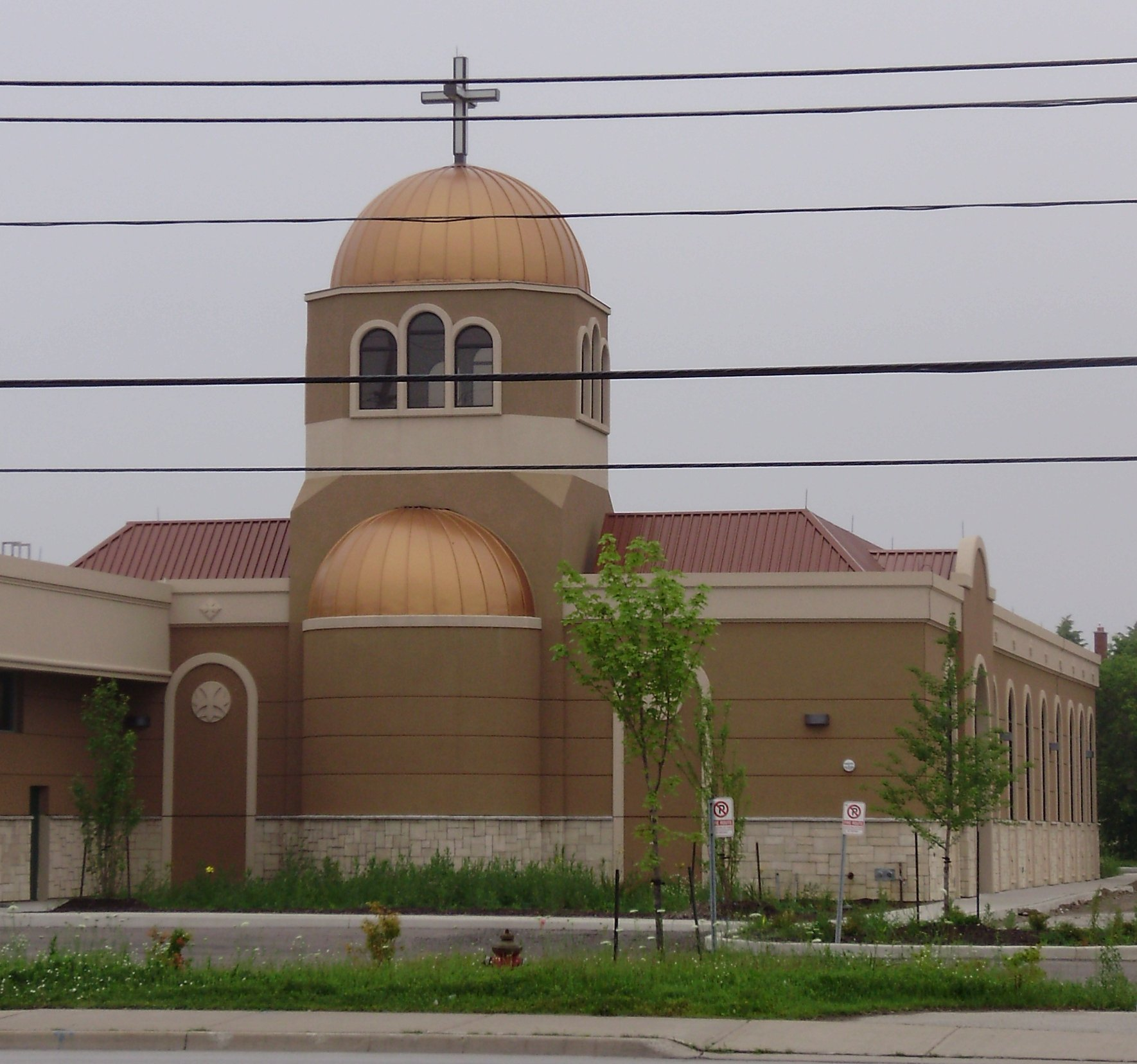
Sts. Mina & Kryillos Coptic Orthodox Church of Mississauga

== See also ==
- Coptic (disambiguation)
- Coptic Canadians
- Coptic Orthodox Church
- Coptic Orthodox Church in North America
  - Coptic Orthodox Church in the United States
    - List of Coptic Orthodox churches in the United States
  - Coptic Orthodox Church in Canada
- Oriental Orthodoxy in North America
