= Canada–Egypt relations =

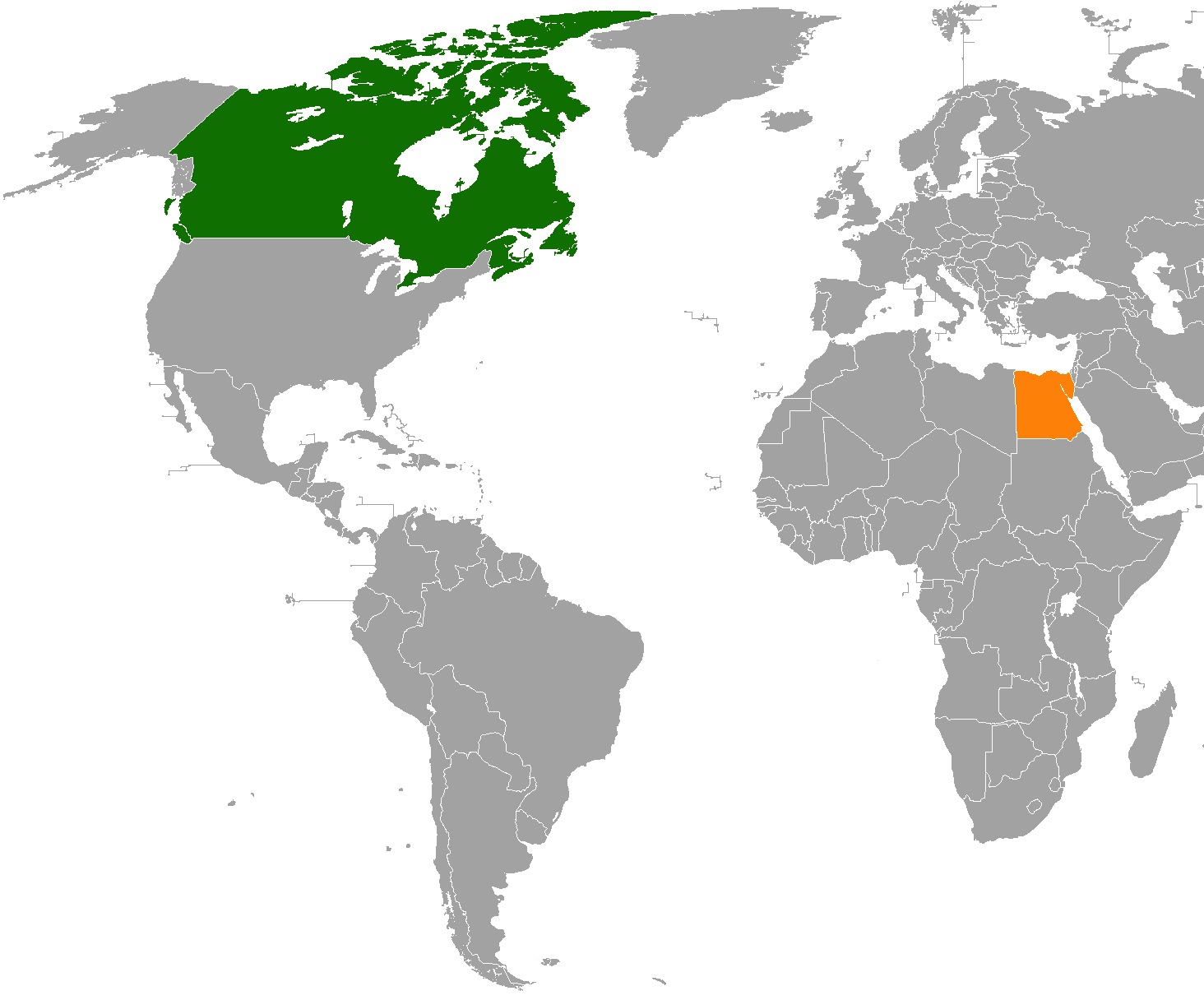

- Canada: Egypt

The Canada–Egypt relations are the bilateral relations between Canada and Egypt. Both countries established embassies in their respective capitals in 1954. Canada has an embassy in Cairo. Egypt has an embassy in Ottawa and a Consulate-General in Montreal. Though both had been part of the British Empire, only Canada is part of the Commonwealth, while Egypt is not.

== History ==
Canada and Egypt first established diplomatic ties in 1954 after the Egyptian Revolution of 1952 and the abdication of the Egyptian monarchy, thus creating the Republic of Egypt under President Jamal Abdel Nasser. Both established embassies in their respective capitals, a Canadian one in Cairo and with the Egyptian Embassy located in Ottawa. The countries enjoyed good relations but did not take prominence to each other until Canada intervened in the Suez Crisis of 1956, which started by when Nasser nationalizing the Suez Canal. In response, France, the United Kingdom, and Israel took military actions against Egypt.

Canada decried the actions taken against Egypt, and after the end of hostilities, the Canadian Minister of External Affairs, Lester B. Pearson proposed that the United Nations create a United Nations Emergency Force (UNEF), whose mission would be enter Egyptian territory and act as a buffer between Egyptian forces and Israeli forces in the occupied territory. Canada pledged a substantial number of troops to the UNEF mission. On May 16, 1967, Egypt ordered all UNEF forces out of Egyptian territory, and most had retreated before the beginning of the Six-Day War.

Canada provided aid to Egypt. Official development assistance (ODA) from Canada to Egypt is estimated US$17 million in 2010–2011. Aid has been targeted at microfinancing; helping private sector growth in small enterprises; and funding for apprenticeships, training, and literacy.

The word "coup" appeared in the title of a 2013 article posted on the Canadian government's website reporting on a statement made by Foreign Minister John Baird regarding the removal from office of the short-ruled Egyptian President Mohamed Morsi in July 2013 following mass protests against his rule. However, Baird himself did not use the term to describe Morsi's removal from office, and he neither condemned it nor called for Morsi's rule to be restored.

In October 2023, Egypt revoked visa-on-arrival and e-Visa eligibility for Canadian citizens by citing reciprocity in response to the alleged arbitrary denial of Canadian visas for Egyptian citizens, but nullified pre-arrival visa requirements again starting December 2024.

== See also ==
- Foreign relations of Canada
- Foreign relations of Egypt
- Egyptian Canadians
