= Orthodox Syrian Church in Malaysia =

Church in Malaysia

The Orthodox Syrian Church in Malaysia is an Oriental Orthodox Christian church in Malaysia. It comes under the episcopal jurisdiction of the Malankara Orthodox Syrian Church's Diocese of Asia Pacific, led by Metropolitan Yuhanon Mar Diascoros.

Oriental Orthodox migrant workers from India formed the first organised groups that met to worship in the Young Men's Christian Association in Kuala Lumpur in the 1920s. In 1932, the group was registered as the Syrian Christian Union. The first priest was appointed in 1936 when T. I. Joseph was appointed vicar for Malaya.

In 1984, Fr. Philip Thomas was ordained as the first Malaysian Oriental Orthodox priest by Thomas Mar Thimotheos, Metropolitan of the Diocese of Malabar.

The Orthodox Syrian Church in Malaysia currently has six congregations in Malaysia and is a full member of the Council of Churches of Malaysia.

== See also ==
- Coptic Orthodox Church in Malaysia
