= Coptic Orthodox Church in Canada =

Religious organisation

The immigration of the Copts to Canada might have started as early as the late 1950s. Due to an increasing amount of discrimination towards Copts in Egypt in the 1970s and low income in Egypt. Canada has been receiving a greater number of these immigrants, and the number of Coptic immigrants into Canada has been growing ever since.

== Membership ==
Statistics Canada has reported a rise in the number of Coptic Orthodox Christians in Canada. Statistics Canada's National Household Survey reported:

- In the 1991 Census: 5,020
- In the 2001 Census: 10,280
- In the 2011 Census: 16,255

== History ==
In 1964, St. Mark Coptic Orthodox Church was established in Toronto; this was the first Coptic parish established in the Coptic diaspora.

In 2002, a survey showed 22 Coptic Orthodox parishes in Canada, indicating growth.

In 2011, there were five Coptic Orthodox churches in Montreal.

In 2021, there were 70 Coptic Orthodox Churches in 3 Dioceses.

== Episcopacy ==
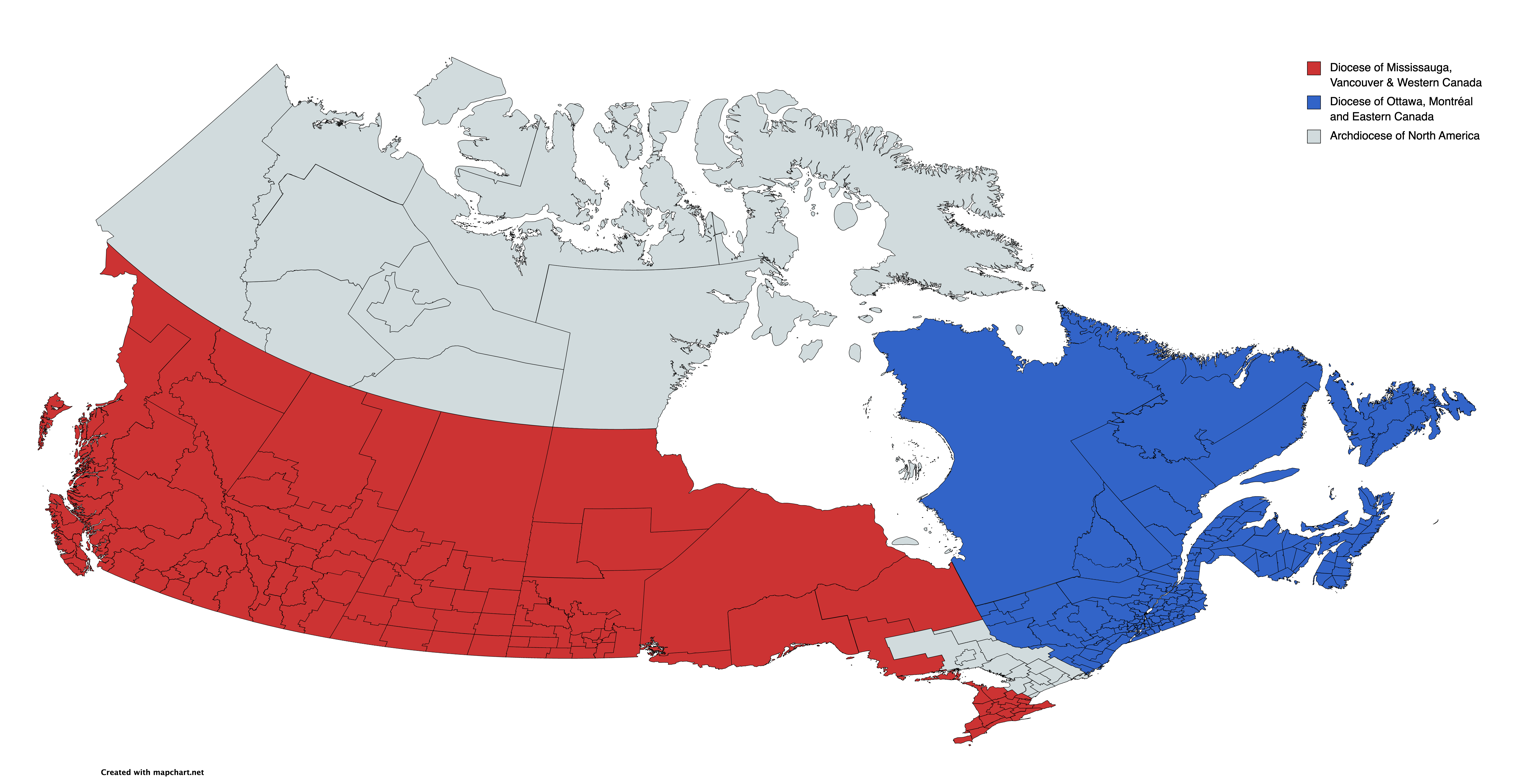
Map of the Coptic Orthodox Dioceses and Jurisdictions in Canada

=== Diocesan bishops ===
- Mina, Bishop of the Holy Diocese of Mississauga, Vancouver & Western Canada. (2013 - Present)
- Boules, Bishop of the Holy Diocese of Ottawa, Montréal & Eastern Canada. (2019 - Present)

=== General bishops ===
- Archelides, General Bishop in Toronto (GTA) and Central Canada, assistant to the Pope. (2022 - 2025)

== Dioceses ==
=== Archdiocese of North America ===
Before the establishment of any dioceses in the US and Canada, all churches were part of the Archdiocese of North America under the direct care of the Patriarchate of Alexandria, led by the Pope of Alexandria. All churches and regions that are not under the jurisdiction of an established diocese are part of the Archdiocese. Throughout the years the Archdiocese has been served by Patriarchal Exarchs, and General Bishops based in Cedar Grove, New Jersey. In June of 2022, Bishop Archelides was consecrated as a General Bishop, to assist the Pope in serving the Archdiocese of North America in Canada, especially in the regions where Church's are already established, namely in the Greater Toronto Area, and Central Canada.

=== Diocese of Mississauga, Vancouver & Western Canada ===
The Diocese was established by the enthronement of Bishop Mina, by the order of Pope Tawadros II, in March of 2013.

The Diocese comprises the following provinces:

- Mississauga and the Western Towns and Cities in the Province of Ontario
- Manitoba
- Saskatchewan
- Alberta
- British Columbia

The diocese contains about 28 parishes, the Convent of Saint Mary, Saint George and Saint Philopater, the Monastery of Saint George and Saint Paul the Anchorite, and a retreat center.

=== Diocese of Ottawa, Montréal & Eastern Canada ===
The Diocese was established by the consecration of Bishop Boules by the hands of Pope Tawadros II, in June of 2019.

The Diocese comprises the following provinces:

- Ontario, East of Kingston
- Quebec
- New Brunswick
- Nova Scotia
- Prince Edward Island
- Newfoundland and Labrador

== Church Activities ==
Apart from the Divine Liturgy, many of the Coptic churches in Canada offer other services to their congregation, such as Choir, Sunday School, Youth Group, Bible Study, Coptic Language Classes, Hymnology classes, etc. These services help to keep the youth as active members of the Church, and serve to maintain an involved Church community. Church websites usually have a list of the services they offer, and on which days they take place.

== See also ==
- List of Coptic Orthodox Churches in Canada
- Coptic
- Copts in Canada
- Religion in Canada
- Coptic diaspora
- Coptic Orthodox Church in North America
  - Coptic Orthodox Church in the United States
    - List of Coptic Orthodox Churches in the United States
  - Coptic Orthodox Church in Mexico
- Oriental Orthodoxy in North America
