= Religion in North America =

Religion in North America (Pew Research Center 2020)
1. Christianity (62.9%)
2. Unaffiliated (30.2%)
3. Islam (1.60%)
4. Judaism (1.60%)
5. Buddhism (1.30%)
6. Hinduism (1.00%)
7. Other religions (1.40%)

Northamerica Christian as per Pew Research Center, 2023–24 Religious Landscape Study

North America County Denominations

Religion in North America is dominated by various branches of Christianity and spans the period of Native American dwelling, European settlement, and the present day. Religion has been a major influence on art, culture, philosophy and law of the continent.

Between them, the United States, Mexico and Canada account for 85 percent of the population of North America. Religion in each of these countries is dominated by Christianity (77.4), making it the largest religious group in North America.

== By religion ==
=== Christianity ===
- North America: 75.2%-77.4%
- Mexico: 87.7%
- United States: 73.7%
- Canada: 67.3%

=== Judaism ===
- North America: 1.5%
- United States: 1.7% to 2.9%
- Canada: 1.2%
- Mexico: 0.02%

=== Islam ===
- Canada: 4.9%
- United States: 1.2%
- Mexico: 0.2%

=== Buddhism ===
- Canada: 1.4%
- Mexico: 0.09%
- United States: 0.9%

=== Sikhism ===
- Canada: 2.1%
- United States: 0.2%

=== Bahá'í Faith ===
- United States: 0.2%
- Canada: 0.1%
- Mexico: <0.1%

== Irreligion ==
- Canada: 35%
- United States: 28%
- Mexico: 8%

== By country ==
Country	Population	Christian		Muslim		Irreligion		Hindu		Buddhist		Folk religion		Other religion		Jewish	
Country	Population	Pop.	%	Pop.	%	Pop.	%	Pop.	%	Pop.	%	Pop.	%	Pop.	%	Pop.	%
Anguilla	20,000	18,120	90.60	60	0.30	800	4.00	80	0.40	0	0.00	580	2.90	320	1.60	20	0.10
Antigua and Barbuda	90,000	83,700	93.00	540	0.60	1,530	1.70	180	0.20	0	0.00	3,240	3.60	900	1.00	0	0.00
Aruba	110,670	101,090	91.90	220	0.20	6,600	6.00	0	0.00	110	0.10	1,430	1.30	110	0.10	440	0.40
(The Bahamas) Bahamas	340,550	326,400	96.00	340	0.10	10,540	3.10	0	0.00	0	0.00	1,020	0.30	1,020	0.30	0	0.00
Barbados	270,000	257,040	95.20	2,700	1.00	5,130	1.90	1,080	0.40	0	0.00	0	0.00	3,780	1.40	0	0.00
Belize	310,000	271,560	87.60	310	0.10	27,590	8.90	620	0.20	1,550	0.50	4,650	1.50	310	0.10	3,100	1.00
Bermuda	60,000	45,000	75.00	660	1.10	11,640	19.40	0	0.00	300	0.50	1,800	3.00	480	0.80	180	0.30
Bonaire	22,573	18,960	86.0	N/A	N/A	2,710	12.0	N/A	N/A	N/A	N/A	N/A	N/A	900	4.0	N/A	N/A
Canada	40,297,761	21,372,106	53.3	1,964,790	4.9	12,577,475	34.6	922,248	2.3	402,977	1.0	80,690	0.2	1,082,639	2.7	360,879	0.9
Cayman Islands	60,000	50,100	83.50	240	0.40	5,640	9.40	540	0.90	0	0.00	2,700	4.50	360	0.60	480	0.80
Costa Rica	5,044,197	4,585,175	90.90	0	0.00	368,140	7.90	0	0.00	0	0.00	38,280	0.80	13,980	0.30	0	0.00
Cuba	10,985,974	6,503,697	59.20	0	0.00	2,589,800	23.00	22,520	0.20	0	0.00	1,959,240	17.40	0	0.00	0	0.00
Curaçao	155,000	134,230	86.6	N/A	N/A	15,500	10.0	N/A	N/A	N/A	N/A	N/A	N/A	6,820	4.4	N/A	N/A
Dominica	70,000	66,080	94.40	70	0.10	350	0.50	0	0.00	70	0.10	2,100	3.00	1,190	1.70	0	0.00
Dominican Republic	10,790,744	9,654,254	88.00	0	0.00	1,082,370	10.90	0	0.00	0	0.00	89,370	0.90	9,930	0.10	0	0.00
El Salvador	6,602,370	5,823,290	88.20	0	0.00	680,900	11.00	0	0.00	0	0.00	30,950	0.50	18,570	0.30	0	0.00
Greenland	60,000	57,660	96.10	0	0.00	1,500	2.50	0	0.00	0	0.00	480	0.80	360	0.60	0	0.00
Grenada	100,000	96,600	96.60	300	0.30	1,000	1.00	700	0.70	0	0.00	1,300	1.30	200	0.20	0	0.00
Guadeloupe	460,000	441,140	95.90	1,840	0.40	11,500	2.50	2,300	0.50	0	0.00	1,840	0.40	1,840	0.40	0	0.00
Guatemala	17,980,803	17,117,724	95.20	0	0.00	589,990	4.10	0	0.00	0	0.00	86,340	0.60	10,000	0.07	0	0.00
Haiti	11,470,261	9,967,656	86.90	0	0.00	1,058,940	10.60	0	0.00	0	0.00	219,780	2.20	29,970	0.30	0	0.00
Honduras	9,571,352	8,384,504	87.60	7,600	0.10	798,000	10.50	0	0.00	7,600	0.10	83,600	1.10	45,600	0.60	0	0.00
Jamaica	2,740,000	2,115,280	77.20	0	0.00	471,280	17.20	0	0.00	0	0.00	123,300	4.50	27,400	1.00	0	0.00
Martinique	410,000	395,650	96.50	820	0.20	9,430	2.30	820	0.20	0	0.00	820	0.20	2,460	0.60	0	0.00
Mexico	129,875,529	118,576,357	91.3	N/A	N/A	10,585,178	8.4	N/A	N/A	N/A	N/A	N/A	N/A	378,043	0.3	N/A	N/A
Montserrat	5,000	4,675	93.50	0	0.00	240	4.80	5	0.10	0	0.00	10	0.20	75	1.50	0	0.00
Nicaragua	6,359,689	5,456,613	85.80	0	0.00	723,750	12.50	0	0.00	0	0.00	81,060	1.40	5,790	0.10	0	0.00
Panama	3,520,000	3,273,600	93.00	24,640	0.70	168,960	4.80	0	0.00	7,040	0.20	14,080	0.40	14,080	0.40	14,080	0.40
Puerto Rico	3,285,870	2,924,400	89.00	0	0.00	262,870	8.00	0	0.00	0	0.00	0	0.00	98,580	3.00	0	0.00
(Saba (island)) Saba	1,911	1452	76.0	115	6.0	344	18.0	N/A	N/A	N/A	N/A	N/A	N/A	N/A	N/A	N/A	N/A
Saint Kitts and Nevis	50,000	47,300	94.60	150	0.30	800	1.60	750	1.50	0	0.00	650	1.30	400	0.80	0	0.00
Saint Lucia	170,000	154,870	91.10	170	0.10	10,200	6.00	510	0.30	0	0.00	850	0.50	3,400	2.00	0	0.00
Saint Pierre and Miquelon	6,000	5,682	94.70	12	0.20	228	3.80	0	0.00	0	0.00	0	0.00	78	1.30	0	0.00
Saint Vincent and the Grenadines	110,000	97,570	88.70	1,650	1.50	2,750	2.50	3,740	3.40	0	0.00	2,200	2.00	2,200	2.00	0	0.00
Sint Eustatius	3,240	2,757	85.1	N/A	N/A	483	14.9	N/A	N/A	N/A	N/A	N/A	N/A	N/A	N/A	N/A	N/A
Sint Maarten	41,486	34,060	82.1	N/A	N/A	3,277	7.9	2,160	5.2	N/A	N/A	N/A	N/A	1,990	4.8	N/A	N/A
Trinidad and Tobago	1,340,000	883,060	65.90	79,060	5.90	25,460	1.90	304,180	22.70	4,020	0.30	25,460	1.90	18,760	1.40	0	0.00
Turks and Caicos Islands	40,000	36,840	92.10	0	0.00	1,840	4.60	0	0.00	0	0.00	1,080	2.70	240	0.60	0	0.00
British Virgin Islands	20,000	16,900	84.50	240	1.20	780	3.90	240	1.20	0	0.00	1,680	8.40	160	0.80	0	0.00
United States	339,996,564	262,817,343	77.30	3,059,969	0.90	55,759,436	16.40	2,039,979	0.60	4,079,958	1.20	679,993	0.20	2,039,979	0.60	6,119,938	1.80
(United States Virgin Islands) U.S. Virgin Islands	87,150	82,620	94.80	90	0.10	3,225	3.70	0	0.00	0	0.00	0	0.00	660	0.60	330	0.30

== See also ==
- Roman Catholicism in North America
- Eastern Orthodoxy in North America
- Oriental Orthodoxy in North America
- Religion in South America

== Sources ==
- FitzGerald, Thomas (2007). "Eastern Christianity in the United States". The Blackwell Companion to Eastern Christianity. Malden, MA: Blackwell Publishing. pp. 269–279.
