= Coptic Canadians =

Total population
- 22,570 (by religion, 2021 census); 35,000 (estimated by Canadian Coptic Association)

Regions with significant populations
- Ontario: Mississauga, Toronto (North York, Scarborough, Etobicoke), Hamilton, Kitchener; Quebec: Montreal, Laval, Quebec City; etc.
- Ontario: 14,845
- Quebec: 4,750

Languages
- Canadian English · Canadian French; Mainly older people: Arabic (Egyptian Arabic, Sudanese Arabic, Libyan Arabic); Liturgical: Coptic language.

Religion
- Coptic Orthodoxy, Coptic Catholicism, Coptic Evangelical

Copts in Canada are Canadian citizens of Coptic descent or people of Coptic descent residing in Canada.

== Population and distribution ==
According to the 2011 census, there were 3,570 Canadians who reported Coptic ancestry (this figure combines single and multiple ethnic origin responses). Of this number, 755 Canadians reported Coptic as their only ancestry, whereas 2,810 reported Coptic as one of multiple ancestries.

In the same survey, around 17,000 Canadians said they belonged to the Coptic Orthodox Church. Of this number, 12,645 were immigrants and 3,365 were born in Canada.

The Canadian Coptic Association estimates that there are 35,000 Copts living in Canada; according to CBC News, "if other sects with strong ties to the Coptic community are included, the figure is possibly higher still." (Note: There is likely a typo in the CBC article where an extra zero was added, thereby erroneous stating that there are 350,000 Copts in Canada).

Toronto and the surrounding metropolitan region have the largest concentration of Copts in Canada.

== Immigration history ==
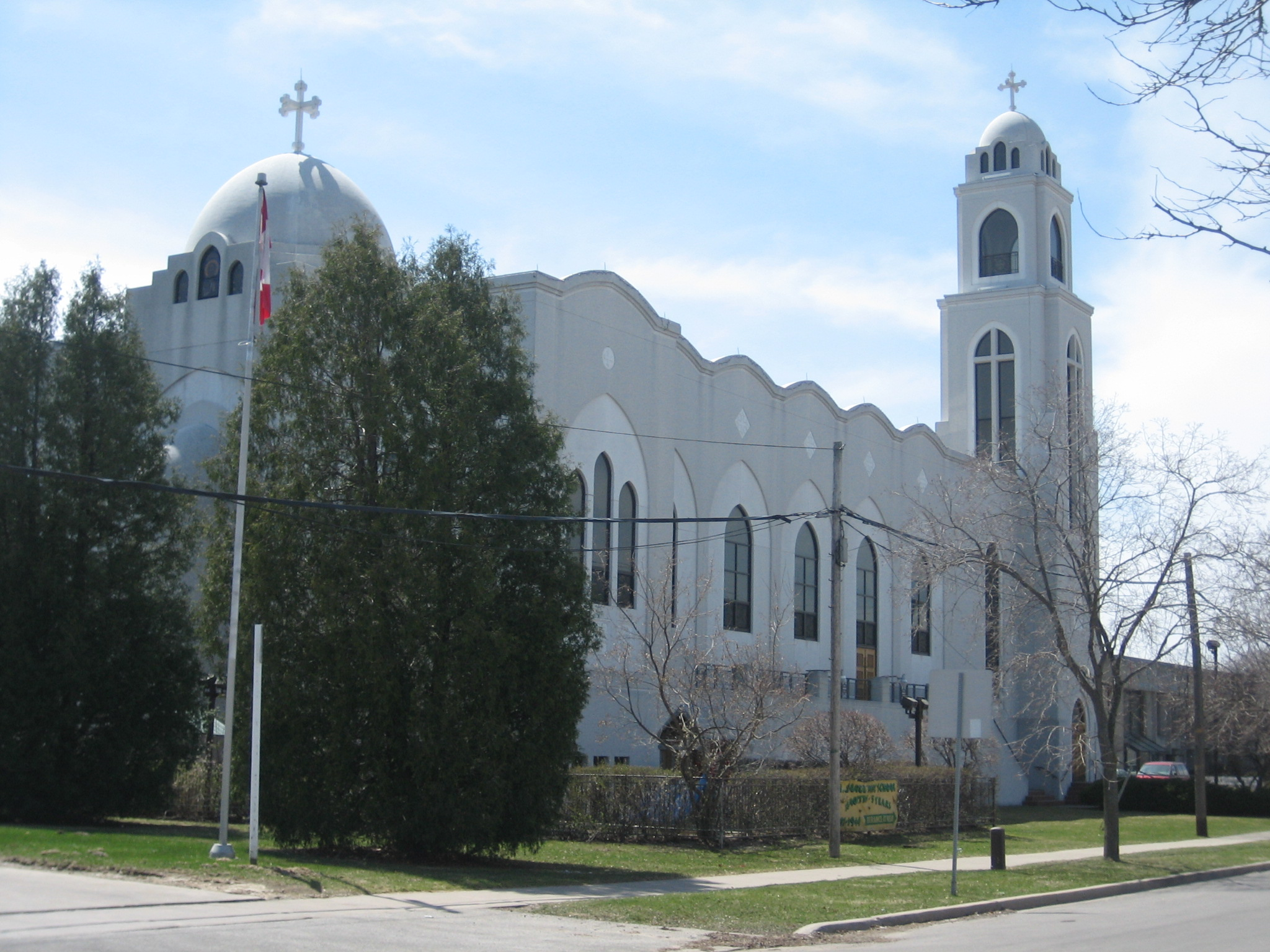
St. George & St. Rueiss Coptic Orthodox Church in Toronto, Ontario.

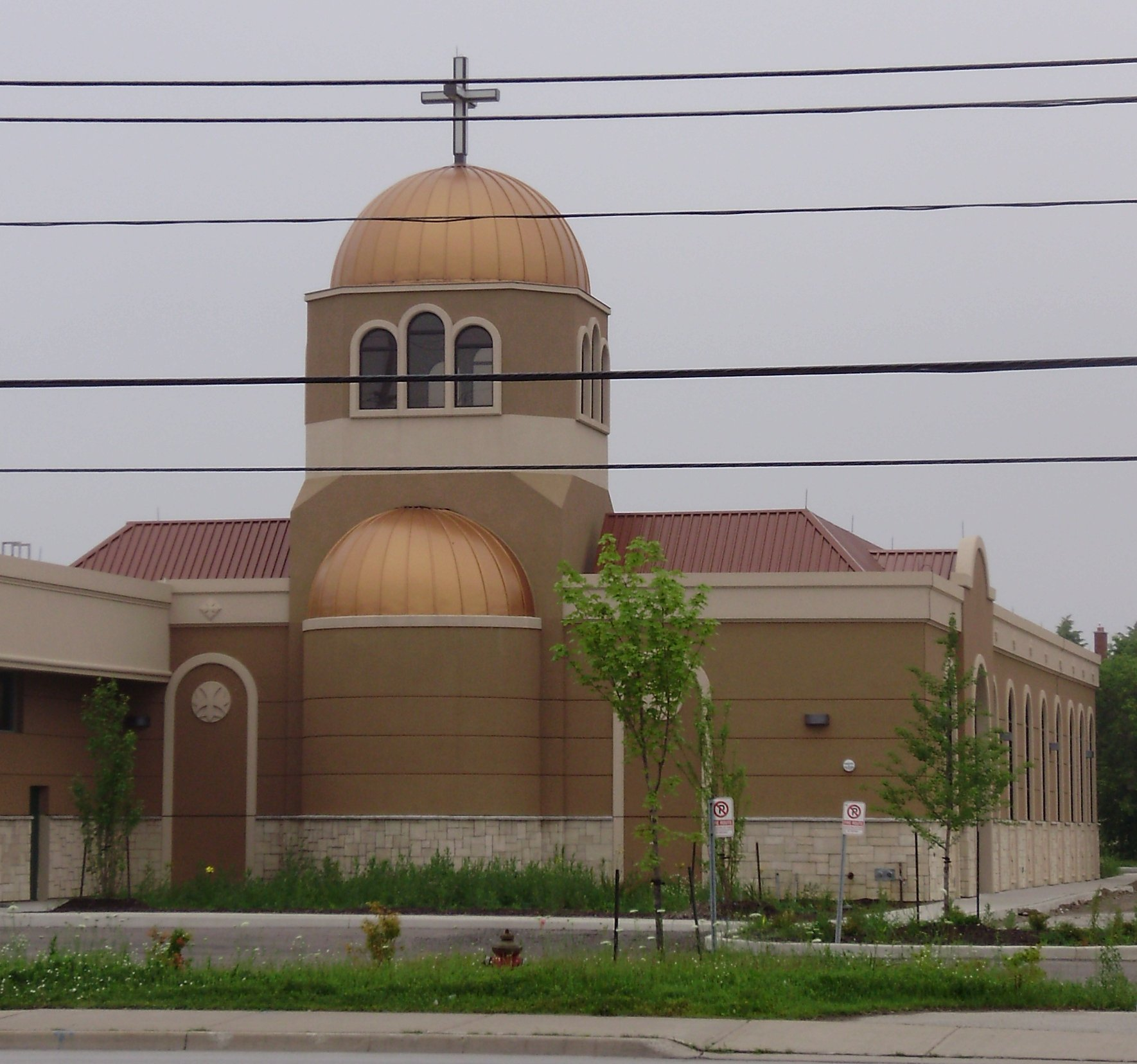
St. Mina and St. Kyrillos Coptic Orthodox Church in Mississauga, Ontario.

The immigration of the Copts to Canada might have started as early as the late 1950s with most immigrants arriving in throughout the 1970s, from Egypt to Canada being mostly Christians who mostly left due to poverty in their home country and job opportunities.

== Coptic Orthodox Church in Canada ==
In 1964, St. Mark Coptic Orthodox Church was established in Toronto; this was the first Coptic church established in the Coptic diaspora.

In 2002, a survey showed 22 Coptic Orthodox parishes in Canada, indicating growth.

In 2011, there were five Coptic Orthodox churches in Montreal.

== Notable Coptic Canadians ==
- Manuel Tadros – singer, songwriter, actor, comedian and voice actor
- Xavier Dolan – filmmaker
- Mena Massoud – actor
- Yousry Bissada - Former CEO of Home Capital Group Inc.

== See also ==
- Middle Eastern Canadians
- List of Coptic Orthodox churches in Canada
- Copts
- Coptic diaspora
- Coptic Americans
- Coptic Australians
- Copts in Egypt
- Copts in Sudan
- Copts in Libya
