= Protestantism in Egypt =

There are around 500,000 to 1,000,000 Protestants in Egypt, with 300,000 to 600,000 being members of the Evangelical Church of Egypt, Pentecostals number 300,000 to 350,000, and various other Protestants scattered in smaller denominations.

Protestants first arrived in Egypt in the 1600s when Moravian missionaries from Germany travelled to the country to work with Eastern Orthodox churches. In 1818 the English Church Mission Society sent Rev William Jowett to Egypt to work with the Coptic church and convert local Copts from Orthodox to Protestantism. St Mark’s Anglican Church in Alexandria was opened in 1839. Presbyterian missionaries from the US arrived in 1854 and eventually established the Coptic Evangelical Church. Both sets of missionaries established schools for local children and trained local preachers.

The Evangelical Presbyterian Seminary in Cairo is more than 140 years old and is the oldest Protestant Seminary in Egypt.

In 2021, approximately 9% of Egyptians were Coptic Orthodox and 1% of people were either Catholic or Protestant. Most Protestant denominations belong to the General Evangelical Council.

The government recognises Christianity and allows Christians to worship publicly. However, although Jehovah’s Witnesses are recognised as Christians, they are not allowed to worship. There have been reports of tensions in the area of planning permission for new church buildings.

== List of Protestant denominations ==
- Assemblies of God
- Egyptian Baptist Convention
- Christian Brethren
- Church of God of Prophecy
- Episcopal/Anglican Province of Alexandria
- Evangelical Church of Egypt (Synod of the Nile)
- Free Methodist (120 churches)
- Pentecostal Church of God
- Pentecostal Holiness Church
- Seventh-day Adventist Church

== Sources ==
- Religion in Egypt
- Adherents, archived from the original on 2018-05-19.
- Department of State, US.
- Egypt, GMI, archived from the original on 2008-11-18.

== See also ==
- Religion in Egypt
- Christianity in Egypt
- Coptic Orthodox Church
- Catholic Church in Egypt
- General Evangelical Council/ Evangelical Fellowship of Egypt
