= Coptic Orthodox Church in South America =

The Coptic Orthodox Church in South America has bishops in Bolivia and Brazil.

== History of the Church in Bolivia ==
In 1997, Fr. Aghathon Amba Boula heard of and began to visit a few Copts who were living in Bolivia. He continued to serve them for four years until they requested a permanent priest. Fr. Youssef Amba Boula was sent to serve them. Youssef had minor courses in Spanish prior to coming to Bolivia. He arrived on December 14, 2000. Youssef started services in a rented flat located in a poor area. However, only one Copt remained in Bolivia. The other families returned to Egypt or immigrated to the U.S.A. He prayed his first Liturgy in the hall of his flat three days after his arrival. At this time, there were no liturgical books in Spanish, but within six months he had made a translation. He continued to pray in the hall for two years.

Youssef began teaching Coptic Hymns to children and youth in Coptic and Spanish. He arranged trips. He started to communicate regularly with many Bolivians. Frequently they asked him about his clothing, his beard and the cross he wears. When they knew that he was a Christian, they started to ask him about his beliefs and the Coptic Orthodox Church. He explained Orthodoxy and showed them the love of Christ. Youssef loved them and they loved him back. He spent time with them, listened to their problems, aided them to solutions and gave them spiritual advice. He started various spiritual and social services. They learned about the Coptic Church, embraced it and were baptised. Youssef performed the sacraments of baptism, confirmation, marriage and unction of the sick multiple times. He wrote a book about the Coptic Church in Spanish and published the Coptic Spanish Liturgy Book. With the guidance of Pope Shenouda III, the help of Fr. Michael Edward, priest of St. Mark Church in Cleveland, and the determination of Youssef, the service continued to grow.

=== Santa Maria y San Marcos Church ===
By 2002, the Church was growing rapidly in numbers and services. Youssef looked for land to build a Church. He found a place with a large hall and playground suitable for that purpose and purchased it. The media recognized the rapid growth of the church and invited Youssef for interviews in newspaper and on TV. Activities continuously increased for the congregation. These included teaching, cooking and crafts. In 2003, he brought more land and built an activity hall to be used for the various service.

==== Building the Church ====
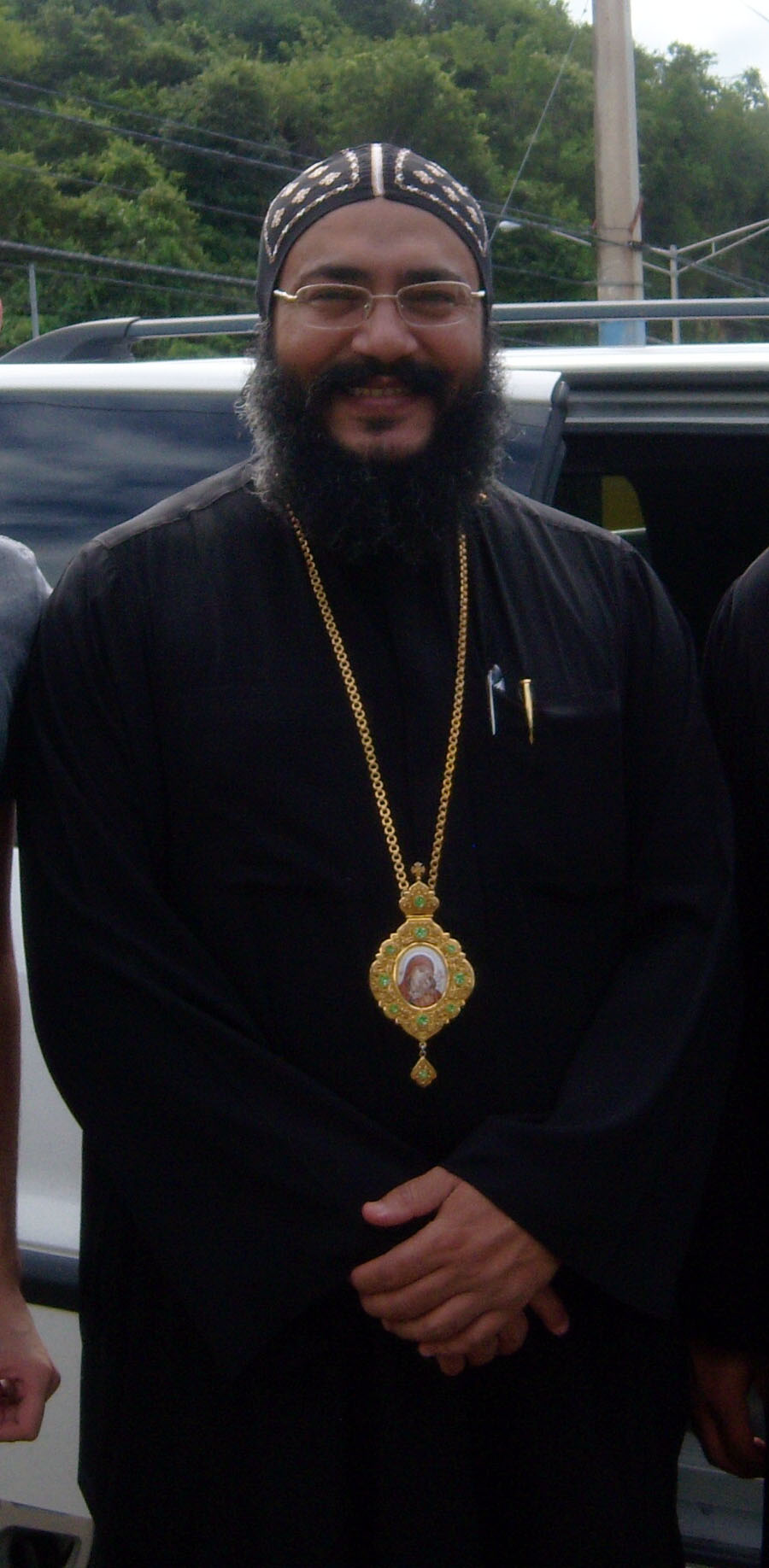
Bishop Youssef of Bolivia

In 2004, Youssef began construction of the new church as it currently stands today. Within nine months, the structure of the building was complete. Soon afterwards, Egyptian artist Tasony Sawsan Salib flew from Egypt to Bolivia to draw the Icons of the church. The Iconostasis was designed in traditional Coptic style by Bolivians.

On February 13, 2006, Pope Shenouda III, accompanied by bishops and priests, visited Bolivia to consecrate Santa Maria y San Marcos Church. They were greeted with a warm welcome from the Bolivians. The event was live on the radio, televised within Bolivia, and documented in the local newspapers. The consecration was attended by many dignitaries including ecclesiastical and political members.

On June 11, 2006, Shenouda ordained Youssef as Bishop of Bolivia. The following year in June, Bishop Youssef brought Fr. Hedra Anba Boula to service with him in Bolivia. Later, Brother Milad joined them and was ordained by the bishop on November 15, 2009, as Father Anthony. Riad Ibrahim joined the service as a deacon in 2010.

=== The Church of Bolivia in the twenty-first century ===
As of 2012, the congregation had approximately 450 Bolivians attending Church services regularly. The Coptic Church is well known among Bolivians and in the media. The newspapers speak highly about the Church and its activities.

The Church has a small bakery and carpentry workshop that serves the community. Recently the bishop opened Pope Shenouda III Medical Centre. The Church added a library and a computer centre for the youth, to help them in their studies. The next step is to open an orphanage and a day care to help the street children.

On Sunday 12 February 2006, Shenouda consecrated Saint Mark Coptic Orthodox church in São Paulo, Brazil. On the following day the Pope consecrated Saint Mary and Saint Mark Coptic Orthodox church in Santa Cruz, Bolivia.

== Bishops ==
There are many Coptic Orthodox churches and congregations in South America, currently the church has two Bishops both ordinated in 2006 serving in South America

1. Aghathon, Bishop of the Holy Diocese of São Paulo and All Brazil, who is mainly serving Portuguese-speaking territories.
2. Youssef (Joseph), Bishop of the Holy Diocese of Santa Cruz and All Bolivia.

== See also ==
- Coptic Orthodox Church in Canada
- Coptic Orthodox Church in Europe
- Coptic Orthodox Church in the United States
- Patriarch of Alexandria
- Oriental Orthodoxy
- Coptic diaspora
