= Oriental Orthodoxy in North America =

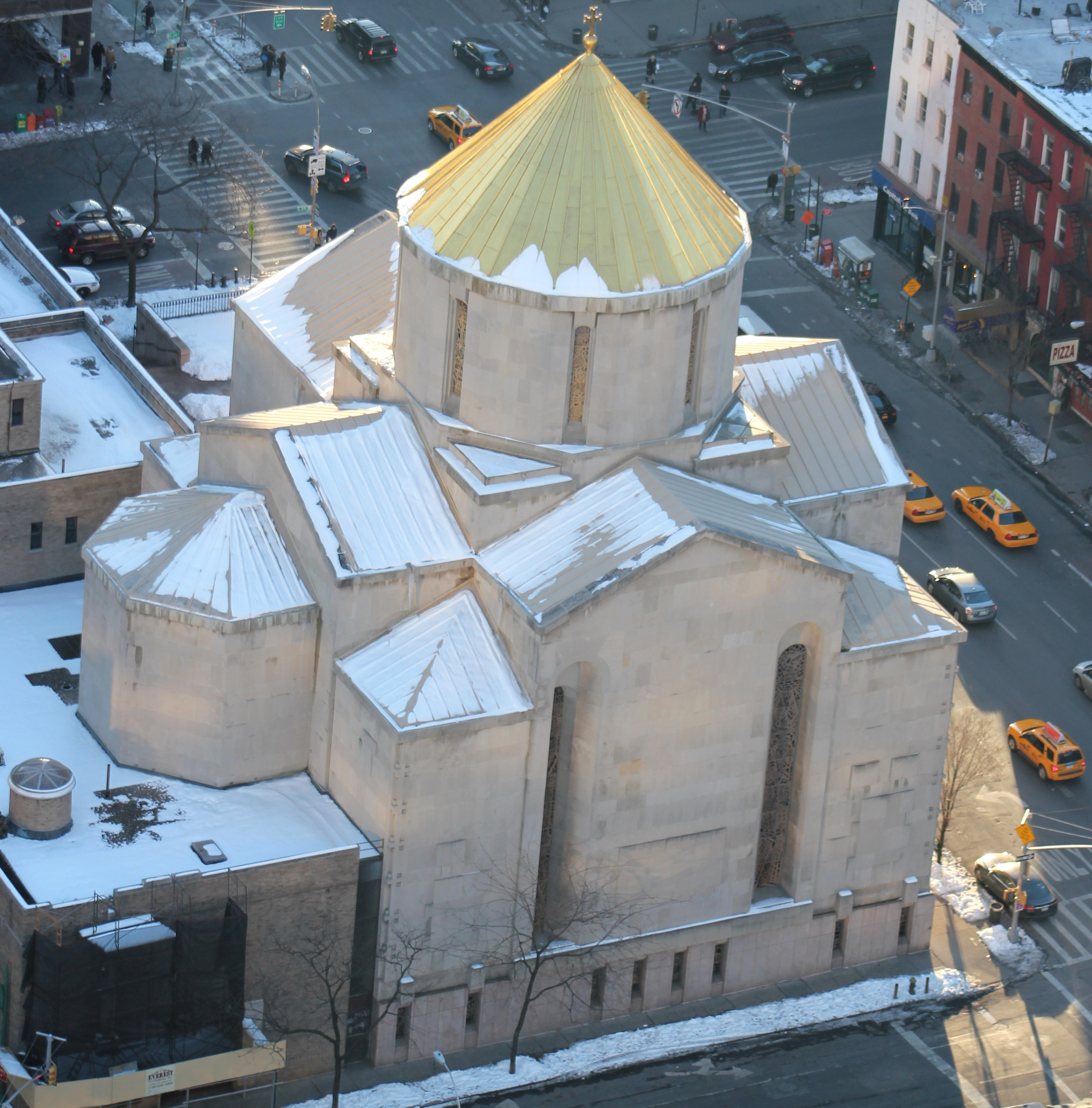
St. Vartan Armenian Cathedral in New York City

Oriental Orthodoxy in North America represents adherents, religious communities, institutions and organizations of Oriental Orthodox Christianity in North America, including the United States, Canada, Mexico and other North American states. Oriental Orthodox Christians in North America are traditionally organized in accordance with their patrimonial ecclesiastical jurisdictions, with each community having its own structure of dioceses and parishes. Oriental Orthodox jurisdictions are organized within the Standing Conference of Oriental Orthodox Churches.

== Presence By Region ==
=== Northern America ===
==== Canada ====
Oriental Orthodoxy was brought to Canada by Armenian and Syrian immigrants. The Armenian Apostolic Church established the first Oriental Orthodox church in Canada. Today, all 6 branches are established in the country with over 150 parishes serving 65,310 people.

=== Caribbean ===
==== Bermuda ====
Ethiopian Orthodoxy brought Oriental Orthodoxy to Bermuda in 1974 when it established the Debre Ganet Emmanuel Ethiopian Orthodox Tewahedo Church. Today there is a Coptic Orthodox parish and an Ethiopian Orthodox parish serving the island.

==== Dominican Republic ====
The Dominican Republic contains one Oriental Orthodox Church. Saint Mary and Saint Mark Coptic Orthodox Church in Puerto Plata.

==== Jamaica ====
Oriental Orthodoxy entered Jamaica when Emperor Haile Selassie I sent Archimandrite Abba Laike Mariam Mandefro to establish the Ethiopian Orthodox Church in Jamaica. Today there are 4 parishes, and it is the only Oriental Orthodox branch in Jamaica.

==== Martinique ====
There is one Oriental Orthodox Church in Martinique under the Ethiopian Orthodox Church.

=== Mexico and Latin America ===
==== Guatemala ====
Between 2012 and 2013, 500,000 Guatemalans were baptized into the Syriac Orthodox Church. It is the only Oriental Orthodox branch located in Guatemala.

== Jurisdictions ==
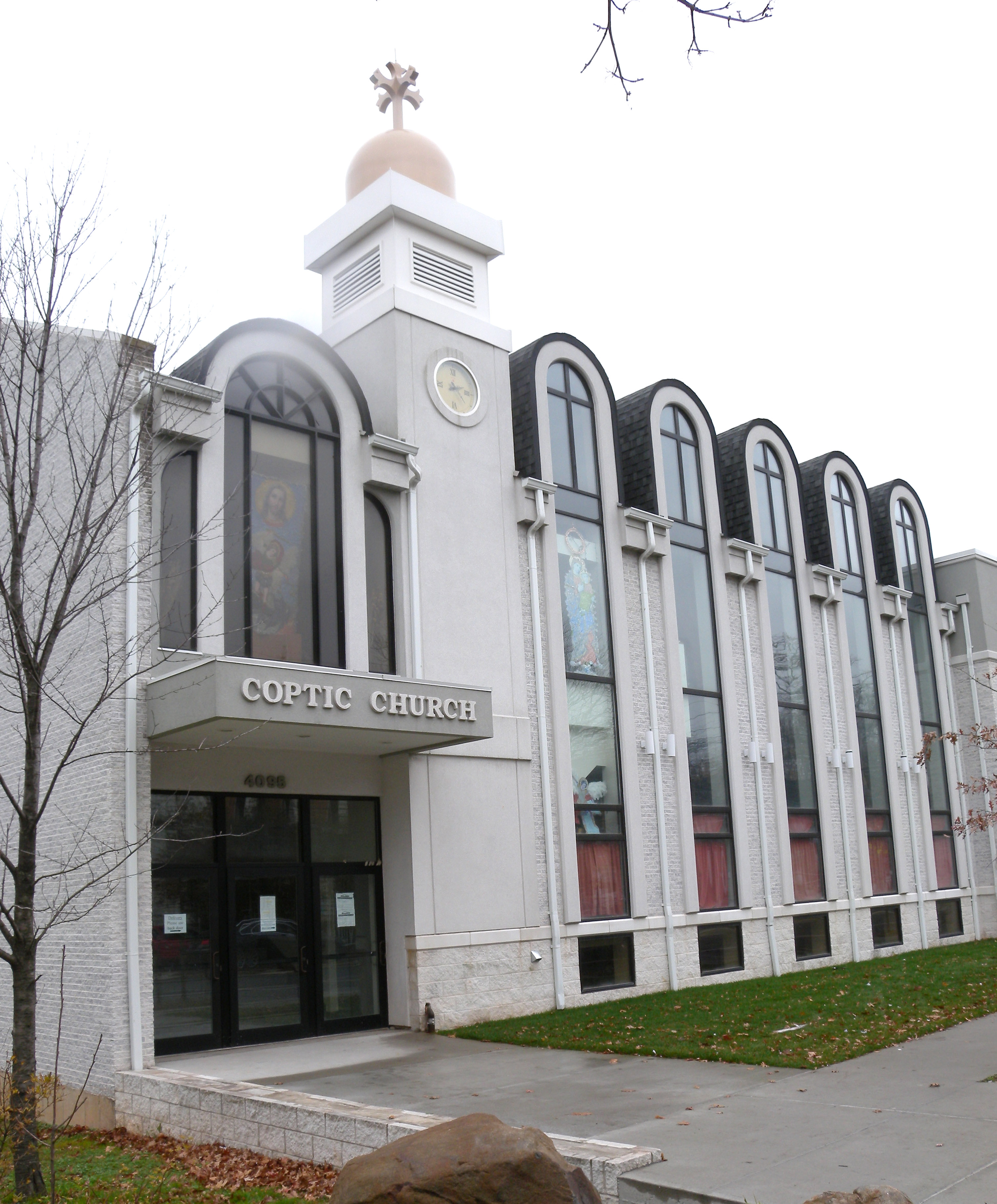
Coptic Orthodox Church of Archangel Michael and St. Mena in Staten Island

Historically, Oriental Orthodoxy was introduced to North America during the 19th century, mainly through emigration of Christians from the Middle East, Caucasus, North Africa and India. Honoring such diverse heritage, Oriental Orthodoxy in North America is traditionally organized in accordance with patrimonial jurisdictions of Oriental Orthodox Churches, each of them having its own hierarchy with dioceses and parishes.

- Coptic Orthodox Church: Patriarchate of Alexandria
  - Coptic Orthodox Archdiocese of New Jersey and North America
  - Coptic Orthodox Archdiocese of Northern California and Western United States of America
  - Coptic Orthodox Archdiocese of Toronto and Middle Canada
  - Coptic Orthodox Diocese of Los Angeles, Southern California, and Hawaii
  - Coptic Orthodox Diocese of the Southern United States
  - Coptic Orthodox Diocese of New York and New England
  - Coptic Orthodox Diocese of Pennsylvania, Delaware, Maryland and West Virginia
  - Coptic Orthodox Diocese of North Carolina, South Carolina, and Kentucky
  - Coptic Orthodox Diocese of Ohio, Michigan, and Indiana
  - Coptic Orthodox Diocese of Mississauga, Vancouver and Western Canada
  - Coptic Orthodox Diocese of Ottawa, Montréal and Eastern Canada
- Syriac Orthodox Church: Patriarchate of Antioch and All the East
  - Syriac Orthodox Archdiocese of the Eastern United States
  - Syriac Orthodox Archdiocese of the Western United States
  - Syriac Orthodox Archdiocese of Canada
  - Syriac Orthodox Archdiocese of Central America, the Caribbean Islands and Venezuela
    - Diocese of Northern Guatemala
    - Diocese of Western Guatemala
    - Diocese of Central Guatemala
  - Malankara Archdiocese of North America
  - North America and Europe Region of the Knanaya Archdiocese
- Armenian Apostolic Church: Mother See of Holy Etchmiadzin
  - Eastern Diocese of the Armenian Church of North America
  - Western Diocese of the Armenian Church of North America
  - Diocese of the Armenian Church of Canada
- Armenian Apostolic Church: Catholicosate of the Great House of Cilicia
  - Eastern Prelacy of the Armenian Church of North America
  - Western Prelacy of the Armenian Church of North America
  - Armenian Prelacy of Canada
- Ethiopian Orthodox Tewahedo Church
  - Ethiopian Orthodox Archdiocese of Washington D.C., Virginia, Maryland and Delaware
  - Ethiopian Orthodox Archdiocese of Minnesota, South Dakota, North Dakota, Iowa and Wisconsin
  - Ethiopian Orthodox Archdiocese of Georgia, Florida, North Carolina, South Carolina, Tennessee and Alabama
  - Ethiopian Orthodox Archdiocese of Texas, Oklahoma, Louisiana, Arkansas, New Mexico and Hawaii
  - Ethiopian Orthodox Archdiocese of Ohio, Michigan, Indiana, Missouri, Kentucky and Illinois
  - Ethiopian Orthodox Archdiocese of Northern California, Nevada and Arizona
  - Ethiopian Orthodox Archdiocese of Southern California and Alaska
  - Ethiopian Orthodox Archdiocese of Washington, Oregon, Wyoming and Idaho
  - Ethiopian Orthodox Archdiocese of Colorado, Utah, Kansas and Nebraska
  - Ethiopian Orthodox Archdiocese of New York, New Jersey, Massachusetts, Vermont, Maine and Connecticut
  - Ethiopian Orthodox Diocese of Eastern Canada
  - Ethiopian Orthodox Diocese of Western Canada
- Eritrean Orthodox Tewahedo Church
  - Eritrean Orthodox Diocese of United States of America and Canada
  - Eritrean Orthodox Diocese of North America (Synod in-Exile)
- Malankara Orthodox Syrian Church: Catholicate of the East and Malankara Metropolitanate
  - Malankara Orthodox Diocese of Northeast America
  - Malankara Orthodox Diocese of Southwest America
  - Malankara Orthodox Diocese of Canada

== See also ==
- Oriental Orthodoxy
- History of Oriental Orthodoxy
- Oriental Orthodoxy in Guatemala
- Coptic Orthodox Church in the United States
- Coptic Orthodox Church in Canada
- Coptic Orthodox Church in Mexico
- Miaphysitism
- Christianity in North America
- Eastern Orthodoxy in North America
- Eastern Christianity

== Sources ==
- FitzGerald, Thomas (2007). "Eastern Christianity in the United States". The Blackwell Companion to Eastern Christianity. Malden, MA: Blackwell Publishing. pp. 269–279. ISBN 9780470766392.
- Krikorian, Mesrob K. (2010). Christology of the Oriental Orthodox Churches: Christology in the Tradition of the Armenian Apostolic Church. Peter Lang. ISBN 9783631581216.
