= Coptic =

Coptic may refer to:

== Afro-Asia ==
- Copts, an ethnoreligious group mainly in the area of modern Egypt but also in Sudan and Libya
- Coptic language, a Northern Afro-Asiatic language spoken in Egypt until at least the 17th century
- Coptic script, the script used for writing the Coptic language, encoded in Unicode as:
  - Greek and Coptic (Unicode block), a block of Unicode characters for writing the Coptic language, from which Coptic was disunified in Unicode 4.1
  - Coptic (Unicode block), a block of Unicode characters for writing the Coptic language, introduced in Unicode 4.1
  - Coptic Epact Numbers, a block of Unicode characters for writing Coptic numerals
- Coptic Orthodox Church of Alexandria or Coptic Church, the largest Christian church in Egypt and the Middle East
- Coptic Catholic Church, an Alexandrian Rite particular Church
- Coptic architecture, the architecture of the Copts
- Coptic binding or Coptic sewing, methods of bookbinding employed by early Christians in Egypt

== Other uses ==
- SS Coptic (1881), a ship of the White Star Line
- Coptic Egypt: The Christians of the Nile, a 2000 nonfiction book written by Christian Cannuyer
- Coptic Encyclopedia, an eight-volume work covering all areas of knowledge of Coptic Egypt

== See also ==
- Copic, a brand of refillable markers
