= Coptic Orthodox Church in the United States =

Copts, many of whom are adherents of the Coptic Orthodox Church, began migrating to the United States of America in the late 1940s. After 1952, the rate of Coptic immigration from Egypt to the United States increased. The first Coptic church in the United States, St. Mark's Coptic Orthodox Church, was established in the late 1960s in Jersey City.

There are many Coptic Orthodox churches and congregations in the United States. Estimated numbers of adherents, based on church membership, was stated in 2008 as between 350,000 and 420,000. Based on the estimates of certain Coptic organizations, the number was between 700,000 and one million in 2002. As of 2007, there were about 200 parishes in the United States that served the expanding Coptic Orthodox population.

== History ==
=== Early community ===
The first Copts arrived in the United States during the early 20th century. Due to the restrictions on immigration put in place by the National Origins Formula, the majority of these early Coptic migrants to the USA were non-permanent residents. The Copts who traveled to the United States at this time were mostly foreign exchange students who were continuing their graduate education within the United States, and then returning home to Egypt. After the 1952 Coup d'État in Egypt, the Egyptian Economy began to stagnate, and more and more young Egyptians began seeking opportunities to study and work abroad. In 1964, as the number of Copts grew in the United States, the first Coptic lay organization in the United States, the Coptic American Association (CAA) was founded. The organization managed to amass 200 members, from throughout the States, by the end of 1964.

=== Immigration reform ===
In 1965, the United States Congress passed a new Immigration Act that put an end to the National Origins Formula, and allowed for greater numbers of Immigrants from non-European countries. This new act, which was fully implemented in 1968, coupled with Egypt's humiliating defeat in the Six Days War, paved the way for many young educated Copts, disillusioned with Egypt's state of affairs, to immigrate. These early immigrants moved to the United States in search of religious freedom, political stability, and economic opportunity. The majority of these new immigrants settled either on the East Coast in the New York and New Jersey metropolitan area, or on the California West Coast, near Los Angeles and San Diego.

As the number of Copts in America continued to grow, the CAA and other Coptic groups in the US began lines of dialogue with Pope Cyril VI and Bishop Samuel, the Bishop of Public, Social, and Ecumenical Services, to establish churches in the US and Canada. In response to these requests, a series of visiting priests began to visit and serve the congregation in North America. The community was not content, however, with being visited a few times a year, they wished to have their own local Church congregations. The efforts to establish permanent churches in United States were re-doubled, and Pope Cyril VI and Bishop Samuel, supported the congregations in this endeavor by sending more priests to serve the communities on a more permanent basis.

=== Establishing churches ===
Early in 1970, the Coptic community in the East Coast, purchased and renovated a Church building in Jersey City. This building was registered and incorporated as Saint Mark Coptic Orthodox Church, Jersey City; the first Coptic Church in the United States. On March 22, 1970, the Church's inaugural Liturgy was prayed by Fr. Rofael Nakhla.

Meanwhile, the Coptic community in the West Coast had also been working on purchasing their first Church. In 1969, Pope Cyril VI commissioned Fr. Bishoy Kamel to go serve the community in Los Angeles. In addition to his spiritual service to the community, Fr. Bishoy Kamel led a fund raising campaign in order to purchase a church building. In 1970, the congregation succeeded in purchasing a building and incorporating it as Saint Mark Coptic Orthodox Church, Los Angeles, the first Coptic Church on the West Coast.

By 1976, there were ten Coptic Churches in the United States, two in New Jersey, two in California, two in New York, one in Pennsylvania, one in Texas, one in Ohio, and one in Illinois; all being parishes of the Archdiocese of North America, headed directly by the Patriarch of Alexandria.

The growing number of parishes in the United States garnered the attention of the then newly elected Pope Shenouda III. In May 1977, Pope Shenouda III, made a historic two-month visit to the United States in order to personally serve the Coptic community there. Although Pope Shenouda III had planned another visit to the United States shortly after this first visit, he was detained by the events in Egypt, and was unable to visit the United States again until 1989. From that point forward Pope Shenouda III began making annual visits to the United States. He was accompanied on these visits by Metropolitan Serapion, who at that time, was serving as the Bishop of Public, Social, and Ecumenical Services. In 1992, Pope Shenouda III consecrated Metropolitan Youssef as a general bishop to oversee the churches in the Southern United States.

It was also during this period that the first Coptic Monastery in the United States was established, the Monastery of Saint Antony the Great, in Newberry Springs, California. In 1972, a piece of land had been purchased for this purpose, but it laid vacant until Pope Shenouda III, sent four monks to establish the monastery in 1989. In 1993, the monastery had grown sufficiently, and was recognized by the Holy Synod as the first Coptic Monastery in the United States. That same year, one of the establishing monks of the monastery was consecrated as Bishop Karas, and appointed as the Bishop and Abbot of the Monastery.

=== Establishing local dioceses ===
In 1995, following his annual visit to the United States, Pope Shenouda III, saw a need to establish dioceses in some of the most populated regions of the Archdiocese, in order to better effectively serve the community. He thus called Metropolitan Serapion to be Bishop of Los Angeles, Southern California, and Hawaii, and Metropolitan Youssef to be Bishop of the Southern United States, establishing the first two dioceses in the United States. In 1997, after seeing a need for a dedicated Bishop for the service of the Archdiocese of North America, Pope Shenouda III consecrated Bishop Suriel as a general bishop, to serve as Papal Exarch at the Archdiocese of North America. After Bishop Suriel was enthroned as bishop of Melbourne, Australia in 1999, Bishop David was consecrated as a general Bishop to continue the service of the Archdiocese. In 2009, Pope Shenouda III also consecrated Bishop Michael as a general bishop, to serve within the Virginia parishes of the Archdiocese of North America.

Upon his election to the Papacy, Pope Tawadros II continued Pope Shenouda III's efforts in expanding ministry within the United States. In 2013, he called Bishop David to be Bishop of New York and New England, establishing a third diocese in the United States. In 2016, he consecrated Bishop Peter to be Bishop of South Carolina, North Carolina, and Kentucky. In that same year he also consecrated Bishop Abraham and Bishop Kyrillos to serve as auxiliary bishops in the Dioceses of Los Angeles, Southern California, and Hawaii. In 2017, he consecrated two new diocesan bishops for the United States, Bishop Siraphem as Bishop of Ohio, Michigan, and Indiana, and Bishop Karas as Bishop of Pennsylvania, Delaware, Maryland, West Virginia and all affiliated regions. In 2018, he also consecrated Bishop Basil and Bishop Gregory to serve as auxiliary bishops in the Diocese of the Southern United States. In 2022, Pope Tawadros II also consecrated Bishop Gabriel as a general Bishop in New Jersey and Papal Exarch for the Archdiocese of North America in the United States.

== Episcopacy ==
=== Diocesan bishops ===
- Serapion (b. 1951), Metropolitan of the Holy Diocese of Los Angeles, Southern California and Hawaii and Abbot of the Monastery of St. Anthony in California (1985; 1995–present).
- Youssef, Metropolitan of the Holy Diocese of the Southern United States and Abbot of the Monastery of Most Holy Virgin Mary & Saint Moses the Strong in Corpus Christi, Texas. (1992; 1995–present)
- David, Bishop of the Holy Diocese of New York and New England. (1999; 2013–present)
- Karas, Bishop of the Holy Diocese of Pennsylvania and Affiliated Regions (2016–present)
- Peter, Bishop of the Holy Diocese of South Carolina, North Carolina, and Kentucky (2017–present)
- Saraphim, Bishop of the Holy Diocese of Ohio, Michigan and Indiana (2017–present)

=== General bishops ===
- Macarius, General Bishop and Patriarchal Exarch for the Eritrean Congregation in the USA. Member of the Eritrean and Coptic Holy Synods. (1991–present)
- Suriel, Bishop of the Diocese of Melbourne, currently serving as professor of Ecclesiastical Education at the Theological College in New Jersey. (1997; 2023–present)
- Michael, General Bishop in Virginia, United States, assistant to the Pope (2009–present)
- Gabriel, General Bishop in New Jersey and Patriarchal Exarch for the Archdiocese of North America, assistant to the Pope. (2022–present)

=== Auxiliary bishops ===
- Abraham, Auxiliary Bishop and assistant to Metropolitan Serapion in the Holy Diocese of Los Angeles, Southern California, and Hawaii. (2016–present)
- Kyrillos, Auxiliary Bishop and assistant to Metropolitan Serapion in the Holy Diocese of Los Angeles, Southern California, and Hawaii. (2016–present)
- Basil, Auxiliary Bishop in Florida and assistant to Metropolitan Youssef in the Holy Diocese of the Southern United States. (2018–present)
- Gregory, Auxiliary Bishop in Texas and assistant to Metropolitan Youssef in the Holy Diocese of the Southern United States. (2018–present)

=== Deceased hierarchs ===
- Karas, Bishop Abbot of the Monastery of Saint Antony the Great, in Newberry Springs, California. (1993 - 2002)

== Dioceses ==
The Coptic Orthodox Church of Alexandria has Churches and congregations in the following regions within the United States:

Map of the Dioceses of the Coptic Orthodox Church in the USA.

=== Archdiocese of North America ===
Before the establishment of any dioceses in the US and Canada, all churches were part of the Archdiocese of North America under the direct care of the Patriarchate of Alexandria, led by the Pope of Alexandria, with the headquarters at Cedar Grove, New Jersey. Throughout the years, the archdiocese was served by papal exarchs or vicars, representing the Pope, some of which were:

- Bishop Suriel as General Bishop for New Jersey.
- Bishop David as General Bishop for New Jersey and an enthroned bishop for New York and New England.
- Heg. Fr. Saraphim El-Souriani as a monk-hegumen who was then ordained and enthroned to be the Bishop of the Diocese of Ohio, Michigan, and Indiana
- Bishop Karas as a General Bishop who was then enthroned to be the Bishop of Pennsylvania And Affiliated Regions
- Bishop Angelos as a General Bishop who is currently the General Bishop for the Churches of Northern Shoubra, Cairo
- Bishop Michael as a General Bishop for the Churches established by the Pope in Virginia
- Bishop Gabriel as a General Bishop for New Jersey.

All churches that are not under the jurisdiction of an established diocese are part of the Archdiocese. As of November 11, 2017, the Archdiocese is divided administratively over the following regions:

- Archdiocese of North America - New Jersey
- Archdiocese of North America - Chicago & Midwest (Illinois, Wisconsin, Minnesota, Missouri, Iowa, Kansas, Nebraska)
- Archdiocese of North America - Virginia
- Archdiocese of Northern California and Western US
- Archdiocese of Central Canada

=== Diocese of Los Angeles, Southern California and Hawaii ===
The Diocese was established by the enthronement of Metropolitan Serapion (a General Bishop at the time) by the hands of Pope Shenouda III in November 1995.

This Diocese is served by one metropolitan and three general/auxiliary bishops:

- Metropolitan Serapion who is the first Metropolitan of the Coptic Orthodox Diocese of Los Angeles, Southern California and Hawaii.
- Bishop Kyrillos, General Bishop of Education in the Coptic Orthodox Diocese of Los Angeles, Southern California and Hawaii.
- Bishop Abraham, General Bishop of the Diakonia Ministry (Social Services) in the Coptic Orthodox Diocese of Los Angeles, Southern California and Hawaii
- Suriel, Bishop of the Diocese of Melbourne, currently serving as auxiliary to HE Metropolitan Serapion in the Coptic Orthodox Diocese of Los Angeles, Southern California and Hawaii.

The Diocese has around 41 churches, a theological school (seminary) and a charity organization called Saint Verena Charity, named after the Coptic Saint Verena). The Diocese has 17 Hegumen and 40 Presbyters. The Diocese of Los Angeles is based at 3803 W. Mission Blvd. Pomona, California 91766 USA.

The Diocese also has jurisdiction over four monastic/celibate orders:

- Coptic Orthodox Monastery of Saint Anthony the Great, in Newberry Springs. The first Coptic Orthodox Monastery in North America.
- St. Paul Abbey, in Murrieta.
- St. Katherine of Alexandria and St. Verena Coptic Orthodox Convent, in Hemet.
- St. Verena Sisterhood, in Santa Ana.

=== Diocese of the Southern United States ===
The Diocese was established by the enthronement of Bishop Youssef by the hands of Pope Shenouda III in November 1995.

Bishop Youssef (Joseph) is the Bishop of the Diocese of Southern United States and also is the Abbot of the Monastery of Most Holy Virgin Mary & Saint Moses the Strong in Corpus Christi, Texas. As of January 2021, there were 60 Churches and 39 Communities in this diocese along with a convent in Dawsonville, Georgia; several educational programs and institutions, St Stephen Christian Retreat and Conference Center in Titusville, St Clement Coptic Orthodox Christian Academy in Nashville, Triumphant Christian Retreat (TCR) Addiction Rehabilitation Center in Brooksville, FL.

The diocese is headquartered in the Dallas-Fort Worth Metroplex suburb of Colleyville, Texas.

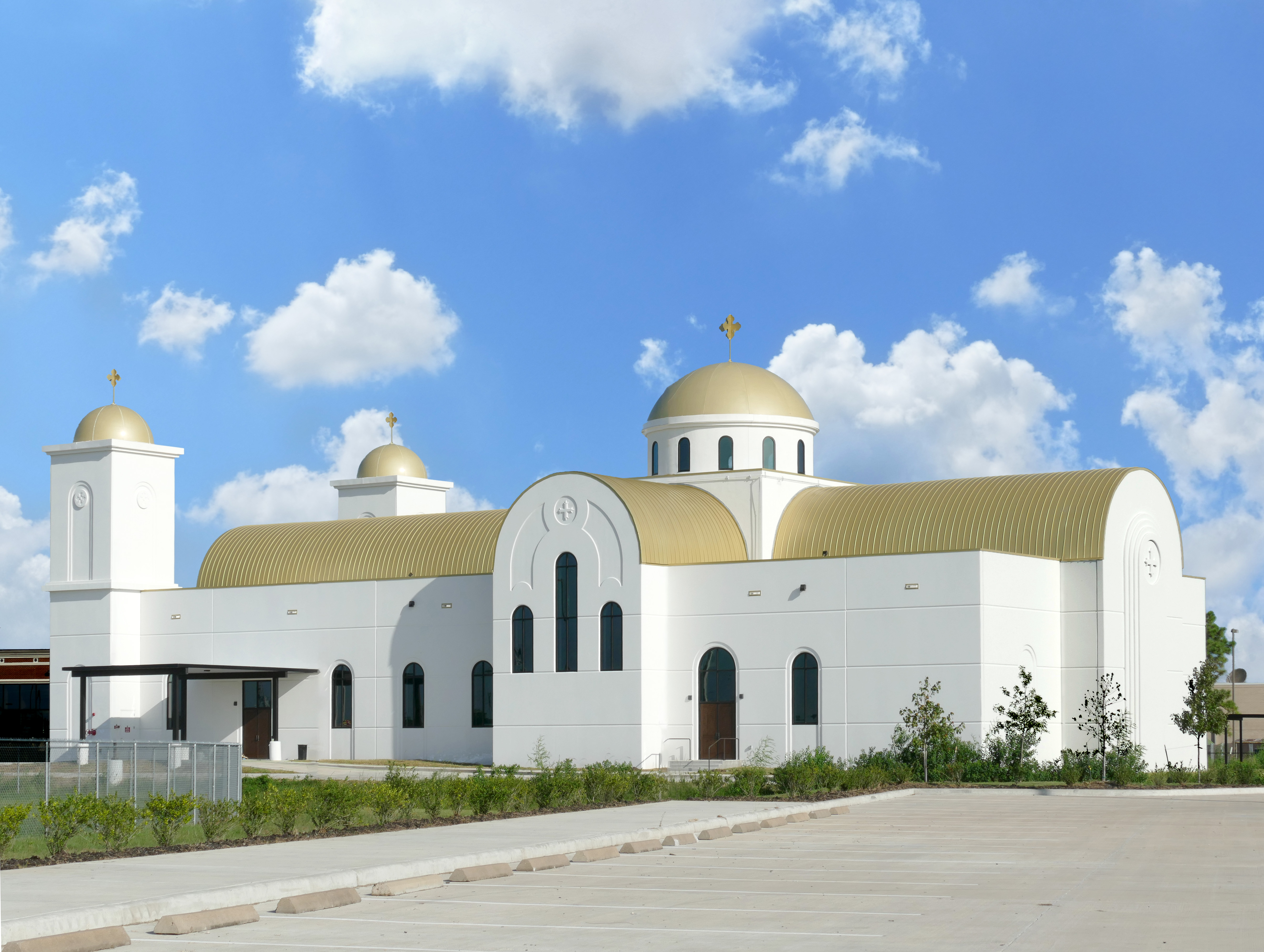
Archangel Raphael Coptic Orthodox Church -- Houston, Clear Lake City, Texas

In November 2018, Pope Tawadros II ordained two auxiliary bishops to serve alongside Bishop Youssef.

- Bishop Basil, General Bishop for the state of Florida, USA.
- Bishop Gregory, General Bishop for the states of Arizona and Texas, USA.

The territories covered under this diocese are in the following states:

- Alabama
- Arizona
- Arkansas
- Florida
- Georgia
- Louisiana
- Mississippi
- New Mexico
- Oklahoma
- Tennessee
- Texas

=== Diocese of New York and New England ===
The Diocese was established by the enthronement of Bishop David by the hands of Pope Tawadros II on November 25, 2013.

Bishop David is the Bishop of the Diocese of New York and New England.

As of March, 2017 the Diocese serves about 33 churches and has 19 Hegumen and 31 Presbyters. The territories covered under this diocese are in the following states:

- Connecticut
- Maine
- Massachusetts
- New York
- New Hampshire
- Rhode Island
- Vermont

The diocese has formally established a Monastery in The Boston Region, under the name of Virgin Mary & Pope Kyrillos VI in Charlton, Massachusetts. This is the first monastery to be established in the Diocese, and the third in North America. It is also the first monastery in the Coptic Orthodox Church to be named after Saint Pope Kyrillos VI.

=== Diocese of South Carolina, North Carolina, and Kentucky ===
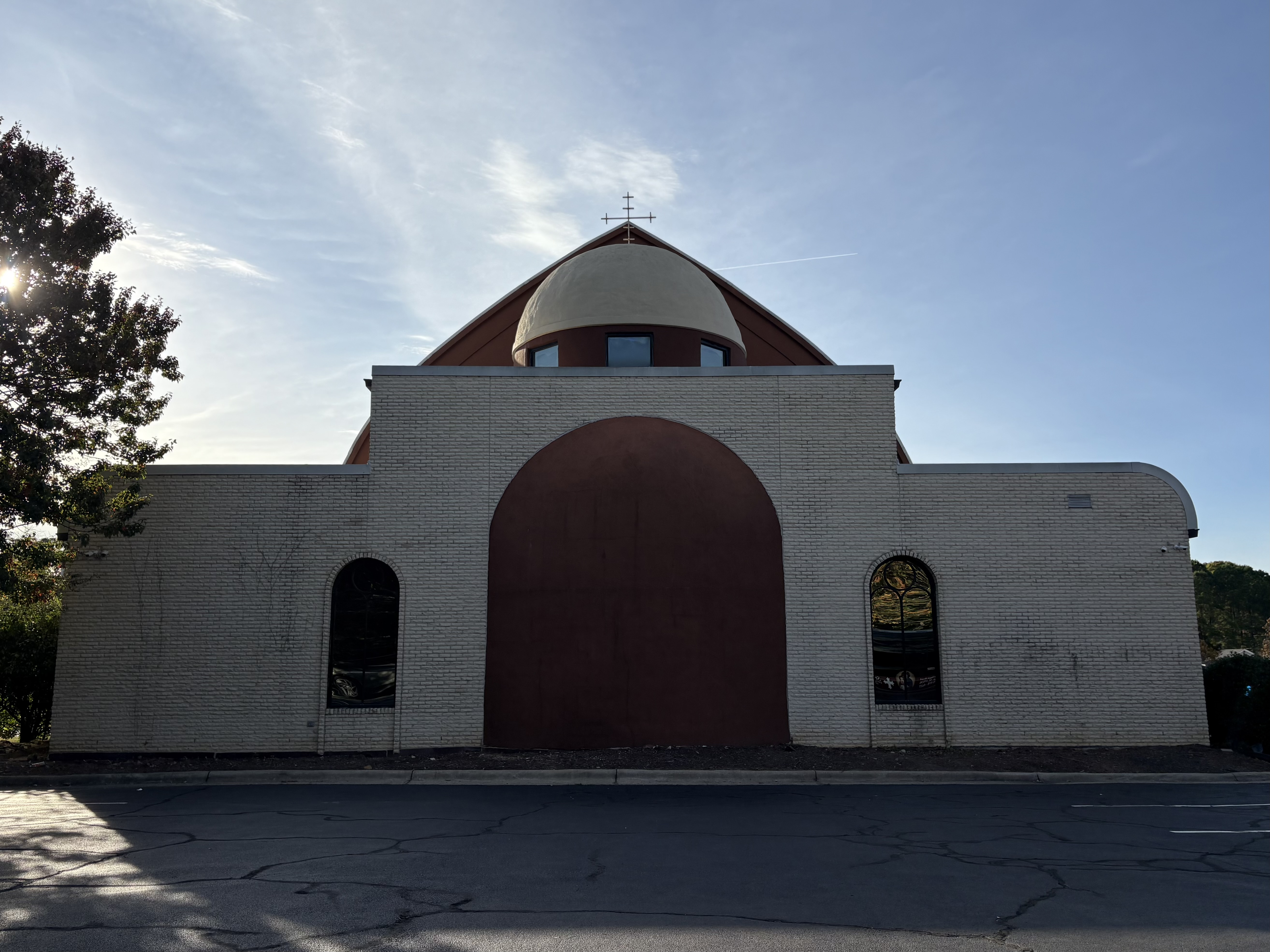
St. Mary Coptic Orthodox Cathedral in Raleigh.

The Diocese was established by the enthronement of Bishop Peter by the hands of Pope Tawadros II on June 11, 2016.

Bishop Peter is the Bishop of the Holy Diocese of South Carolina, North Carolina, and Kentucky.

This diocese currently serves approximately 12 churches and has 8 Presbyters. The diocese is headquartered at St. Mary Coptic Orthodox Cathedral in Raleigh, North Carolina. The territories covered in this diocese are in the following states:

- South Carolina
- North Carolina
- Kentucky

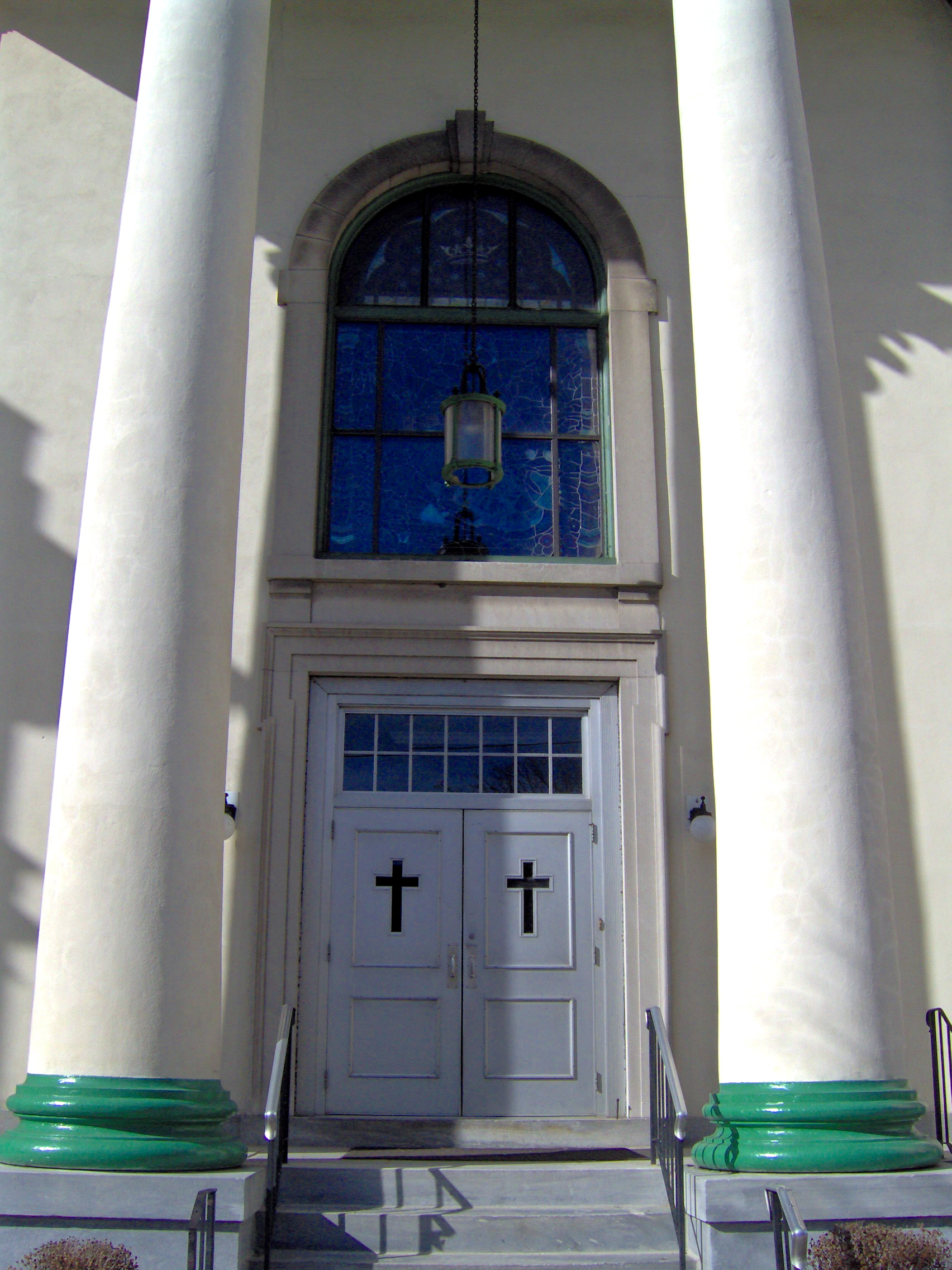
St. George Coptic Orthodox Church in Norristown, Pennsylvania (serving Philadelphia).

=== Diocese of Ohio, Michigan, and Indiana ===
The Diocese was established by the enthronement of Bishop Saraphim by the hands of Pope Tawadros II on November 11, 2017.

Bishop Saraphim is the Bishop of the Diocese of Ohio, Michigan and Indiana. There are currently 11 churches in the diocese area, several Coptic communities, as well as St. Mary and St John the Beloved convent in Warren, Ohio. The number of churches by state in this Diocese is below:

- Ohio (5)
- Michigan (5)
- Indiana (1)

=== Diocese of Pennsylvania And Affiliated Regions ===
The Diocese was established by the enthronement of Bishop Karas by the hands of Pope Tawadros II on November 11, 2017.

Bishop Karas is the Bishop of the Diocese of Pennsylvania And Affiliated Regions to currently include the states of Pennsylvania, Delaware, Maryland, and West Virginia.

There are currently 17 churches in the diocese area, several Coptic establishments, as well as St John the Beloved Coptic Orthodox Monastery in Canadensis, Pennsylvania. The number of churches by state in this Diocese is below:

- Pennsylvania (12)
- Delaware (1)
- Maryland (3)
- West Virginia (1)

== See also ==
- Copts
- Coptic American
- Copts in Canada
- Coptic diaspora
- Coptic (disambiguation)
- Coptic Orthodox Church in North America
  - List of Coptic Orthodox Churches in the United States
    - St. Mark Coptic Orthodox Church (Jersey City, New Jersey)
    - St. Mark Coptic Orthodox Church (Los Angeles)
    - St. Mark Coptic Orthodox Church (Denver, Colorado)
    - St. George Coptic Orthodox Church (Brooklyn)
    - St. Abraam Coptic Orthodox Church (Woodbury, New York)
- List of Coptic Orthodox Popes of Alexandria
- The Holy Synod of the Coptic Orthodox Church
- Oriental Orthodoxy
- British Orthodox Church
- Coptic Orthodox Church in Australia
- Coptic Orthodox Church in Canada
- Coptic Orthodox Church in Europe
- Coptic Orthodox Church in South America
- The French Coptic Orthodox Church
- Oriental Orthodoxy in North America
- Dioceses of the Coptic Orthodox Church
