= Coptic Orthodox Church in North America =

The Copts began to immigrate to the United States as early as the late 1940s. Immigration to Canada was soon to follow, and in general, this was to be the case throughout North America in the coming decades. With hundreds of Coptic Orthodox churches in the United States alone (along with over 90 congregations in Canada), it is estimated that there are over one million Coptic Orthodox Christians in North America.

In 1964, St. Mark Coptic Orthodox Church was established in Toronto; this was the first Coptic parish established in the Coptic diaspora. The Church was established by Fr. Marcos A. Marcos, under the supervision of Pope Cyril VI.

The first parish in the States, St. Mark's Coptic Orthodox Church (Jersey City) was founded in 1968 and is considered the first Coptic Orthodox Church, parish, and church building in North America, if not, the Western Hemisphere.

Decades later, Mexico had a growing Coptic Orthodox community of its own. The first, and only, Coptic Orthodox church in Mexico is St. Mary and St. Mark's Coptic Orthodox Church in Tlaycapan, Mexico, founded in 2001.

Of the Coptic Orthodox parishes in the United States, there are currently over 200 churches that serve the expanding Coptic Orthodox population there. Florida is home to many Coptic Orthodox Christians, and there are currently 21 established churches throughout the state, in order to serve the large and growing Egyptian-Christian population arising all over the state. There are many churches in North America as well as several other churches and communities in Canada.

== Episcopacy ==
=== Diocesan bishops ===
- Serapion (b. 1951), Metropolitan of the Holy Diocese of Los Angeles, Southern California and Hawaii and Abbot of the Monastery of St. Anthony in California (1995–present).
- Youssef, Metropolitan of the Southern Diocese and Abbot of the Monastery of Most Holy Virgin Mary & Saint Moses the Strong in Corpus Christi, Texas. (1995–present)
- David, Bishop of the Holy Diocese of New York and New England. (2013–present)
- Mina, Bishop of the Holy Diocese of Mississauga, Vancouver & Western Canada. (2013–present)
- Karas, Bishop of the Holy Diocese of Pennsylvania and Affiliated Regions (2016–present)
- Peter, Bishop of the Holy Diocese of South Carolina, North Carolina, and Kentucky (2017–present)
- Saraphim, Bishop of the Holy Diocese of Ohio, Michigan and Indiana (2017–present)
- Boules, Bishop of the Holy Diocese of Ottawa, Montréal & Eastern Canada. (2019–present)

=== General bishops ===
- Macarius, General Bishop and Patriarchal Exarch for the Eritrean Congregation in the USA. Member of the Eritrean and Coptic Holy Synods. (1991–present)
- Suriel, Bishop of the Diocese of Melbourne, currently serving as professor of Ecclesiastical Education at the Theological College in New Jersey. (1997; 2023 - Present)
- Michael, General Bishop in Virginia, United States, assistant to the Pope (2009–present)
- Gabriel, General Bishop in New Jersey and Patriarchal Exarch for the Archdiocese of North America, assistant to the Pope. (2022–present)

=== Auxiliary bishops ===
- Abraham, Auxiliary Bishop and assistant to Metropolitan Serapion in the Holy Diocese of Los Angeles, Southern California, and Hawaii. (2016–present)
- Kyrillos, Auxiliary Bishop and assistant to Metropolitan Serapion in the Holy Diocese of Los Angeles, Southern California, and Hawaii. (2016–present)
- Basil, Auxiliary Bishop in Florida and assistant to Metropolitan Youssef in the Holy Diocese of the Southern United States. (2018–present)
- Gregory, Auxiliary Bishop in Texas and assistant to Metropolitan Youssef in the Holy Diocese of the Southern United States. (2018–present)

=== Deceased hierarchs ===
- Karas, Bishop Abbot of the Monastery of Saint Antony the Great, in Newberry Springs, California. (1993 - 2002)

== Dioceses ==
=== Archdiocese of North America ===
Before the establishment of any dioceses in the US and Canada, all churches were part of the Archdiocese of North America under the direct care of the Patriarchate of Alexandria, led by the Pope of Alexandria, with the headquarters at Cedar Grove, New Jersey. All churches that are not under the jurisdiction of an established diocese are part of the Archdiocese. The Archdiocese serves around 74 congregations in US and 17 congregations in Canada. The Archdiocese is divided administratively over the following regions:

- Archdiocese of North America - New Jersey
- Archdiocese of North America - Chicago & Midwest (Illinois, Wisconsin, Minnesota, Missouri, Iowa, Kansas, Nebraska)
- Archdiocese of North America - Virginia
- Archdiocese of Northern California and Western US
- Archdiocese of Central Canada

The Archdiocese is currently headed by Pope Tawadros II. He is assisted by:

- Bishop Macarius, as General Bishop and Patriarchal Exarch for the Eritrean Congregation in the USA. (1991–present)
- Bishop Michael, as General Bishop in Virginia, United States. (2009–present)
- Bishop Archelides, as General Bishop in Toronto (GTA) and Central Canada. (2022–present)
- Bishop Gabriel, as General Bishop in New Jersey and Patriarchal Exarch for the Archdiocese of North America. (2022–present)

=== Dioceses in Canada ===
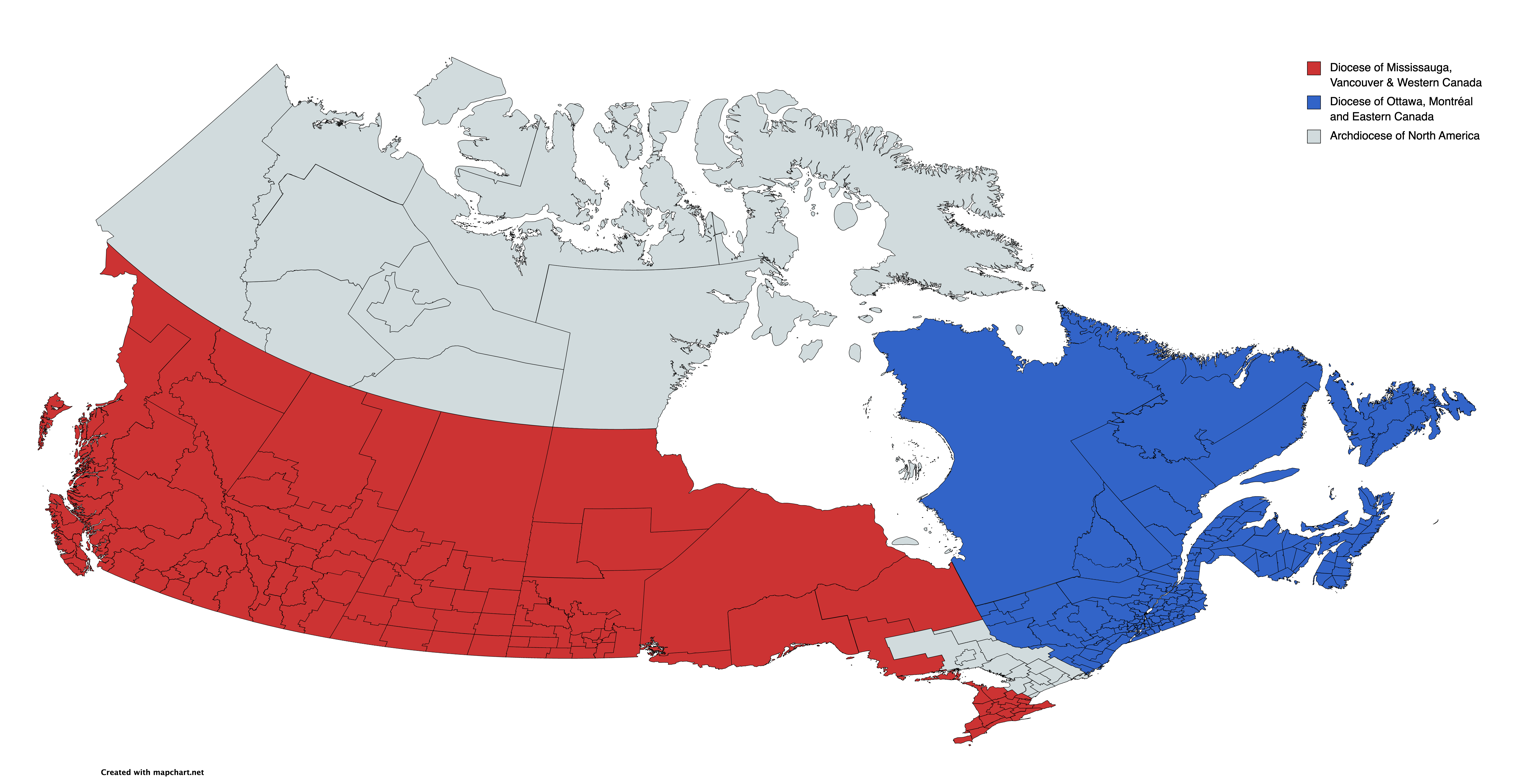
Map of the Dioceses of the Coptic Orthodox Church in Canada.

In addition to the Archdiocese of North America, there are two dioceses in Canada, serving around 53 congregations. These are:

- Diocese of Mississauga, Vancouver & Western Canada
- Diocese of Ottawa, Montréal & Eastern Canada

=== Dioceses in the United States ===
Map of the Dioceses of the Coptic Orthodox Church in the USA.

In addition to the Archdiocese of North America, there are six dioceses in the United States, serving around 213 congregations. These are:

- Diocese of Los Angeles, Southern California and Hawaii
- Diocese of the Southern United States
- Diocese of New York and New England
- Diocese of South Carolina, North Carolina, and Kentucky
- Diocese of Ohio, Michigan, and Indiana
- Diocese of Pennsylvania and Affiliated Regions

== See also ==
- Coptic
- Coptic Orthodox Church
- Coptic Orthodoxy around the world
  - Coptic Orthodox Church in the United States
    - List of Coptic Orthodox Churches in the United States
  - Coptic Orthodox Church in Canada
    - List of Coptic Orthodox Churches in Canada
  - Coptic Orthodox Church in Mexico
- St. Mark Coptic Orthodox Church (Jersey City, New Jersey)
- St. Mark Coptic Orthodox Church (Los Angeles)
- St. Mark Coptic Orthodox Church (Denver, Colorado)
- St. George Coptic Orthodox Church (Philadelphia)
- St. Abraam Coptic Orthodox Church (Woodbury, New York)
- Religion in North America
- Coptic Americans
- Coptic Canadians
- Coptic diaspora
- Oriental Orthodoxy in North America
