= St. Mary Coptic Orthodox Church (Los Angeles) =

Coptic church in Los Angeles, California, U.S.

Holy Virgin Mary Coptic Orthodox Church
- Holy Virgin Mary Coptic Orthodox Church
- 34.114237°N 118.210404°W
- Location: 4900 Cleland Ave. Los Angeles, California 90042
- Country: United States of America
- Denomination: Coptic Orthodox Church
- Website: www.theotokos.org

History
- Founded: 1974

Architecture
- Style: Coptic

Administration
- Division: The Coptic Orthodox Patriarchate
- Diocese: Diocese of Los Angeles

Clergy
- Bishop(s): Pope Tawadros II; Metropolitan Serapion; Bishop Abraham; Bishop Kyrillos
- Priest(s): Fr. Mina Youssef; Fr. James Soliman

Holy Virgin Mary Coptic Orthodox Church (Coptic: Ϯⲉⲕ'ⲕⲗⲏⲥⲓⲁ ⳿ⲛⲣⲉⲙ⳿ⲛⲭⲏⲙⲓ ⳿ⲛⲟⲣⲑⲟⲇⲟⲝⲟⲥ ⳿ⲛⲧⲉ Ϯⲡⲁⲣⲑⲉⲛⲟⲥ ⲉⲑⲟⲩⲁⲃ Ⲙⲁⲣⲓⲁ // transliteration: ti.eklyseya en.remenkimi en.orthodoxos ente ti.parthenos ethowab Maria) is the second oldest Coptic Orthodox church that was established in Los Angeles and one of the largest Coptic parishes in California. It is one of over 200 Coptic Orthodox Churches in the US.

== History ==
St. Mary's Coptic Orthodox Church of Los Angeles was founded as the second Coptic parish in Los Angeles, and was incorporated by 1974 with about 50 families at the time. The Coptic population of Los Angeles had been growing since the late 1960s, when Father Bishoy Kamel was commissioned to serve the neighboring Church of St. Mark in 1969, during Pope Cyril VI's papacy. Fr. Bishoy was a prominent Copt, being considered a modern-day saint within the Church, having helped found St. Mark's as well as several other parishes and buildings throughout Egypt, the United States, Europe, and Australia.

=== Expansion ===
St. Mary's Church, on the other hand, was founded in the Highland Park community within the City of Los Angeles, near Pasadena. In November 1989, a new Coptic-designed church that had replaced the original church building was consecrated by Pope Shenouda III, making it the first church in California that was built in the Coptic style. Dr. Isaac Fanous, a Coptic iconographer, eagerly completed the treasury of icons that were inside of the church in September 1996.

An additional church, chapel bearing the name of St. Bishoy, was completed in January 2004 in the lower-level of the building, built specifically for serving the English-speaking congregation.

=== Priests ===
From the time of its establishment in 1974, St. Mary's Church was served by Hegomen (Archpriest) Fr. Antonious Henein until his repose in 2006. The church is currently served by Fr. Mina Youssef, who began serving the church in 1995 and was ordained to the priestly rank of Hegomen in December 2006; together with Fr. James Soliman, who was ordained to the priesthood in November 2003.

=== Services & activities ===
The church offers many services for its continuously growing congregation. Arabic, Coptic, English, and Spanish classes are offered for those who would like to learn as well as Pre-Servants class which is offered on Saturday nights after vespers to help prepare the high school and college youth on their journey to become a Sunday school servant or a servant of the church. The church also plans many activities for the youth and the adults to attend, such as an annual dinner cruise, a 3-day family retreat, an annual youth trip, and many monastery and service trips. There are also many volunteer opportunities for the youth at the church, like serving at the annual Halloween festival and the Kids Camp.

== Today ==
Several years after St. Mary's Church was incorporated, in 1995, the Coptic Orthodox Diocese of Los Angeles, Southern California and Hawaii was founded. Pope Tawadros II, who is the current Pope of Alexandria, enthroned Serapion as Bishop for the diocese, which includes St. Mary's Church as well as several other diocesan churches.

Two services of the Divine Liturgy are celebrated on Sunday mornings: one for the Arabic-speaking congregation in the main church on the upper-level of the building; and the other for the English-speaking congregation in Saint Bishoy Church located on the lower-level.

There are currently almost 800 Coptic families served by St. Mary's Church alone, with several others belonging to various church congregations throughout California.

== See also ==
- Coptic Orthodox Church of Alexandria
- Seat of the Coptic Orthodox Pope of Alexandria
- Coptic architecture
- Coptic Cairo
- Coptic Orthodox Church in North America
