= St. Abraam Coptic Orthodox Church =

- Ϯⲉⲕ⳿ⲕⲗⲏⲥⲓⲁ ⳿ⲛⲣⲉⲙ⳿ⲛⲭⲏⲙⲓ ⳿ⲛⲟⲣⲑⲟⲇⲟⲝⲟⲥ ⳿ⲛⲧⲉ ⲫⲏⲉⲑⲟⲩⲁⲃ Ⲁⲃⲣⲁⲁⲙ ti.eklyseya en.remenkimi en.orthodoxos ente fi.ethowab Abra'am
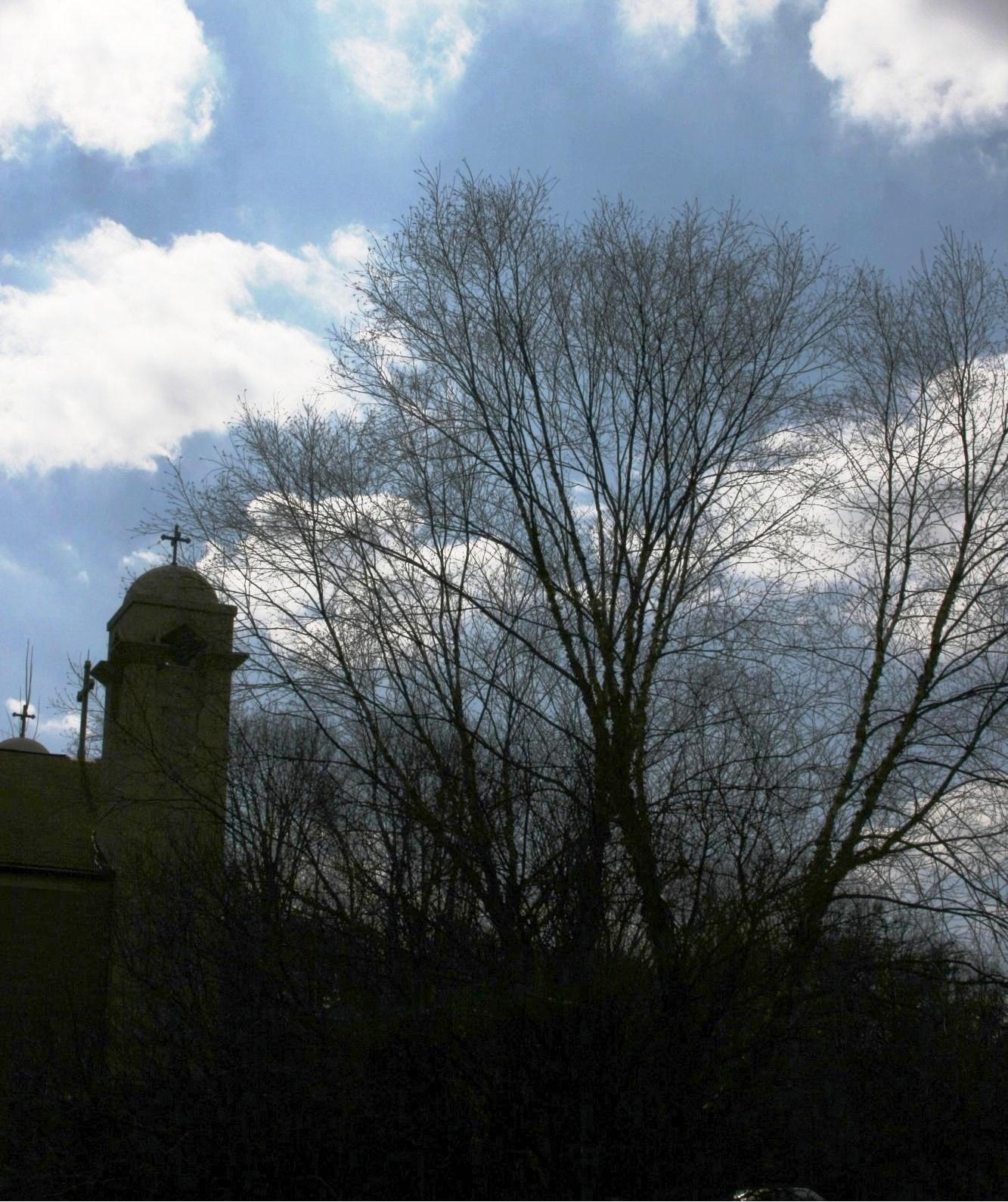
- A view of St. Abraam's Church from outside.

- Location in New York
- 40.831083°N 73.456369°W
- Location: Woodbury, New York (Long Island)
- Country: United States of America
- Denomination: Coptic Orthodox
- Website: http://www.stabraam.org/

History
- Status: Cathedral
- Dedication: Abraam, Bishop of Faiyum
- Consecrated: 12 January 1992

Architecture
- Functional status: Active
- Style: Coptic

Administration
- Diocese: New York and New England

Clergy
- Bishop: Bishop David
- Priest: The Rev. Priest Fr. Joseph Loka

St Abraam Coptic Orthodox Church (Coptic: Ϯⲉⲕ⳿ⲕⲗⲏⲥⲓⲁ ⳿ⲛⲣⲉⲙ⳿ⲛⲭⲏⲙⲓ ⳿ⲛⲟⲣⲑⲟⲇⲟⲝⲟⲥ ⳿ⲛⲧⲉ ⲫⲏⲉⲑⲟⲩⲁⲃ Ⲁⲃⲣⲁⲁⲙ // transliteration: ti.eklyseya en.remenkimi en.orthodoxos ente fi.ethowab Abra'am) is a Coptic Orthodox parish in Woodbury, New York. It is one of over 200 Coptic Orthodox Churches in the United States.

== History of the Building ==
St. Abraam Coptic Orthodox Church was incorporated by 20 families residing in Long Island in January 1978, only five years after the first Coptic Orthodox parishes in New York were founded in Ridgewood, Queens and Brooklyn, New York. For over a decade, these families used a Ukrainian church in Hicksville for accommodating weekly Liturgies. In September 1989, Pope Shenouda III blessed the endowned lands in preparation for building the church.

After the church was built in 1990, in a pastoral visit by Pope Shenouda, the parish was consecrated on 12 January 1992. It was the first Coptic Orthodox Church in Long Island, New York.

St. Abraam Coptic Orthodox Church serves areas in and around Long Island, particularly in Nassau County, which is just east of Queens. The closest Coptic Orthodox parish is St. Mary & St. Antonios Coptic Orthodox Church, in Ridgewood, Queens. St. Abraam Coptic Orthodox Church was served by multiple priests such as Fr. Micheal Tobia of East Brunswick NJ, Fr. Marcos Ghaly of Toledo, Ohio, as the Coptic Orthodox clergy in North America often visit or temporarily serve churches that are still developing. However, from recent years, Fr. Girgis Tadros was made a permanent priest of the church up until now. St. Abraam Coptic Orthodox Church currently has two priests, The Very Rev. Fr. Guirguis Tadros, The Very Rev. Fr. Moussa Shafik, and The Very Rev. Joseph Loka. There are currently about 600 Coptic families served by St. Abraam Coptic Orthodox Church.

The Coptic Orthodox Diocese of New York and New England was officially established in 2013 by Pope Tawadros II. Bishop David was consecrated in formal ceremonies taking place in Cairo, Egypt on November 16–17, 2013. Bishop David was formally enthroned on December 7, 2013 at St. Abraam Coptic Orthodox Church in a ceremony that brought together thousands of the Coptic faithful, clergy, and dignitaries. This church is now the seat of the bishop.

== See also ==
- Coptic Orthodox Church
- Seat of the Coptic Orthodox Pope of Alexandria
- Coptic architecture
- Coptic Cairo
- Coptic Orthodox Church in North America
  - Coptic Orthodox Church in Canada
  - Coptic Orthodox Church in the United States
  - List of Coptic Orthodox Churches in the United States
    - St. George Coptic Orthodox Church (Philadelphia)
    - St. George Coptic Orthodox Church (Brooklyn)
    - St. George & St. Shenouda Coptic Orthodox Church (Jersey City, New Jersey)
    - St. Mark Coptic Orthodox Church (Jersey City, New Jersey)
    - St. Mark Coptic Orthodox Church (Los Angeles)
    - St. Mary Coptic Orthodox Church (Lancaster, Pennsylvania)
    - St. Mary Coptic Orthodox Church (Los Angeles)
