= St. Mark Coptic Orthodox Church (Los Angeles) =

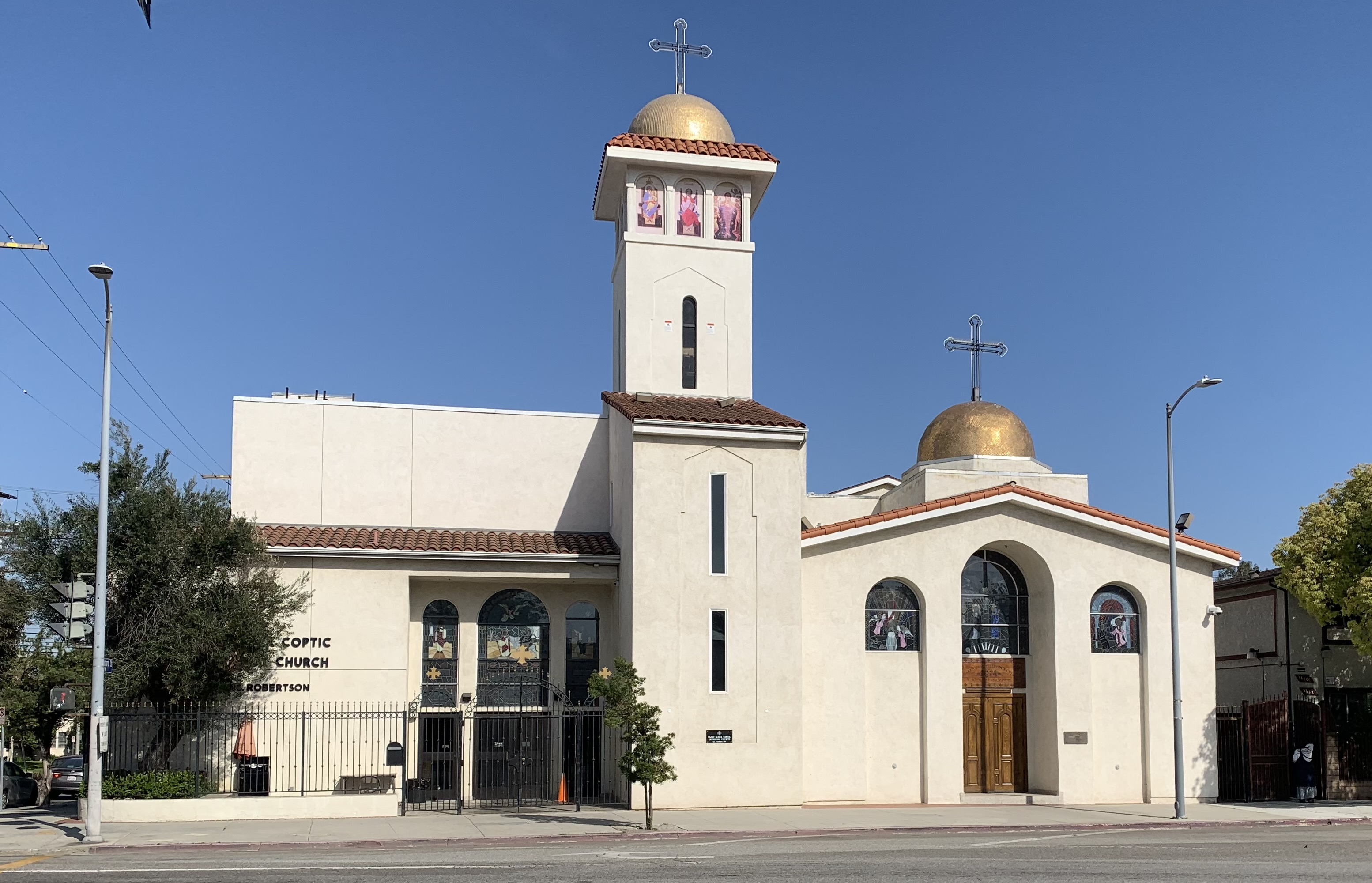
- St. Mark Coptic Orthodox Church
- 34.05034°N 118.38405°W
- Location: 1600 South Robertson Blvd. Los Angeles, CA 90035
- Country: United States of America
- Denomination: Coptic Orthodox Church
- Website: www.stmarkla.org

History
- Founded: 1970

Architecture
- Architectural type: Church
- Style: Coptic

Administration
- Division: The Coptic Orthodox Patriarchate
- Diocese: Diocese of Los Angeles

Clergy
- Bishop(s): Pope Theodoros II; Metropolitan Serapion; Bishop Abraham; Bishop Kyrillos; Bishop Suriel
- Priest(s): Fr. Raphael Hanna; Fr. Rewies Antoun

St Mark Coptic Orthodox Church (Coptic: Ϯⲉⲕ'ⲕⲗⲏⲥⲓⲁ ⳿ⲛⲣⲉⲙ⳿ⲛⲭⲏⲙⲓ ⳿ⲛⲟⲣⲑⲟⲇⲟⲝⲟⲥ ⳿ⲛⲧⲉ ⲫⲏⲉⲑⲟⲩⲁⲃ Ⲙⲁⲣⲕⲟⲥ // transliteration: ti.eklyseya en.remenkimi en.orthodoxos ente fi.ethowab Markos) is a Coptic Orthodox church in Los Angeles and is one of the oldest Coptic parishes established in the United States. It is one of over 200 Coptic Orthodox churches in the US.

== History of the Church ==
St. Mark's Coptic Orthodox Church of Los Angeles was founded as the second Coptic parish in the United States, and was incorporated by 1970 with about 200 families at the time. The Coptic families in Los Angeles started settling from around the late 1960s when the late Father Bishoy Kamel was commissioned to serve the church in 1969, during Pope Cyril VI's papacy. Fr. Bishoy was a prominent Copt, being considered a modern-day saint within the Church, and helped to found not only St. Mark's but several other parishes and buildings throughout Egypt, the United States, Europe and Australia.

The congregation initially used a Syriac Orthodox building to accommodate its liturgies. Then, the congregation eventually purchased the current building which was previously used by the Russian Orthodox. Several years later, in 1995, the Coptic Orthodox Diocese of Los Angeles, Southern California and Hawaii was founded. Pope Shenouda III, the Pope of Alexandria (at the time), enthroned HG Serapion as Bishop for the diocese, which includes St. Mark's Church as well as several other diocese churches. There are currently about 650 Coptic families served by St. Mark's Church with several others belonging to different church congregations throughout California.

== See also ==
- Coptic Orthodox Church
- Seat of the Coptic Orthodox Pope of Alexandria
- Coptic architecture
- Coptic Cairo
- Coptic Orthodox Church in North America
