= Coptic Orthodox Diocese of New York and New England =

Coordinates: 40.59968°N 74.11426°W

Diocese of New York and New England

Location
- Country: United States
- Territory: Connecticut, Maine, Massachusetts, New Hampshire, New York, Rhode Island, Vermont

Statistics
- Population: Total: (as of 2015); 22,935,940
- Parishes: 33

Information
- Denomination: Oriental Orthodox
- Rite: Coptic Orthodox
- Established: 16 November 2013
- Cathedral: Saint Mina and Pope Kyrillos VI Cathedral, Chestnut Ridge, New York
- Secular priests: 50

Current leadership
- Pope: Pope Tawadros II
- Bishop: Bishop David

Website
- www.nynecopts.org

The Coptic Orthodox Diocese of New York and New England, also referred to as the Coptic Diocese of New York, is a diocese of the Coptic Orthodox Church of Alexandria. It was founded in 2013 and encompasses the states of Connecticut, Maine, Massachusetts, New Hampshire, New York, Rhode Island and Vermont in the United States of America. Bishop David was appointed diocesan bishop when the diocese was created.

== History ==
=== Early community ===
Coptic Immigration to the United States began in the late 19th and early 20th centuries. Most of these early immigrants came on temporary scholarships and education visas, as the National Origins Formula used by the United States at the time barred Egyptians, among other non-Northern Europeans, from becoming US Citizens. After the full implementation of the 1965 Immigration Act, the restrictions set forth by the National Origins Formula were repealed and Copts were able to gain entry into the United States with permanent resident status. Many Copts thus immigrated to the USA in search of religious freedom, political stability, and economic opportunity. By the 1970s, many of those newly immigrated Copts had settled in New York and New England, and their numbers continued to grow as the years went on. For many years, the few Coptic churches there were administered by the Archdiocese of North America (which is under the auspices of the Pope of the Coptic Orthodox Church). Bishop David, the current bishop of the diocese, had formerly served only as a general bishop in New England under the aforementioned archdiocese for several years, formally under Pope Shenouda III.

=== Diocese ===
By the 2010s, the Coptic population had grown sufficiently large to support an independent diocese. Pope Tawadros II created the Diocese of New York and New England out of the geographic areas written in the name of the diocese; its territory was taken from the Archdiocese of North America. Pope Tawadros called upon Bishop David, to be diocesan bishop for the diocese in a two-day ceremony from November 16–17, 2013, in Cairo, Egypt. An official enthronement ceremony for Bishop David took place on 7 December 2013 at St. Abraam Coptic Orthodox Church in Woodbury, New York. As a diocesan bishop, Bishop David has the authority to ordain priests for the diocese's churches, in accordance with the needs and capabilities of the respective church congregations.

The current Seat of the bishopric is located at the Saint Mina and Pope Kyrillos VI Cathedral in Chestnut Ridge, New York.

== Demographics ==
Year	Membership	Priests			Parishes
Year	Membership	Hegumen	Presbyters	Total	Parishes
2013	-	-	-	-	-
2014	-	-	-	-	-
2015	-	19	31	50	26
2021		18	23	41	33

== Current parishes ==
=== Parishes ===
==== Connecticut ====
- Virgin Mary and Archangel Michael Coptic Orthodox Church, Hamden
- The Holy Theotokos and Saint Athanasius Coptic Orthodox Church, Cheshire
- St. Peter and St. Andrew Coptic Orthodox Church, Stamford
- St. Mary and St. Moses the Strong Coptic Orthodox Church, Waterford

==== Maine ====
- St. Mark and St. Bishoy Coptic Orthodox Church, Bangor (formerly St. Pishoy and St. Karas, Brewer)

==== Massachusetts ====
- St. Mark Coptic Orthodox Church, Natick
- St. Mary and St. George Coptic Orthodox Church, Scituate
- St. Paul and St. John Chrysostom Coptic Orthodox Church, Boston
- The Holy Family Coptic Orthodox Church, Attleboro
- St. Philopateer and St. Mina Coptic Orthodox Church, Wayland
- St. Mary and St. Demiana Coptic Orthodox Church, Fall River
- St. Mary and St. Tomas Coptic Orthodox Church, Gardner
- St. Shenouda and St. Karas Coptic Orthodox Church, Linwood
- Holy Virgin Mary Spiritual Vineyard (El-Karma), Charlton

==== New Hampshire ====
- St. Mary and Archangel Michael Coptic Orthodox Church, Nashua

==== New York ====
- Archangel Michael and St. Mena Coptic Orthodox Church, Great Kills (Staten Island)
- St. Abraam Coptic Orthodox Church, Woodbury (Long Island)
- St. George Coptic Orthodox Church, Astoria (Queens)
- St. George Coptic Orthodox Church, Brooklyn
- St. Helena and St. Anasimone Coptic Orthodox Church, Flushing (Queens)
- St. Mary and St. Mark Coptic Orthodox Church, Manhattan
- St. Mark Coptic Orthodox Church, West Henrietta
- St. Mary and St. Antonios Coptic Orthodox Church, Ridgewood (Queens)
- St. Mary and St. Demiana Coptic Orthodox Church, White Plains
- St. Mary and St. George Coptic Orthodox Church, Albany
- St. Mary and St. Mina Coptic Orthodox Church, Syracuse
- St. Mary and St. Moses the Black Coptic Orthodox Church, North Tonawanda
- Virgin Mary and St. George Coptic Orthodox Church, Tottenville (Staten Island)
- Virgin Mary and St. Pachomius Coptic Orthodox Church, Stony Point
- Saint Mina and Pope Kyrillos VI Cathedral, Chestnut Ridge
- Saint Mary Christian Center Todt Hill, Staten Island
- Holy Apostles Coptic Orthodox Church, Bronx

==== Rhode Island ====
- St. Mary and St. Mena Coptic Orthodox Church, Hope
- St. Mary and St. Mena Coptic Orthodox Church, Cranston

==== Vermont ====
- St. Mary and Archangel Raphael Coptic Orthodox Church, Burlington

=== Communities and missions ===
Coptic Orthodox communities and missions are congregations of Copts who gather for religious services but do not have a sufficient number of people to support a full parish.

==== Connecticut ====
- Coptic Community, Waterbury

==== New York ====
- St. Peter and St. Paul Coptic Orthodox Mission, Rochester

=== Monastery ===
The diocese had previously announced plans to formally establish a monastery in the Boston region, under the name of Virgin Mary & Pope Kyrillos VI in Charlton, Massachusetts. This would be the first monastery to be established in the diocese, and the third in North America. It would also be the first monastery in the history of the Coptic Orthodox Church to be named after Saint Pope Kyrillos VI. As of September 2022, plans for this monastery are currently set for it to be established in Dover Plains, New York, under the same name.

== Response to allegations of sexual abuse ==
In response to allegations of sexual abuse within neighboring dioceses, on July 22, 2020, the diocese announced that it would be working to prevent sexual abuse. Further, they stated " If anyone is aware of any suspected incident of sexual abuse of a minor by any such person, we urge you to immediately report to law enforcement and also to your Regional Vicar..." They further stated that they will put in all efforts to curb such conduct.
