= St. George Coptic Orthodox Church (Brooklyn) =

Coordinates: 40°37′38.9″N 74°0′24.4″W

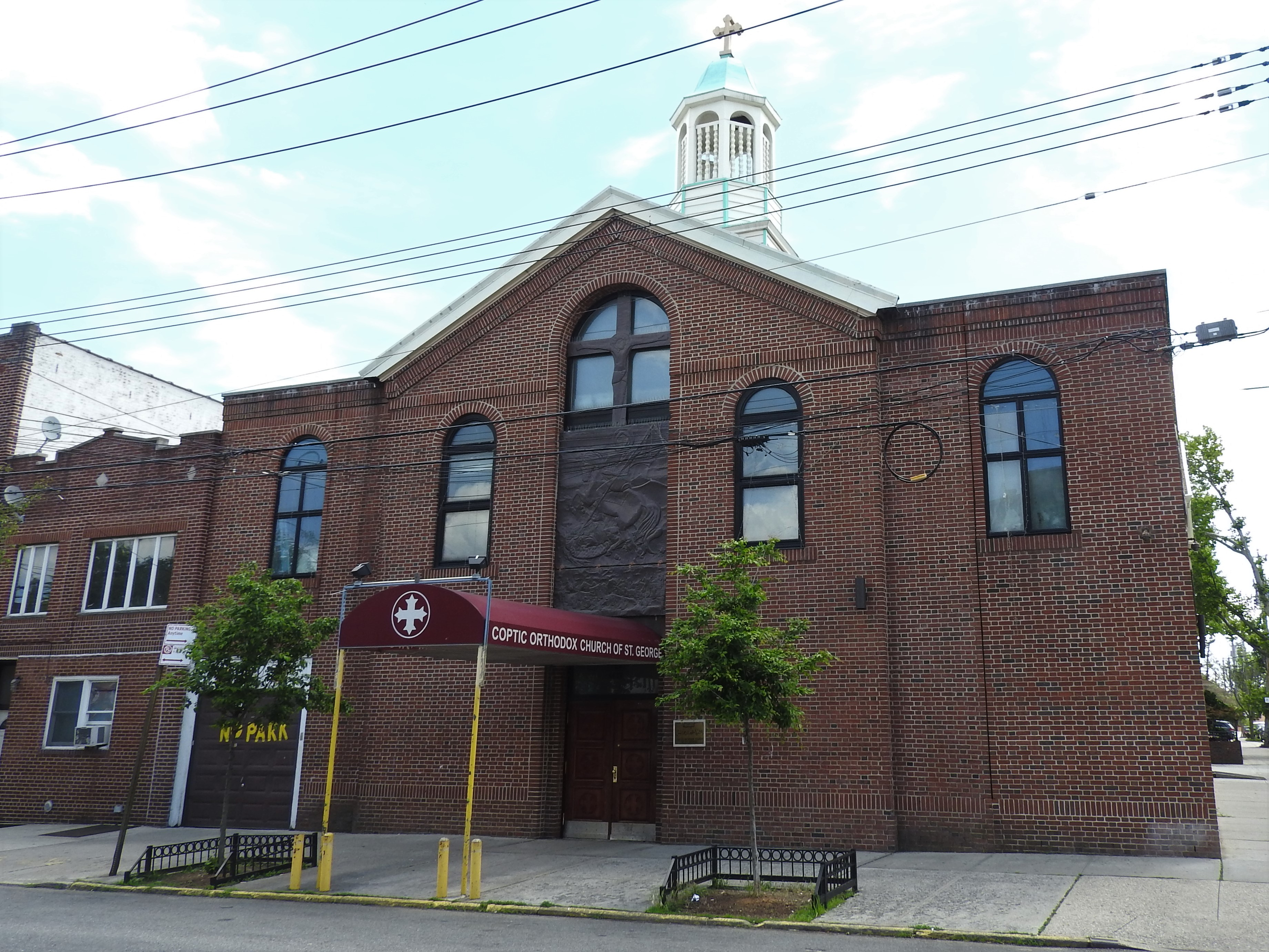
- St. George Coptic Orthodox Church
- Location: 1105 67th Street Brooklyn NY 11219
- Country: United States
- Denomination: Coptic Orthodox Church
- Website: http://www.stgeorgebklyn.org/

History
- Founded: 1973

Architecture
- Architectural type: church
- Style: Coptic

Administration
- Division: The Coptic Orthodox Patriarchate
- Diocese: Archdiocese of North America, under the Pope of Alexandria

Clergy
- Bishop: Pope Theodoros II
- Priest(s): Fr. Mina K. Yanni; Fr. Armia Toufiles; Fr. Luke Awad; Fr. Gabriel Assad; Fr. Michael Dosse; Fr. Samwel Hanna

St George Coptic Orthodox Church (Coptic: Ϯⲉⲕ'ⲕⲗⲏⲥⲓⲁ ⳿ⲛⲣⲉⲙ⳿ⲛⲭⲏⲙⲓ ⳿ⲛⲟⲣⲑⲟⲇⲟⲝⲟⲥ ⳿ⲛⲧⲉ ⲫⲏⲉⲑⲟⲩⲁⲃ Ⲅⲉ⳿ⲱⲣⲅⲓⲟⲥ // transliteration: ti.eklyseya en.remenkimi en.orthodoxos ente fi.ethowab Gewargios) is one of the oldest Coptic Orthodox churches in North America. It is one of over 200 Coptic Orthodox churches in the United States.

== History ==
St. George Coptic Orthodox Church in Dyker Heights Brooklyn, New York, was founded as the second Coptic parish in New York City, and was incorporated by 1973 with only 60 families at the time. The first one was actually St. Mary & St. Antonios Coptic Orthodox Church in Ridgewood, Queens, and, like St. George Church, there were many others to follow. Somewhat farther east, in Long Island, St. Abraam Coptic Orthodox Church was founded by the late 70's to serve the congregation in that region. However, one of the more prominent parishes that was recently founded is St. Mark Coptic Orthodox Church, the first Coptic church that was established in densely populated borough of Manhattan.

Although St. George Church was officially established as of 1973, the first liturgy was actually celebrated on December 31, 1972, after the current building was bought from the American Baptist Church.

=== Priests ===
Fr. Mina K. Yanni served as priest for St. George Church from its early foundations until the present. Pope Shenouda III elevated Fr. Mina to the rank of Archpriest on August 16, 1978. Two other priests were eventually ordained and serve St. George Church alongside Fr. Mina. Fr. Armia Taofiles, who has served since Nov. 2000, as well as Fr. Luke Awad, who became priest as of 2005, and Father Gabriel Assad that was ordained in 2015 and is the 4th priest in this church. In January 2018, Fr. Armia was elevated to the rank of Archpriest. In February 2018, both Fr. Michael Dosse and Fr. Samwel Hanna were then ordained to be the fifth and sixth priests of this church. There have been pastors at St. George Church up until the present.

=== Expansion ===
Even as St. George Church mainly served those who settled in Brooklyn, other areas were outreached over the years. Surrounding areas in New York's other boroughs as well as some parts of New Jersey were outreached until churches were built there.

The building at the eastern corner of 11th Avenue and 67th Street in Dyker Heights, being one of the few structures in North America that was bought by the Copts from the beginning of the congregation's establishment, was expanded and redeveloped multiple times:

- The first expansion occurred in 1984, when a new church was built bearing the name of Saint Mina the Miracle Worker. It was established with a seating capacity of about 40 people.
- The second expansion occurred in 1986 to increase the seating capacity of St. George Church from 180 to 250.
- The third expansion started out in 1996, when new Sunday School classes were built in the traditional Coptic style. This expansion was much larger than the first one and took longer to finish.
- The project was completed by 1998 to further increase the capacity for 500 people and also to make some other additions.

=== Publications ===
St. George Church published many of the first Coptic Orthodox publications in North America. These publications include the Coptic calendar, launched in 1977, as well as the first Agpeya that was translated into English (using the original Coptic texts). Several of Pope Shenouda's books, lectures, and sermons were republished by the church and sent to various places.

On March 20, 1994, the Virgin Mary was said to have blessed St. George Church by seeping holy oil from one of her icons. A special place was constructed for this icon in the church building, which is visited by many Copts and non-Copts as well.

== Today ==
Pope Shenouda III visited the congregation three times before its consecration on April 14, 1977, second on April 20, 1989, and on March 12, 1992. Pope Shenouda eventually consecrated the church on Sunday, September 6, 1998.

There are currently over 600 Coptic families served by St. George's Church alone with several others belonging to other Coptic Orthodox congregations throughout New York.

== See also ==
- Coptic Orthodox Church
- Seat of the Coptic Orthodox Pope of Alexandria
- Coptic architecture
- Coptic Cairo
- Coptic Orthodox Church in North America
  - Coptic Orthodox Church in Canada
  - Coptic Orthodox Church in the United States
  - List of Coptic Orthodox Churches in the United States
    - St. George Coptic Orthodox Church (Philadelphia)
    - St. Abraam Coptic Orthodox Church (Woodbury, New York)
    - St. Mark Coptic Orthodox Church (Jersey City, New Jersey)
    - St. Mary & St. Antonios Coptic Orthodox Church (Ridgewood, Queens)
    - St. George & St. Shenouda Coptic Orthodox Church (Jersey City, New Jersey)
