= St. Mary & St. Antonios Coptic Orthodox Church =

Coordinates: 40°42′21″N 73°54′28″W

St. Mary & St. Antonios Coptic Church
- St Mary and St. Antonios Coptic Orthodox Church
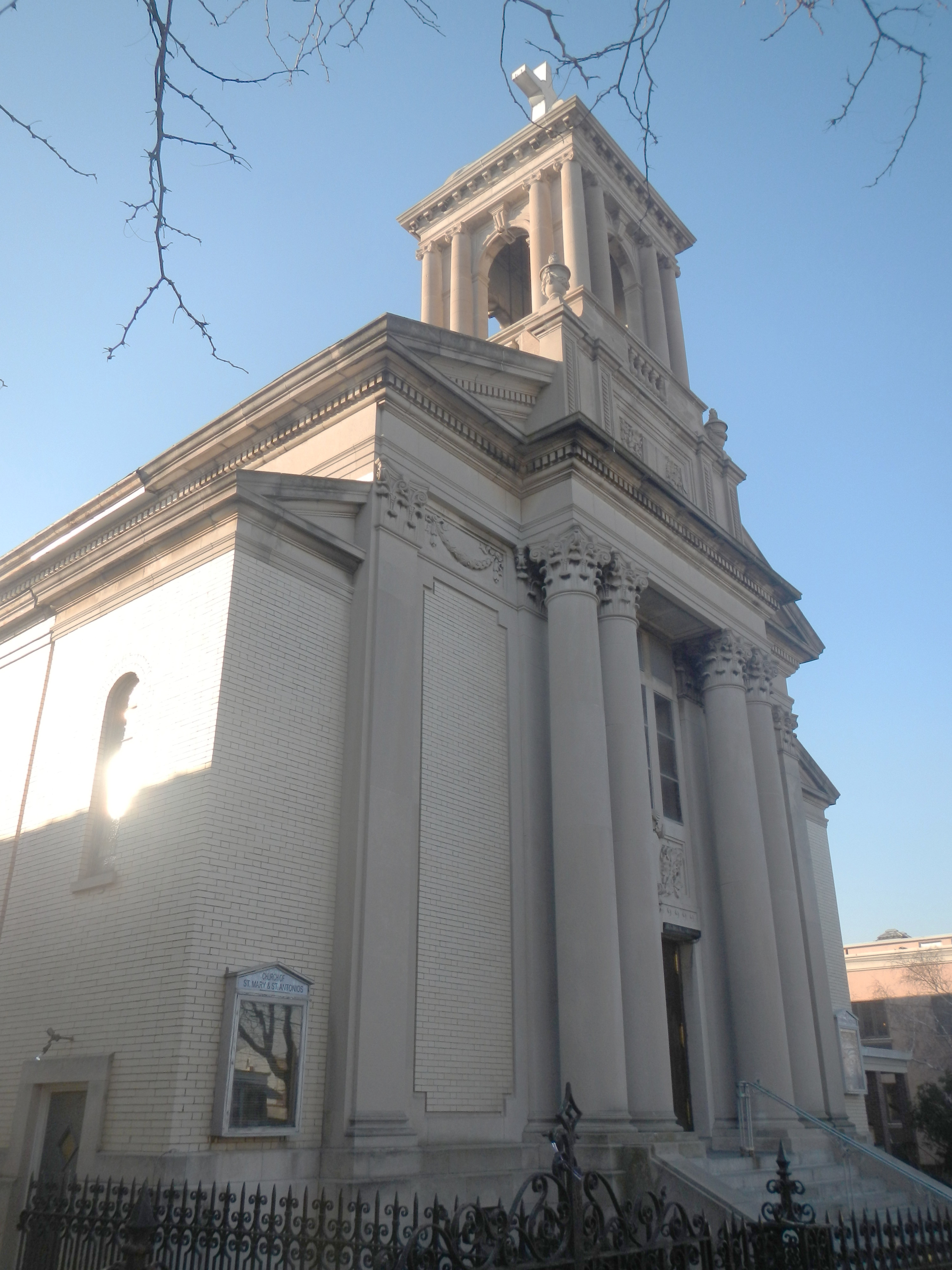
- St. Mary & St. Antonios Coptic Church
- Location: 606 Woodward Ave Ridgewood, NY 11385
- Country: United States of America
- Denomination: Coptic Orthodox Church
- Website: copticchurch.org

History
- Founded: 1972

Architecture
- Style: Coptic
- Years built: 1989

Administration
- Division: Coptic Orthodox Patriarchate
- Diocese: Archdiocese of North America, under the Pope of Alexandria

Clergy
- Bishop: Pope Theodoros II
- Priest(s): Fr. Yohanna Girgis; Fr. Antonios Makarious; Fr. Eshak Gerges; Fr. Jacob E. Zakher

St Mary and St. Antonios Coptic Orthodox Church (Coptic: Ϯ transliteration: ti.eklyseya en.remenkimi en.orthodoxos ente fi.ethowab Maria nem fi.ethowab Antonios) is located in Ridgewood, Queens and was the oldest Coptic Orthodox parish in Queens. It is one of the 287 Coptic Orthodox Churches in the United States.

== History ==
St. Mary & St. Antonios Church, being one of the oldest Coptic Orthodox churches in North America, started in March 1972, and is the first Coptic Orthodox parish in New York as well as the third Coptic parish in the US, the first two being St. Mark Coptic Orthodox Church in Jersey City and St. Mark Coptic Orthodox Church in Los Angeles. After a few months, however, St. George Coptic Orthodox Church was established in Brooklyn, and eventually, Coptic parishes started popping up throughout New York City as well as up-state New York. This led to the establishment of about 15 Coptic Orthodox Churches in New York State.

After the church was built, in a pastoral visit by Pope Shenouda III, the parish was consecrated in September 1989. The liturgies are currently held by three priests, as there are over 300 Coptic families served by St. Mary & St. Antonios Church.

== See also ==
- Coptic Orthodox Church
- List of Coptic Orthodox Churches in the United States
  - St. Mark Coptic Orthodox Church (Jersey City, New Jersey)
  - St. George Coptic Orthodox Church (Brooklyn)
  - St. Abraam Coptic Orthodox Church (Woodbury, New York)
  - St. George & St. Shenouda Coptic Orthodox Church (Jersey City, New Jersey)
