= Diocese of Los Ángeles =

Diocese of Los Ángeles can refer to:

- Roman Catholic Diocese of Los Ángeles, Chile
- Episcopal Diocese of Los Angeles, California
- Roman Catholic Archdiocese of Los Angeles, California
- Coptic Orthodox Diocese of Los Angeles, Southern California, and Hawaii
