= Coptic Orthodox Diocese of Los Angeles, Southern California, and Hawaii =

COPTIC ORTHODOX DIOCESE OF Los Angeles, Southern California and Hawaii

Location
- Country: USA
- Jurisdiction: Southern California and Hawaii

Leadership
- Pope: Tawadros II
- Metropolitan: Serapion
- Auxilary Bishops: Bishop Abraham; Bishop Kyrillos

History
- Established: 1995

Information
- Denomination: Oriental Orthodox
- Church: Coptic Orthodox Church
- Rite: Alexandrian Rite
- Calendar: Coptic Calendar
- Languages: Coptic, Arabic, English

Website
- https://www.lacopts.org/

The Coptic Orthodox Diocese of Los Angeles, Southern California and Hawaii, is a diocese of the Coptic Orthodox Church, which was founded in 1995. It is currently headed by Metropolitan Serapion the bishop of Los Angeles, and Metropolitan of Southern California and Hawaii.

== History ==
=== Early Coptic community ===
After the passing of the 1965 Immigration Act, more Copts were able to gain entry into the United States in search of religious freedom, political stability, and economic opportunity. Copts who had migrated to Southern California found its climate to be similar to the one they left behind in Egypt, and encouraged their relatives to move there as well; as a result of this, the number of Copts in Southern California jumped from just about 50 individuals in 1963, to being in the hundreds within the following years. During these early years, there were no local churches or clergy in the region, and the Liturgy was held by visiting clergy once a year. Some of the congregation were also attending the Liturgies of other Orthodox denominations on a regular basis, and attending Bible Study meetings at homes.

In 1969, Pope Kyrillos VI, sent Fr. Bishoy Kamel, and Fr. Tadros Malaty to serve the congregation. By 1970, the first Coptic Church in Los Angeles was established, being Saint Mark Coptic Orthodox Church. In late 1973 a local member of the Congregation, Fr. Antonious Henein, was ordained a priest to especially serve in Los Angeles. After his return to the U.S. in 1974, a second church was purchased, Holy Virgin Mary Coptic Orthodox Church, in Los Angeles.

In 1977, Pope Shenouda III, visited the region during his two months pastoral journey to the diaspora. During his visit he observed the need for service development throughout the Diaspora and especially in Southern California. In 1980, two new churches were established to service the region, Saint George in Bellflower, and Archangel Michael in Santa Ana. Following a second visit in 1989, Pope Shenouda III began to visit California annually, establishing more churches, and ordaining more priests.

By 1995, Southern California had 15 churches, and 19 Priests. During that year's Visit, Pope Shenouda III announced that the region had grown enough to warrant the establishment of a local Bishopric.

=== Diocese ===
In 1995, the congregation of the region signed a petition to instate Bishop Serapion, at that time a general bishop who had assisted the Pope during his visits to them, to be their diocesan bishop. Pope Shenouda III called upon Bishop Serapion to be the bishop of Los Angeles, Southern California and Hawaii on November 14, 1995 in the Coptic Patriarchate in Cairo. Bishop Serapion arrived in Los Angeles on December 23, 1995, and was installed upon the throne by six bishops, in the presence of numerous priests, hundreds of deacons, and a multitude of the congregation.

On June 20, 2013, Pope Tawadros II decreed that the Archangels Michael and Gabriel Coptic Orthodox Church, in Fresno, would be incorporated into the diocese.

On February 28, 2016, Pope Tawadros II elevated Bishop Serapion to the episcopal dignity of metropolitan. Pope Tawadros II also called two bishops to assist Metropolitan Serapion in serving, Bishop Abraham, and Bishop Kyrillos.

On February 15, 2019, Bishop Suriel relocated to assist Metropolitan Serapion in the service of the diocese.

== Statistics ==
Statistics of Diocese Growth and Development
Year	Number of Parishes	Deacons	Sisters	Priests			Bishops
Year	Number of Parishes	Deacons	Sisters	Presbyters	Hegumens	Total	Bishops
1970	1	-	-	-	-	1	-
1975	2	-	-	-	-	2	-
1980	3	-	-	-	-	3	-
1985	5	-	-	-	-	5	-
1990	13	-	-	-	-	12	-
1995	15	-	-	-	-	19	1
2000	22	-	-	-	-	26	1
2005	28	-	-	-	-	42	1
2008	31	5	-	34	13	47	1
2010	31	5	2	35	13	48	1
2015	40	12	2	47	12	59	1
2020	43	11	2	38	21	59	4
2021	44	11	2	40	21	61	4
2022	44	12	2	58	21	79	4
2023	44	24	2	66	25	91	4

== Geographic components ==
The diocese encompasses the southernmost counties of the State of California, as well as the entirety of the State of Hawaii. Due to the large size of the diocese, it is administratively divided into five regions, a region for Hawaii, and four regions for Southern California.

A map showing the internal administrative division of the Southern California portion of the Diocese.

=== Hawaii Region ===
Encompasses the entirety of the State of Hawaii.

=== The Eastern Region ===
Encompasses the easternmost parishes of the diocese, which are in:

- Riverside County
- San Bernardino County

=== The Western Region ===
Encompasses the westernmost parishes of the diocese, which are in:

- Los Angeles County

=== The Northern Region ===
Encompasses the northernmost parishes of the diocese, which are in:

- Fresno County
- Inyo County
- Kern County
- Kings County
- San Luis Obispo County
- Santa Barbara County
- Tulare County
- Ventura County

=== The Southern Region ===
Encompasses the southernmost parishes of the diocese, which are in:

- Imperial County
- Orange County
- San Diego County

== Bishops ==
=== Diocesan bishop ===
Metropolitan Serapion, Bishop of Los Angeles, and Metropolitan of Southern California and Hawaii (1995–present)

=== Auxiliary bishops ===
- Bishop Suriel (1997; 2018–2023)
- Bishop Abraham (2016–present)
- Bishop Kyrillos (2016–present)
