= Abraham (Coptic auxiliary bishop for Los Angeles) =

Egyptian bishop

His Grace Bishop Abraham
- Auxiliary Bishop of Diakonia for the Coptic Orthodox Diocese of Los Angeles, Southern California, and Hawaii and Vice Head of the Ecumenical Relations Committee of the Holy Synod of the Coptic Orthodox Church. Member of the Secretariat Committee of the Holy Synod of the Coptic Orthodox Church.
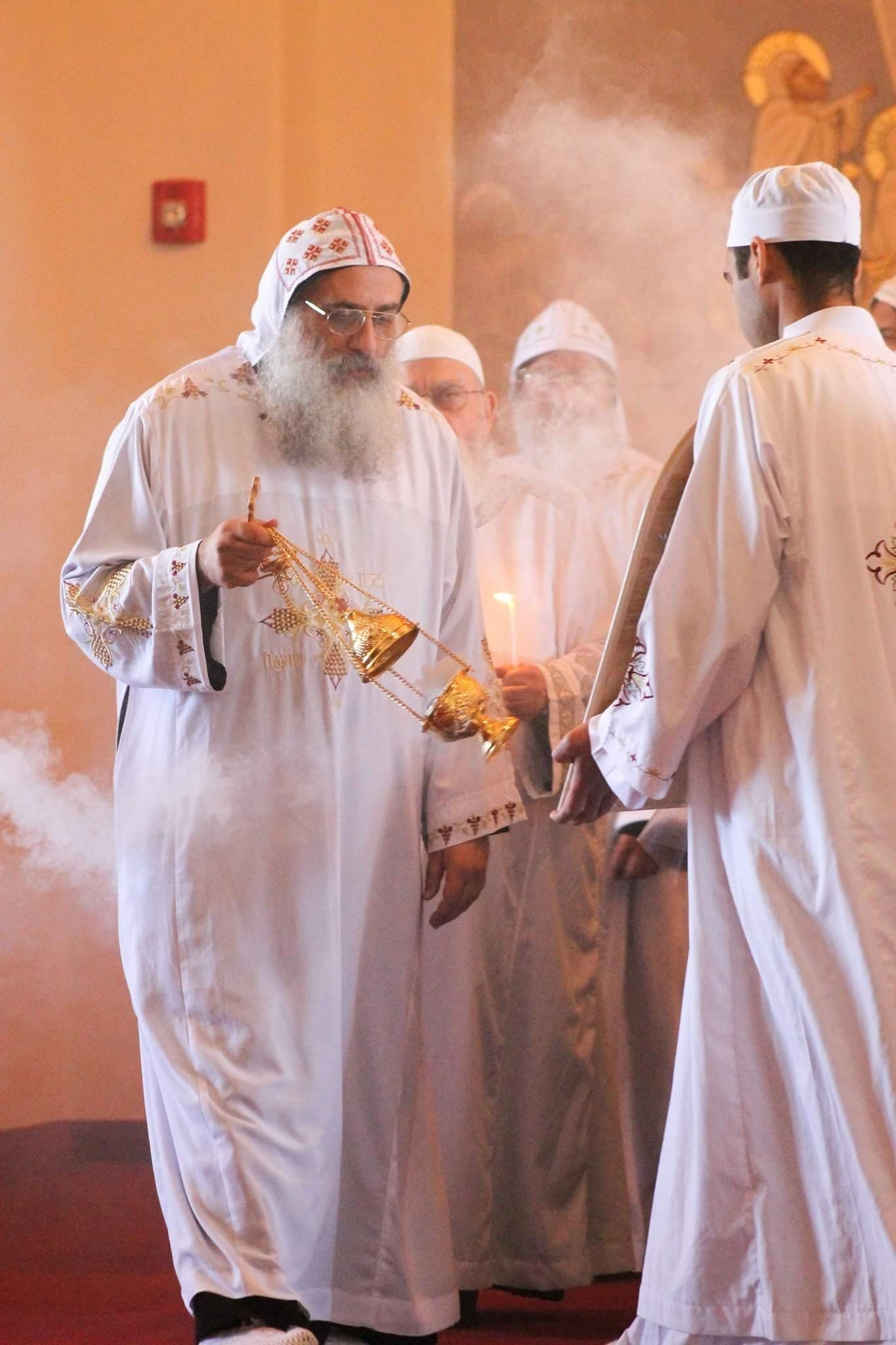
- Bishop Abraham
- Church: Coptic Orthodox Church of Alexandria
- Metropolis: Coptic Orthodox Diocese of Los Angeles, Southern California, and Hawaii

Orders
- Ordination: 31 May 2001 by Pope Shenouda III and Metropolitan Serapion
- Consecration: 12 June 2016 by Pope Tawadros II
- Rank: General Bishop

Personal details
- Born: October 11, 1965 (age 61)
- Denomination: Coptic Orthodox Christian
- Education: Ain Shams University

Bishop Abraham (Arabic: نيافة الأنبا أبراهام) (formerly Fr. Ishak Azmy Boules) serves as the Auxiliary Bishop of Diakonia (i.e., Social Services) in the Coptic Orthodox Diocese of Los Angeles, Southern California, and Hawaii. He is also the Vice Head of the Ecumenical Relations Committee of the Holy Synod of the Coptic Orthodox Church.

== Early life and service ==
He earned his Bachelor of Arts degree in Commerce and Accounting in 1987, from Ain Shams University, in Cairo. Following his graduation, he became a consecrated servant in the Bishopric of Public, Ecumenical, and Social Services in February 1988. During this time, he also served in the Church of St. Mary in Masarra, Shoubra, Cairo. In 1997, he was ordained a consecrated deacon.

== St. Paul Abbey ==
On May 31, 2001, Pope Shenouda III and Bishop Serapion ordained him a celibate priest with the name Fr. Ishak Paul, to serve in the St. Paul Brotherhood (now known as Saint Paul Monastery), in Los Angeles California. He was the first consecrated priest to be ordained for the St. Paul Brotherhood service.

On March 14, 2016, he was elevated to the dignity of Hegumen, by Metropolitan Serapion. On May 8, 2016, he was tonsured a monk by Bishop Sarabamon at the Monastery of Abba Antony in Yermo, California.

== Episcopate ==
On June 12, 2016, Pope Tawadros II consecrated him as an auxiliary bishop with the name Bishop Abraham, to assist Metropolitan Serapion and serve in the Diocese of Los Angeles, Southern California and Hawaii.

On June 18, 2025, Pope Tawadros II appointed Bishop Abraham as a member of the Secretariat Committee of the Holy Synod.

== See also ==
- Metropolitan Serapion
- Bishop Suriel
- Bishop Kyrillos
