= Bishop Kyrillos =

American Coptic Orthodox church Bishop

His Grace Bishop Kyrillos
- Auxiliary Bishop of Christian Education for the Coptic Orthodox Diocese of Los Angeles, Southern California, and Hawaii and Dean of the St. Athanasius and St. Cyril Theological School
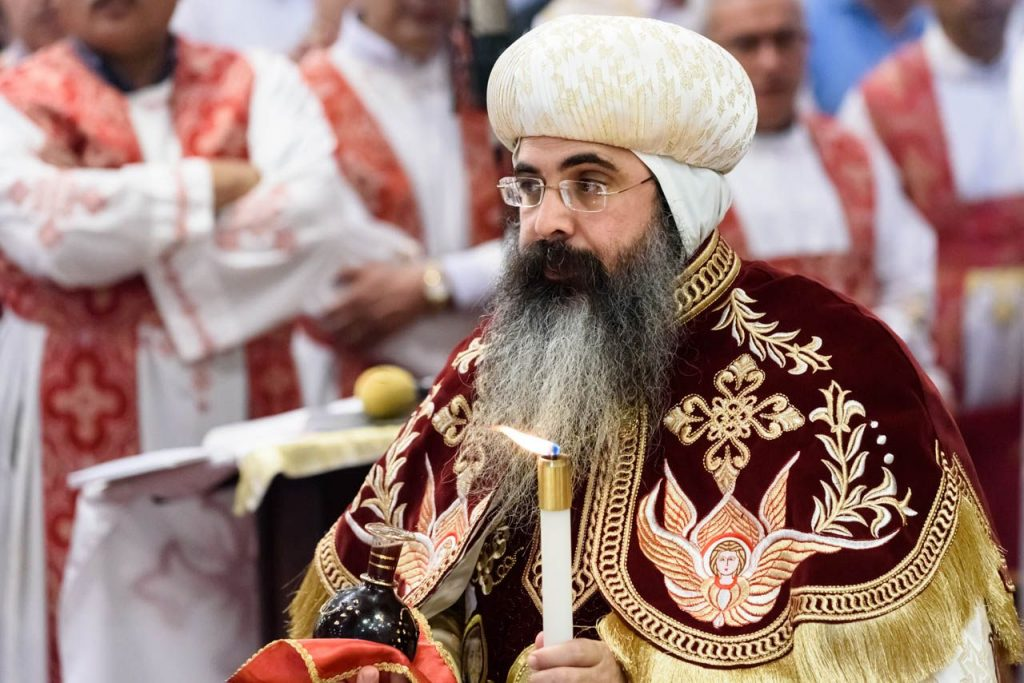
- HG Bishop Kyrillos
- Church: Coptic Orthodox Church
- Metropolis: Coptic Orthodox Diocese of Los Angeles, Southern California, and Hawaii

Orders
- Ordination: 20 October 2002 by Bishop Serapion
- Consecration: 12 June 2016 by Pope Tawadros II
- Rank: General Bishop

Personal details
- Born: Los Angeles, California
- Denomination: Coptic Orthodox Christian
- Education: Georgetown Law

HG Bishop Kyrillos (Arabic نيافة الأنبا كيرلس ) is the first American-born bishop of the Coptic Orthodox Church. He serves as General Bishop of Christian Education for the Coptic Orthodox Diocese of Los Angeles, Southern California, and Hawaii. He is also the Dean of St. Athanasius and St. Cyril Theological School in Anaheim, California. He also serves as the Head of the Sub-Committee for Ecumenical Dialogue (Discussion with other Churches) within the Holy Synod of the Coptic Orthodox Church.

== Early life and education ==
HG Bishop Kyrillos, was born in Los Angeles, California. He obtained a Bachelor of Science in communication studies from UCLA. While at UCLA, he and his twin brother, Fr. David Abdelsayed, spearheaded the first formal Coptic Clubs in Southern California in 1993. After his graduation from UCLA, he obtained a Juris Doctor degree from the Georgetown University Law Center. He practised law before serving as a consecrated deacon from 2000 to 2002.

== St. Paul Brotherhood ==
On October 20, 2002, he was ordained as a celibate priest by HE Metropolitan Serapion, then Bishop Serapion, for St. Paul Brotherhood, joining Fr. Isaac Paul (now Bishop Abraham) as the second member of the order. While serving in this capacity, he also earned two master's degrees in Theology from Holy Cross Orthodox School of Theology in Boston, and a Ph.D. in History of Christianity from the University of Notre Dame, School of Theology in Indiana. He also served at St. Mina Coptic Orthodox Church in Riverside for several years and was involved in ecumenical dialogue with several other denominations. During this time, he published many books and worked to establish a theology school as well as a central education department for the diocese.

== Department of Christian Education ==
Metropolitan Serapion and Bishop Kyrillos established the Department of Christian Education, with a core Sunday School Curriculum, Diaconate Program, Servants Preparation Program, and a special program for children 8–13 on advanced subjects such as Church History, Theology, and Apologetics.

Bishop Kyrillos currently serves as Dean of St. Athanasius and St. Cyril Coptic Orthodox Theological School (ACTS).

== Episcopate ==
Following the elevation of Metropolitan Serapion, Fr. Isaac Paul and Fr. John Paul were chosen to be consecrated as auxiliary bishops, HG Bishop Abraham and HG Bishop Kyrillos, for the Metropolis of Los Angeles. In preparation for this, Metropolitan Serapion elevated them to the priestly dignity of Hegumen on March 14, 2016. On Thomas Sunday, May 8, 2016, they were tonsured as monks by Bishop Sarabamon at the monastery of Abba Antony in Yermo, California. They were consecrated as general bishops to aid Metropolitan Serapion on Sunday, June 12, 2016 at the Cathedral of the Holy Virgin Mary in Zeitoun, Egypt by Pope Tawadros II.

== See also ==
- Coptic Orthodox Church in the United States
- Coptic Orthodox Diocese of Los Angeles, Southern California, and Hawaii
