= Serapion (Coptic bishop of Los Angeles) =

Coptic bishop

His Eminence Metropolitan Serapion
- Bishop of Los Angeles and Metropolitan of Southern California and Hawaii
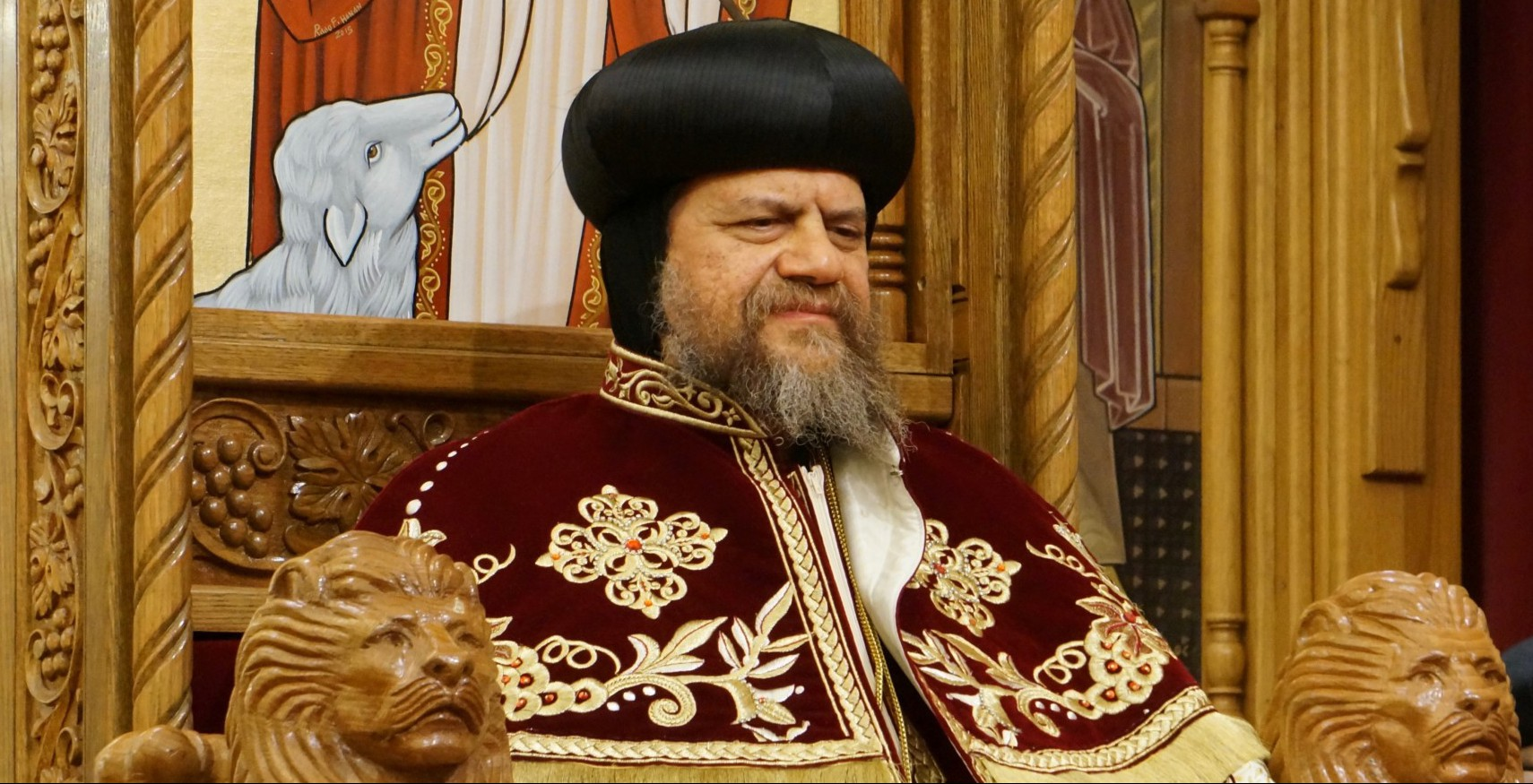
- Metropolitan Serapion
- Native name: نيافة الأنبا سرابيون
- Church: Coptic Orthodox Church of Alexandria
- Metropolis: Coptic Orthodox Diocese of Los Angeles, Southern California, and Hawaii
- Installed: 23 December 1995

Orders
- Ordination: 18 July 1981
- Consecration: 2 June 1985
- Rank: Metropolitan of Southern California and Hawaii

Personal details
- Born: Assiut, Kingdom of Egypt
- Denomination: Coptic Orthodox Christian
- Education: Faculty of Medicine at Assiut

HE Metropolitan Serapion (Arabic: نيافة الأنبا سرابيون) is the first hierarch and bishop of the Coptic Orthodox Diocese of Los Angeles, Southern California, and Hawaii. He was born in Assiut, Kingdom of Egypt. Following his graduation from the Faculty of Medicine at Assiut in 1975, he practiced medicine in Aswan before becoming a monk.

== Monastic life ==
He joined the Monastery of Saint Pishoy on April 8, 1979.

He was tonsured a monk on August 6, 1979, and ordained a priest on July 18, 1981, at El-Sourian Monastery. On December 23, 1982, he was assigned to serve the Coptic congregations in Zurich, Lausanne, and Geneva, Switzerland.

== Bishopric of Public, Ecumenical, and Social Services ==
On June 2, 1985, he was ordained Bishop for the Bishopric of Public, Ecumenical, and Social Services at St. Mark Cathedral in Cairo, becoming a member of The Holy Synod of the Coptic Orthodox Patriarchate of Alexandria. During his tenure in this capacity, he established three major departments designed for

- the growth and development of services,
- serving the family, and
- international relationship with other churches.

Training centers were created to educate and train 300 workers every year in various trades, which helped in improving their standard of living. Numerous projects were started which employed a large number of those workers. Services extended to Coptic families in rural areas and small villages where spiritual guidance, medical services, housing, and financial assistance were offered.

Bishop Serapion has represented the Coptic Orthodox Church at the International Council of Churches and has established long-term relationships with other churches in the United States, Canada, and Italy. He was the first Coptic bishop invited to attend the annual conference of the Church of Scotland.

== Bishop of Los Angeles ==
On November 14, 1995, at Saint Mark's Cathedral at Anba Rowiss, Abbassia, Egypt, Pope Shenouda III consecrated Serapion to be Bishop of the Diocese of Los Angeles, Southern California, and Hawaii.

On December 23, 1995, he was enthroned by Bishops Sarabamon, Hedra, Roweiss, Mittaous, Youssef, and Karas as Bishop of the Diocese of Los Angeles, Southern California, and Hawaii at Holy Virgin Mary Church in Los Angeles.

== Visit to the Vatican ==
On Wednesday, May 8, 2013, Bishop Serapion traveled to the Vatican to join a delegation of Coptic Orthodox bishops accompanying Pope Tawadros II in a historic visit to meet Pope Francis of the Roman Catholic Church.

Pope Tawadros' visit marks the first official visit by the Pope of Alexandria to the Pope of Rome in over 40 years, since Pope Shenouda III met with Pope Paul VI in 1973 and began ecumenical dialogue. This was also Tawadros's first trip outside of Egypt since his election to the papacy in November 2012.

== Elevation to Metropolitan ==
On February 28, 2016, at Anba Roweiss, Abbassia, Egypt, Pope Tawadros II elevated Bishop Serapion to the episcopal dignity of Metropolitan. Pope Tawadros II also called bishops Abraham and Kyrillos to assist Metropolitan Serapion.

On February 15, 2019, Bishop Suriel also relocated to assist Metropolitan Serapion in the service of the Diocese.

== See also ==
- Coptic Orthodox Church in the United States
- Coptic Orthodox Diocese of Los Angeles, Southern California, and Hawaii
- Holy Synod of the Coptic Orthodox Church
