= Coptic Orthodox Diocese of the Southern United States =

Location
- Country: USA
- Jurisdiction: Alabama, Arizona, Arkansas, Florida, Georgia, Louisiana, Mississippi, New Mexico, Oklahoma, Tennessee, Texas
- Subdivisions: Western Region, Central Region, Florida Region

Leadership
- Pope: Tawadros II
- Metropolitan: Youssef
- Auxilary Bishops: Bishop Basil; Bishop Gregory

History
- Established: 1993

Information
- Denomination: Oriental Orthodox
- Church: Coptic Orthodox Church
- Rite: Alexandrian Rite
- Calendar: Coptic Calendar
- Languages: Coptic , Arabic , English

Statistics
- Parishes: 38
- Churches: 64
- Schools: 1
- Priests: 88

Website
- https://www.suscopts.org/

The Coptic Orthodox Diocese of the Southern United States is a diocese of the Coptic Orthodox Church of Alexandria located in the United States of America and encompassing the states of Alabama,

Arizona, Arkansas, Florida, Georgia, Louisiana, Mississippi, New Mexico, Oklahoma, Tennessee and Texas.

== History ==
The Coptic Orthodox Diocese of the Southern United States was established in 1993 by Pope Shenouda III of Alexandria in response to the growing number of Coptic Orthodox Churches abroad, especially concentrated in the South. It was the first Coptic Orthodox Diocese to be established in the United States.

== Statistics ==
Year	Membership	Priests			Parishes		
Year	Membership	Hegumen	Presbyters	Total	Churches	Communities	Total
1993		0	5	5	6*	-	6*
1994		0	6	6	6*	-	6*
1995		0	7	7	6*	-	6*
1996		0	8	8	7*	-	7*
1997		1	10	11	7*	-	7*
1998		1	11	12	7*	-	7*
1999		1	13	14	7*	-	7*
2000		2	15	17	7*	-	7*
2001		3	17	20	7*	-	7*
2002		3	19	22	7*	-	7*
2003		3	20	23	7*	-	7*
2004		3	20	23	7*	1*	8*
2005		6	20	26	9*	1*	10*
2006		6	21	27	9*	1*	10*
2007		9	22	31	10*	1*	11*
2008		9	24	33	10*	1*	11*
2009		9	26	35	12*	1*	13*
2010		10	29	39	12*	1*	13*
2011		10	28	38	16*	1*	17*
2012		10	36	46	18*	4*	22*
2013		9	38	47	19*	4*	23*
2014		9	38	47	19*	4*	23*
2015		9	40	49	38	28	64
*Number of confirmed churches; actual number of churches in any given year could have and probably was much larger.

== Parishes and schools ==
As of 2023, the Diocese of the Southern United States operates 64 parishes. However, only 38 of these of formal churches, the other 26 are categorized as communities, which means that they are congregations, and usually possess a church building, but are not full churches yet in that they are not large enough by diocesan standards to be recognized as churches. Communities are served by a visiting priest from a recognized church.

=== Schools ===
The diocese currently operates one school, and religious education is provided to children in the form of Sunday School classes at local Coptic churches.

== Publications ==
The Diocese of the Southern United States publishes three magazines: Mighty Angels, Mighty Arrows, and Mighty Champions.

== Bishops ==
- Metropolitan Youssef (1993–present)
- Bishop Basil (2018–present)
- Bishop Gregory (2018–present)
