= Bishop Karas =

Sudanese-American bishop

- Church: Coptic Orthodox Church

Personal details
- Born: Sorial Ayad Sorial; 17 January 1955 Sudan
- Died: 17 January 2002 (aged 47) California, United States
- Occupation: Bishop
- Education: University of Khartoum

Bishop Karas (born Sorial Ayad Sorial) was the first bishop of the Coptic Orthodox Church in the United States and the first abbot of the church's first monastery outside Egypt.

== Early life ==
Sorial Ayad Sorial was born on 17 January 1955, in Sudan. Sorial was devout at a young age, and received a strong Orthodox upbringing. After Sorial finished his bachelor's degree in chemical engineering from the University of Khartoum, he left to France to pursue a doctorate at the University of Toulouse.

== Career ==
On 18 January 1981, he attempted to enter Monastery of Saint Bishoy but was stopped by the Abbot, Bishop Sarabamoun, who told him to return to France to continue his education. Sorial replied, “No one, having put his hand on the plough can look back.” (Luke 9:62) The Abbot then allowed him to enter. On November 14, 1981, Sorial was ordained a monk and given the name Father Karas. Pope Shenouda III ordained him as a priest on 14 February 1984, and assigned him to head the Papal Center in St. Bishoy Monastery. On 23 May 1989 Pope Shenouda elevated Father Karas to Hegumen.

Hegumen Karas was appointed to head the new Monastery of St. Antony the Great in Newberry Springs, California (near Barstow, California) on 26 September 1989.

The Bishops and Metropolitans of the Holy Synod of the Coptic Orthodox Church unanimously agreed to the elevation of Father Karas as Bishop and Abbot in recognition of the monastery's prosperity; he was consecrated as a bishop on 6 July 1991, by Pope Shenouda III.

In 1998 Bishop Karas was diagnosed with lung cancer and was given nine months to live. The bishop continued to celebrate the Divine Liturgy, followed the regular fast schedule and lived a strict ascetic life. He met daily with visitors, even though he was receiving chemotherapy treatment. On 10 January 2002, Bishop Karas suffered a stroke and fell into a coma; he died in the early morning of January 17, the day before his 47th birthday.
