= Sarabamon (Coptic bishop of Saint Pishoy Monastery) =

Coptic bishop of Saint Pishoy Monastery (1937–2020)

His Grace Sarabamon
- Bishop and Abbot of the Monastery of Saint Pishoy
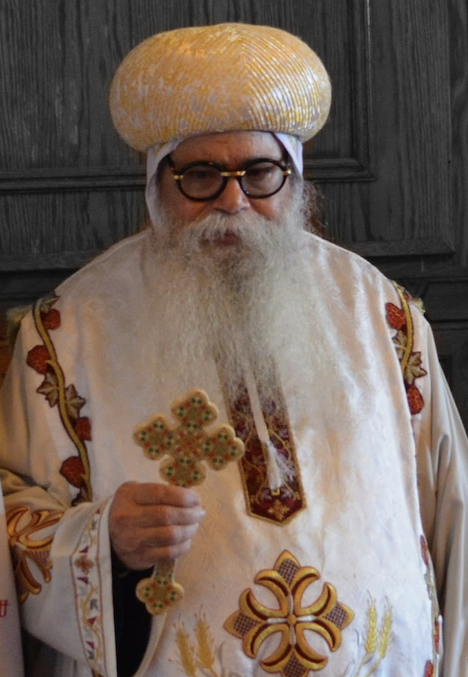
- Bishop Sarabamon
- Native name: Ⲁⲃⲃⲁ Ⲥⲉⲣⲁⲡⲁⲙⲟⲛ; الأنبا صرابامون
- Church: Coptic Orthodox Church
- Diocese: Monastery of Saint Pishoy, Scetes, Egypt
- Installed: 29 May 1977
- Term ended: 8 March 2020

Orders
- Ordination: 24 February 1963 (Presbyter)
- Consecration: 17 June 1973 (Bishop)

Personal details
- Born: Azer Qalid Bastarous عازر قليد بسطاورس; 20 February 1937 Armant, Luxor, Kingdom of Egypt
- Died: 8 March 2020 (aged 83)
- Buried: Monastery of Saint Pishoy, Scetes, Egypt
- Denomination: Coptic Orthodox Christian
- Residence: Coptic Orthodox Patriarchal Residence

Bishop Sarabamon or Serapamon (Arabic: نيافة الأنبا صرابامون, Coptic: Ⲁⲃⲃⲁ Ⲥⲉⲣⲁⲡⲁⲙⲟⲛ) was the Bishop and Abbot of the Monastery of Saint Pishoy in Wadi El Natrun, Beheira Governorate, Egypt from 1977 until his death on 8 March 2020.

== Early life ==
He was born Azer Qalid Bastarous (Arabic: عازر قليد بسطاورس) in Armant, Luxor, Kingdom of Egypt, on February 20, 1937. He joined the Monastery of the Virgin Mary of the Syrians, and was tonsured as a monk on Tuesday, December 8, 1959. He chose the name Sarabamon (arabized version of Serapamon) as the date of his consecration corresponded to the 28th of Hathor, which was the feast day of the Martyrdom of Saint Serapamon the Bishop of Nikiou.

On Sunday, February 24, 1963, he was ordained a Presbyter. He was later elevated to the dignity of Hegumen on Sunday, June 25, 1967, and was designated as the monastery's confessor.

== Episcopate ==
On Sunday, June 17, 1973, corresponding to the Feast of Pentecost, he was consecrated a General Bishop by the hands of Pope Shenouda III. Later, on Sunday, May 29, 1977, he was enthroned as Bishop and Abbot of the Monastery of Saint Pishoy.

On Wednesday, January 31, 1996, he was granted the Great Schema, in recognition of his completion of over 30 years of monastic piety, and service. The Monastery also held a celebration commemorating his 60th year of monasticism on December 2, 2019.

During his episcopate, he was a member of the Holy Synod's Monasteries and Monastic Affairs Committee, Rites Committee, and Diocesan Affairs Committee. He was also responsible for overseeing the construction of new monasteries in Europe and North America.

He received the Order of the Two Niles from Sudan.

== Death ==
On Sunday, March 8, 2020, Bishop Sarabamon died after a four-day hospitalization. Funerary rites were prayed on Tuesday, March 10, 2020, and he was laid to rest in a tomb adjacent to the Pope Shenouda III Memorial in the Monastery of Saint Pishoy.

== See also ==
- Metropolitan Serapion
