= Bishoy Kamel =

20th-century Egyptian Coptic priest

Saint Bishoy Kamel Ⲡⲓⲁⲅⲓⲟⲥ Ⲡⲓϣⲱⲓ Ⲕⲁⲙⲉⲗ
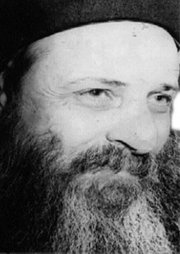

Hegumen
- Born: December 6, 1931; Sers el-Lyan, Monufia, Egypt
- Died: March 21, 1979 (aged 47); Alexandria, Egypt
- Venerated in: Coptic Orthodox Church Ethiopian Orthodox Tewahido Church
- Major shrine: St. George Coptic Orthodox Church (Sporting, Alexandria, Egypt)

Bishoy Kamel also spelled Bishoi Kamel (Coptic: Ⲡⲓϣⲱⲓ Ⲕⲁⲙⲉⲗ; 1931–1979), was a priest of the Coptic Orthodox Church of Alexandria.

== Life ==
He was born Samy Kamel in 1931 in Sers el-Lyan, Monufia Governorate, Egypt, later moving to Damenhour where he received his early education. He went on to attend Alexandria University, and received his Bachelor of Science degree there in 1951. He started as a teacher in a local school, at the same time continuing his own studies. In 1954, he received an advanced degree in literature and was appointed as an instructor at the Alexandria University college of education.

In 1959, he took some of his students to receive blessings from the new patriarch, Pope Cyril VI. The Pope unexpectedly handpicked Samy to become the priest of a new church being built in Sporting, Alexandria. Despite never having met him before, the Pope made the sign of the cross on the young man's head and said, “God has given us a sign that you are to be a priest. I shall ordain you next Sunday.” After a swiftly arranged marriage, he was ordained the next week.

While a priest, he also taught Sunday school and offered free tutoring for children who needed it. He is also noted for going around to the needy of his congregation after evening services on Christmas, Epiphany, and Easter, because he thought it important to share with his congregation the meaning of the church's "feasts".

Fr. Bishoy founded the St. George Coptic Orthodox Church in Sporting, Alexandria, Egypt. As the church grew, he became convinced one priest would not be enough and sought to have associate priests at the church. Although he was initially advised against doing so, he persisted, and in time the church had five priests working there, all of whom remained overworked as well. Other churches he founded in Alexandria include St. George in Hadara, the Church of Archangel Michael in the Mustafa Kamel area, St. Takla Hemanout in the Ibrahimeya neighborhood, the church of St. Mary and St. Cyril in the Cleopatra neighborhood, and the church of St. Peter in the Sidi Bishr neighborhood.

In 1969, Kamel was sent to minister to the needs of the Coptic faithful in Los Angeles. Initially, the church placed him in a building used by the Syriac Orthodox Church. Later, he was given the chance to buy a building which the Russian Orthodox Church congregation had earlier used on Robertson Boulevard which would cost $100,000. His church at the time had about $500 available. Father Bishoy Kamel managed to raise $23,000, some of which came from newer immigrants to the area.

Fr. Bishoy took a cab to a local bank, where he was prepared to pay the $23,000 and sign a mortgage for the church. Unfortunately, he left the unmarked envelope containing the money in the seat of the taxi he took to the bank. He didn't notice until entering the bank and being asked by the loan officer what had happened to the money. He left the bank and returned to his home near the church they were using without the mortgage or the money, convinced that at least some people would believe that he had himself stolen the money. Later that night, after midnight, he heard a knock on his door and asked his wife to answer it. The driver of the taxi was there. He confessed to having found the money in the cab and drove around for some time trying to decide whether to keep it or not. After deciding not to, determining that his fare had been some sort of minister, he had to find a way to locate him. He asked around, and finally managed to determine who his fare must have been, and arrived with the money.

== Final years and legacy ==
Fr. Bishoy would later help establish Coptic churches in Jersey City, NJ such as St. George and St. Shenouda. Also, Denver and Houston, and areas of Europe and Australia. Although very interested in the spiritual welfare of others, Fr. Bishoy was also very concerned with what he felt was his own salvation. He displayed an unusual degree of humility. Although married for several years to his wife, Angel, both of them remained celibate. As a preacher, he regularly cited examples from the Bible, Church history, tradition, and the life of the Saints. His voice is described as having been low, almost weak, but was very appreciated by his congregation. He wrote religious books, including Under the Feet of the Cross and With Christ Crucified. He died in 1979 and is buried in Alexandria.

In 1976 he was diagnosed with cancer, and after three years of struggling with the illness, he departed peacefully on March 21, 1979. His fellow priest Fr Tadros Malaty recalls that the days of his illness, even when he was on his sickbed, were some of the most effective in his entire service, even though Fr Bishoy himself did not perceive it: “God had hidden from [Fr Bishoy’s] eyes the power of his service during his sickness. Many people found comfort in their sickness or by troubles merely seeing [him] in pain or hearing about his patience and joy!”
