= Pope Tawadros II of Alexandria =

Head of the Coptic Church since 2012

His Holiness Pope Tawadros II
- Pope of Alexandria & Patriarch of the See of St. Mark
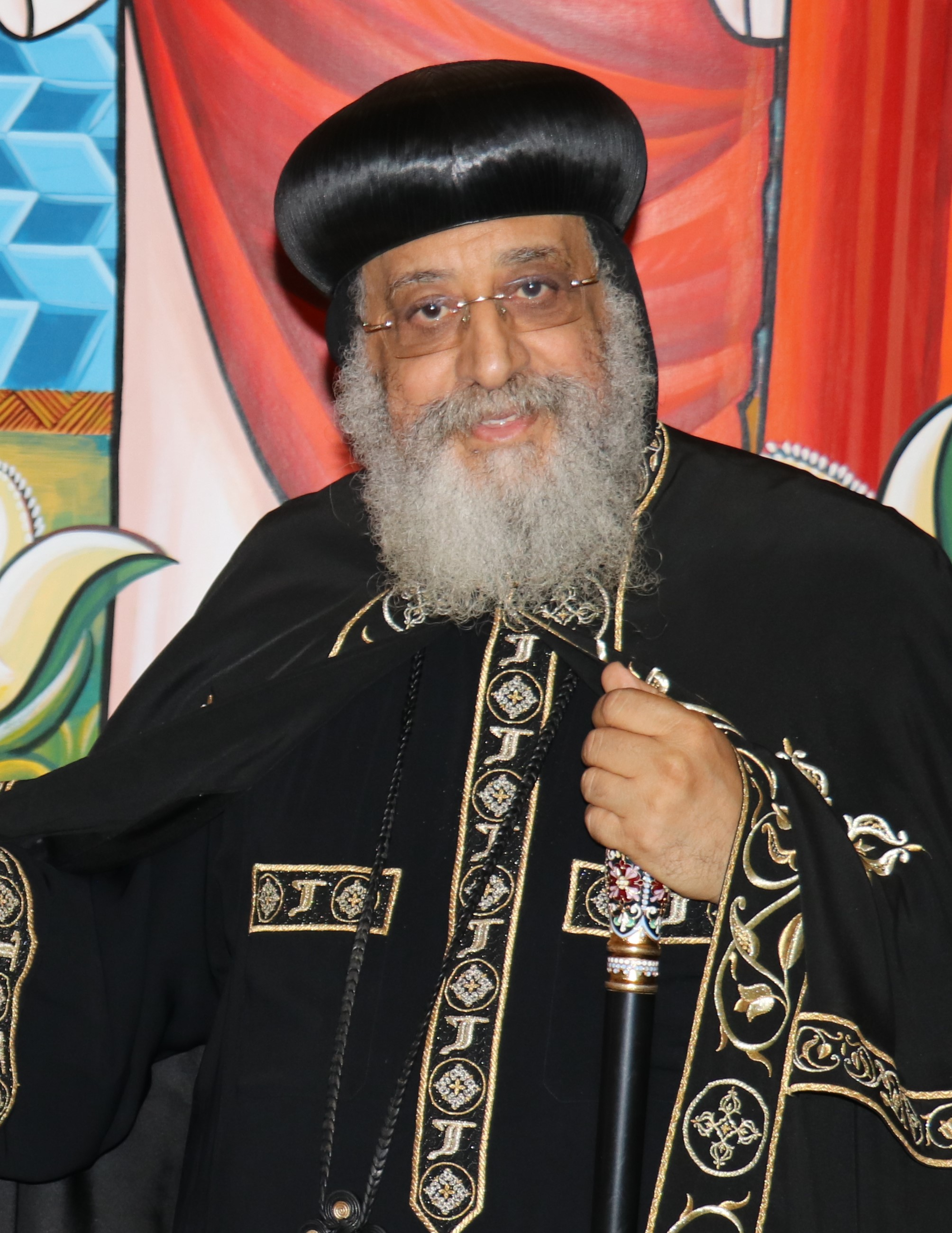
- Tawadros II in 2019
- Native name: Ⲡⲁⲡⲁ Ⲁⲃⲃⲁ Ⲑⲉⲟ́ⲇⲱⲣⲟⲥ ⲡⲓⲙⲁϩ ⲃ̅ Arabic: البابا تواضروس الثانى
- Church: Coptic Orthodox Church of Alexandria
- Archdiocese: Alexandria and all of Africa
- Province: Alexandria
- Diocese: Alexandria
- See: Alexandria
- Papacy began: 18 November 2012 (9 Hathor 1729)
- Predecessor: Shenouda III

Orders
- Ordination: 1989 (1705–1706)
- Consecration: 15 June 1997 (8 Paoni 1713) by Pope Shenouda III of Alexandria

Personal details
- Born: Wagih Sobhi Baqi Suleiman; 4 November 1952 (age 74) Mansoura, Kingdom of Egypt
- Denomination: Coptic Orthodox Christian
- Residence: Coptic Orthodox Patriarchal Residence
- Education: Pharmacist
- Alma mater: Alexandria University

Pope Tawadros II (Note: Coptic: Ⲡⲁⲡⲁ Ⲁⲃⲃⲁ Ⲑⲉⲟ́ⲇⲱⲣⲟⲥ ⲡⲓⲙⲁϩ ⲃ̅', romanized: Papa Abba Theódōros II ; Arabic: البابا تواضروس الثانى) (born Wagih Sobhi Baqi Suleiman; (Note: Arabic: وجيه صبحى باقى سليمان [waˈɡiːh ˈsˤobħi ˈbæːʔi seleˈmæːn]) 4 November 1952) is the 118th and current Pope of Alexandria and Patriarch of the See of St. Mark, succeeding the late Pope Shenouda III as leader of the Coptic Orthodox Church of Alexandria. He took office on 18 November 2012 (Coptic calendar: 9 Hathor 1729), two weeks after being selected.

== Early life ==
Wagih Sobhi Baqi Suleiman was born on 4 November 1952 in Damanhur, Kingdom of Egypt. He studied at the Alexandria University, where he received a degree in pharmacy in 1975. After a few years of managing a state-owned pharmaceutical factory, he joined the Monastery of Saint Pishoy in Wadi El Natrun to study theology for two years. In 1988, he was formally tonsured a monk by Pope Shenouda III and given the name "Theodore Anba-Bishoy." He was ordained a priest in 1989 (1705–1706).

== Bishop ==
On 15 June 1997 (8 Paoni 1713), he was consecrated as a general bishop by his predecessor pope Shenouda III, with the Arabized Greco-Coptic name Tawadros (Arabic: تواضروس; Coptic: Ⲑⲉⲟ́ⲇⲱⲣⲟⲥ, late Coptic: [tæˈ(w)odo(ː)ros]), the equivalent of Greek Theódōros (Θεόδωρος), Amharic: ታዋድሮስ, and English Theodore. He was assigned to serve in the Eparchy of Behira in the northwestern Delta as an auxiliary to Metropolitan Pachomius.

== Papal selection ==
The papal selection process began several weeks before the 18 November/9 Hathor selection. About 2,400 clergymen and others shortlisted three candidates: Bishop Tawadros, former aide to Metropolitan Pachomios; Bishop Raphael, General Bishop in Downtown Cairo; and Father Raphael Ava Mina, a monk in a monastery near Alexandria and disciple of the 116th pope, Cyril VI.

The ceremony to choose the pope from the three consensus candidates was held at Cairo's St. Mark's Cathedral at about noon, with a marked police presence. Metropolitan Pachomios, locum tenens of the Church, put slips bearing the candidates' names in a sealed chalice which was set upon the altar, then led the Divine Liturgy. He told the congregation to "pray that God will choose the good shepherd", and a blindfolded boy took a slip—Tawadros—from the chalice.

Metropolitan Pachomius formally announced that the sixty-year-old Bishop Tawadros was to be the 118th Pope, and would be Pope Tawadros II, after Pope Tawadros I (r. 730–742), who was consecrated 45th Coptic Patriarch and Pope during Egypt's Umayyad Period (658–750). Tawadros II said, from the monastery at Wadi Natrun, "[We] will start by organising the house from within. It is a responsibility. Most important is ... that the church, as an institution, serves the community". Bishop Raphael, who came first in the election stage of papal selection, was appointed general secretary of the Holy Synod of the Coptic Orthodox Church.

== Papacy ==
Ordination history of Pope Tawadros II of Alexandria
History
Episcopal consecration
- Consecrated by: Pope Shenouda III of Alexandria

Pope Tawadros II started his papacy amid multiple changes in Egypt, saying that the Orthodox Church is committed to keeping Article 2 of Egypt's draft constitution intact, as it was in the old constitution.

On Palm Sunday in 2017, Pope Tawadros II celebrated the Divine Liturgy mass at the Cathedral of St. Mark in Alexandria just before the cathedral was bombed, killing at least 17 people and injuring at least 48. The pope escaped unharmed. ISIS took responsibility for the attack.

== Views ==
Pope Tawadros II has stated that the 2011 Egyptian revolution was a turning point in the Coptic Church's relations with its youth. Amongst his first tasks is the issue of Egypt's changing political landscape, given the new constitution and more independent-minded congregants who seek their demands outside the church in dealing with the state.

In a short televised speech in July 2013 (Paoni 1729), Pope Tawadros II supported the removal of Egyptian president Mohamed Morsi and institution of a transitional government dominated by the president of the Supreme Constitutional Court of Egypt, Adly Mansour who acted as a temporary president at the time.

Since the beginning of the Gaza war in 2023, Tawadros II has condemned Israeli actions in the Gaza Strip.

== Travels ==
On 8 May 2013 (30 Parmouti 1729), Pope Tawadros II met with Pope Francis of the Roman Catholic Church, in Vatican City. This was the first meeting of the two recently elected church leaders and only the second gathering of popes in Italy in 1,500 years. The last visit of a Coptic pope to the Vatican occurred on 10 May 1973 (2 Pashons 1689) when then-Pope Shenouda III met with then-Pope Paul VI where they signed an important Christological declaration with the ambition to initiate ecumenical dialogue between the two ancient churches.

On 10 May (2 Pashons), Pope Tawadros II and Pope Francis held a shared prayer followed by a reception with the Pontifical Council for Promoting Christian Unity and other dicasteries of the Roman Curia. Pope Tawadros II also visited the tombs of the Apostle Peter and the Apostle Paul. Additionally, Pope Tawadros II visited Copts in Rome.

On 27 November 2015 (17 Hathor 1732), Pope Tawadros II made the first Coptic papal visit to Jerusalem since 1832 (1548–1549), especially controversial as Pope Shenouda III had boycotted Jerusalem for four decades over the Arab–Israeli conflict. The purpose of the visit was the funeral of Archbishop Anba Abraham, rather than to formally end the boycott.

On 4 September 2016 (29 Mesori 1732), Pope Tawadros II visited King Abdullah of Jordan at the Royal Palace in Amman, his first visit to Jordan, before attending the general assembly of the Middle East Council of Churches on 6–8 September (1–3 Pi Kogi Enavot). The pope also visited Mount Nebo and the baptism site of John the Baptist, and praised King Abdullah and Jordan for encouraging religious tolerance and protecting holy sites.

In 2017, Pope Tawadros visited the United Kingdom and Ireland.

In September 2017, Pope Tawadros II visited Sydney, Australia for the first time as Pope. On 10 September 2017 (8 Mesori 1733), Pope Tawadros II visited Melbourne to officially open Eporo Tower in the diocese of Melbourne and Affiliated Regions.

On 10-13 May 2026 he was in official visit to Croatia, where he led worship in Zagreb at the "Day of Coptic-Catholic friendship" and had reception at the foreign affairs minister Gordan Grlić Radman, prime minister Andrej Plenković and speaker of the parliament Gordan Jandroković, as well as with president Zoran Milanović. He also met with Croatian Catholic prelates archbishop Dražen Kutleša, bishop Vjekoslav Huzjak and others.

== Saints ==
On 21 February 2015 (Meshir 14, 1731), Pope Tawadros II announced that 20 Copts and one Ghanaian murdered by the Islamic State in Libya would be commemorated as martyr saints on the 8th of Meshir of the Coptic calendar (15 February of the Gregorian calendar). The commemoration falls on the feast day of the Presentation of Jesus at the Temple.

== Episcopal genealogy ==
Pope Tawadros II of Alexandria, ordained bishop on 15 June 1997 by:

- Pope Shenouda III of Alexandria, ordained bishop on 30 September 1962 by:
- Pope Cyril VI of Alexandria, ordained bishop on 10 May 1959 by:
- Bishop Athanasious, Metropolitan of Bany Sweif, ordained bishop in 1925 by:
- Pope Cyril V of Alexandria, ordained bishop on 1 November 1874 by:
- Bishop Isak, Bishop of Bahnasa, Fayoum and El-Giza, ordained bishop before 1842 by:
- Pope Peter VII of Alexandria, ordained bishop in 1809 by:
- Pope Mark VIII of Alexandria, ordained bishop on 2 October 1796 by:
- Bishop Boutrous, Metropolitan of Gerga and Akhmim, ordained in 1751 by:
- Pope Mark VII of Alexandria, ordained on 30 May 1745 by:
- Bishop Athanasius, Bishop of Jerusalem, ordained in 1720 by:
- Pope Peter VI of Alexandria, ordained bishop on 21 August 1718 by:
- Bishop Khristotholos, Metropolitan of Ethiopia, ordained bishop in 1665 by:
- Pope Matthew IV of Alexandria, ordained bishop on 6 December 1660

== Notes ==
Oriental Orthodox titles
Preceded by Shenouda III	Coptic Pope; 2012–present	Incumbent
