= Pope Gabriel =

Pope Gabriel may refer to:

- Pope Gabriel I of Alexandria, ruled in 910–920/1
- Pope Gabriel II of Alexandria, ruled in 1131–1145
- Pope Gabriel III of Alexandria, ruled in 1268–1271
- Pope Gabriel IV of Alexandria, ruled in 1370–1378
- Pope Gabriel V of Alexandria, ruled in 1408–1427
- Pope Gabriel VI of Alexandria, ruled in 1466–1475
- Pope Gabriel VII of Alexandria, ruled in 1525–1570
- Pope Gabriel VIII of Alexandria, ruled in 1587–1603
