= Pope John XVIII of Alexandria =

Head of the Coptic Church from 1769 to 1796

Pope John XVIII
- Pope of Alexandria & Patriarch of the See of St. Mark
- Papacy began: 23 October 1769
- Papacy ended: 7 June 1796
- Predecessor: Mark VII
- Successor: Mark VIII

Personal details
- Born: Joseph Fayoum, Egypt
- Died: 7 June 1796 Egypt
- Buried: Saint Mercurius Church in Coptic Cairo
- Denomination: Coptic Orthodox Christian
- Residence: Saint Mary Church (Haret Elroum)

Pope John XVIII of Alexandria (Abba Youannis) was the 107th Pope of Alexandria & Patriarch of the See of St. Mark from 1769 to 1796. Pope John XVIII was born in Fayoum, Egypt. His lay name was Joseph. He became a monk in the Monastery of Saint Anthony. At the departure of Pope Mark VII, he was unanimously chosen to succeed him. He was ordained at the church of Saint Mercurius Church in Coptic Cairo, on Sunday, 15 Paopi, 1486 A.M. (23 October 1769 AD)

The Seat of the Pope during his papacy remained in the Saint Mary Church (Haret Elroum) in Cairo.

== Relations with Rome ==
During his papacy, Pope Pius VI of Rome attempted to attract the Eastern Churches to Roman Catholicism. Thus, he published the proceedings of the Council of Chalcedon and distributed it in all the countries of the East. Pope Pius VI of Rome even sent an envoy to Pope John XVIII of Alexandria asking him to unite with the Roman Catholic Church. The famous scholar and theologian Joseph el-Abbah, Bishop of Girga responded to the message, refuting its claims and defending the Oriental Orthodoxy Position.

== Persecution ==
During the papacy of Pope John XVIII, the Copts were persecuted by the Ottoman rulers. The Jizya was increased to unprecedented amounts of money, and those who could not pay it had to convert to Islam or be executed. The commander of the Ottoman army stationed in Egypt seized the treasury of the Patriarchate and confiscated all its funds. Pope John XVIII had to go into hiding for some time.

== Ibrahim El-Gohary ==
Pope John XVIII was a good friend of the famous Coptic layman Ibrahim El-Gohary. Together, they worked on restoring monasteries and churches. They also prepared the Holy Myron.

Pope John XVIII departed on 2 Paoni, 1512 A.M. (7 June 1796 AD) He remained on the papal Throne of Saint Mark for 26 years, 7 months, and 16 days. He was buried in the tombs of the Patriarchs at Saint Mercurius Church in Coptic Cairo. The papal Throne remained vacant after his departure for 3 months and 26 days.

Oriental Orthodox titles
Preceded by Mark VII	Coptic Pope; 1769–1796	Succeeded by Mark VIII
