= Pope Matthew IV of Alexandria =

Head of the Coptic Church from 1660 to 1675

- Pope of Alexandria & Patriarch of the See of St. Mark
- Papacy began: 6 December 1660 27 Hathor 1376
- Papacy ended: 15 August 1675 8 Mesori 1391
- Predecessor: Mark VI
- Successor: John XVI

Personal details
- Born: George (Guirguis) Meer, Ashmonain District, Diocese of Qousqam (known as El-Muharaq), Egypt
- Died: 15 August 1675 8 Mesori 1391 Egypt
- Buried: Saint Mercurius Church in Coptic Cairo
- Denomination: Coptic Orthodox Christian
- Residence: Saint Mary Church (Haret Elroum)

Pope Matthew IV of Alexandria (Anba Matta El-Meeri), 102nd Pope of Alexandria & Patriarch of the See of St. Mark.

== A monk ==
He was originally from Meer, hence the name Elmeeri, and joined the Paromeos Monastery in the Nitrian Desert before becoming a Pope.

== A Pope ==
On his first day as a Coptic Pope he transferred the Seat of the Coptic Orthodox Pope of Alexandria from Church of the Virgin Mary (Haret Zuweila) to Saint Mary Church (Haret Elroum). and it stayed there till 1800 A.D. (1516–1517 A.M.) when Pope Mark VIII transferred it to Saint Mark's Coptic Orthodox Cathedral (Azbakeya).

Oriental Orthodox titles
Preceded by Mark VI	Coptic Pope; 1660–1675	Succeeded by John XVI
