= Parmouti =

- Native name: Coptic: Ⲡⲁⲣⲙⲟⲩⲧⲉ
- Calendar: Coptic calendar
- Month number: 8
- Number of days: 30
- Gregorian equivalent: April–May

Parmouti (Coptic: Ⲡⲁⲣⲙⲟⲩⲧⲉ, Parmoute), also known as Pharmouthi (Ancient Greek: Φαρμουθί, Pharmouthí) and Barmudah (برموده), is the eighth month of the ancient Egyptian and Coptic calendars. It lasts between April 9 and May 8 of the Gregorian calendar.

It was also the fourth month of the Season of the Emergence, when the Nile floods receded and the crops started to grow throughout the land.

== Name ==
The Coptic name Paremoude derives from the Egyptian Renenutet.

== Coptic Synaxarium of the month of Parmouti ==
Coptic	Julian	Gregorian	Commemorations
Parmouti 1	March 27	April 9	Departure of Aaron, the priest.; Departure of St. Silvanus the monk; Berber attack on the Monastery of St. Macarius; Daesh bombing on St. Mark Cathedral in Alexandria & St. George Church in Tanta, Egypt
Parmouti 2	March 28	April 10	Martyrdom of St. James the Apostle, brother of St. John the Apostle; Martyrdom of St. Christopher; Departure of St. John IX, the 81st Pope of Alexandria
Parmouti 3	March 29	April 11	Departure of St. John, Bishop of Jerusalem; Departure of St. Michael V, the 71st Pope of Alexandria.; Martyrdom of St. Theodorus
Parmouti 4	March 30	April 12	Martyrdom of the Saints Victor, Decius, Eirene the Virgin, and those with them—men, women, and virgins.
Parmouti 5	March 31	April 13	Commemoration of Ezekiel, the Prophet, the son of Buzi; Martyrdom of St. Hepatius, Bishop of Gangra
Parmouti 6	April 1	April 14	Commemoration of the appearance of the Lord to St. Thomas the Apostle after His Resurrection.; Departure of St. Mary of Egypt; Departure of St. Abdel Messih El-Makari.
Parmouti 7	April 2	April 15	Departure of the Righteous Joachim, the Lord Christ’s grandfather.; Departure of St. Macrobius; Departure of Saints Agapius, Theodora, and Metruf
Parmouti 8	April 3	April 16	Martyrdom of the Holy Virgins: Saints Agape, Eirene, and Shiona; Martyrdom of the One Hundred and Fifty believers by the hand of the King of Persia
Parmouti 9	April 4	April 17	Departure of St. Zosimas.; Commemoration of the miracle performed by St. Sinuthius (Shenouda I), the 55th Pope of Alexandria
Parmouti 10	April 5	April 18	Departure of St. Isaac, disciple of St. Apollo.; Departure of St. Gabriel II, the 70th Pope of Alexandria.
Parmouti 11	April 6	April 19	Departure of St. Theodora the nun; Departure of St. John, Bishop of Gaza
Parmouti 12	April 7	April 20	Commemoration of Michael, the Archangel.; Commemoration of St. Antonios, Bishop of Tamoui; Departure of St. Alexander, Bishop of Jerusalem.
Parmouti 13	April 8	April 21	Martyrdom of St. Joshua and St. Joseph, disciples of St. Melius; Commemoration of St. Dionisa (Denisa) the Deaconess and St. Medius the Martyr; Departure of St. John VII, the 77th Pope of Alexandria.; Departure of St. John XVII, the 105th Pope of Alexandria.; Martyrdom of St. Midius
Parmouti 14	April 9	April 22	Departure of St. Maximus, the 15th Pope of Alexandria.
Parmouti 15	April 10	April 23	Consecration of the first altar for Saint Nicholas, Bishop of Myra for the Jacobite Christians; Consecration of the church of St. Agabus the Apostle; Departure of St. Alexandra the Empress; Departure of St. Mark VI, the 101st Pope of Alexandria
Parmouti 16	April 11	April 24	Martyrdom of St. Antipas, Bishop of Pergamon
Parmouti 17	April 12	April 25	Martyrdom of St. James the Apostle, brother of St. John the Apostle
Parmouti 18	April 13	April 26	Martyrdom of St. Arsenius, slave of St. Sousnyous
Parmouti 19	April 14	April 27	Martyrdom of St. Simeon the Armenian, Bishop of Persia, and 150 with him; Martyrdom of St. Youhanna (John) Abu Nagaah El-Kabeer; Martyrdom of the Vizier Abu Elaala Fahd ibn Ibrahim and his companions; Martyrdom of St. Daoud, the Monk
Parmouti 20	April 15	April 28	Martyrdom of St. Babnuda of Dendera
Parmouti 21	April 16	April 29	Commemoration of the Holy Virgin St. Mary, the Mother of God (Theotokos).; Departure of St. Hierotheos of Athens
Parmouti 22	April 17	April 30	Departure of St. Isaac of Hourin; Departure of St. Alexander I, the 19th Pope of Alexandria; Departure of St. Mark II, the 49th Pope of Alexandria; Departure of St. Michael II, the 53rd Pope of Alexandria
Parmouti 23	April 18	May 1	Martyrdom of St. George, Prince of the Martyrs
Parmouti 24	April 19	May 2	Departure of St. Sinuthius (Shenouda I), the 55th Pope of Alexandria; Martyrdom of St. Sina, the Soldier
Parmouti 25	April 20	May 3	Martyrdom of St. Sarah of Antioch and her two sons; Commemoration of Sts. Babnuda (Paphnute) the Hermit, Theodore the Worshipper, and the One Hundred Martyrs
Parmouti 26	April 21	May 4	Martyrdom of St. Sousenyos; Departure of St. John VII, the 78th Pope of Alexandria
Parmouti 27	April 22	May 5	Martyrdom of St. Boctor (Victor), Son of Romanus
Parmouti 28	April 23	May 6	Martyrdom of St. Milius, the Ascetic; Departure of St. Helena, the Empress
Parmouti 29	April 24	May 7	Departure of St. Erastus, the Apostle; Departure of St. Acacius, Bishop of Jerusalem
Parmouti 30	April 25	May 8	Martyrdom of St. Mark, the Apostle & Evangelist of the Land of Egypt
