= Epip =

- Native name: Coptic: Ⲉⲡⲓⲡ
- Calendar: Coptic calendar
- Month number: 11
- Number of days: 30
- Gregorian equivalent: July–August

Epip (Coptic: Ⲉⲡⲓⲡ), also known as Epiphi (Ancient Greek: Ἐπιφί, Epiphí) and Abib (Arabic: أبيب), is the eleventh month of the ancient Egyptian and Coptic calendars. It lasts between July 8 and August 6 of the Gregorian calendar.

The month of Epip is also the third month of the Season of Shemu (Harvest) in ancient Egypt, where the Egyptians harvest their crops throughout the land.

== Coptic Synaxarium of the month of Epip ==
Coptic	Julian	Gregorian	Commemorations
Epip 1	June 25	July 8	Martyrdom of St. Febronia the Ascetic.; Departure of St. Bioukha and St. Tayaban (Banayen) the Priest.
Epip 2	June 26	July 9	Departure of St. Thaddaeus, the Apostle.; Martyrdom of St. Benufa and St. Benaben
Epip 3	June 27	July 10	Departure of St. Cyril, the 24th Pope of Alexandria.; Departure of St. Celestine, Bishop of Rome.
Epip 4	June 28	July 11	Commemoration of the relocation of the relics of Sts. Apakir and John.
Epip 5	June 29	July 12	Martyrdom of Sts. Peter and Paul, the Apostles.
Epip 6	June 30	July 13	Martyrdom of St. Aoulimpas, the Apostle.; Martyrdom of St. Theodosia and her companions.; St. Bartholomew of Rashid
Epip 7	July 1	July 14	Departure of St. Shenouda, the Archimandrite.; Martyrdom of St. Ignatius, Bishop of Antioch.
Epip 8	July 2	July 15	Departure of St. Bishoy.; Martyrdom of St. Piroou and St. Athom.; Martyrdom of St. Balanah, the Priest.; Martyrdom of St. Epime (Pimanon).; Departure of St. Cyrus (Karas), brother of Emperor Theodosius.; St. Marcus of the Monastery of St. Anthony
Epip 9	July 3	July 16	Martyrdom of St. Simon Cleophas, the Apostle.; Departure of St. Cladianus, the 9th Pope of Alexandria.
Epip 10	July 4	July 17	Martyrdom of St. Theodore, Bishop of Pentapolis.; Martyrdom of St. Theodore, Bishop of Corinth, and his companions.; Departure of St. Gabriel VII, the 95th Pope of Alexandria.; Commemoration of St. Olaghi the Anchorite
Epip 11	July 5	July 18	Martyrdom of Saints John and Simon, his cousin.; Departure of St. Isaiah, the hermit.
Epip 12	July 6	July 19	Commemoration of Michael, the Archangel.; Martyrdom of St. Hor of Siriakousy (Syracaus).
Epip 13	July 7	July 20	Departure of St. Pisentius, Bishop of Qift.; Martyrdom of St. Abāmūn of Tukh.; Martyrdom of St. Shenoute, during the early Arab Rule.
Epip 14	July 8	July 21	Martyrdom of St. Procopius (Proconius) of Jerusalem.; Departure of St. Peter V, the 83rd Pope of Alexandria.
Epip 15	July 9	July 22	Departure of St. Ephrem the Syrian.; Martyrdom of St. Cyriacus and St. Julietta, his mother.; Martyrdom of St. Horesius (Harsios) of Soul.
Epip 16	July 10	July 23	Departure of St. John, of the Golden Gospel.; Recovery of the Holy relics of St. George, the Prince of the Martyrs.; Consecration of the Church of St. Philotheus; St. Isidore of Heliopolis
Epip 17	July 11	July 24	Martyrdom of St. Euphemia.
Epip 18	July 12	July 25	Martyrdom of St. James the Apostle, Bishop of Jerusalem.
Epip 19	July 13	July 26	Martyrdom of St. Bidaba, Bishop of Qift, St. Andrew, and St. Christodoulas.; Martyrdom of St. Pantaleemon, the Physician.; Departure of St. John X, the 85th Pope of Alexandria.
Epip 20	July 14	July 27	Martyrdom of St. Theodore of Shotep.
Epip 21	July 15	July 28	Commemoration of the Holy Virgin Saint Mary, the Mother of God (Theotokos).; Departure of St. Sisinnios (Sosenius), the Eunich.
Epip 22	July 16	July 29	Martyrdom of St. Macarius, the son of Basilides (Wasilides) the Minister.; Martyrdom of St. Leontius (Lawendius) of Tripoli.
Epip 23	July 17	July 30	Martyrdom of St. Longinus, the Soldier.; Martyrdom of St. Marina, of Antioch.
Epip 24	July 18	July 31	Ascension of Enoch; Martyrdom of St. Abanoub.; Departure of St. Simeon I, the 42nd Pope of Alexandria.
Epip 25	July 19	August 1	Departure of St. Thecla.; Martyrdom of St. Isaac of Shama.; Martyrdom of St. Hilaria of Damira.; Martyrdom of Sts. Thecla and Mouji.; Martyrdom of St. Anthony of Beba.; Martyrdom of St. Abakragoun.; Martyrdom of St. Domadius El-Souriani (The Syrian).; Consecration of the Church of St. Mercurius.; Departure of St. Palamon, the Father of the Monks.
Epip 26	July 20	August 2	Departure of the upright St. Joseph, the Carpenter.; Departure of St. Timothy I, the 22nd Pope of Alexandria.
Epip 27	July 21	August 3	Consecration of the Church of St. Fam the Soldier.; Martyrdom of St. Abāmūn of Tarnūt.
Epip 28	July 22	August 4	Departure of St. Mary Magdalene.; Commemoration of St. Simon the Tanner.
Epip 29	July 23	August 5	Commemoration of the Holy Gospel, the Nativity, and the Resurrection of Christ; Commemoration of the translocation of the relics of St. Andrew, the Apostle.; Martyrdom of St. Quarshenoufa (Warshenofius).
Epip 30	July 24	August 6	Martyrdom of Sts. Mercurius and Ephraem.
