= Pope Michael VI of Alexandria =

Head of the Coptic Church from 1477 to 1478

Pope Michael VI
- Pope of Alexandria and Patriarch of the See of St. Mark
- Papacy began: 1476/1477
- Papacy ended: 1478
- Predecessor: Gabriel VI
- Successor: John XII

Personal details
- Born: Egypt
- Died: 1478 Egypt
- Buried: Church of the Holy Virgin (Babylon El-Darag)
- Denomination: Coptic Orthodox Christian
- Residence: Church of the Virgin Mary (Haret Zuweila)

Pope Michael VI of Alexandria was the 92nd Pope of Alexandria and Patriarch of the See of St. Mark from 1476/1477 to 1478.

Oriental Orthodox titles
Preceded by Gabriel VI	Coptic Pope; 1476/1477–1478	Succeeded by John XII
