= Pope Gabriel VIII of Alexandria =

Head of the Coptic Church from 1587 to 1603

- Pope of Alexandria and Patriarch of the See of St. Mark
- Papacy began: 20 June 1587
- Papacy ended: 14 May 1603
- Predecessor: John XIV
- Successor: Mark V

Personal details
- Born: Shenouda Meer, Egypt
- Died: 14 May 1603 Egypt
- Buried: Syrian Monastery, Egypt
- Denomination: Coptic Orthodox Christian
- Residence: Church of the Virgin Mary (Haret Zuweila)

Pope Gabriel VIII of Alexandria was the 97th Pope of Alexandria and Patriarch of the See of St. Mark.

Gabriel VIII was originally from Mir (in Middle Egypt in the Asyut Governorate) and his lay name was Shenouda. He became a monk in the Monastery of Saint Pishoy in Scetes and was ordained on Sunday, 16 Paoni, 1303 A.M. (June 20, 1587 AD). Avva Zacharias, Bishop of Jerusalem, and Avva Kyrellos El-Khiami led Gabriel's consecration in the Church of Saint Mercurius in Old Cairo. At the time of his ordination the Copts were divided, and they chose for themselves four different patriarchs. Gabriel's papacy was later accepted by the Coptic community. He was contemporary of the Ottoman Sultan Ahmed I.

During his papacy, Gabriel VIII decreed that the Fast of the Apostles must start on 21 Paoni and end on 5 Epip, and that Advent must start on the first of Koiak. He also suppressed the Fast of Jonah, and allowed the Fast of the Dormition of the Virgin Mary to be optional. The Copts at the time accepted these decisions, but the fasts were reinstituted after his death.

Gabriel VIII died on 9 Pashons, 1319 A.M. (May 14, 1603 AD) in the Syrian Monastery. He occupied the Throne of Saint Mark for 15 years, 10 month, and 24 days.

Oriental Orthodox titles
| Preceded by John XIV | Coptic Pope; 1587–1603 | Succeeded by Mark V |
