= Pope Matthew of Alexandria =

Pope Matthew of Alexandria may refer to:

- Pope Matthew I of Alexandria, ruled in 1378–1408
- Pope Matthew II of Alexandria, ruled in 1453–1466
- Pope Matthew III of Alexandria, ruled in 1631–1646
- Pope Matthew IV of Alexandria, ruled in 1660–1675
