= 1320 =

1320 in various calendars
- Gregorian calendar: 1320; MCCCXX
- Ab urbe condita: 2073
- Armenian calendar: 769; ԹՎ ՉԿԹ
- Assyrian calendar: 6070
- Balinese saka calendar: 1241–1242
- Bengali calendar: 726–727
- Berber calendar: 2270
- English Regnal year: 13 Edw. 2 – 14 Edw. 2
- Buddhist calendar: 1864
- Burmese calendar: 682
- Byzantine calendar: 6828–6829
- Chinese calendar: 己未年 (Earth Goat); 4017 or 3810 — to — 庚申年 (Metal Monkey); 4018 or 3811
- Coptic calendar: 1036–1037
- Discordian calendar: 2486
- Ethiopian calendar: 1312–1313
- Hebrew calendar: 5080–5081
- Hindu calendars
- Vikram Samvat: 1376–1377
- Shaka Samvat: 1241–1242
- Kali Yuga: 4420–4421
- Holocene calendar: 11320
- Igbo calendar: 320–321
- Iranian calendar: 698–699
- Islamic calendar: 719–720
- Japanese calendar: Gen'ō 2 (元応２年)
- Javanese calendar: 1231–1232
- Julian calendar: 1320; MCCCXX
- Korean calendar: 3653
- Minguo calendar: 592 before ROC 民前592年
- Nanakshahi calendar: −148
- Thai solar calendar: 1862–1863
- Tibetan calendar: ས་མོ་ལུག་ལོ་ (female Earth-Sheep); 1446 or 1065 or 293 — to — ལྕགས་ཕོ་སྤྲེ་ལོ་ (male Iron-Monkey); 1447 or 1066 or 294

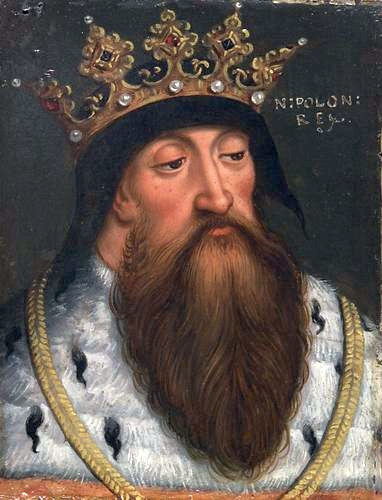
Władysław I, King of Poland from 1320

Year 1320 (MCCCXX) was a leap year starting on Tuesday of the Julian calendar.

== Events ==
=== January – March ===
- January 5 – Henry III, Count of Gorizia, arrives in Padua as the Imperial Vicar with a large army, promising protection to the Italian city state.
- January 20 – Duke Władysław I Łokietek ("Ladislaus the Short") becomes king of a reunited Poland, after receiving the approval from Pope John XXII. He is crowned, along with his wife Jadwiga of Kalisz, at the royal cathedral on Wawel Hill at Kraków. Wladysław's kingdom is surrounded by three hostile neighbors: Brandenburg, the Teutonic Order and Bohemia. Looking for allies, he makes an alliance with Charles I, ruler of Hungary.
- January 25 – Christopher II became king of Denmark.
- February 15 – Pope John XXII grants a mandate to the Archbishop of York, William Melton, to order restitution of confiscated Knights Templar property in England to the Knights Hospitaller.
- February 18 – Walter de Stapledon, Bishop of Exeter, becomes the new Lord High Treasurer of England.
- March 1 – Emperor Renzong of Yuan (China), the Mongol leader Ayurbarwada Buyantu Khan, dies after a reign of almost nine years.
- March 20 (Easter Sunday) – Shepherds' Crusade (Le Pastoureaux): In France, a large group of common people band together in Normandy to begin a crusade, after a teenage shepherd says he was visited by the Holy Spirit. They march south to Aquitaine, attacking castles, royal officials, priests and lepers along the way. Jewish communes are attacked at Saintes, Cahors, Verdun-sur-Garonne, Albi and Toulouse. When they finally cross into Spain, Aragonese forces under Prince Alfonso halt their advance.

=== April – June ===
- April 6 – Declaration of Arbroath: King Robert the Bruce sends a letter to Pope John XXII. He asks him to recognize Scottish sovereignty, and Robert's right to be ruler of Scotland, hoping that he will lift the excommunication order under which Robert is being held for the death of John Comyn III.
- April 19 – Gegeen Khan (Prince Shidibala) becomes the new Mongol Emperor Yingzong of the Yuan dynasty of China after the death of his father, Emperor Renzong, on March 1.
- May 29 – Pope John VIII of Alexandria, leader of the Coptic Orthodox Church, dies in Egypt after a reign of 20 years. He will be succeeded by Pope John IX
- June 4 – King Edward II of England appoints Lord Pembroke as keeper of the realm before traveling to France.
- June 18 – Treaty of Baena: Sultan Ismail I of Granada signs an 8-year truce with Castile at Baena. King James II of Aragon, who receives papal authorization and funds for a crusade against the Emirate of Granada refuses to accept the treaty. Both parties promise to aid one another against their respective enemies. Meanwhile, Ismail consolidates the territories formally under his control with the emirate.
- June 19 – Shepherds' Crusade: Unnerved by the prospect of the arrival of the shepherds at Avignon to begin a crusade, Pope John XXII orders their dispersal.

=== July – September ===
- July – Shepherds' Crusade: Many followers are arrested and executed, after which there are no further incidents and the crusade disperses.
- July 6 –To strengthen the alliance between Hungary and Poland, and with the approval of Pope John XXII, Charles I of Hungary marries Princess Elizabeth of Poland, the 15-year-old daughter King Wladyslaw I.
- July 9 – In India's Delhi Sultanate, Qutbuddin Mubarak Shah is murdered by his favourite, Khusrau Khan, who succeeds him on the throne.
- August 4 – William II de Soules confesses to treason before the Scottish Parliament at a hearing at the "Black Parliament" session held at Scone. For the crime of conspiring against King Robert, Soules is sentenced to life imprisonment at Dumbarton Castle.
- September 5 – Delhi's Sultan Khusrau Khan, who betrayed and murdered Qutbuddin Shah earlier in the year to become ruler in India, is himself betrayed and murdered by his governor, Ghiyath al-Din Tughluq, who founds Delhi's Tughlaq dynasty. Sultan Ghiyath appoints military governors in Punjab and Sindh province, who manage to halt Mongol incursions towards the sultanate.
- September 9 – Battle of Saint George: Byzantine forces under Andronikos Asen defeat the army of the Principality of Achaea, securing the possession of Arcadia. During the battle, Latin commander Bartholomew II Ghisi is taken prisoner, along with several high-ranking nobles of the principality, and is sent to Constantinople.
- September 28 – Pope John IX of Alexandria is elected as the new spiritual leader of the Coptic Orthodox Church, succeeding Pope John VIII.
- September 1320 - Sripada Sri Vallabha, incarnation of Lord Datta, is born in Pithapur, Andhra Pradesh.

=== October – December ===
- October 12 – Andronikos II Palaiologos, who was co-ruler of Byzantium, becomes the sole ruler upon the death of his son Michael IX Palaiologos. Michael's son Andronikos begins a rebellion against his grandfather emperor six months later.
- October 27 – Magnus Birgersson, who had been the crown prince of Sweden until his father, King Birger was forced to flee, is beheaded by order of King Magnus Eriksson. Magnus had defended the Stegeborg Castle in 1318 to allow his father to flee to safety. When the castle surrendered, it was under the condition that Magnus would not be harmed.

=== Date unknown ===
- Autumn – Byzantine forces under Andronikos Asen capture the Latin castles of Akova and Karytaina. They secure control over Arcadia and Cynuria in the Peloponnese.
- Battle of Rhodes: The Knights Hospitaller defeat an attempt by the Turks of Menteshe to capture Rhodes. During the battle, a Turkish invasion fleet (some 80 ships) is destroyed by a smaller Hospitaller-Genoese fleet.
- The Venetian Arsenal, a dockyard for naval ships, is rebuilt, known as the Arsenale Nuovo.
- Henri de Mondeville, French surgeon and physician, writes La Chirurgie, the first textbook on surgery by a Frenchmen.
- Approximate date – Earliest likely date for first permanent settlement of New Zealand by Māori people.

== Births ==
- February 9 – Catherine of Austria, German noblewoman (d. 1349)
- April 8 – Peter I the Cruel, king of Portugal (d. 1367)
- May 25 – Toghon Temür (Emperor Huizong), Mongol emperor (d. 1370)
- October 13 – Perenelle Flamel, French female alchemist (d. 1397)
- date unknown
  - Adalbertus Ranconis de Ericinio, Czech philosopher (d. 1388)
  - Averardo de Medici, Italian nobleman (d. 1363)
  - Beatrice of Bourbon, queen consort of Bohemia (d. 1383)
  - Bertrand du Guesclin, Breton knight and general (d. 1380)
  - Blanka of Namur, queen of Norway and Sweden (d.1363)
  - Chen Youliang, Chinese founder of Chen Han (d. 1363)
  - Constantine Harmenopoulos, Byzantine judge (d. 1385)
  - Gabriele Adorno, Genoese nobleman and doge (d. 1383)
  - Galeazzo II, Italian nobleman (House of Visconti) (d. 1378)
  - Isabella, Scottish noblewoman (House of Stuart) (d. 1389)
  - Jan of Czarnków, Polish nobleman and diplomat (d. 1387)
  - John Mohun V, English nobleman and knight (d. 1376)
  - John Twenge, English preacher, canon and prior (d. 1379)
  - Kitabatake Akinobu, Japanese nobleman (kuge) (d. 1380)
  - Lalleshwari (Lal Ded), Indian mystic and poet (d. 1392)
  - Louis I, king of Naples (Capetian House of Anjou) (d. 1362)
  - Michael Panaretos, Byzantine historian and writer (d. 1390)
  - Neil Loring, English knight and diplomat (d. 1386)
  - Nicholas Szécsi, Hungarian nobleman and knight (d. 1387)
  - Nicodemus of Tismana, Byzantine monk and writer (d. 1406)
  - Nijō Yoshimoto, Japanese nobleman and waka poet (d. 1388)
  - Nissim of Gerona, Spanish talmudist and scholar (d. 1380)
  - Otto the Tarantine, German nobleman and prince (d. 1398)
  - Ragibagh Khan (Tianshun), Mongol emperor (d. 1328)
  - Siemowit III, Polish nobleman (House of Piast) (d. 1381)
  - Ugolino Gonzaga, Italian nobleman and knight (d. 1362)
  - Valdemar IV Atterdag, King of Denmark (d.1375)

== Deaths ==
- January 12 – John Dalderby, English bishop and chancellor
- January 21 – Árni Helgason, Icelandic cleric and bishop (b. 1260)
- February 7 – Jan Muskata, Polish bishop and chancellor (b. 1250)
- March 1 – Ayurbarwada Buyantu Khan, Mongol emperor (b. 1285)
- March 21 – Wernher von Homberg, Swiss nobleman and knight
- April 13 – Margaret of Castello, Italian nun and teacher (b. 1287)
- April 24 – Abu Said Faraj, Nasrid advisor and governor (b. 1248)
- May 2 – Joan Butler (Joan FitzGerald), Irish noblewoman (b. 1281)
- May 29 – John VIII, Egyptian pope of the Coptic Orthodox Church
- June 5 – Peter of Aspelt, German priest, chancellor and archbishop
- July 9 – Qutbuddin Mubarak Shah, Indian ruler of the Delhi Sultanate
- July 27 – Heinrich von Plötzke, German knight and marshal (b. 1264)
- October 12 – Michael IX Palaiologos, Byzantine emperor (b. 1277)
- October 31 – Ricold of Monte Croce, Italian missionary and writer
- date unknown
  - Alessandro Novello, Italian bishop and inquisitor (b. 1250)
  - Anna Palaiologina, Byzantine princess and queen consort
  - Antonius Andreas, Spanish monk and theologian (b. 1280)
  - Arnaud d'Aux, French bishop and cardinal-bishop (b. 1270)
  - Bernard Délicieux, French monk, prior and priest (b. 1260)
  - Chosgi Odsir, Mongol monk, translator and writer (b. 1260)
  - Dominic II Rátót, Hungarian nobleman, knight and palatine
  - Geoffrey of Paris, French monk, chronicler and historian
  - Henri de Mondeville, French surgeon and physician
  - Henry II, Margrave of Brandenburg-Stendal ("Henry the Child"), 12, ruler of Brandenburg
  - Ilbasan, Mongol ruler (House of Borjigin)
  - Li Kan (Zhong Bin), Chinese official and painter
  - Maria Afonso, Portuguese noblewoman and nun
  - Mojs II Ákos, Hungarian nobleman and rebel leader
  - Nicholas de Balscote, English judge and chancellor
  - Olivier III de Clisson, Breton nobleman and co-ruler
  - Radulphus Brito, French grammarian and philosopher
  - Robert de Welles, English nobleman and landowner
  - Roger de Mowbray, Scottish nobleman and landowner
  - William III, Burgundian nobleman and knight (b. 1280)
  - Yasa'ur, Mongol nobleman, prince and general (b. 1289)
