= Pope Peter V of Alexandria =

Head of the Coptic Church from 1340 to 1348

Pope Peter V
- Pope of Alexandria and Patriarch of the See of St. Mark
- Papacy began: 2 Jan 1340 AD
- Papacy ended: 6 Jul 1348 AD
- Predecessor: Benjamin II
- Successor: Mark IV

Orders
- Consecration: 2 Jan 1340 AD

Personal details
- Born: Egypt
- Died: 6 Jul 1348 AD Egypt
- Buried: Church of the Holy Virgin (Babylon El-Darag)
- Denomination: Coptic Orthodox Christian
- Residence: Saint Mercurius Church in Coptic Cairo

Pope Peter V of Alexandria was the 83rd Pope of Alexandria and Patriarch of the See of St. Mark from 1340 to 1348.

His episcopate lasted for 8 years, 6 months and 6 days from 2 January 1340 AD (6 Tobi 1056 AM) to 6 July 1348 AD (14 Abib 1064 AM). Upon his death, he was buried in the Church of the Holy Virgin (also known as Deir Al-Habash دير الحبش بمصر القديمة). The See of St Mark remained vacant for 60 days after his death until his successor, Pope Mark IV, the 84th Patriarch, was elevated to the episcopal see on 5 September 1348 AD (8 Thout 1064 AM).

In his time, the Papal Residence was at the Church of The Holy Virgin Mary and St Mercurius in Haret Zuweila (حارة زويلة) in Coptic Cairo.

== Contemporary Rulers of Egypt During His Episcopate ==
His time in the Patriarchate coincided with a series of Mamluke leaders (Sultans):

Al-Malik (Sultan) an-Nasir Nasir ad-Din Muhammad ibn Qalawun (third time) (1309–1340) — (الملك الناصر ناصر الدين محمد بن قلاوون) — commonly known as an-Nasir Muhammad (الناصر محمد), or by his kunya: Abu al-Ma'ali (أبو المعالى) or as Ibn Qalawun (1285–1341). He was the ninth Mamluk sultan (Bahri Mamluk Sultan) of Egypt who ruled for three reigns: December 1293–December 1294, 1299–1309, and 1310 until his death in 1341.

Al-Malik (Sultan) al-Mansur Sayf ad-Din Abu Bakr (1340–1341) — (الملك المنصور سيف الدين أبو بكر) — better known as al-Mansur Abu Bakr (أبو بكر المنصور/ المنصور أبو بكر), (b. ca. 1321 – d. November 1341). He was the tenth Bahri Mamluk sultan, who reigned briefly in 1340–1341. His father was Sultan an-Nasir Muhammad (r. 1310–41). In June 1341, he became sultan, the first of several sons of an-Nasir Muhammad to accede to the throne. However, his reign was short-lived; in August, Abu Bakr was deposed and arrested by his father's senior emir, Qawsun. Abu Bakr was imprisoned in the Upper Egyptian city of Qus, along with many of his brothers, and executed on Qawsun's orders two months later. He was formally succeeded by his younger half-brother, al-Ashraf Kujuk, but Qawsun was left as the strongman of the sultanate.

Sultan al-Ashraf Kujuk Alladin Ben Mohamed (1341–1342) - علاء الدين الأشرف -

Sultan Nasser Shahab El-Dein Ben Mohamed (1342) - أحمد الناصر -

Sultan Saleh Emad Eddin Ben Mohamed (1342–1345) - إسماعيل الصالح -

Sultan Kamil Seif Eddin Ben Mohamed (1345–1346) - شعبان الكامل -

Sultan Muzafar Zein Eddin Ben Mohamed (1346–1347) - ابن نثر المظفر -

Sultan Nasser Hassan Ben Mohamed (first time)(1347–1351) - السلطان حسن

== Life ==
After the repose of his Predecessor Pope Benjamin II (the 82nd Patriarch of Alexandria) on 6 January 1339 AD, the Episcopal Seat remained vacant for about a year (11 months and 26 days) until Boutros ibn Dawood (Peter son of David بطرس ابن داود) was chosen as patriarch under the name Pope Peter V of Alexandria.

Boutros was a monk at the monastery of Monastery of Saint Macarius the Great (دير أبى مقار) in the Nitrian Desert. He then became a priest of the monastery of Shahran (دير شهران). He became the 83rd Patriarch on 2 January 1340 AD, towards the end of the reign of Al-Sultan Al-Nasir ibn Qalawun (الملك الناصر ناصر الدين محمد بن قلاوون).

The entire period from the seventh century to the nineteenth century was a period of continual persecution of the Egyptian Church by various Muslim rulers, with short periods of peace when the persecution would drop in intensity. However, the time of Pope Peter V was a time of relative peace compared to the general atmosphere of the era.

In one incidence, in May 1341, towards the end of the reign of Al-Sultan Al-Nasir, the Sultan banned the celebration known as the Feast of the Martyr that the Christians held annually on the 8th of Bashans (May) in the Shubra district.

In another incidence, an Islamic judge in one of the cities had imprisoned a Copt, claiming that his grandfather was not a Christian and he wanted him to convert to Islam. He refused and the Copts stormed the prison and brought him out. The city became violent against the Copts. The rioters desecrated the tombs of the Copts and burned the bodies of the dead. As the city descended into disarray, its governor lodged a complaint with the Sultan of Egypt, who removed the Islamic judge.

Pope Peter V consecrated the Holy Oil of Chrismation (Miron) twice. The first was in the third year of his episcopate (1342 AD, 1058 AM), Pope Peter V consecrated the Miron at the Monastery of Saint Macarius the Great (the monastery of Abu Makar) with twelve bishops, following Coptic custom, in the final days of Lent. Among those who attended the consecration with the twelve bishops was a priest named Rev. father Assaad Faraj Allah (القس الأسعد فرج الله ابن القس الأكرم قسيس المعلقة الشيخ المعلم يوحنا بن أخ البابا يوأنس الثامن البطريرك). Another priest and monk who also attended the consecration was Rev Fr. Gabriel, who later succeeded Pope Peter V to the episcopal throne as Pope Mark IV. The second time he consecrated the Miron was in the seventh year of his episcopate (1346 AD, 1062 AM).

After the pope's return from the Nitrian Desert to Cairo following the consecration of the Holy Oil in April 1346 AD, another persecution of the Christians broke out in Cairo, which lasted for about two years until Pope Peter's death.

His feast day is 14 Apip.

Oriental Orthodox titles
Preceded by Benjamin II	Coptic Pope; 1340–1348	Succeeded by Mark IV
