= Pope Mark VIII of Alexandria =

Head of the Coptic Church from 1796 to 1809

- Pope of Alexandria & Patriarch of the See of St. Mark
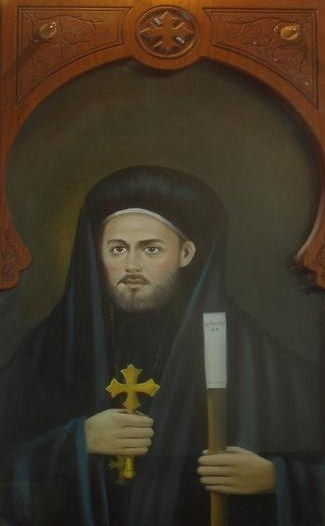
- Papacy began: 2 October 1796 AD (24 Thout 1513 AM)
- Papacy ended: 21 December 1809 (13 Kiahk 1526 AM)
- Predecessor: John XVIII
- Successor: Peter VII

Personal details
- Born: John Tama, Girga, Egypt
- Died: 21 December 1809 Egypt
- Buried: Saint Mark's Coptic Orthodox Cathedral (Azbakeya)
- Denomination: Coptic Orthodox Christian
- Residence: 1796–1800 Saint Mary Church (Haret Elroum) 1800–1809 Saint Mark's Coptic Orthodox Cathedral (Azbakeya)

Pope Mark VIII of Alexandria (Abba Marcos VIII), was the 108th Pope of Alexandria & Patriarch of the See of St. Mark.

== Background ==
He was born in the town of Tama, in the district of Girga in Upper Egypt. His birth name was John.

He became a monk in the Monastery of Saint Anthony near the Red Sea.

When his predecessor, Abba Yoannis, the 107th Patriarch departed, the papal seat remained vacant for four months, then this father was chosen as a patriarch and ordained on 2 October 1796 AD (24 Thout 1513 AM)

He lived through Three forms of governments in Egypt: first under Ottoman governors of the Ottoman Empire, then the French Invasion of Egypt (1797–1801 AD), two years after his ordination, then the Ottomans returned again in 1801.

He consecrated the new Saint Mark's Coptic Orthodox Cathedral in Azbakeya in Cairo that was built by Al-Moallim Ibrahim El-Gohary and moved the Seat of the Coptic Pope to this cathedral in 1800. from Saint Mary Church (Haret Elroum).

In his days, there were many unfortunate situations and grievances against the church and the Copts, including the burning of the upper and lower churches in Haret Elroum.

Pope Mark VIII of Alexandria departed on 21 December 1809. He remained on his episcopal seat 13 years, 2 months, and 19 days. The papal seat remained vacant for three days after his departure.

Oriental Orthodox titles
Preceded by John XVIII	Coptic Pope; 1796–1809	Succeeded by Peter VII
