= John XII =

John XII may refer to:

- Pope John XII, ruled 955–964
- John XII bar Maʿdani, Syriac Orthodox Patriarch of Antioch 1252–1263
- John XII of Constantinople, Ecumenical Patriarch 1294–1303
- Pope John XII of Alexandria, ruled 1480–1483
- John XII Peter El Hajj, Maronite Patriarch of Antioch 1890–1898

== See also ==
- John 12, the twelfth chapter of the Gospel of John
