= Patriarch John IX =

Patriarch John IX may refer to:

- John IX of Constantinople, Ecumenical Patriarch of Constantinople in 1111–1134
- Patriarch John IX of Antioch (ruled in 1155–1159)
- Pope John IX of Alexandria, Pope of Alexandria & Patriarch of the See of St. Mark in 1320–1327
- The 52nd Maronite Patriarch, John IX (ruled in 1608–1633)
