= Patriarch John XII =

Patriarch John XII may refer to:

- John XII bar Maʿdani, Syriac Orthodox Patriarch of Antioch in 1252–1263
- John XII of Constantinople, Ecumenical Patriarch of Constantinople in 1294–1303
- Pope John XII of Alexandria, Pope of Alexandria & Patriarch of the See of St. Mark in 1480–1483
- John XII Peter El Hajj, Maronite Patriarch of Antioch in 1890–1898
