= Patriarch John XIV =

Patriarch John XIV may refer to:

- John XIV of Constantinople, Patriarch of Constantinople in 1334–1347
- Pope John XIV of Alexandria, Pope of Alexandria & Patriarch of the See of St. Mark in 1571–1586
