= Matthias II =

Matthias II may refer to:

- Matthias II, Duke of Lorraine (ca. 1193 – 1251)
- Pope Matthew II of Alexandria, ruled in 1453–1466
- Matthias, Holy Roman Emperor (1557–1619), Holy Roman Emperor, King of Hungary, Croatia and Bohemia
