= Parsoma =

Coptic saint

Saint Parsoma
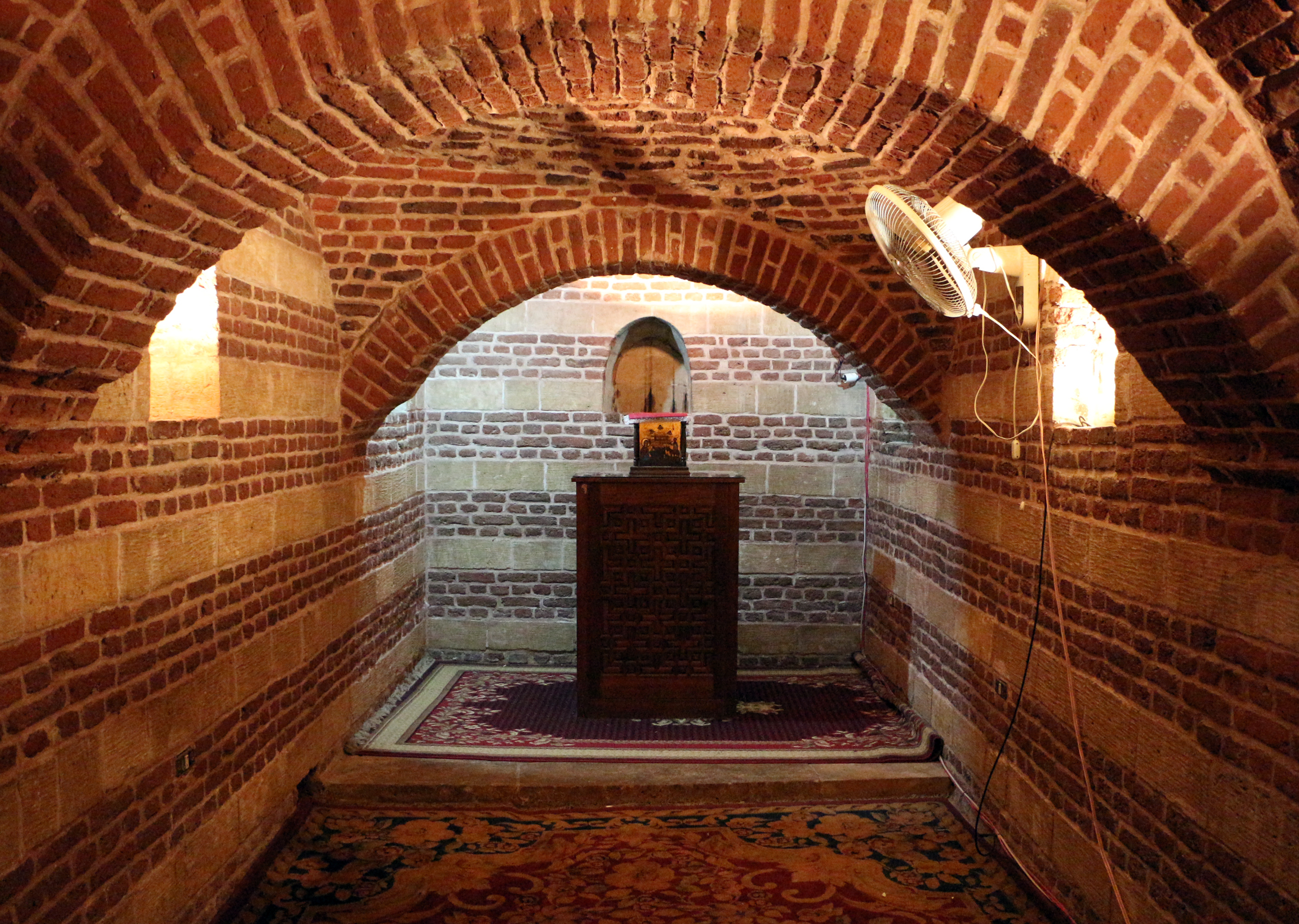
- Prison cell of St. Parsoma, Saint Mercurius Church in Coptic Cairo
- Born: Cairo, Egypt
- Died: 1317
- Venerated in: Coptic Orthodox Church

Parsoma the Naked (otherwise known as Barsoum El Arian; Coptic: Ⲁⲃⲃⲁ Ⲡⲁⲣⲥⲱⲙⲁ Ⲡⲓⲣⲉϥⲃⲏϣ; 1257–1317) was a Coptic saint.

== History ==
=== Early life ===
Parsoma was born in Cairo. His father was El-Wageeh Moufdel, the scribe of the Queen Shajarat al-Durr, and his mother was from the noble family of El-Taban. After his parents died, his uncle took possession of all that they had left. Parsoma did not quarrel with him but rather forsook the world and lived the life of a hermit.

=== Ascetic life ===
Parsoma lived outside the city of Cairo for five years suffering the harshness of the summer heat and the winter cold. He wore no clothing except a hairy sackcloth, following the example of Paul of Thebes, the first hermit. Then he shut himself in a cave inside the church of St. Philopateer Mercurius for twenty years in ceaseless prayer and fasting. In his cave, there was a huge serpent, which Parsoma befriended and tamed through his prayers.

=== Later life and persecution ===
After some time, Parsoma left the cave and lived on the roof of the church. He endured the summer heat and the winter cold, until his skin became dark from much worship and asceticism. He remained in this state for fifteen years. During his days, a great persecution befell the Christians in Egypt. The churches were shut and the Christians were forced to wear blue turbans. The ruler seized Parsoma, severely beat him and put him in prison; when he was released, he went to the monastery of Shahran, where he lived on the roof of the church and increased in his asceticism. Many princes, judges and others, knew that he always wore a white turban, but no one dared to force him to wear a blue one.

=== Departure ===
Parsoma died on the 5th day of the Little Month (Koji Enavot) (10 September), 1317 A.D. at the age of sixty. Pope John VIII presided over his funeral. He was buried at the Monastery of Shahran.

== See also ==
- Coptic Christianity
