= Ibrahim El-Gohary =

Coptic prime minister of Egypt

Ibrahim El-Gohary (Coptic: ⲓⲃⲣⲁϩⲓⲙ ⲉⲗϫⲁⲟϩⲁⲣⲓ or ⲓⲗϫⲟϩⲁⲣⲓ, Arabic: إبراهيم الجوهري, died 31 May 1795) was Egypt's chief scribe and prime minister during the second half of the 18th century.

== Biography ==
Ibrahim El-Gohary was born to poor Coptic Christian parents in Qalyub. His father, Youssef El-Gohary, made clothes for living. As a young child, Ibrahim excelled in writing and arithmetic. When he grew up, he began to transcribe religious books and distribute them to churches at his own expense. This action drew the attention of Pope John XVIII, who met with Ibrahim and blessed him. The Pope also mediated on Ibrahim's behalf and he became the chief scribe of Master Rizk, another prominent Copt at that time. When Muhammad Abu-'l-Dhahab was reigned as the ruler of Egypt, Ibrahim El-Gohary became the chief scribe of entire Egypt, a position equivalent to that of a prime minister today.

Ibrahim had one son named Youssef and one daughter named Demiana. Youssef died at a young age, shortly before his wedding. Demiana died a short time afterwards without having been married.

Ibrahim El-Gohary was very loved by the Egyptians. He was also named The Sultan of the Copts for his great love and attachment to his Coptic identity.

The famous historian Abd al-Rahman al-Jabarti wrote about Ibrahim El-Gohary, saying:

- "He had made Egypt great by his capability which endured for long time. He was one of the great world statesmen with a great decisive mind. He treated everyone according to their abilities, and did things that attracted the hearts and the love of the people to him."

== Building churches ==
Ibrahim El-Gohary was known for his love for building new churches and monasteries, and for repairing those that had fallen into ruin.

Due to his influential position in the government and his great favour to the Muslim rulers, he was able to issue fatwas that permitted the Copts to rebuild the destroyed churches and monasteries. This was of particular importance because the Copts were not allowed to build new churches or to repair old ones unless they got official government approval, which was rarely granted.

One of these churches that he built is the Saint Mark's Coptic Orthodox Cathedral in Azbakeya in Cairo, that his brother completed and congregated by Pope Mark VIII in 1800.

Ibrahim El-Gohary also donated many endowment of good land and money for the reconstruction, that amounted to 238 endowments as documented in the Coptic Orthodox Patriarchate.

In 1794 Ibrahim El-Gohary renovated Saint Mary Church (Haret Elroum) which was the Seat of the Coptic Orthodox Pope of Alexandria at the time.

Ibrahim El-Gohary remained in his position until a coup d'etat by Hasan Qubtan forced him, along with Murad Bey and Ibrahim Bey to flee to Upper Egypt. Qubtan persecuted the Copts, forbidding them to ride horses with saddles or to use Muslims as servants. Hasan Qubtan also confiscated all of El-Gohary's belongings and endowments. On 7 August 1791, Murad Bey, Ibrahim Bey and Ibrahim El-Gohary returned to Cairo and El-Gohary assumed his former position.

== Death ==
Ibrahim El-Gohary died four years later, on Monday, 25 Pashons, 1511 A.M. (31 May 1795) His eulogy was made by Pope John XVIII, and his funeral was attended by Ibrahim Bey. He was buried in a private tomb that he had built for himself next to the church of Saint George in Old Cairo.

== See also ==
- Coptic Orthodox Church

== Sources ==
- Coptic Synaxarium
