= Cosmas II =

Cosmas II may refer to:

- Pope Cosmas II of Alexandria, ruled in 851–858
- Cosmas II of Constantinople, Ecumenical Patriarch in 1146–1147
- Cosmas II of Alexandria, Greek Patriarch of Alexandria in 1723–1736
