= Pope John VIII of Alexandria =

Head of the Coptic Church from 1300 to 1320

- Pope of Alexandria and Patriarch of the See of St. Mark
- Papacy began: 14 February 1300
- Papacy ended: 29 May 1320
- Predecessor: Theodosius III
- Successor: John IX

Personal details
- Born: Yohanna Ben-Ebsal Bani-Khosaim, Egypt
- Died: 29 May 1320 Egypt
- Buried: Shahran Monastery
- Denomination: Coptic Orthodox Christian
- Residence: Saint Mercurius Church in Coptic Cairo

John VIII ibn Qiddis (died 29 May 1320) was the 80th pope of the Coptic Orthodox Church from 14 February 1300 until his death.

Pope John VIII was born in Meniat Bani-Khosaim. His real name was Yohanna Ben-Ebsal, but he was known as El Mo'ataman Ebn El-Kedees. He became monk at the Monastery of Shahran and was ordained Pope on 19 Meshir 1016 AM (14 February 1300 AD).

During the papacy of John VIII, severe tribulations befell the Christians in Egypt and heavy taxes were imposed. An official from Morocco was displeased to find the Copts so active in the financial sector. Many churches were closed in Cairo and in different parts of the country. Exceptions were the monasteries in Alexandria and a few churches in other cities. An envoy from the emperor of Ethiopia came to intercede on behalf of the Christians. Two churches were subsequently opened, one of them was the Coptic Orthodox church of the Church of the Virgin Mary (Haret Zuweila), and the other was the Melkite church of Saint Nicholas in El-Hamzawe.

Pope John VIII was a contemporary of Saint Parsoma, and presided over his funeral. He was the last to reside in the church of Saint Mercurius Church in Coptic Cairo. He was the first to relocate the patriarchal throne to the Church of the Virgin Mary (Haret Zuweila). He was residing there in the year 1303 AD. when a severe earthquake caused great destruction in Syria and Egypt. Ebn Kabre indicated that Pope John VIII had made some changes in the Liturgy. He died on 4 Paoni 1036 A.M. (29 May 1320 AD) after 20 years, 3 months, and 15 days on the Patriarchal Throne.

Religious titles
Preceded by Theodosius III	Coptic Pope; 1300–1320	Succeeded by John IX
