= Nový Tekov =

Nový Tekov Újbars
- Municipality
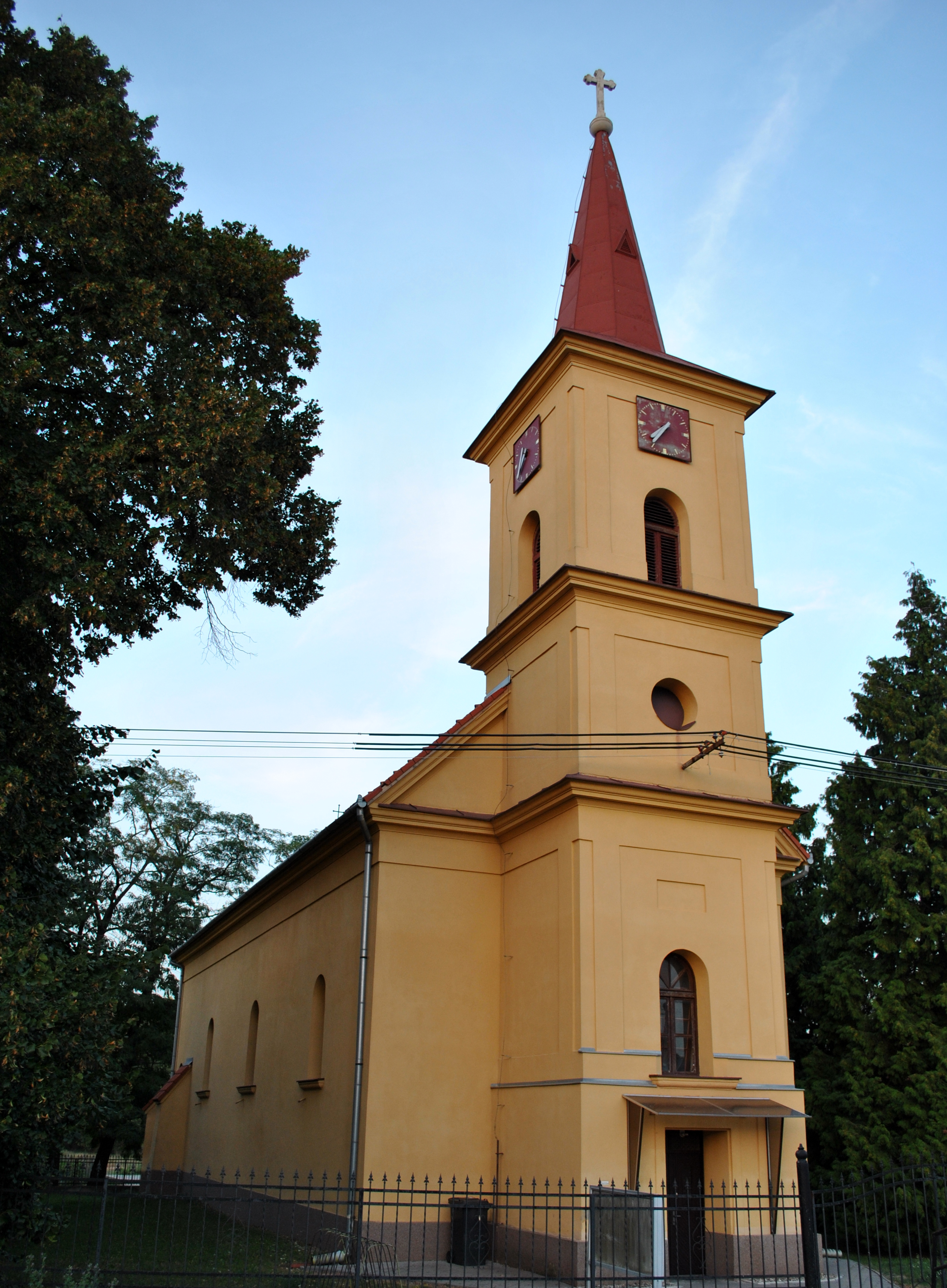

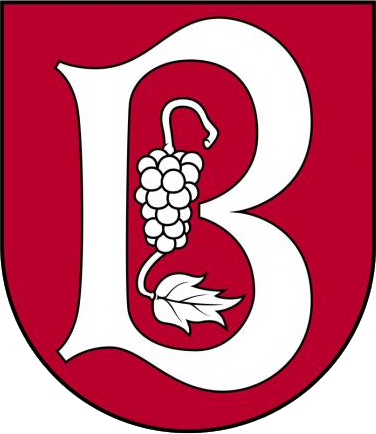
- Flag Coat of arms

- Location of Nový Tekov in the Nitra Region Location of Nový Tekov in Slovakia
- Coordinates: 48.25°N 18.52°E
- Country: Slovakia
- Region: Nitra Region
- District: Levice District
- First mentioned: 1320

Area
  - Total: 29.70 km^{2} (11.47 sq mi)
- Elevation: 171 m (561 ft)

Population (2025)
  - Total: 948
- Time zone: UTC+1 (CET)
  - Summer (DST): UTC+2 (CEST)
- Postal code: 935 33
- Area code: +421 36
- Vehicle registration plate (until 2022): LV
- Website: www.novytekov.sk

Nový Tekov (Hungarian: Újbars) is an old village and municipality in the Levice District in the Nitra Region of Slovakia.

== History ==
In historical records the village was first mentioned in 1320.

== Geography ==
The municipality lies at an altitude of 171 metres (561 ft) and covers an area of 29.70 km^{2} (11.47 sq mi) (2025).

== Population ==
Population statistic (10 years)
Year	1995	2005	2015	2025
Count	927	836	858	948
Difference		−9.81%	+2.63%	+10.48%

Population statistic
Year	2024	2025
Count	935	948
Difference		+1.39%

It has a population of 948 people (31 December 2025).

=== Ethnicity ===
Census 2021 (1+ %)
Ethnicity	Number	Fraction
Slovak	796	88.74%
Not found out	55	6.13%
Hungarian	55	6.13%
Total	897	

In year 2021 was 897 people by ethnicity 796 as Slovak, 55 as Not found out, 55 as Hungarian, 5 as Czech, 2 as Other, 1 as Italian, 1 as Rusyn and 1 as Austrian.

Note on population: The difference values of population numbers in the table "Population statistic" and in the sections "Ethnicity" & "Religion" is caused by the use of various statistical methods.

=== Religion ===
Census 2021 (1+ %)
Religion	Number	Fraction
Roman Catholic Church	462	51.51%
None	229	25.53%
Evangelical Church	69	7.69%
Not found out	55	6.13%
Calvinist Church	39	4.35%
Church of the Brethren	21	2.34%
Total	897	

In year 2021 was 897 people by religion 462 from Roman Catholic Church, 229 from None, 69 from Evangelical Church, 55 from Not found out, 39 from Calvinist Church, 21 from Church of the Brethren, 6 from Christian Congregations in Slovakia, 4 from Ad hoc movements, 3 from Baptists Church, 2 from Greek Catholic Church, 2 from Seventh-day Adventist Church, 1 from Eastern Orthodox Church, 1 from Other and not ascertained christian church, 1 from Jehovah's Witnesses, 1 from Islam and 1 from Other.

== Facilities ==
The village has a public library and football pitch. It also has its own birth registry.
