= Pope Benjamin II of Alexandria =

Head of the Coptic Church from 1327 to 1339

- Pope of Alexandria and Patriarch of the See of St. Mark
- Papacy began: 10 May 1327 AD
- Papacy ended: 6 Jan 1339 AD
- Predecessor: John IX
- Successor: Peter V

Orders
- Ordination: 10 May 1327 AD
- Consecration: 10 May 1327 AD

Personal details
- Born: Benjamin Egypt
- Died: 6 Jan 1339 AD Egypt
- Buried: Shahran Monastery
- Denomination: Coptic Orthodox Christian
- Residence: Saint Mercurius Church in Coptic Cairo

Pope Benjamin II of Alexandria was the 82nd Pope of Alexandria and Patriarch of the See of St. Mark from 1327 to 1339. His episcopate lasted for eleven years, seven months and 26 days from 10 May 1327 (15 Pachons 1043 AM) to 6 January 1339 (11 Tobah 1055 AM).

The See of St Mark remained vacant for 11 months and 26 days after his death. He died on the day of the feast of Epiphany (6 January 1339, 11 Tobah 1055 AM). He was buried in Deir Shahran (the monastery of Shahran). His body was later transferred to the Monastery of Abba Bishoy in the Nitrian Desert, the monastery that he restored after it was destroyed in riots. In his time, the Papal Residence was at the Church of The Holy Virgin Mary and St Mercurius in the Coptic quarter of Cairo.

== Contemporary Rulers of Egypt During His Episcopate ==
He episcopate was at the time of the third reign of Al-Sultan Al-Nasser Ibn Qalawun. El-Malik el-Nasser Nasr el-Din Muhammad ibn Qalawun ( الملك الناصر ناصر الدين محمد بن قلاوون), commonly known as Al-Nasir Muhammad ( الناصر محمد), or by his kunya: Abu'l Maali or as Ibn Qalawun (born 1285– died 1341 AD) who was the ninth Mamluk sultan of Egypt. Al-Nasir Muhammad ruled for three reigns: first as a child (December 1293–December 1294), then from 1299–1309, and a third reign from 1310 until his death in 1341.

== Brief biography ==
His name at birth was Benjamin. He was born in a town of Demicrat (دميقراط) at the deep south of Egypt. He loved the life of solitude and tranquility and thus he led a life of solitude in the desert near his hometown. As many of his relatives and acquaintances started visiting him, he left the place and went to the monastery of the Mule in the Mount Tura to realize his longing for the life of solitude away from people. This was not possible, as soon his virtues became known. Many believers admired him and came asking for his advice and for his prayers. When Abba Barsoum El-Aarian saw him, he prophesied that he would sit on the throne of St. Mark. Indeed, 43 days after the repose of Pope John IX, the 81st patriarch, the bishops gathered at the Patriarchate to elect the monk Benjamin from Deir al-Baqal in Mount Tura. He was ordained on 15 Bashans 1043 AM (10 May 1327 AD) and was called Benjamin II.

In his days, as characteristic of the entire period, a storm of persecution and distress fell on the Copts. Many churches and monasteries were destroyed. The monks and nuns were harassed, and the life of the bishops became especially hard. Of particular mention was a wave of persecution unleashed by the governor Sharaf el-Din ibn el-Taj, who remained in office for one year and then he died. His successor was a patient and fair governor who treated Muslims and Christians with fairness. Thus, Abba Benjamin was able to rebuild what was destroyed of the churches and monasteries especially the monastery of Abba Bishoy in the Nitrian Dessert, which had been completely destroyed.

In the third year of his papacy (March 1330 AD, 1046 AM), 20 bishops gathered in the Monastery of Saint Macarius the Great during Lent to consecrate the Holy Oil of Chrismation (Miron).

Then, the church faced a new wave of distress, this time at the hands of Sultan Al-Nasir Muhammad. The Emperor of Ethiopia intervened to create an atmosphere of peace between the Patriarch and the Sultan, which restored a period of tranquility.

Oriental Orthodox titles
Preceded by John IX	Coptic Pope; 1327–1339	Succeeded by Peter V
