= Pope Mark IV of Alexandria =

Head of the Coptic Church from 1348 to 1363

Pope Mark IV
- Pope of Alexandria and Patriarch of the See of St. Mark
- Papacy began: 5 September 1348 AD
- Papacy ended: 31 January 1363 AD
- Predecessor: Peter V
- Successor: John X

Orders
- Consecration: 5 September 1348 AD

Personal details
- Born: al-As‘ad Faraj Qaliub, Egypt
- Died: 31 January 1363 AD Egypt
- Buried: The Monastery of Shahran (دير شهران)
- Denomination: Coptic Orthodox Christian
- Residence: Saint Mercurius Church in Coptic Cairo

Pope Mark IV of Alexandria (born al-As‘ad Faraj) was the 84th Pope of Alexandria and Patriarch of the See of St. Mark from 1348/1349 to 1363.

The episcopate of Pope Mark IV (البابا مرقس الرابع) lasted for 14 years, 4 months and 26 days from 5 September 1348 AD (8 Thout 1064 AM) to 31 January 1363 AD (8 Amsheer 1079 AM). He died on 31 January 1363 AD and was buried in the monastery of Shahran (دير شهران). The See of St Mark remained vacant for 3 months and 6 days after his death.

In his time, the Papal Residence was at the Church of The Holy Virgin Mary & St Mercurius in Haret Zuweila (حارة زويلة) in Coptic Cairo.

== Biography ==
After the death of his predecessor Pope Peter V (the 83rd Patriarch of Alexandria) on 6 July 1348, the Episcopal Seat remained vacant for two months (60 days). A monk (and also a priest) by the name of Gabriel (أبونا الراهب القس غبريال) from the Monastery of Shahran (دير شهران) was chosen as patriarch under the name Pope Mark IV of Alexandria. It was the monastery where his predecessor, Pope Peter V, used to be its priest before his elevation to the episcopal seat in 1340. At the time of his elevation to the episcopal seat, Gabriel was assigned to serve at the Church of the Holy Virgin Mary and St Damiana, known as the Hanging Church in Coptic Cairo (كنيسة العذراء المعروفة بالمعلقة). Gabriel was also one of those who attended the consecration of the Holy Oil of Chrismation (Miron) in 1342 at the time of his predecessor, Pope Peter V (Episcopate 1340 - 1348).

His name at birth was Farag-Allah (فرج الله). He was from the city of Qaliub, in the Nile delta, just to the north of Cairo. He was a monk at the monastery of Shahran (دير شهران) who then became a priest at the same monastery and then was assigned to serve at the Church of the Holy Virgin Mary and St Damiana, known as the Hanging Church in Coptic Cairo (كنيسة العذراء المعروفة بالمعلقة). Finally, he became the 84th Patriarch on 5 September 1348.

Mark IV died on 31 January 1363.

Oriental Orthodox titles
Preceded by Peter V	Coptic Pope; 1348/1349–1363	Succeeded by John X
