= Pope Cosmas =

Pope Cosmas may refer to:

- Pope Cosmas I of Alexandria, 44th pope of the Coptic Orthodox Church from 729-730.
- Pope Cosmas II of Alexandria, 54th pope of the Coptic Orthodox Church from 851-858.
- Pope Cosmas III of Alexandria, 58th pope of the Coptic Orthodox Church from 920-932.
