= Gabriel III =

Gabriel III may refer to:

- Pope Gabriel III of Alexandria, ruled in 1268–1271
- Gabriel III of Constantinople, Ecumenical Patriarch in 1702–1707
