= John XIV =

John XIV may refer to:

- Pope John XIV, ruled in 983–984
- John XIV of Constantinople, ecumenical patriarch in 1334–1347
- Pope John XIV of Alexandria, ruled in 1571–1586

== See also ==
- John 14, the fourteenth chapter of the Gospel of John
