= Pope Gabriel VII of Alexandria =

Head of the Coptic Church from 1525 to 1570

Saint Gabriel VII of Alexandria
- Pope of Alexandria and Patriarch of the See of St. Mark
- Papacy began: 1525
- Papacy ended: 1570
- Predecessor: John XIII
- Successor: John XIV

Personal details
- Born: Manfalout, Egypt
- Died: 1570 Egypt
- Buried: Saint Mercurius Church in Coptic Cairo
- Denomination: Coptic Orthodox Christian
- Residence: Church of the Virgin Mary (Haret Zuweila)

Sainthood
- Feast day: (10 Epip in the Coptic calendar)

Papal styles of Saint Gabriel VII
- Reference style: His Holiness
- Spoken style: Your Holiness
- Religious style: Pope and Patriarch
- Posthumous style: Saint

Pope Gabriel VII of Alexandria (Anba Gabriel VII) was the 95th Coptic Orthodox Pope of Alexandria and Patriarch of the See of St. Mark.

He was born in the area around the monastery of El-Mouharraq, and at a young age he became a monk in the wilderness at the Monastery of Saint Macarius the Great. He was ordained Patriarch in 1525 A.D. following the death of Pope John XIII. Gabriel was patriarch for more than forty years; his patriarchate spanned the early years of Ottoman rule in Egypt.

He renovated the monasteries of Saint Anthony, and Saint Paul, the first hermit, in the Eastern desert, and the monastery of El-Mouharraq in Upper Egypt.

Pope Gabriel died in 1570 following a brief illness.

Oriental Orthodox titles
Preceded by John XIII	Coptic Pope; 1525–1570	Succeeded by John XIV
