= Matthew of Alexandria =

Matthew of Alexandria may refer to:

- Various men who have held the title and name of Pope Matthew of Alexandria
- Patriarch Matthew of Alexandria, Greek Patriarch of Alexandria in 1746–1766
