= Patriarch Matthew II =

Patriarch Matthew II may refer to:

- Pope Matthew II of Alexandria (r. 1453–1466)
- Patriarch Matthew II of Constantinople (r. three times, shortly in 1596, from 1598 to 1602 and for a few days in 1603)
- Matthew II of Armenia (1845–1910), Patriarch and Catholicos of All Armenians
