= Matthew II =

Matthew II may refer to:

- Matthew II Csák (d. 1283/1284)
- Pope Matthew II of Alexandria (r. 1453–1466)
- Patriarch Matthew II of Constantinople (r. three times, shortly in 1596, from 1598 to 1602 and for a few days in 1603)
- Matthew II of Armenia (1845–1910), Catholicos of All Armenians

== See also ==
- Matthew 2
