= Pope Gabriel V of Alexandria =

Head of the Coptic Church from 1409 to 1427

- Pope of Alexandria and Patriarch of the See of St. Mark
- Papacy began: 1409
- Papacy ended: 1427
- Predecessor: Matthew
- Successor: John XI

Personal details
- Born: Egypt
- Died: 1427 Egypt
- Buried: Church of the Holy Virgin (Babylon El-Darag)
- Denomination: Coptic Orthodox Christian
- Residence: Church of the Virgin Mary (Haret Zuweila)

Pope Gabriel V of Alexandria, was the 88th Pope of Alexandria and Patriarch of the See of St. Mark.

Pope Gabriel was named by his predecessor Matthew I, before his death, hence he was selected for the papacy.

Preceded by Matthew I	Coptic Pope; 1408–1427	Succeeded by John XI
