= Pope John XI of Alexandria =

Head of the Coptic Church from 1427 to 1452

Pope John XI
- Pope of Alexandria and Patriarch of the See of St. Mark
- Papacy began: 11 May 1427
- Papacy ended: 4 May 1452
- Predecessor: Gabriel V
- Successor: Matthew II

Personal details
- Born: Farag El-Maksa, Cairo, Egypt
- Died: 4 May 1452 Egypt
- Buried: Khandaq Monastery of Saint Ruwais
- Denomination: Coptic Orthodox Christian
- Residence: Church of the Virgin Mary (Haret Zuweila)

Pope John XI of Alexandria was the 89th Pope of Alexandria and Patriarch of the See of St. Mark from 1427 to 1452.

Before his enthronement as Pope, his name was Farag. After his enthronement, he became known as John El-Maksi because he was from El-Maksa district in Cairo.

He was contemporary to Al-Ashraf Sayf-ad-Din Barsbay, Al-Aziz Jamal-ad-Din Yusuf, Az-Zahir Sayf-ad-Din Jaqmaq, and Al-Mansur Fakhr-ad-Din Uthman, the Burji sultans of Egypt. During his Papacy, the Copts encountered many hardships that the kings of Ethiopia threatened the Burji Mamluks to cut the flow of the Nile because of their persecution of the Christians. John XI was forbidden to communicate with the kings of Ethiopia and Nubia without the permission and knowledge of the sultans.

The first attempts to restore unity between the Catholic Church and the Coptic Orthodox Church took place in the mid-15th century when Pope Eugene IV of the Vatican sent a letter to Pope John XI of Alexandria inviting him to visit the Council of Florence. John XI accepted the invitation and sent a delegation representing his church, which included the heads of the monasteries of Saint Anthony and Saint Paul, along with several Coptic and Ethiopian monks. This delegation signed a unity agreement with the Catholic Church on February 4, 1442, but this agreement did not succeed due to the lack of sufficient support from the leaders of the Coptic Orthodox Church, who were reluctant to enter into a partnership with the Pope of Rome, fearing they would fall under his authority, despite the fact that the Pope of Rome was then sending an embassy every year to pay the jizya (Tax) for the poor Copts to the governor, through the knowledge of the Orthodox Patriarch of Egypt, to ensure that the labor of the church was not wasted for gold, which was coming from Rome to protect the Egyptian Christians.

John XI was enthroned on 16 Pashons, 1143 A.M. (May 11, 1427 A.D.). He occupied the Throne of Saint Mark for 24 years, 11 months, and 23 days. He departed on 9 Pashons, 1168 A.M. (May 4, 1452). He was buried in the tomb of the Monastery of El-Khandak. The Papal Throne remained vacant after his departure for 4 months and 6 days.

Oriental Orthodox titles
Preceded by Gabriel V	Coptic Pope; 1427–1452	Succeeded by Matthew II
