= Pope John XIII of Alexandria =

Head of the Coptic Church from 1484 to 1524

- Pope of Alexandria and Patriarch of the See of St. Mark
- Papacy began: 1484
- Papacy ended: 1524
- Predecessor: John XII
- Successor: Gabriel VII

Personal details
- Born: Egypt
- Died: 1524 Egypt
- Buried: Church of the Virgin Mary (Haret Zuweila)
- Denomination: Coptic Orthodox Christian
- Residence: Church of the Virgin Mary (Haret Zuweila)

Pope John XIII of Alexandria was the 94th Pope of Alexandria and Patriarch of the See of St. Mark from 1484 to 1524. Little is known of him except for his long reign of over forty years, and that his patriarchate witnessed the downfall of the Mamluk Sultanate and the rise of Ottoman power in Egypt.

Oriental Orthodox titles
Preceded by John XII	Coptic Pope; 1484–1524	Succeeded by Gabriel VII
