= Benjamin II =

Benjamin II may refer to:

- Pope Benjamin II of Alexandria, ruled in 1327–1339
- J. J. Benjamin (1818–1864), who used the pen name "Benjamin II"
