= John X (disambiguation) =

John X may refer to:

- Pope John X (r. 914–928)
- John X (archbishop of Ravenna) (r. 983–998)
- John X bar Shushan (r. 1063/1064–1072/1073)
- Pope John X of Alexandria (r. 1363–1369)
- John X of Antioch (Greek Orthodox, r. 2013–present)
- John X of Schleswig-Holstein-Gottorp

== See also ==
- John 10, the tenth chapter of the Gospel of John
