= Patriarch John X =

Patriarch John X may refer to:

- John X bar Mawdyono, Syriac Patriarch of Antioch in 1129–1137
- John X of Constantinople, Ecumenical Patriarch in 1198–1206
- Pope John X of Alexandria, Pope of Alexandria & Patriarch of the See of St. Mark in 1363–1369
- John X, 55th Maronite Patriarch in 1648–1656
- Patriarch John X of Antioch (ruled since 2012)
