= Pope Gabriel VI of Alexandria =

Head of the Coptic Church from 1466 to 1475

Pope Gabriel VI
- Pope of Alexandria and Patriarch of the See of St. Mark
- Papacy began: 9 February 1466
- Papacy ended: 15 December 1475
- Predecessor: Matthew II
- Successor: Michael VI

Personal details
- Born: Egypt
- Died: 15 December 1475 Egypt
- Buried: Church of Anba Ruways, Dayr al-Khandaq, Cairo
- Denomination: Coptic Orthodox Christian
- Residence: Church of the Virgin Mary (Haret Zuweila)

Pope Gabriel VI of Alexandria was the 91st Pope of Alexandria and Patriarch of the See of St. Mark from 9 February 1466 until his death on 15 December 1475.

Oriental Orthodox titles
Preceded by Matthew II	Coptic Pope; 1466–1475	Succeeded by Michael VI
