= Yousab El Abah =

Coptic Christian bishop, theologian and saint

Personal details
- Born: 1735 El Nikhela, Assiut Governorate, Egypt
- Died: 24 January 1826 (aged 90–91)

Yousab El Abah (يوساب الأبح), also known as Joseph el-Abbah ("Yousab the Hoarse"), originally called Yousef (1735 – 24 January 1826), was a Coptic Christian bishop, theologian and saint. His body is kept in the Monastery of Saint Anthony in the Eastern Desert.

== Early life ==
El Abah was born in the village of El Nikhela in the Assiut Governorate, Egypt.

== Career ==
He was drawn to the monastic life and entered the Monastery of St. Anthony at age 25 in 1760. He took the name Yousef el Antony and lived a life of asceticism and worship. El Abah was fond of reading, as he was very keen on studying and researching manuscripts. He was later recognized as a pastor, then as a bishop.

In 1790, Pope John XVIII, the Patriarch of Alexandria, took him in as his disciple and personal secretary.

In 1791, he was appointed Bishop of Girga and Akhmim; known as Anba Yousab.

He was interested in teaching about life, preaching, and writing educational articles such as those from his books, The Weapon of The Believer and Stair Book.

During the papacy of John, Pope Pius VI of Rome attempted to attract the Eastern Churches to Roman Catholicism. Thus, he published the proceedings of the Council of Chalcedon and distributed it in all the countries of the East. He also sent an envoy to Pope John XVIII of Alexandria, asking him to unite with the Roman Catholic Church. As a famous scholar and theologian, Yousab was asked to respond to the message, refuting its claims and defending the Non-Chalcedonian Position.

He was buried at St Anthony Monastery; his vestments are also held there.

His feast day is 17 Touba (25 January).
