= Pope John VII of Alexandria =

Head of the Coptic Church variously from 1262 to 1293

- Pope of Alexandria and Patriarch of the See of St. Mark
- Papacy began: 1262 & 1271
- Papacy ended: 1268 & 1293
- Predecessor: Athanasius III (first reign); Gabriel III (second reign)
- Successor: Gabriel III (first reign); Theodosius III (second reign)

Personal details
- Born: Egypt
- Died: 21 April 1293 Egypt
- Buried: Saint Mercurius Church in Coptic Cairo
- Denomination: Coptic Orthodox Christian
- Residence: The Hanging Church

Pope John VII of Alexandria was the 77th Pope of Alexandria and Patriarch of the See of St. Mark from 1262 to 1268 and again from 1271 to 1293.

With support from some of the bishops, Pope John VII was replaced for three years by Pope Gabriel III, who was originally one of the candidates for the post. He was restored as pope after the death of Gabriel III. This is the only occasion in history when the Coptic Orthodox Church had a pope that reigned twice.

Religious titles
Preceded by Athanasius III	Coptic Pope; 1262–1268	Succeeded by Gabriel III
Preceded by Gabriel III	Coptic Pope; 1271–1293	Succeeded by Theodosius III
