= Pope Theodosius III of Alexandria =

Head of the Coptic Church from 1293 to 1300

Pope Theodosius III
- Pope of Alexandria and Patriarch of the See of St. Mark
- Papacy began: 1294
- Papacy ended: 1300
- Predecessor: John VII
- Successor: John VIII

Personal details
- Born: ‘Abd al-Masih Egypt
- Died: 1300 Egypt
- Buried: Dayr Al-Nastur
- Denomination: Coptic Orthodox Christian
- Residence: The Hanging Church

Pope Theodosios III of Alexandria (born ‘Abd al-Masih; died 1300), or Theodosios II, was the 79th pope of Alexandria and patriarch of the See of St. Mark from 1294 to 1300. He was buried in the former Nestorian monastery of Dayr Al-Nastur.

== Professional life ==
He was a monk at the Monastery of Saint Fana.

Religious titles
Preceded by John VII	Coptic Pope; 1294–1300	Succeeded by John VIII
