= Pope John XII of Alexandria =

Head of the Coptic Church from 1480 to 1483

Pope John XII
- Pope of Alexandria and Patriarch of the See of St. Mark
- Papacy began: 1479/1480
- Papacy ended: 1482/1483
- Predecessor: Michael VI
- Successor: John XIII

Personal details
- Born: Egypt
- Died: 1483 Egypt
- Buried: Church of the Holy Virgin (Babylon El-Darag)
- Denomination: Coptic Orthodox Christian
- Residence: Church of the Virgin Mary (Haret Zuweila)

Pope John XII of Alexandria was the 93rd Pope of Alexandria and Patriarch of the See of St. Mark from 1479/1480 to 1482/1483.

Oriental Orthodox titles
Preceded by Michael VI	Coptic Pope; 1479/1480–1482/1483	Succeeded by John XIII
