= Pope Michael II of Alexandria =

Head of the Coptic Church from 849 to 851

Saint Michael II of Alexandria
- Pope of Alexandria and Patriarch of the See of St. Mark
- Papacy began: 20 November 849
- Papacy ended: 17 April 851
- Predecessor: Joseph
- Successor: Cosmas II

Personal details
- Born: Egypt
- Died: 17 April 851
- Buried: Monastery of Saint Macarius the Great
- Denomination: Coptic Orthodox Christian
- Residence: Saint Mark's Church

Sainthood
- Feast day: 17 April (22 Baramouda in the Coptic calendar)

Pope Michael II of Alexandria (Abba Khail II), was the 53rd Pope of Alexandria and Patriarch of the See of St. Mark.

Preceded by Joseph I	Coptic Pope; 849–851	Succeeded by Cosmas II
