= Saint Mary Church (Haret Elroum) =

Saint Mary Coptic Orthodox Church
- ϯⲉⲕⲕⲗⲏⲥⲓⲁ ⲛ̀ϯⲑⲉⲟⲇⲟⲕⲟⲥ ⲉⲑ̅ⲩ̅ ⲙⲁⲣⲓⲁ ⲛ̀ϯⲣⲁⲃⲏ ⲛ̀ⲣⲱⲙⲉⲟⲥ
- Saint Mary Coptic Orthodox Church
- 30.0433°N 31.2608°E
- Location: Haret Elroum, Cairo
- Country: Egypt
- Denomination: Coptic Orthodox Church

History
- Founded: 10th century
- Dedication: Mary, mother of Jesus
- Dedicated: 10th century

Architecture
- Architectural type: Church
- Style: Coptic

Administration
- Division: The Coptic Orthodox Patriarchate

Clergy
- Bishop: Pope Tawadros II

Saint Mary Coptic Orthodox Church in Haret el-Roum (Coptic: ϯⲉⲕⲕⲗⲏⲥⲓⲁ ⲛ̀ϯⲑⲉⲟⲇⲟⲕⲟⲥ ⲉⲑ̅ⲩ̅ ⲙⲁⲣⲓⲁ ⲛ̀ϯⲣⲁⲃⲏ ⲛ̀ⲣⲱⲙⲉⲟⲥ, lit. 'The Church of Holy Mother of God in the Roman Quarter') or the Church of the Virgin of Relief (Arabic: كنيسة العذراء المغيثة, romanized: Kanīsat al-ʿAdhrāʾ al-Mughītha) is a Coptic Orthodox church in al-Ghūrīya, Cairo near the Convent of Saint Theodore.

From 1660 to 1800 the church was the Seat of the Coptic Orthodox Pope of Alexandria. In 1660 Pope Matthew IV of Alexandria transferred the seat from Ḥārat Zūwayla to Ḥārat al-Rūm, where it remained until 1800 when Pope Mark VIII transferred the patriarchal seat to Saint Mark's Coptic Orthodox Cathedral, Azbakeya.

== Importance ==
Saint Mary Church grew in importance as the centre of the Coptic Church. Several Coptic Popes are buried in the church.

== History ==
The church was rebuilt several times, and in 1794 Ibrahim El-Gohary renovated the church. It was damaged by fire during the reign of Pope Mark VIII (1797–1809) but was restored and rebuilt.

== See also ==
- Christian Egypt
- List of Coptic Orthodox churches in Egypt
