= Pope Shenouda I of Alexandria =

Head of the Coptic Church from 859 to 880

- Pope of Alexandria and Patriarch of the See of St. Mark
- Papacy began: 8 January 859
- Papacy ended: 19 April 880
- Predecessor: Cosmas II
- Successor: Michael III

Personal details
- Born: Samanoud, Egypt
- Died: 19 April 880
- Buried: Saint Mark's Church
- Denomination: Coptic Orthodox Christian
- Residence: Saint Mark's Church

Pope Shenouda I of Alexandria was the 55th Coptic Pope of Alexandria and Patriarch of the See of St. Mark (859–880). He is commemorated in the Coptic Synaxarion on the 1st day of Baramudah. Prior to his election, he had been oikonomos of the Monastery of St Macarius - one of his early acts as patriarch was the improve the freshwater supply to Alexandria. He was described as a model of monastic humility who prayed regularly for the forgiveness of his enemies.

Shenouda I was elected during the final days of the rule of the 10th Abbasid caliph, al-Mutawakkil, who was killed by a Turkic guard on orders by his son. His son and successor, Al-Muntasir, appointed a finance minister who doubled taxes, cancelled exemptions on religious minorities, and devised new ways of extorting wealth from subjects. Shenouda I intermittently went into hiding and conferred with bishops as how to pay the increased taxes. However, the same grievances were shared throughout the caliphate and a rebellion against al-Muntasir and his officers led to the end of his reign. Following this, monasteries in Upper Egypt were destroyed by the Berbers and the Bedouins. As a result, Pope Shenouda I built walls around the monasteries of the Nitrian Desert. Their height varies between ten and eleven meters, and their widths are about two meters. They were also covered with a thick layer of plaster.

Shenouda I spent much of his early days as patriarch dealing with internal religious disagreements that verged on heresies, i.e. teachers claimed that the Resurrection of Jesus took place on 11 April instead of on 25 March, bishops teaching that the Nature of the Divinity had died, etc. It was suggested that the spread of false teachings among the Copts was because "the scantiness of the knowledge of their shepherds (the bishops) was manifest in those days".

Religious titles
Preceded by Cosmas II	Coptic Pope; 859–880	Succeeded by Michael III
