= Geoffrey of Paris =

French historian and writer

Geoffrey of Paris (Geoffroy de Paris; died c. 1320), French chronicler, was probably the author of the Chronique metrique de Philippe le Bel, or Chronique rimée de Geoffroi de Paris. This work, which deals with the history of France from 1300 to 1316, contains 7,918 verses, and is valuable as that of a writer who had a personal knowledge of many of the events which he relates. Various short historical poems have also been attributed to Geoffrey, but there is no certain information about either his life or his writings.

He also wrote several Latin and French dits between 1314 and 1318, among which Avisemens pour le roy Loys, Du roy Phelippe qui ores regne, De alliatis and De la creation du pape Jehan. The majority of his writings address contemporary political issues and are directed to the kings of France Louis X and Philippe V.
