= Pope John XIV of Alexandria =

Head of the Coptic Church from 1571 to 1586

Pope John XIV
- Pope of Alexandria and Patriarch of the See of St. Mark
- Papacy began: 17 April 1571
- Papacy ended: 6 September 1586
- Predecessor: Gabriel VII
- Successor: Gabriel VIII

Personal details
- Born: Shenouda Manfalout, Egypt
- Died: 6 September 1586 Egypt
- Denomination: Coptic Orthodox Christian
- Residence: Church of the Virgin Mary (Haret Zuweila)

Sainthood
- Feast day: 6 September (3 Nasie in the Coptic Calendar)

Pope John XIV of Alexandria was the 96th Pope of Alexandria and Patriarch of the See of St. Mark from 1570/1571 to 1585/1586.

He joined the Paromeos Monastery in the Nitrian Desert before becoming a Pope.

Oriental Orthodox titles
Preceded by Gabriel VII	Coptic Pope; 1570/1571–1585/1586	Succeeded by Gabriel VIII
