= Pope Matthew I of Alexandria =

Head of the Coptic Church from 1378 to 1408

Saint Matthew I of Alexandria
- Pope of Alexandria and Patriarch of the See of St. Mark
- Papacy began: 1378
- Papacy ended: 1408
- Predecessor: Gabriel IV
- Successor: Gabriel V

Personal details
- Born: Egypt
- Died: 1408 Egypt
- Buried: Khandaq Monastery of Saint Ruwais
- Denomination: Coptic Orthodox Christian
- Residence: Saint Mercurius Church in Coptic Cairo

Sainthood
- Feast day: (Coptic calendar)

Papal styles of Saint Matthew
- Reference style: His Holiness
- Spoken style: Your Holiness
- Religious style: Pope and Patriarch
- Posthumous style: Saint

Pope Matthew I of Alexandria (or Matheos) was the Coptic Pope of Alexandria and Patriarch of the See of St. Mark from 1378 to 1408. He is revered as a saint by the Coptic Church.

== Early life ==
As a young boy, Matthew was a shepherd tending his fathers sheep. When he was fourteen he joined a monastery.

== Priesthood ==
He was ordained as a priest at the age of eighteen. At which time he left for the St. Anthony's monastery then to Palestine, and worked in construction. Upon hearing of the persecution of Copts because of the actions of the Crusaders, he returned to St. Anthony's Monastery. At that time he was appointed abbot of the monastery.

Shortly after his ordination, Prince Yalpogha led the monks and their abbot in humility through the streets of Cairo in an attempt to convince the prince and the authorities that the Crusaders' actions were unconnected to the Copts. The Crusaders' sack of Alexandria roused the ruling prince and his men against the local Christians (including) Copts. Afterwards, Matthew left for Al-Muharraq monastery. Matthew was also a monk at the Monastery of Saint Fana.

== Coptic Pope ==
On the death of Gabriel IV Patriarch of Alexandria (1378), Father Matheos was elected be the next patriarch, he solicited the council of the elders of St. Anthony's monastery, and accepted their decision. Escorted to Alexandria, he was consecrated as Pope, and gave himself the title El Meskin ("The Poor").

Pope Matthew was known for his charitable work with the poor.

== Relations with ruler ==
Through his cordial relation with Sultan Barquq, he was able to stop the mob from burning Al-Muallaqa church and the Shahran monastery, because the Muslims were claiming that new constructions were taking place in those two locations. The Sultan appointed four Judges of Islam who declared the falsehood of such claims.

The situation worsened when two Mamlur princes exiled Sultan Barquq, and took his place. Mentach and Yalpogha persecuted the Copts and their Pope.

One of the Mamluks, by the name Gamal-El-Din, also persecuted the Christians. He imposed a tribute of five hundred thousand dinars.

Preceded by Gabriel IV	Coptic Pope; 1378–1408	Succeeded by Gabriel V
