= Pope Gabriel III of Alexandria =

Head of the Coptic Church from 1268 to 1271

Pope Gabriel III
- Pope of Alexandria and Patriarch of the See of St. Mark
- Papacy began: 1268
- Papacy ended: 1271
- Predecessor: John VII
- Successor: John VII

Personal details
- Born: al-Rashīd Farajallāh; 20 October 1208 Egypt
- Died: 5 July 1274 (aged 65) Egypt
- Buried: Church of St. Mercurius
- Denomination: Coptic Orthodox Christian
- Residence: The Hanging Church

Pope Gabriel III of Alexandria (born al-Rashīd Farajallāh; 20 October 1208 – 5 July 1274) was the 78th Pope of Alexandria and Patriarch of the See of St. Mark from 1268 to 1271.

He was originally one of the candidates for the Papal post when Pope John VII was elected. With support from some of the Bishops, Gabriel III replaced John VII and reigned for three years until his death, when John VII was reinstated. This is the only occasion in history when the Coptic Orthodox Church had a pope that reigned twice.

Gabriel III died on 5 July 1274 and was buried at the Church of St. Mercurius in Cairo.

Religious titles
Preceded by John VII	Coptic Pope; 1268–1271	Succeeded by John VII
