= Saint Karas =

Coptic saint

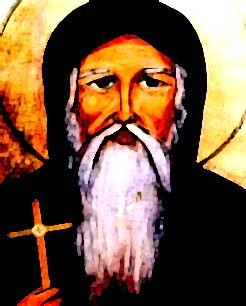
Saint Karas

Cyrus the Anchorite, also known as Apa Kyros (Coptic: ⲁⲡⲁ ⲕⲩⲣⲟⲥ) and Anba Karas (Arabic: أنبا كاراس), was a saint of the Coptic Orthodox Church who lived during the late fifth and early sixth centuries.

According to his life, written by the Coptic monk Pambo (Coptic: ⲡⲁⲙⲃⲱ, romanized: Pambō), and translated from the Syrian Monastery manuscripts by Archdeacon Aziz Nashed, he spent 57 years in isolation in the Scetis Desert in communion with God who visited him every day in his cave.
