= Pope Cosmas II of Alexandria =

Head of the Coptic Church from 851 to 858

Saint Cosmas II of Alexandria
- Pope of Alexandria and Patriarch of the See of St. Mark
- Papacy began: 851
- Papacy ended: 30 November 858
- Predecessor: Michael II
- Successor: Shenouda I

Personal details
- Born: Samanoud, Egypt
- Died: 30 November 858
- Buried: Church of St. Bartholomew, Danush, Egypt
- Denomination: Coptic Orthodox Christian
- Residence: Saint Mark's Church

Sainthood
- Feast day: 30 November (21 Hathor in the Coptic calendar)

Pope Cosmas II of Alexandria was the Coptic Pope of Alexandria and Patriarch of the See of St. Mark from the years (851–858).

Preceded by Michael II	Coptic Pope; 851–858	Succeeded by Shenouda I
