= Pope John IX of Alexandria =

Head of the Coptic Church from 1320 to 1327

Pope John IX
- Pope of Alexandria and Patriarch of the See of St. Mark
- Church: Coptic Orthodox Church of Alexandria
- Papacy began: 1320
- Papacy ended: 29 March 1327
- Predecessor: John VIII
- Successor: Benjamin II

Personal details
- Born: Nephia-Monufia Governorate, Egypt
- Died: 29 March 1327 Egypt
- Buried: Nastur Monastery
- Denomination: Coptic Orthodox Christian
- Residence: Saint Mercurius Church in Coptic Cairo

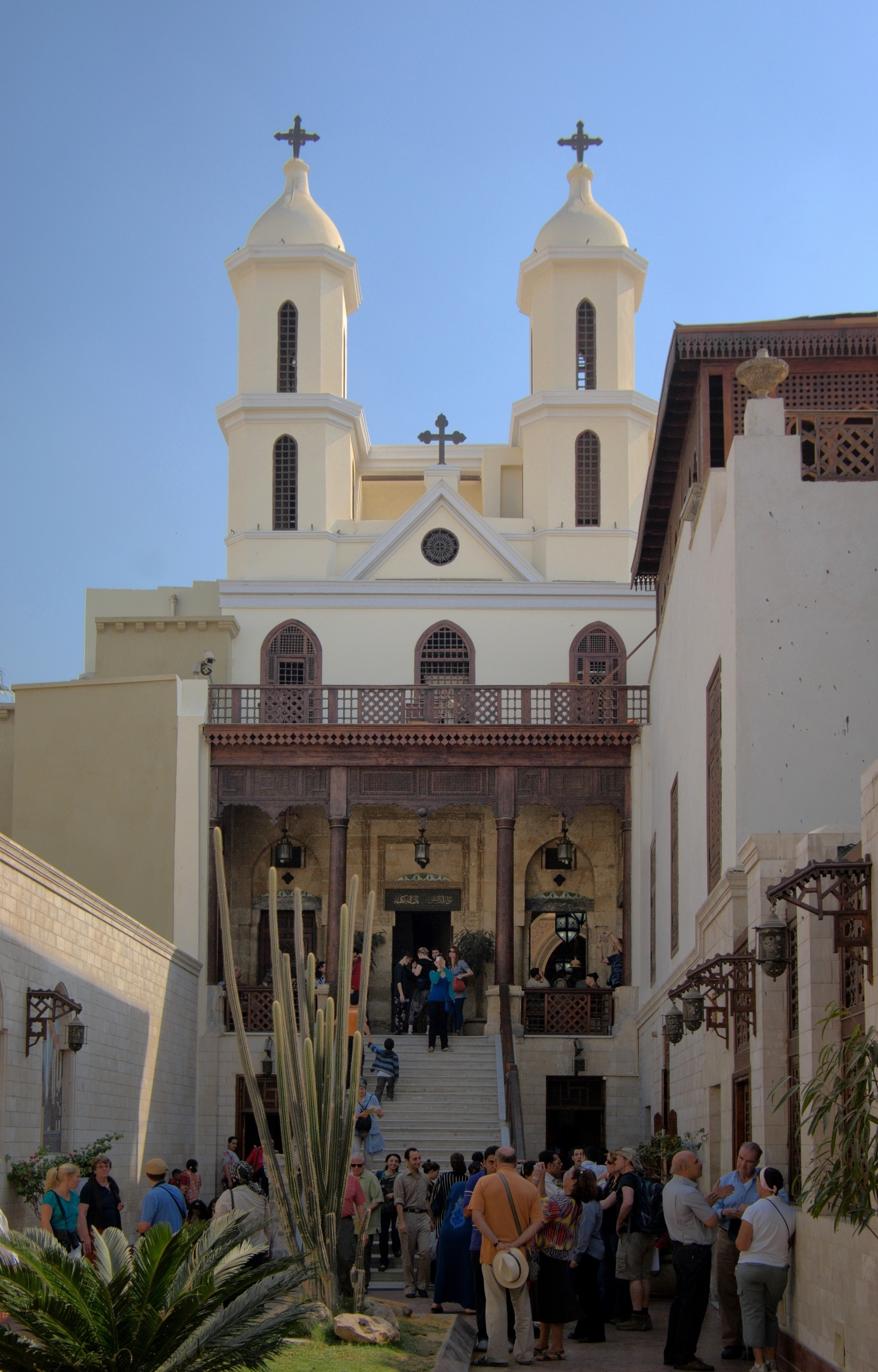
The "Hanging Church" in Cairo

Pope John IX of Alexandria (Died 29 March 1327) was the 81st Pope of Alexandria and Patriarch of the See of St. Mark from 1320 to 1327.

Oriental Orthodox titles
| Preceded by John VIII | Coptic Pope; 1320–1327 | Succeeded by Benjamin II |
