= Girga =

Girga ⲑⲁⲣϫⲉ جرجا
- City
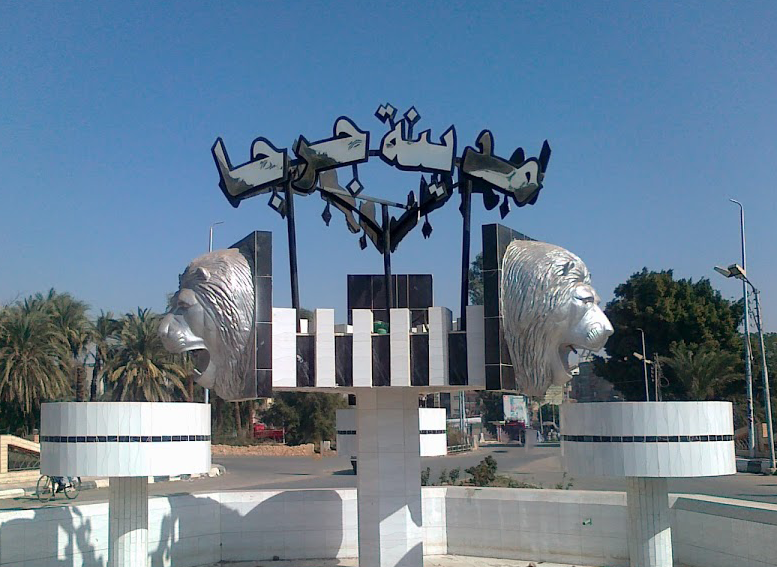
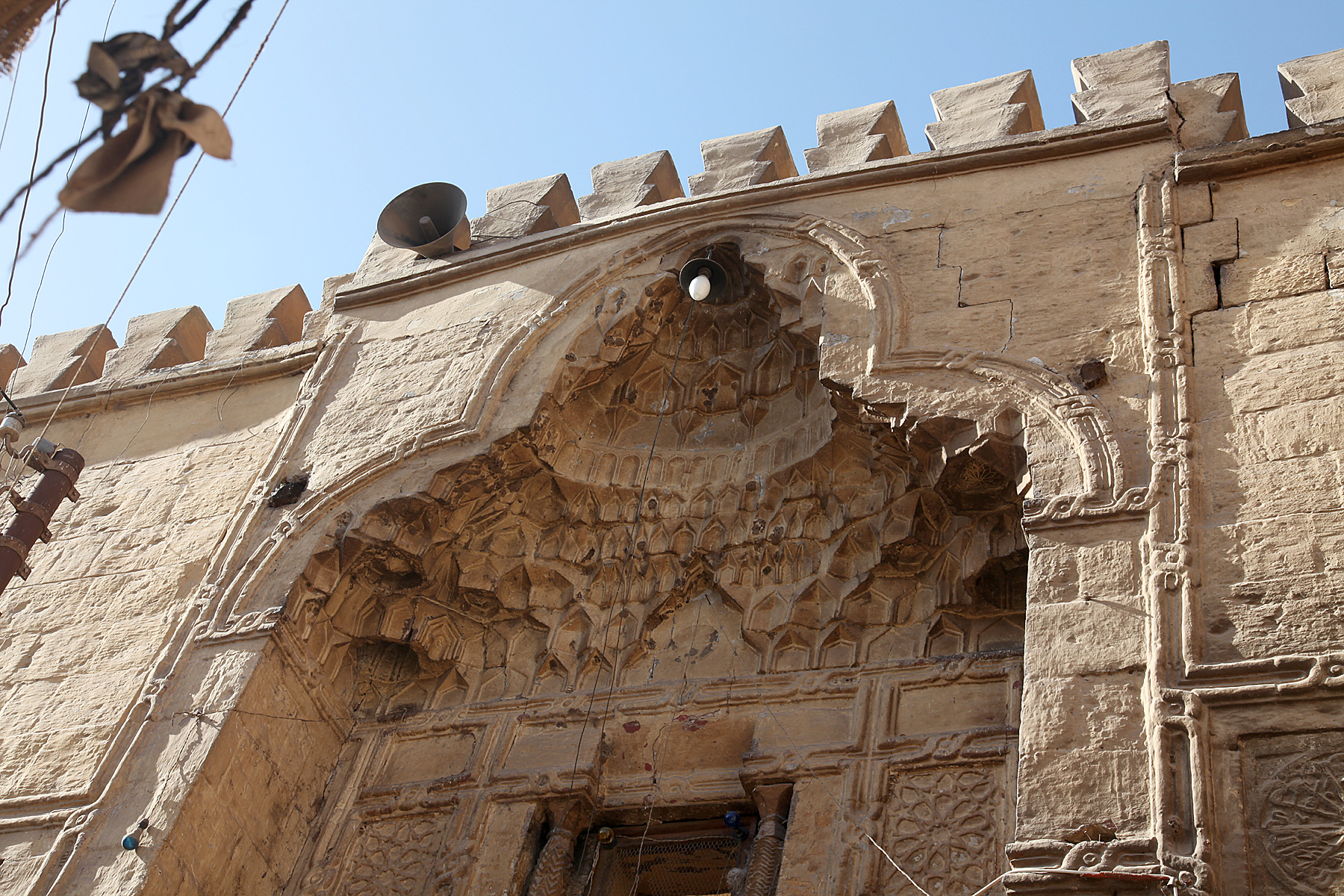
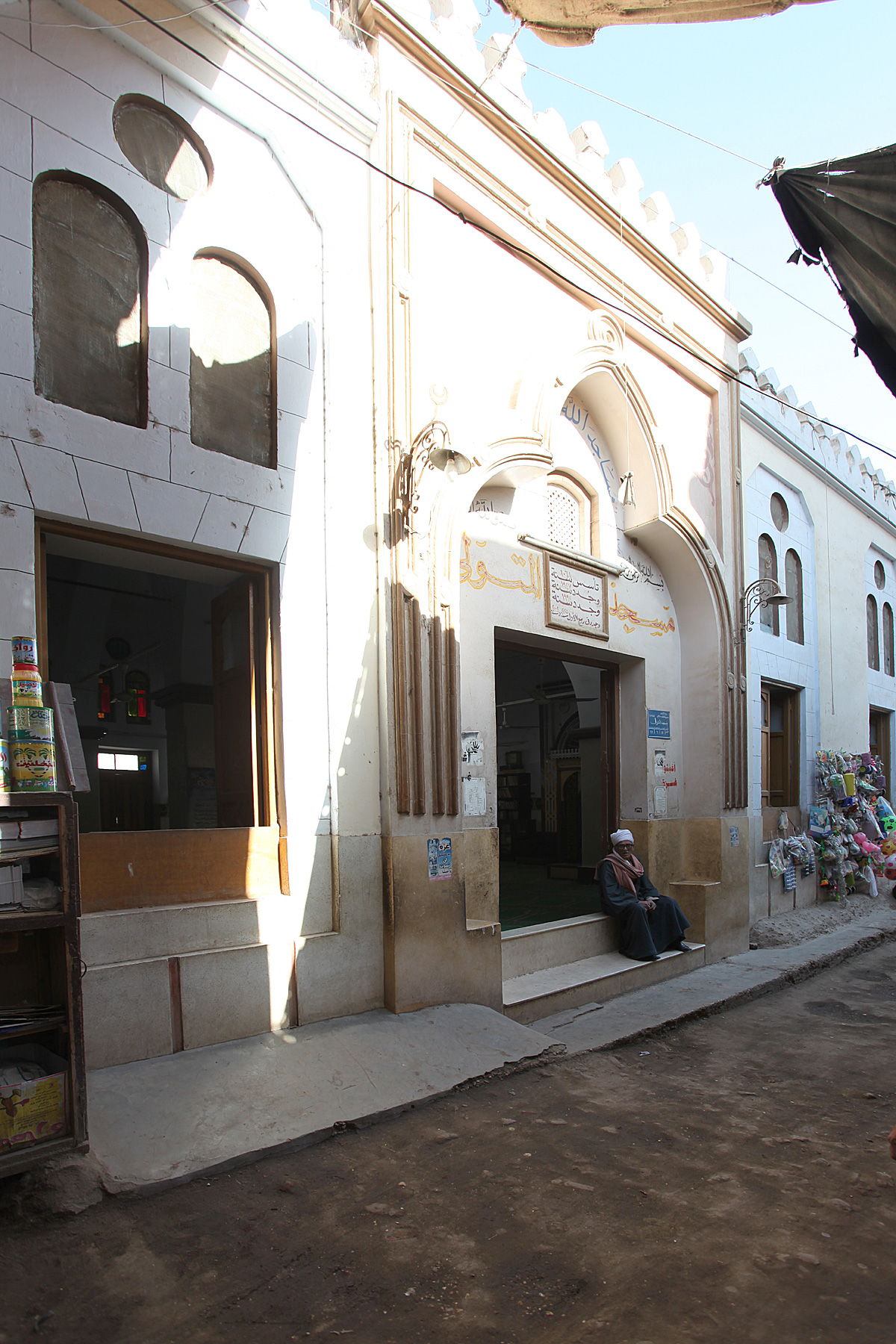
- Top-bottom, left-right: Girga city entrance, Girga school, Uthman Bey Mosque Entrance, Girga Palace, and Mitwalli Mosque Entrance.

- Location in Egypt
- Coordinates: 26°20′N 31°54′E
- Country: Egypt
- Governorate: Sohag
- Established: 3273 BC

Area
  - Total: 5.42 sq mi (14.05 km^{2})
- Elevation: 230 ft (70 m)

Population (2021)
  - Total: 162,165
  - Density: 29,890/sq mi (11,540/km^{2})
- Time zone: UTC+2 (EET)
  - Summer (DST): UTC+3 (EEST)

Girga (Egyptian Arabic: جرجا, romanized: Girgā, [ˈɡeɾɡæ]), alternatively Digirga, Digurga or Jirjā is a city in the Sohag Governorate of Upper Egypt located on the west bank of the Nile. It is the metropolitan see of the Coptic Orthodox Church, and is the oldest continuously-inhabited city on the African continent (late 4th millennium BC).

== Name ==
U17 O49
grg
in hieroglyphs

The name of the city comes from Ancient Egyptian: (tꜣ)-grg.t, lit. 'the settlement', which is also preserved in possibly corrupted Coptic: ⲑⲁⲣϫⲉ, romanized: tarje and its alternative name Digirga.

Some Egyptologists such as Brugsch believe that the name of the city derives from the ancient Egyptian word grg miri-amoun Ramessou which means "The establishment of Ramesses II", although Daressy and Budge identify the name with Coptic Balyana near Abydos.

Through folk etymology the city became associated with St. George and a now non-existent monastery dedicated to him nearby, hence Leo Africanus calls it Giorgia and Peust suggests an older vocalisation Gurga.

== Overview ==
Girga was the capital of the Girga Governorate until 1960, when the capital was moved to Sohag and the name of the governorate changed accordingly. Girga has an estimated population of 71,564 (as of 1986) and has various economic industries which include cane sugar manufacturing and pottery.

== History ==
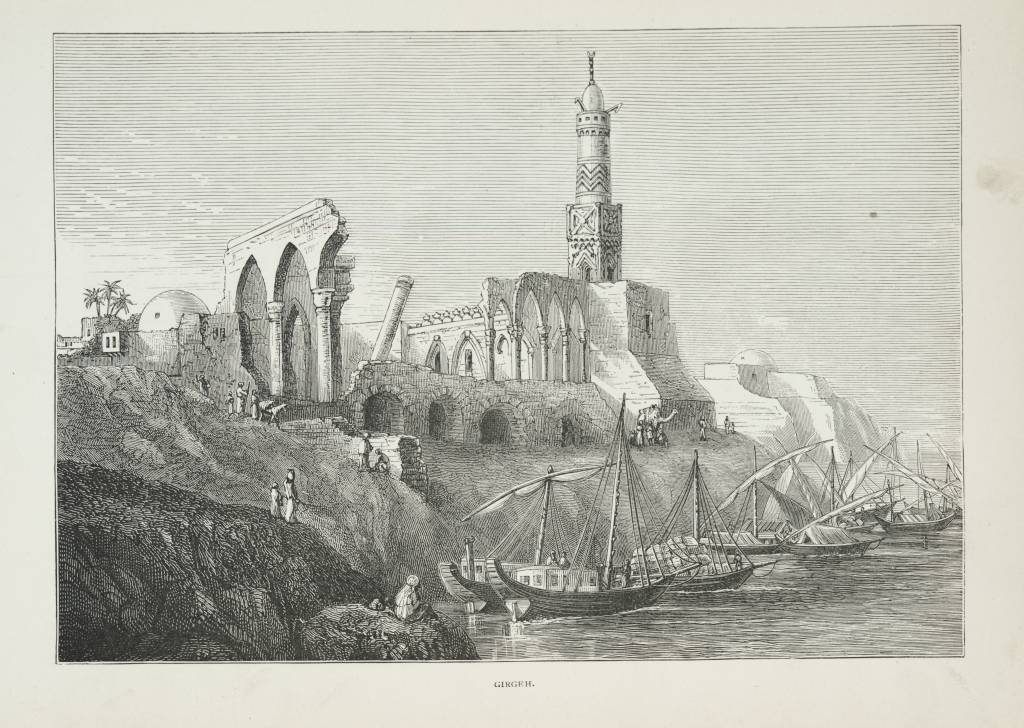
Girga in 1890

The city might have been the location of the ancient city of Thinis (Greek name; also spelled This) – the first capital city of unified Egypt under Narmer. As of 2025, it remains inconclusive whether Girga or nearby village of Birba is the site of Thinis (Birba was confirmed to be the site of the capital of Egypt during the 1st and 2nd dynasties).

There are ancient sites located on the territory of Girga including Beit Khallaf, a necropolis with mudbrick tombs dating back to the 3rd dynasty.

Girga was the capital of Upper Egypt during Ottoman rule.

In 1791, Saint Yousab El Abah (also Joseph el-Abbah) was the bishop of the city.

In 1907 Girga had a population of 19,893, of whom about one-third were Copts.

As late as the middle of the 18th century, the town stood about 0.4 km from the river, but by the beginning of the 20th century it stood on the bank, the intervening space having been washed away, together with a large part of the town, by the stream continually encroaching on its left bank.

== Places of worship ==
=== Mosques ===
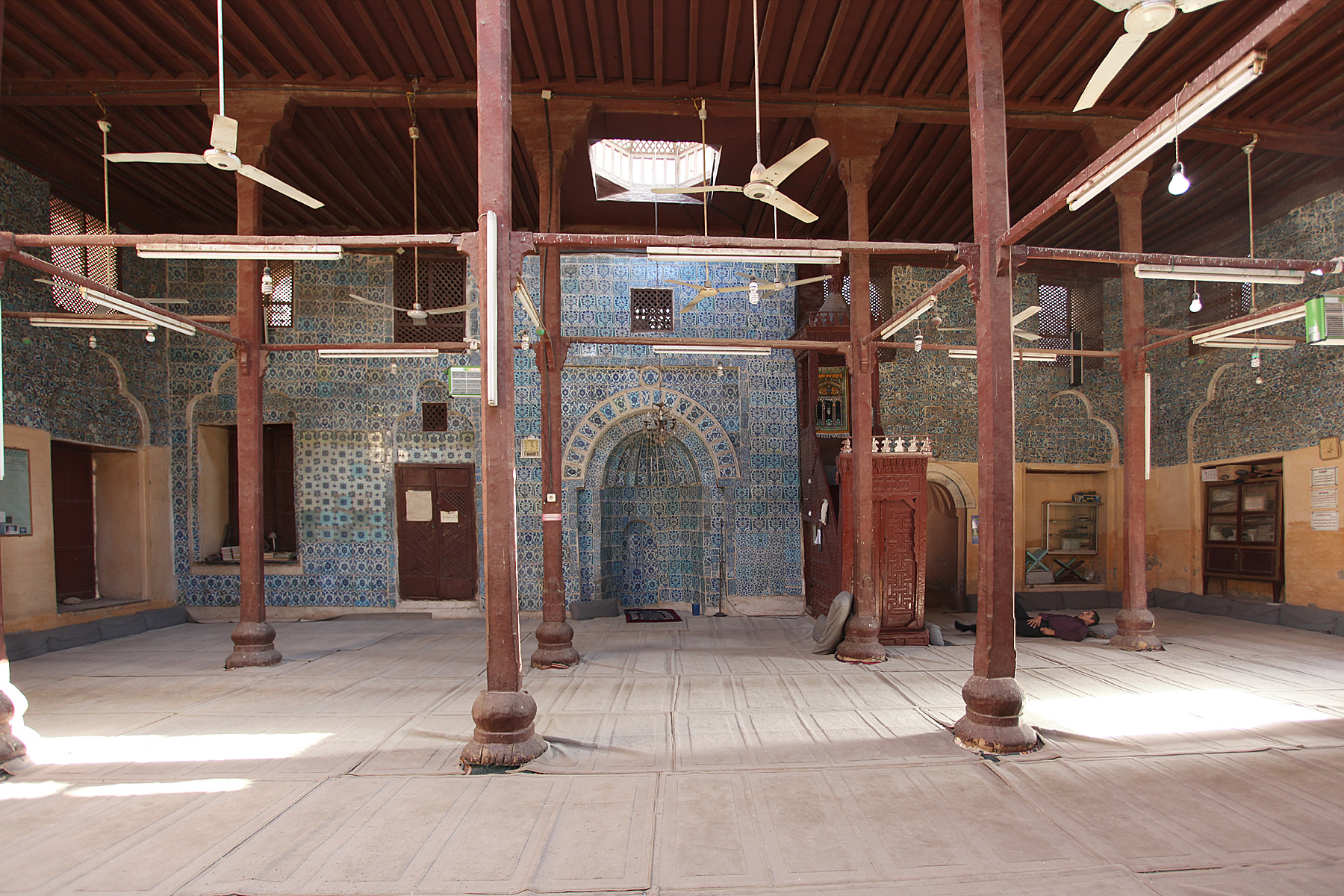
Chinese Mosque

- Chinese Mosque (Arabic: المسجد الصينى, romanized: almasjid assini): The mosque was presumably built in about 1150 AH (= 1737) in the historical district of al-Qaysariyya by Muhammad bey al-Faqari who became a governor in 1117 AH (= 1705/1706) in Ottoman times. Although it is called Chinese, no materials imported from China were used in its construction, and it got its name after porcelain used in its decoration. In fact, tiles (çini in Turkish) were very popular in mosque architecture. “Chinese” and "Çini" is derived from the Persian word Chīnī (چینی), which means 'Chinese porcelain' and was especially used to refer to Chinese porcelain.
- Osman Bey Mosque (Arabic: مسجد عثمان بك)
- Al-Fuqara Mosque (Arabic: مسجد الفقراء)
- Jalal Bey Mosque (Arabic: مسجد جلال بك)
- Al-Mitwalli Mosque (Arabic: جامع المتولي)

=== Churches and monasteries ===
- Monastery of Archangel Michael (Arabic: دير الملاك ميخائيل, romanized: dayr al-malak mikhail): Situated on the right bank of the Nile opposite of Girga. Since 1910 this site has been celebrated among archaeologists, because the discoveries made there have shed light on the region's prehistory.
- Church of Archangel Michael (Arabic: كنيسة الملاك ميخائيل, romanized: kenisa al-malak mikhail)
- Church of Saint George (Arabic: كنيسة مارجرجس, romanized: kenisa mar jirjis)
- Church of Theodore Tiron (Arabic: كنيسة الأمير تادرس, romanized: kenisa alamir tadrus)
- church of virgin Mary

== Climate ==
Köppen-Geiger climate classification system classifies its climate as hot desert (BWh).

Climate data for Girga
Month	Jan	Feb	Mar	Apr	May	Jun	Jul	Aug	Sep	Oct	Nov	Dec	Year
Mean daily maximum °C (°F)	22.3 (72.1)	24.3 (75.7)	28.1 (82.6)	33.5 (92.3)	36.9 (98.4)	38.3 (100.9)	37.9 (100.2)	38.1 (100.6)	34.9 (94.8)	32.4 (90.3)	28.8 (83.8)	23.8 (74.8)	31.6 (88.9)
Daily mean °C (°F)	13.7 (56.7)	15.3 (59.5)	18.7 (65.7)	23.9 (75.0)	27.8 (82.0)	29.5 (85.1)	29.5 (85.1)	29.9 (85.8)	27.7 (81.9)	25.1 (77.2)	20.4 (68.7)	15.5 (59.9)	23.1 (73.6)
Mean daily minimum °C (°F)	5.1 (41.2)	6.1 (43.0)	9.4 (48.9)	14.3 (57.7)	18.7 (65.7)	20.8 (69.4)	21.2 (70.2)	21.8 (71.2)	20.5 (68.9)	17.9 (64.2)	12.2 (54.0)	7.3 (45.1)	14.6 (58.3)
Average precipitation mm (inches)	0 (0)	0 (0)	0 (0)	0 (0)	0 (0)	0 (0)	0 (0)	0 (0)	0 (0)	0 (0)	0 (0)	1 (0.0)	1 (0)
Source: Climate-Data.org

== See also ==
- Thinis
- List of cities in Egypt
