= Pope John X of Alexandria =

Head of the Coptic Church from 1363 to 1369

- Pope of Alexandria and Patriarch of the See of St. Mark
- Papacy began: 7 May 1363
- Papacy ended: 13 July 1369
- Predecessor: Mark IV
- Successor: Gabriel IV

Personal details
- Born: Damascus, Syria
- Died: 13 July 1369 Egypt
- Buried: The Hanging Church
- Denomination: Coptic Orthodox Christian
- Residence: Saint Mercurius Church in Coptic Cairo

Pope John X of Alexandria (Abba Yoannis X) was the 85th Pope of Alexandria and Patriarch of the See of St. Mark.

John was known by El-Mo'ataman the Syrian, and he was from Damascus, Syria. He was a righteous and knowledgeable man. He was enthroned on the 12th of Pashons in the Coptic calendar (May 7, 1363 AD). He remained on the throne for six years, two months, and seven days. He was buried at Saint Mercurius Church in Coptic Cairo beside Simon the Tanner.

Preceded by Mark IV	Coptic Pope; 1363–1369	Succeeded by Gabriel IV
