= Saint Mark's Coptic Orthodox Cathedral, Azbakeya =

Saint Mark Coptic Orthodox Cathedral
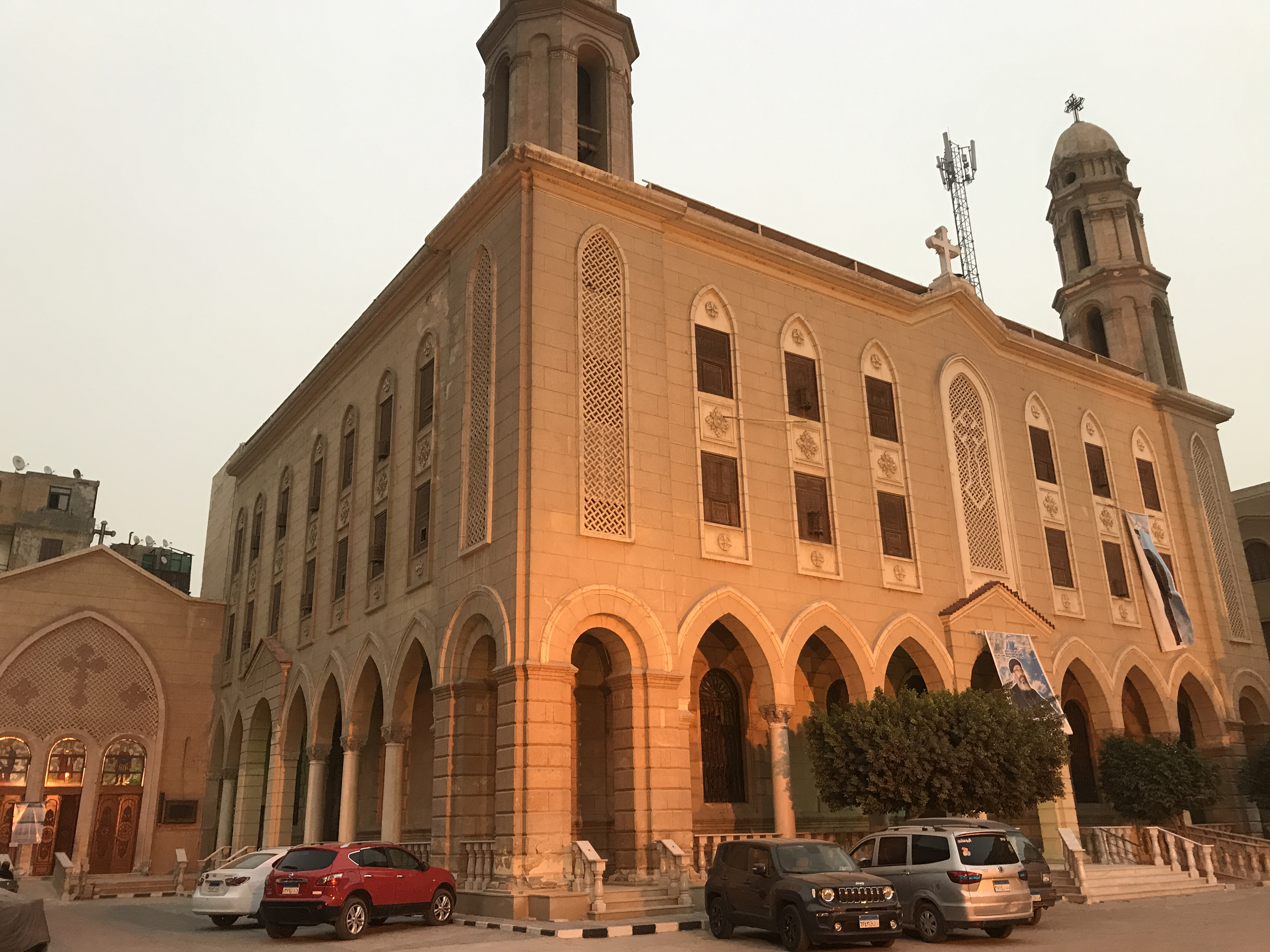
- Saint Mark Coptic Orthodox Cathedral
- 30.0569°N 31.2489°E
- Location: Azbakeya, Cairo
- Country: Egypt
- Denomination: Coptic Orthodox Church

History
- Founder: Pope Mark VIII of Alexandria
- Dedication: Saint Mark
- Consecrated: 1800

Architecture
- Architectural type: church
- Style: Coptic

Administration
- Division: The Coptic Orthodox Patriarchate

Clergy
- Bishop: Pope Tawadros II
- Priest: Abouna Makary Younan

Saint Mark's Coptic Orthodox Cathedral is a Coptic Orthodox church in Azbakeya, Cairo, Egypt. It was the seat of the Coptic Pope from 1800 to 1971.

Due to Ibrahim El-Gohary's influential position in the government and his great favor to the Muslim rulers, he was able to issue fatwas that permitted the Copts to rebuild the destroyed churches and monasteries.

This was of particular importance because the Copts were not allowed to build new churches or to repair old ones unless they got official government approval, which was rarely granted.

One of these churches that he built is Saint Mark's Coptic Orthodox Cathedral in Azbakeya in Cairo, which his brother completed and which was inaugurated by Pope Mark VIII in 1800.

Ibrahim El-Gohary also donated many endowments of good land and money for the reconstruction, amounting to 238 endowments as documented in the Coptic Orthodox Patriarchate.

The cathedral served as the seat of the Coptic Orthodox Pope of Alexandria between 1800 and 1971, after which it moved to Saint Mark's Coptic Orthodox Cathedral in the Abbassia district.
