= Pope Matthew II of Alexandria =

Head of the Coptic Church from 1452 to 1465

- Pope of Alexandria and Patriarch of the See of St. Mark
- Papacy began: 1452
- Papacy ended: 23 September 1465
- Predecessor: John XI
- Successor: Gabriel VI

Personal details
- Born: Egypt
- Died: 23 September 1465 Egypt
- Buried: Khandaq Monastery of Saint Ruwais
- Denomination: Coptic Orthodox Christian
- Residence: Church of the Virgin Mary (Haret Zuweila)

Pope Matthew (Matthias) the Second was the 90th Pope of Alexandria and Patriarch of the See of St. Mark. He became a monk in El-Muharraq Monastery and later was Coptic Pope for thirteen years. He is commemorated in the Calendar of Saints of the Coptic Church on the 13th day of Thout.

Religious titles
Preceded by John XI	Coptic Pope; 1453–1466	Succeeded by Gabriel VI
