= Seat of the Coptic Orthodox Pope of Alexandria =

Papal seat of the Coptic Orthodox Church

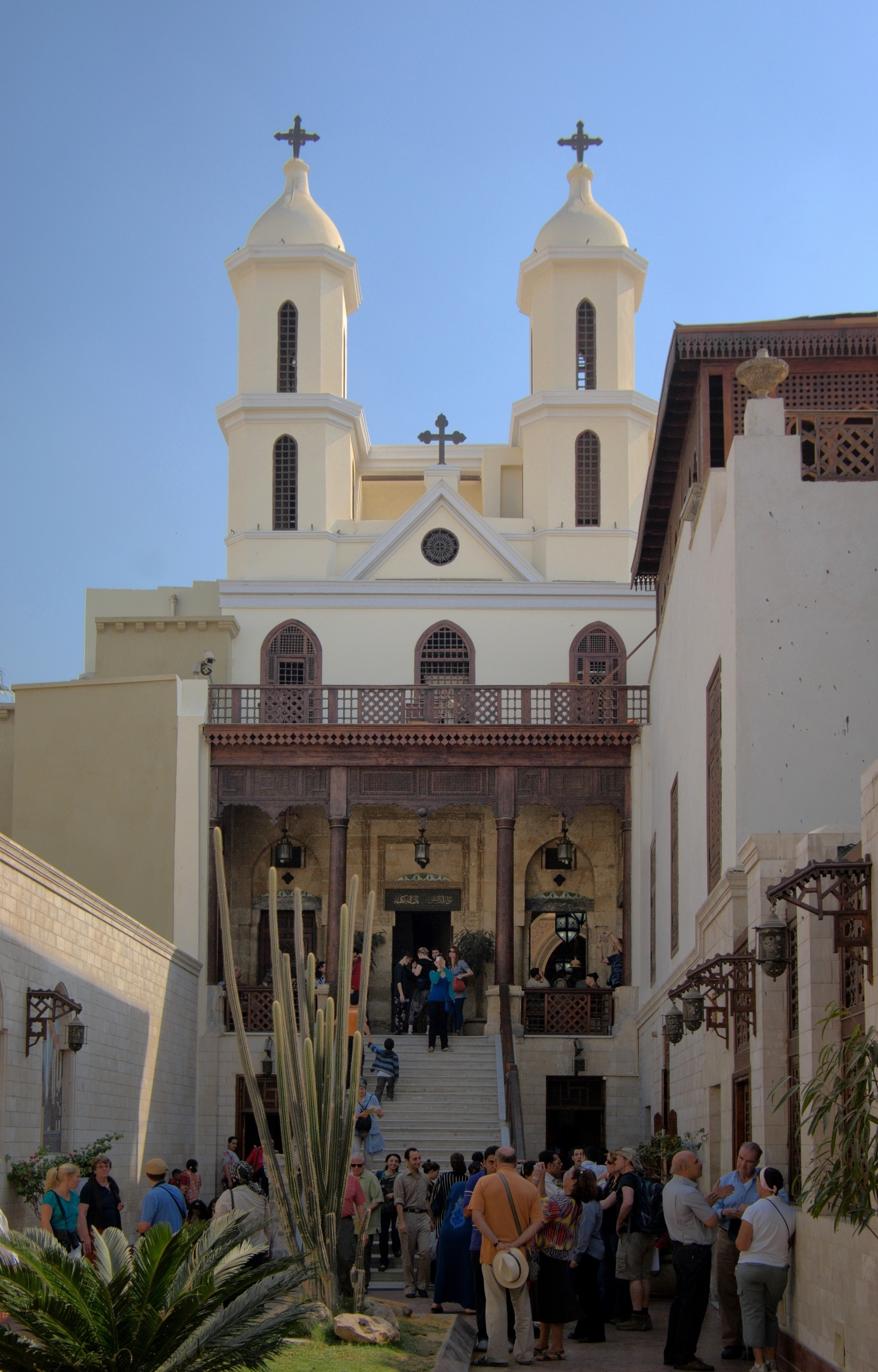
The Hanging Church is Cairo's most famous Coptic Church, first built in the 3rd or 4th century AD

The Seat of the Coptic Orthodox Pope of Alexandria is historically based in Alexandria, Egypt. It is commonly known as the See of Alexandria, or the Holy See of Saint Mark, to whom the Coptic Pope claims to be the legitimate successor.

Ruling powers moved away from Alexandria to Cairo after the Muslim conquest of Egypt. During Pope Christodolos's tenure, the official residence of the Coptic Pope moved to the Hanging Church in Cairo.

== Current seats ==
- Saint Mark's Coptic Orthodox Cathedral (Cairo) 1968–present
- Saint Mark's Coptic Orthodox Cathedral (Alexandria) c. AD 42–present

The current seat of the Coptic Orthodox Pope of Alexandria is in both Alexandria and Cairo, in the compound holding the patriarchal palace, Saint Mark's Coptic Orthodox Cathedral (known as St. Mark's Cathedral) and other patriarchal Institutions in both Alexandria and Cairo.

There is also a major patriarchal compound within the outer walls of the Monastery of Saint Pishoy in the Scetes of the Nitrian Desert of Egypt (Wadi El Natrun). It is used when the Pope is in a spiritual retreat or when hosting major ecclesiastical conventions within the Oriental Orthodox Churches or with the Eastern Orthodox Church or the Roman Catholic Church.

== Previous seats ==
- The Hanging Church in Coptic Cairo 1047–c.1300
- Saint Mercurius Church (Coptic Cairo) 1300–c.1400
- Saint Mary Church (Harat Zewila) 1400–1600
- Saint Mary Church (Haret Elroum) 1660–1800
- Saint Mark's Coptic Orthodox Cathedral (Azbakeya) 1800–1968

== See also ==
- Coptic Orthodox Church
- Coptic Cairo
