= Church of the Holy Virgin (Babylon El-Darag) =

Coptic Orthodox Church of the Holy Virgin Mary
- Coptic Orthodox Church of the Holy Virgin Mary
- 30°00′06″N 31°13′51″E
- Location: Babylon El-Darag, Coptic Cairo
- Country: Egypt
- Denomination: Coptic Orthodox Church

History
- Founded: 5th century (est.)
- Dedication: Virgin Mary
- Consecrated: 11th century

Architecture
- Architectural type: church
- Style: Coptic

Administration
- Division: The Coptic Orthodox Patriarchate
- Diocese: Coptic Orthodox Diocese of Old Cairo, Manial and Fum Al-Khalig

Clergy
- Bishop(s): Pope Tawadros II; Bishop Selwaniss

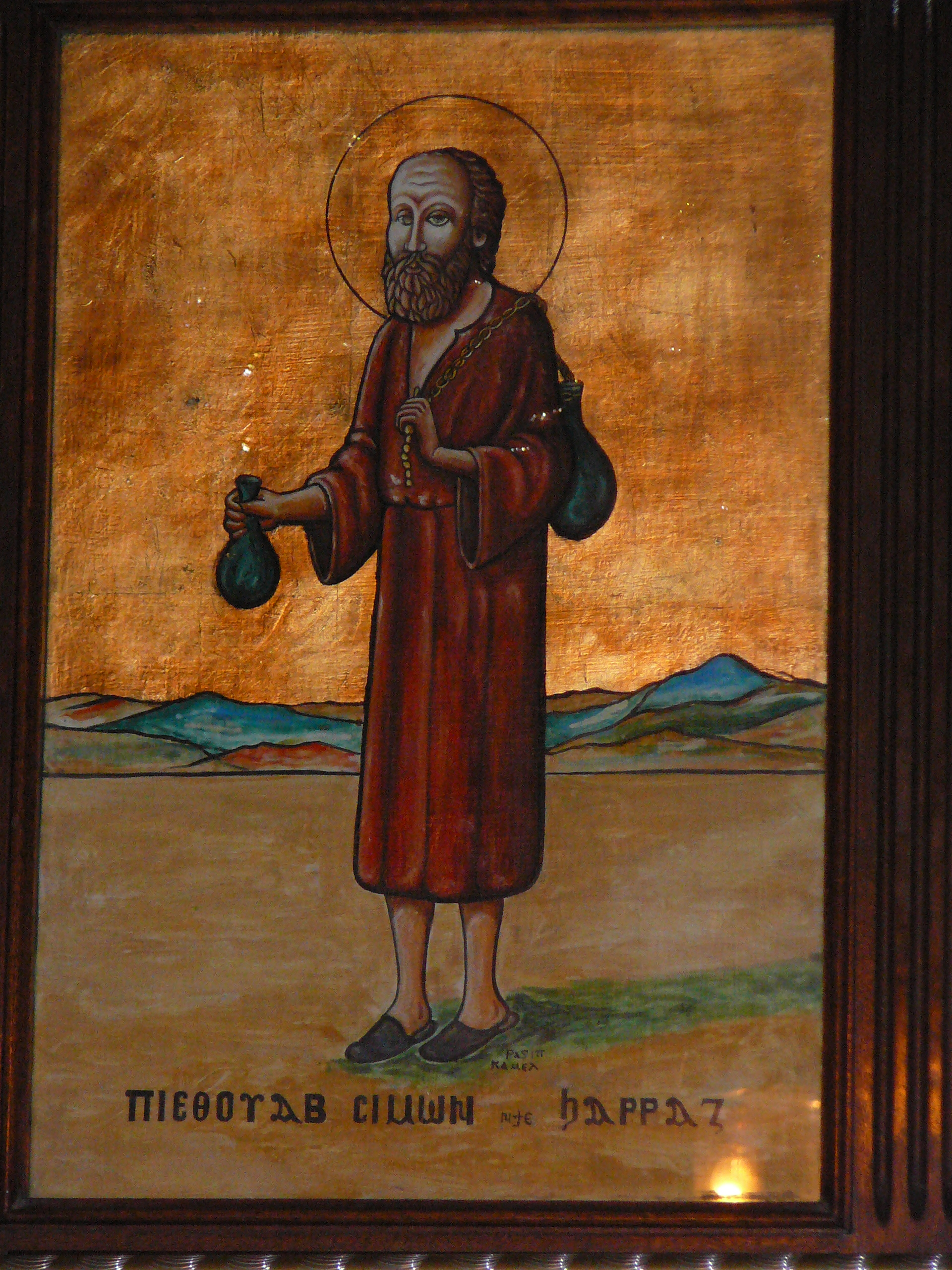
Coptic icon of St. Simon the Shoemaker, depicted as a one-eyed man carrying a sack of water, as he used to carry water to the sick and the old every morning before going to work

The Church of the Holy Virgin in Babylon El-Darag (Babylon of the Steps) (Arabic: كنيسة السيدة العذراء في بابليون الدرج) is a Coptic Orthodox church in Coptic Cairo built in the 11th century AD.

== History ==
The Church of the Holy Virgin in Babylon El-Darag was occupied from the 11th to the 15th centuries by several Coptic patriarchs, seven of whom were buried in the church. Pope Zacharias was one of them.

Pope Cyril VI of Alexandria used to pray in the church before assuming papacy. According to tradition, the church was one of the resting places of the Holy Family during their sojourn in Egypt, as well as the location from which Peter sent his epistle (1 Peter 5:13).

The relics of saints Demiana and Simon the Tanner are contained in the church as well.

== Architecture ==
The ground plan of the church is typical of other Coptic churches: a narthex, a nave, a choir, northern and southern aisles and three sanctuaries. The northern sanctuary is dedicated to the Virgin Mary and the southern sanctuary is used as a shrine. It contains several 19th-century icons of the Holy Virgin and saints Demiana, Stephen, Barbara, Shenouda, Paul the Hermit, Anthony, and Peter and Paul.

== See also ==
- Christian Egypt
- List of Coptic Orthodox churches in Egypt

== Bibliography ==
- Meinardus, Otto F. A. (1999). Two Thousand Years of Coptic Christianity (2nd ed.). Cairo: American University in Cairo. ISBN 977-424-511-3.
