= Church of the Virgin Mary (Haret Zuweila) =

Virgin Mary Coptic Orthodox Church
- Virgin Mary Coptic Orthodox Church
- 30.0519°N 31.2574°E
- Location: Haret Zuweila, Cairo
- Country: Egypt
- Denomination: Coptic Orthodox Church

History
- Founded: 10th century
- Dedication: Saint Mary
- Dedicated: 10th century

Architecture
- Architectural type: Church
- Style: Coptic Architecture

Administration
- Division: The Coptic Orthodox Patriarchate

Clergy
- Bishop: Pope Tawadros II

The Church of the Virgin Mary in Haret Zuweila (also transliterated as Haret Zeweila; ḥaret zuwēla) is the oldest church in the district of Haret Zuweila, near the Fatimid section of Cairo. It was probably built around the AD 10th century, though it is first mentioned in writing in the early 12th century on the occasion of the consecration of the new bishop of Cairo under Macarius' Papacy. The Church of the Virgin Mary in Haret Zuweila was the seat of the Coptic Orthodox Pope of Alexandria from c. 1400 AD to 1520 AD.

== History and architecture ==
The Church of the Virgin Mary in Haret Zuweila was founded in connection with the appointment of a new bishop of Cairo. It was destroyed in 1321, but after being rebuilt it became the Seat of the Coptic Orthodox Pope of Alexandria. The church was frequently remodeled and renovated, such that the original basilican structure has been considerably altered, and is therefore not known with certainty. Originally, the church featured a relatively small transept and a semi-circular apse. Like most Coptic churches, the floor plan is made up of a narthex (forecourt), a nave with two side aisles, and a choir with three sanctuaries (haykal).

Three rows of ancient marble Corinthian columns separate the northern and southern aisles and the nave from the narthex. A marble ambon is supported on four slender twisted columns. Across from the choir is a beam on which a modern painting of the Last Supper is affixed. The lectern is in the form of an eagle carved in wood.

The iconostasis of the central sanctuary is made of ebony inlaid with ivory, and is surmounted by thirteen icons of the Virgin Mary and the Twelve Apostles. Above the icons is a rod depicting on each side a dragon and an eagle in conflict. Each eagle has a panel showing John the Baptist on the right and the Virgin Mary on the left. The southern sanctuary is dedicated to the angel Gabriel and its door, which dates to the Fatimid Period, is inlaid with ivory panels and has sculpted relief of birds and animals. A lofty dome ornamented with gated pendentives rises above the sanctuary. The altar canopy itself is shaped like a dome on four marble columns.

The floor before the southern sanctuary has a well where, according to tradition, the water was blessed by Christ during the flight of the Holy Family in Egypt. Its waters are believed to have healing qualities. Along the top of the screen are seven icons dating to the 19th century. They depict the Annunciation, the Nativity, the Baptism, the Entry into Jerusalem, the Resurrection, the Ascension and the Descent of the Holy Spirit.

A shrine adjacent to the southern sanctuary contains several famous icons, including one of the Virgin Mary dating to the 14th century. The Virgin Mary is seated on a tree that grows from the back of Jesse (Isaiah 11:1-10). She is surrounded by four major and twelve minor prophets, above whom are two angels. According to tradition, whenever Pope Matthew I fell into temptation, he would stand before this icon and address it in supplication. The Virgin Mary would appear before him to comfort his soul. It is also said that Saint Ruweiss prayed before this icon.

The east side of the northern aisle has two sanctuaries whose screens are also inlaid with ivory. The first sanctuary is dedicated to the archangel Michael, and the second to John the Baptist. At the west end is a shrine in the center of which is an icon of the Crucifixion. Two other icons of the Baptism of Christ and the Virgin Mary are each placed on the right and left sides. The Church today measures 28 by 19 meters and stands at 11.5 meters high.

== The Convent of Nuns of the Holy Virgin Mary ==
A convent built by Pope Cyril IV was annexed to the church. It has a nuns' chapel in the gallery on the north side of the Church.

== Library ==
A library within the church contains many valuable manuscripts and a number of important icons, including one of the Annunciation that dates to about 1355 AD.

== See also ==
- Coptic art
- Coptic iconography
- List of Coptic Orthodox churches in Egypt
  - Saint Mary and Saint Abasikhiron Coptic Orthodox Church
  - Saint Mary Church (Haret Elroum)
  - St Mary and St Mercurius Coptic Orthodox Church
  - Church of the Holy Virgin (Babylon El-Darag)
