= Saint Mercurius Church in Coptic Cairo =

Orthodox church in Egypt

Monastery of Saint Mercurius
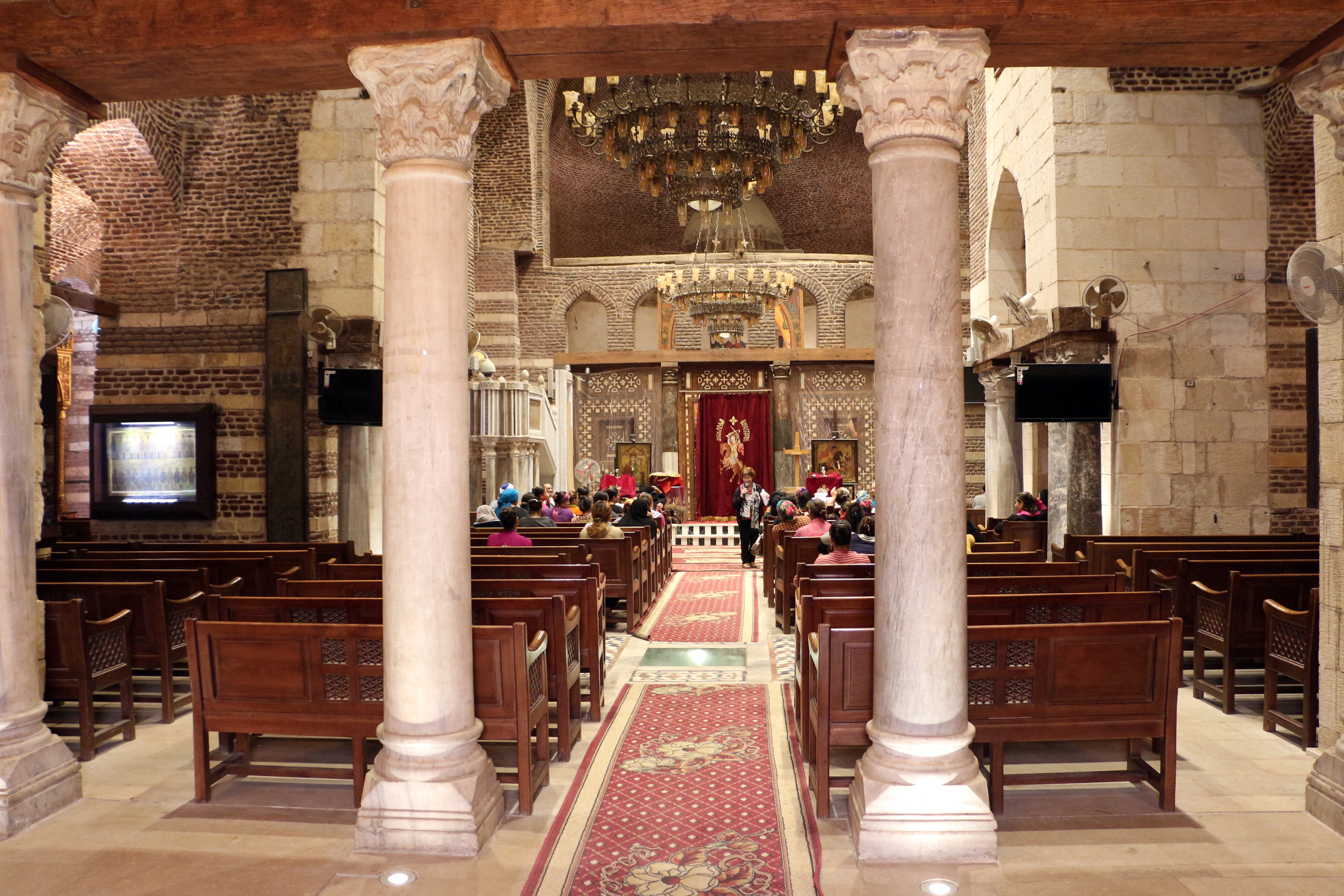

- Location within Egypt

Monastery information
- Other name: Deir Abu Sayfayn
- Dedication: Saint Mercurius
- Consecrated: 10th century
- Diocese: Coptic Orthodox Church of Alexandria

Site
- Location: Coptic Cairo, Egypt
- Coordinates: 30°00′44.8″N 31°13′50.9″E
- Public access: Yes

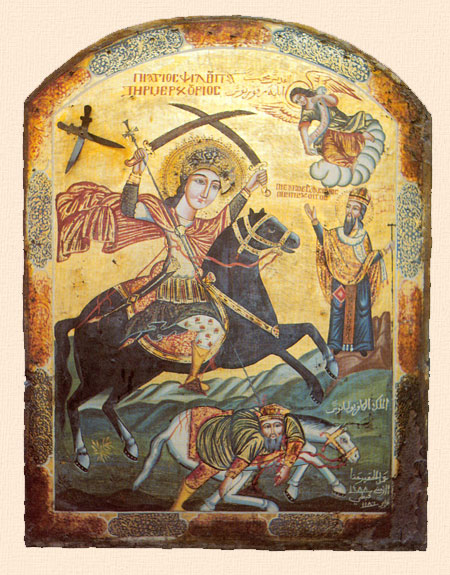
Icon of St. Philopater Mercurius in Saint Mercurius Church in Coptic Cairo

Saint Mercurius Church (Coptic: ⲙⲁⲣⲕⲟⲩⲣⲓⲟⲥ ⲧⲁⲧⲣⲁⲡⲩⲗⲱⲛ ⲙ̀ⲫⲓⲟⲙ) (Arabic: كنيسة أبو سيفين, romanized: Kanīsat ʔabū Sayfayn) in Coptic Cairo is a Coptic Orthodox church situated just to the north of the Babylon Fortress in Old Cairo among a group of important churches, and within the area known as the Abu Sayfayn Cloister is to be found three churches and a convent. One of these churches, dedicated to Saint Mercurius, and is the largest in the district of ancient Babylon.

The church is named after St. Philopater Mercurius who is known as Abu Sayfayn ("double sworded").

== Importance ==
The Church of Saint Mercurius served as the Seat of the Coptic Orthodox Pope of Alexandria between 1300 and 1500 AD and is perhaps the only one in Cairo with its original foundation intact. It stands 31.5 meters long by 21 meters wide.

Many Coptic patriarchs resided in the church during the 11th through the 15th centuries, and later during the 16 and 18th centuries, others were consecrated in the Church of St. Mercurius. The church also came to be the final resting place for many church leaders.

== Church building ==
The Church of Saint Mercurius itself was demolished and turned into a sugarcane warehouse, but was rebuilt by Patriarch Abraham (974–979). Afterwards, in 1080, 47 bishops met in the church by order of the Fatimid vizier Badr Al-Gamal to establish the Coptic canons. A mob burned it to the ground in 1168, but by 1176, it had been rebuilt.

Flanking the doorway are two Corinthian columns, while situated above it are two icons, one of Jesus Christ and the other the Holy Virgin. The central sanctuary screen consists of ebony inlaid with crosses and squares of thin plated ivory. The choir holds sixty-three icons made by Orhan Karabedian, while the nave contains a beautiful ambon consisting of mosaics which rest on fifteen columns. The south sanctuary, which had been dedicated to Saint Gabriel, was converted into a baptistry, while the north sanctuary, decorated with ivory and wood, is consecrated to the Holy Virgin. A stairway off the north aisle leads to an underground shrine. Saint Barsum the Naked stayed here for twenty years, dying in 1317. A service is held in the shrine on his feast day.

The shrine of the former abbess and Saint of the monastery Mother (Tamav) Irini.

Like many other old Coptic Orthodox churches that were rebuilt and restored time and again over the centuries, often re-using wood and stone-work. For this reason some parts of a church maybe of earlier date than the structure itself. Although they differ in size and architecture features they bear the unmistakable stamp of a Coptic church.

== See also ==
- List of Coptic Orthodox churches in Egypt
  - St Mary and St Mercurius Coptic Orthodox Church
- High medieval domes
