= List of Coptic monasteries =

The following is a list of Coptic monasteries in Egypt and around the world.

== Coptic Orthodox Monasteries in Egypt ==
=== See of Saint Mark Alexandria ===
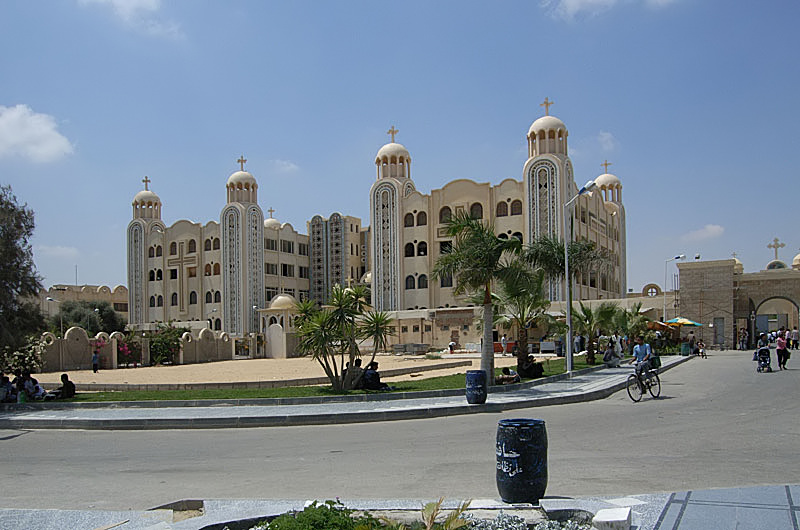
Monastery of Saint Menas.

1. St. Damiana Coptic Orthodox Convent - (Damietta)
2. St. George Coptic Orthodox Monastery - (Mit Damsis, Damietta)
3. St. Menas Coptic Orthodox Monastery - (Mariout, Alexandria)
4. St. Mercurius Coptic Orthodox Nunnery - (Alexandria)
5. Ennaton Coptic Orthodox Monastery - (Dakahlia) - (uninhabited)
6. Metanoia Coptic Orthodox Monastery - (East Alexandria) - (uninhabited)
7. Oktikaidekaton Coptic Orthodox Monastery - (Alexandria) - (uninhabited)
8. Pempton Coptic Orthodox Monastery - (Mariout, Alexandria) - (uninhabited)
9. St. Cyprius (Dair Qabriyus) Coptic Orthodox Monastery - (Northeast Alexandria) - (uninhabited)
10. (# 600) Coptic Orthodox Monasteries - (In and outside the city of Alexandria) - (Destroyed in the 7th century)
11. St. Menas Coptic Orthodox Monastery - (Abu Mena) - (Destroyed)

=== Diocese of Wadi El Natrun ===
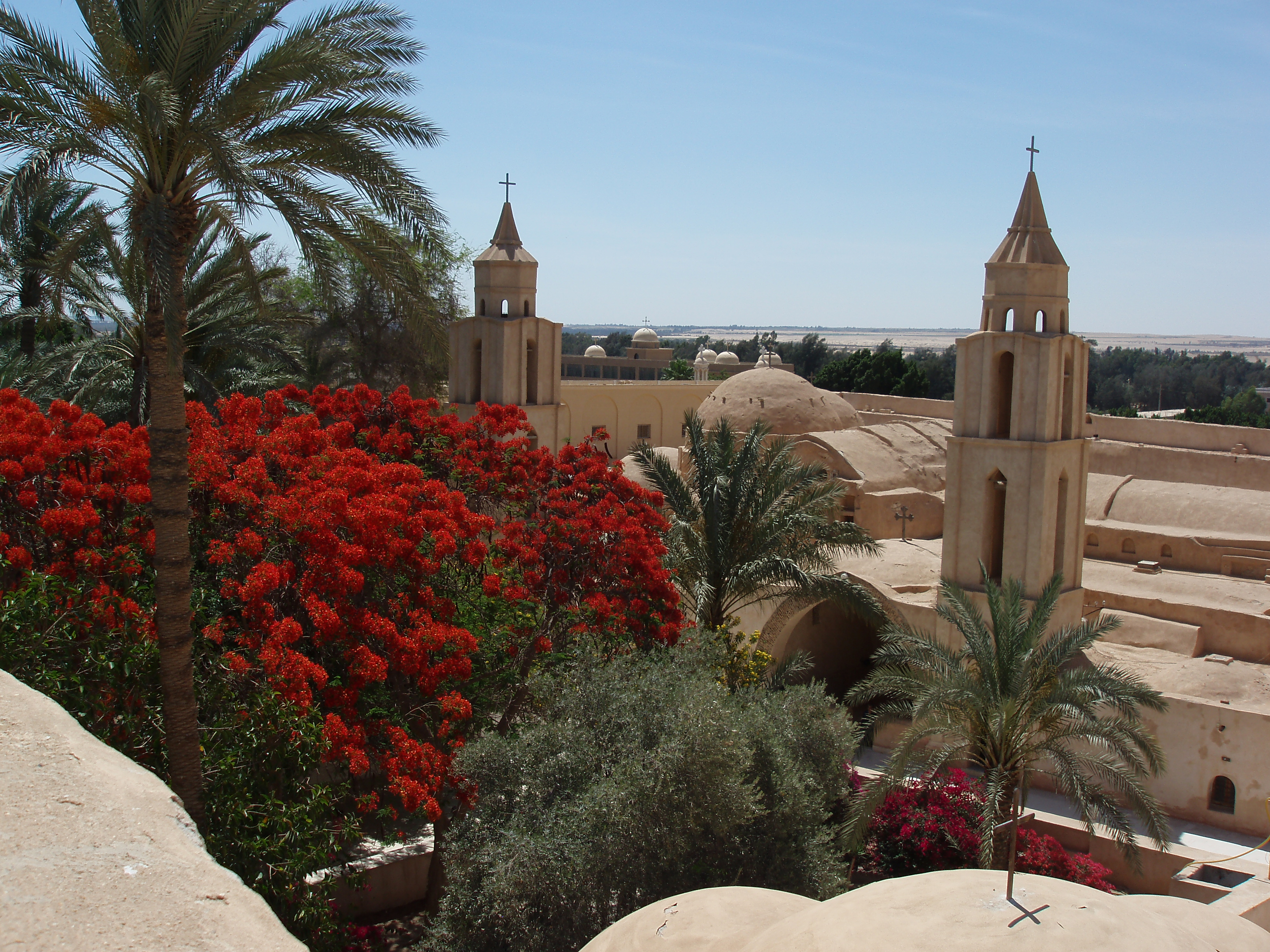
Monastery of Saint Pishoy.

1. Paromeos Coptic Orthodox Monastery - (Wadi El Natrun)
2. St. Macarius Coptic Orthodox Monastery - (Wadi El Natrun)
3. St. Pishoy Coptic Orthodox Monastery - (Wadi El Natrun)
4. Virgin Mary (El-Sourian) Coptic Orthodox Monastery - (Wadi El Natrun)
5. St. George Coptic Orthodox Monastery - (Khatatba, Monufia)
6. St. Thomas Coptic Orthodox Monastery - (Khatatba, Monufia)
7. Armenian Coptic Orthodox Monastery - (uninhabited)
8. St. John the Dwarf Coptic Orthodox Monastery - (uninhabited)
9. St. Moses the Black Coptic Orthodox Monastery - (uninhabited)

=== Diocese of Cairo ===
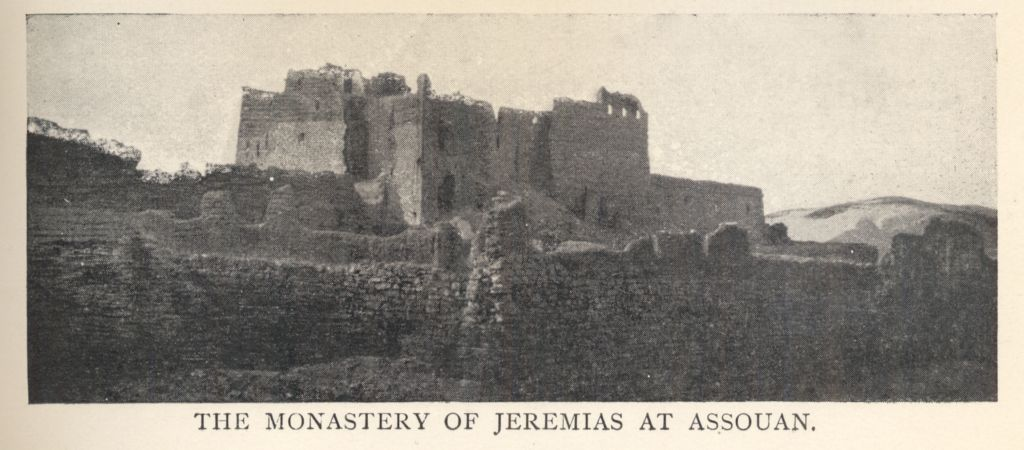
Monastery of the Prophet Jeremiah.

1. St. Anthony Coptic Orthodox Monastery - (Qimn al-Arus)
2. St. Paul the Theban Coptic Orthodox Monastery - (Qimn al-Arus)
3. St. George Coptic Orthodox Nunnery - (Coptic Cairo)
4. St. Mercurius (Abu-Sefein) Coptic Orthodox Convent - (Coptic Cairo)
5. St. Mercurius Coptic Orthodox Monastery - (Tammua)
6. St. Menas Coptic Orthodox Monastery - (Fumm al-Khalig)
7. St. Mary Coptic Orthodox Convent - (Old Cairo)
8. St. Samaan the Tanner Coptic Orthodox Monastery - (Zabbaleen, Mokattam)
9. St. Theodore the Oriental Coptic Orthodox Monastery - (Haret Elroum)
10. Virgin Mary Coptic Orthodox Convent - (Haret Zuweila)
11. St. George Coptic Orthodox Convent - (Haret Zuweila)
12. St. Barsoum El-Erian Coptic Orthodox Monastery - (Monshat Naser, Helwan)
13. Prophet Jeremiah Coptic Orthodox Monastery - (Saqqara) - (uninhabited)
14. St. Arsenius Coptic Orthodox Monastery - (Wadi al-Tih) - (uninhabited)

=== Diocese of Fayyum ===
1. Archangel Gabriel Coptic Orthodox Monastery - (Naqlun, Fayyum)
2. Holy Virgin Mary (Deir al-Hammam) Coptic Orthodox Monastery - (Luhan, Fayyum)
3. St. Macarius of Alexandria Coptic Orthodox Monastery - (Wadi Elrayan, Fayyum)
4. St. George Coptic Orthodox Monastery - (Fayyum)

=== Diocese of Beni Suef ===
1. Monastery of Saint Samuel the Confessor

=== Diocese of Eastern Desert ===
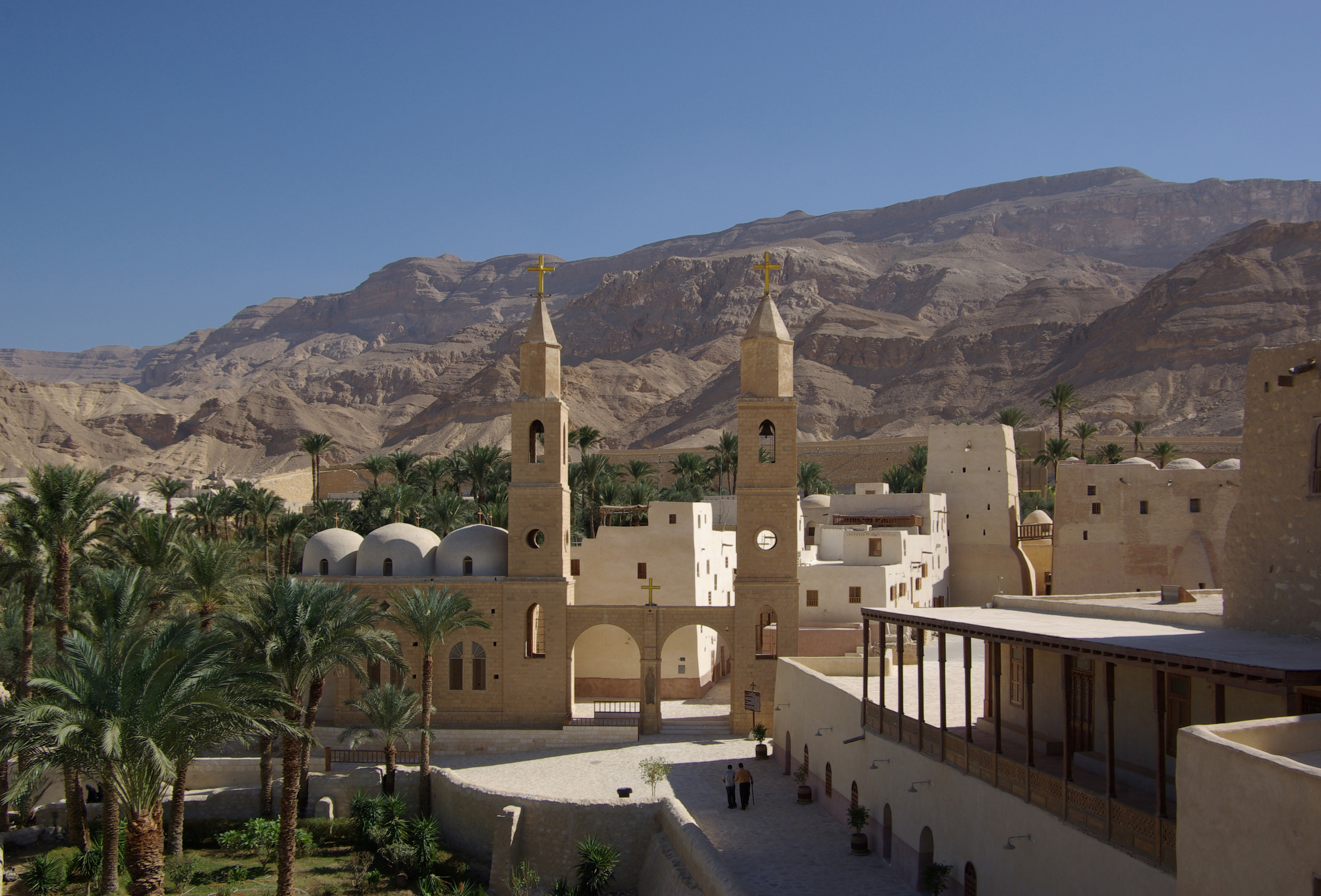
Monastery of St. Anthony - (Eastern Desert).

1. St. Anthony Coptic Orthodox Monastery - (Eastern Desert)
2. St. Paul the Anchorite Coptic Orthodox Monastery - (Eastern Desert)
3. St. Catherine Greek Orthodox Monastery - (Saint Catherine)

=== Diocese of Minya and al-Ashmunein ===
1. al-Sanquriya Coptic Orthodox Monastery - (Oxyrhynchus)
2. Holy Virgin Mary Coptic Orthodox Monastery - (Minya)
3. St. Fana Coptic Orthodox Monastery - (Qasr Hur)
4. St. Pishoy Coptic Orthodox Monastery - (Deir el-Bersha, Mallawi)
5. St. John (Deir Abu Hinnis) Coptic Orthodox Monastery - (Ansena) - (uninhabited)
6. Holy Virgin Mary Coptic Orthodox Monastery - (Minya) - (uninhabited)

=== Diocese of Asyut ===
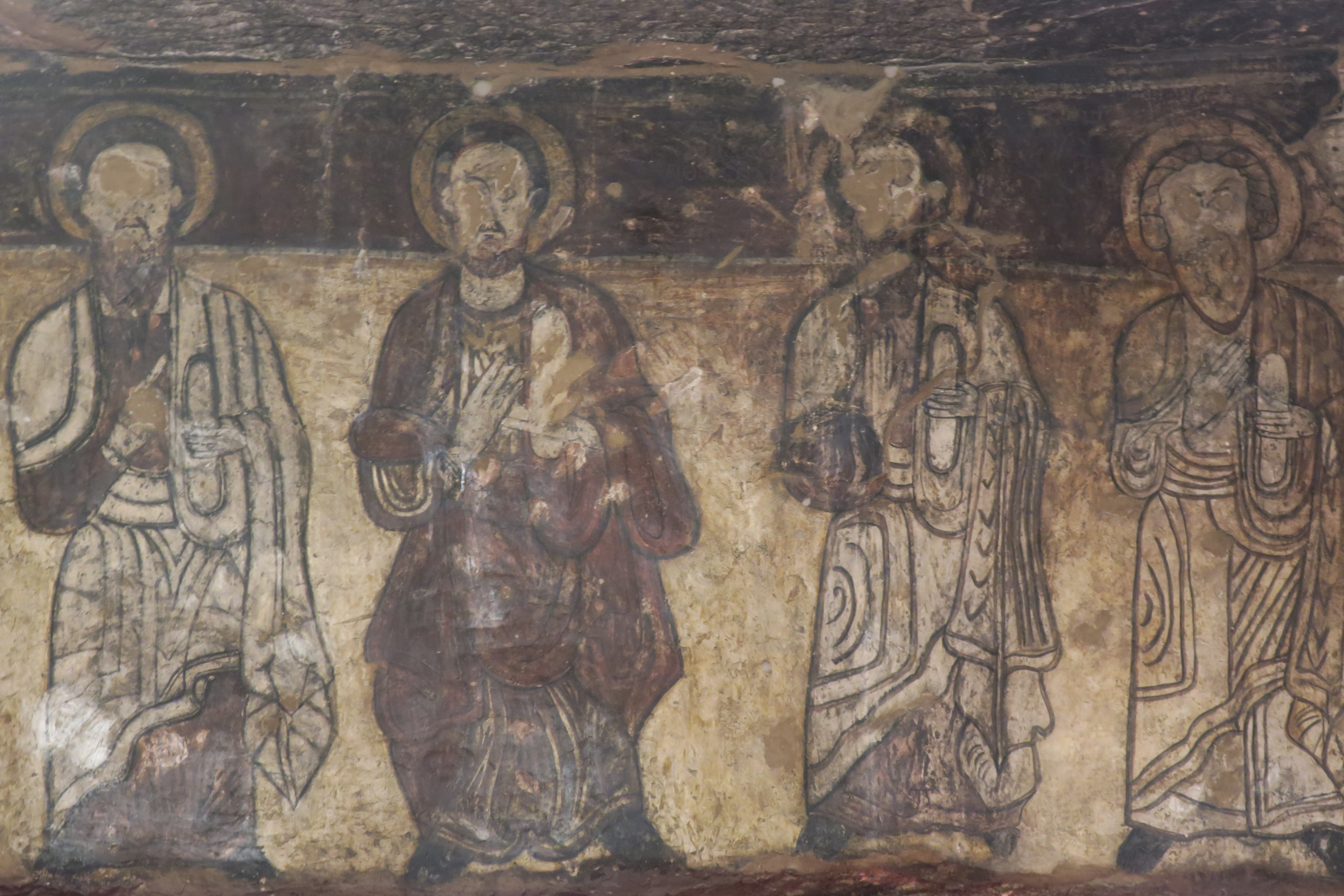
Ancient Mural at Deir el Ganadla

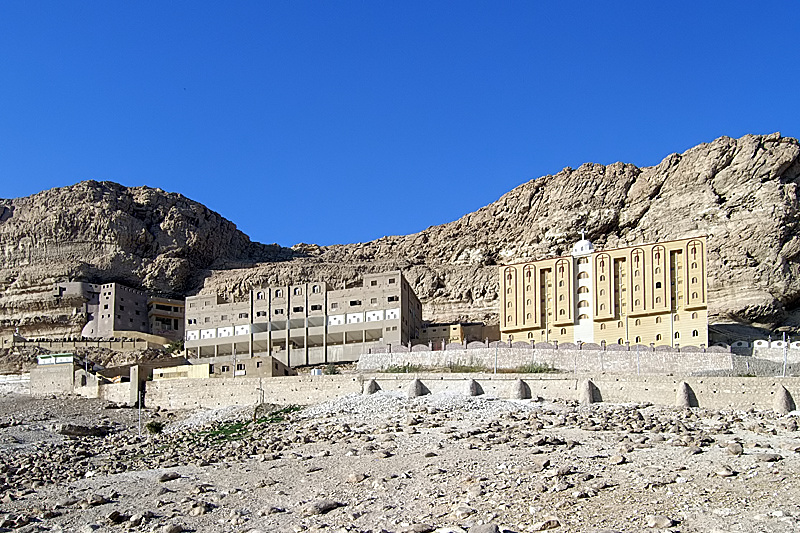
The Hanging Monastery - (Deir El-Mualaq).

1. Holy Virgin Mary Coptic Orthodox Monastery - (Deir el Ganadla, Asyut)
2. Holy Virgin Mary Coptic Orthodox Monastery - (Durunka)
3. Holy Virgin Mary Coptic Orthodox Monastery - (El-Qusiya)
4. The Hanging Coptic Orthodox Monastery - (Deir El-Mualaq)
5. St. Apollo at Bawit Coptic Orthodox Monastery - (Asyut) - (uninhabited)
6. St. Mina Coptic Orthodox Monastery - (Abnub, Asyut)

=== Diocese of Sohag ===
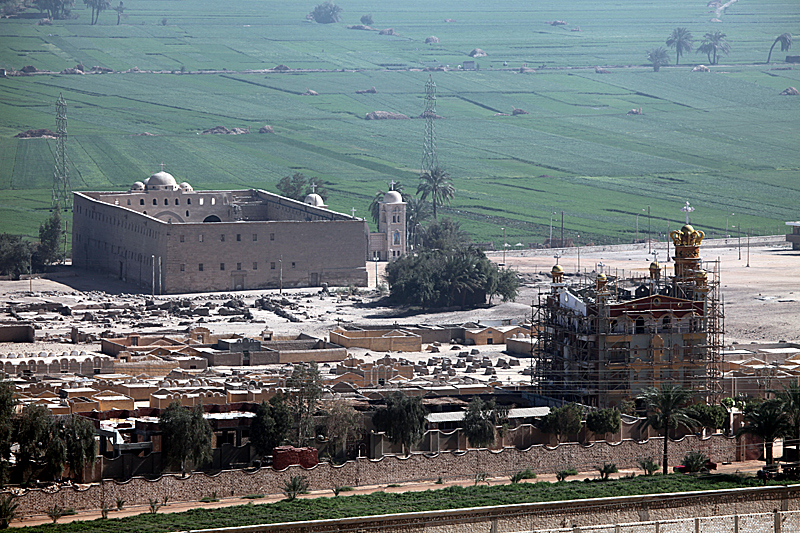
Monastery of St. Shenouda (Left) & Monastery of St. Karas (Right).

1. Archangel Michael Coptic Orthodox Monastery - (Akhmim)
2. Holy Virgin Mary Coptic Orthodox Monastery - (Hawawish, Akhmim)
3. St. George (Dair al-Hadid) Coptic Orthodox Monastery - (Akhmim)
4. Coptic Orthodox Monastery of the Martyrs - (Akhmim)
5. St. Pachomius the Martyr Coptic Orthodox Monastery - (Akhmim)
6. St. Pisada Coptic Orthodox Monastery - (Akhmim)
7. St. Thomas the Hermit Coptic Orthodox Monastery - (Akhmim)
8. St. Karas Coptic Orthodox Monastery - (Sohag)
9. St. Michael Coptic Orthodox Monastery - (as-Salamuni)
10. St. Pishay Coptic Orthodox Monastery - (Sohag)

==== St. Shenouda The Archimandrite Coptic Orthodox Monastery - (Sohag) ====
1. Abouna Yassa Coptic Orthodox Monastery - (Tima)
2. The Seven Mountains Coptic Orthodox Monastery - (Bir al-'Ain)
3. Naga ed-Deir (ancient monastery excavation site near just north of Girga)

=== Diocese of Qena ===
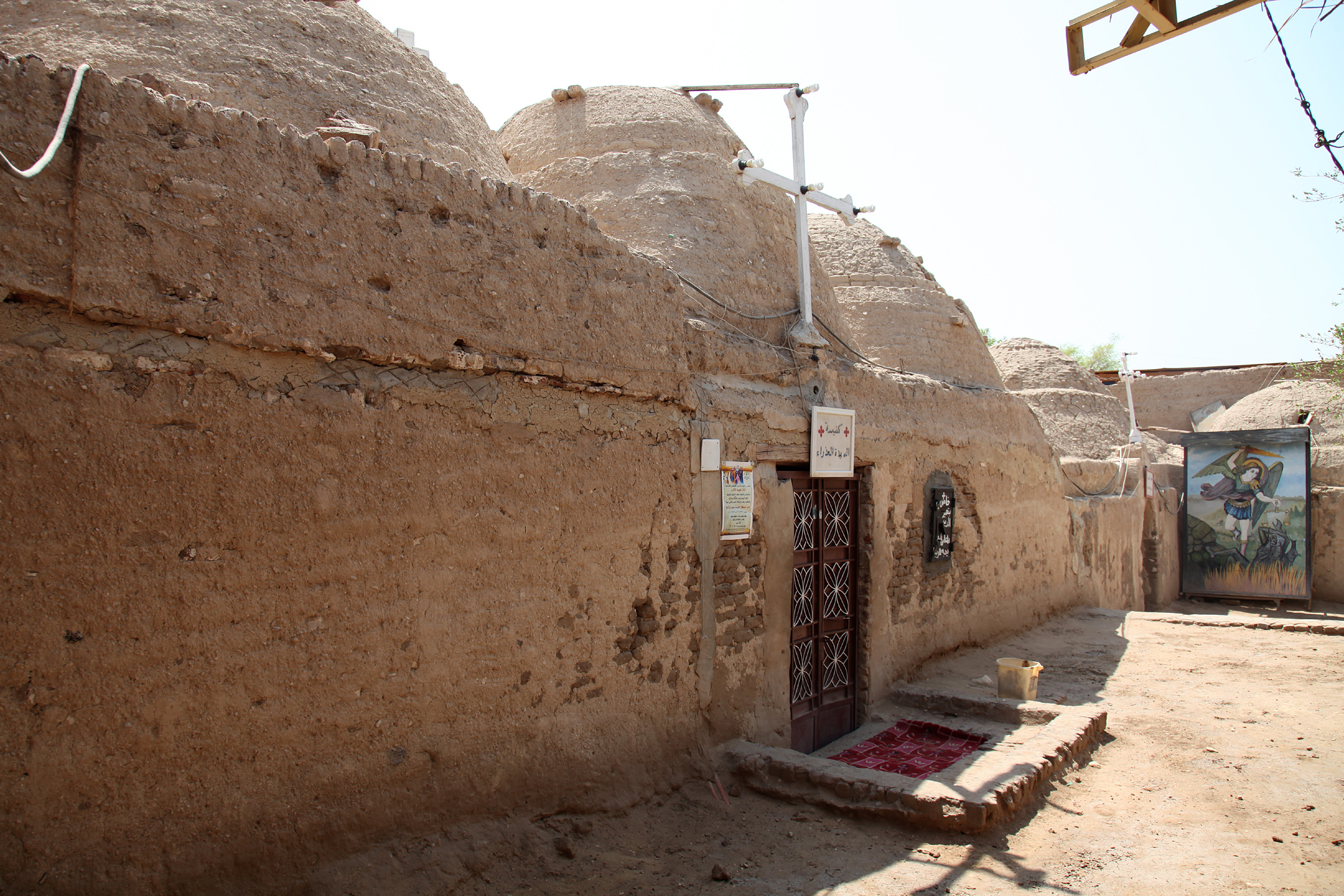
Monastery of the Archangel Michael - (Qamula, Qena).

1. Holy Cross Coptic Orthodox Monastery - (Hagir Danfīq, Qena)
2. St. Badaba Coptic Orthodox Monastery - (Nag Hammadi, Qena)
3. Archangel Michael Coptic Orthodox Monastery - (Naqada, Qena)
4. St. George Coptic Orthodox Monastery - (Naqada, Qena)
5. Archangel Michael Coptic Orthodox Monastery - (Qamula, Qena)
6. St. Andrews Coptic Orthodox Monastery - (Qamula, Qena)
7. St. Pisentius Coptic Orthodox Monastery - (Qamula, Qena)
8. St. Victor Coptic Orthodox Monastery - (Qamula, Qena) - (uninhabited)

=== Diocese of Luxor ===
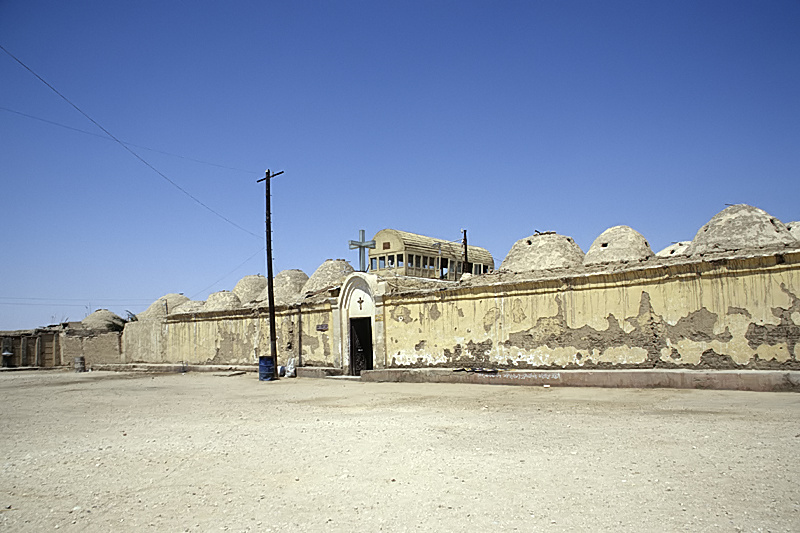
Monastery of St. Theodore the Warrior - (Luxor).

1. St. George Coptic Orthodox Monastery - (Mahrosa, Luxor)
2. St. George Coptic Orthodox Monastery - (Riziqat, Luxor)
3. Coptic Orthodox Monastery of the Martyrs - (Esna, Luxor)
4. St. Matthew the Potter Coptic Orthodox Monastery - (Esna, Luxor)
5. St. Pachomius Coptic Orthodox Monastery - (El-Shayeb, Luxor)
6. St. Pishoy Coptic Orthodox Monastery - (Armant, Luxor)
7. St. Theodore the Warrior Coptic Orthodox Monastery - (Luxor)
8. St. Wannas Coptic Orthodox Monastery - (Luxor)

=== Diocese of Aswan ===
1. St. Pachomius Coptic Orthodox Monastery - (Edfu)
2. St. Simeon (St. Hadra) Coptic Orthodox Monastery - (Qubbet el-Hawa)

=== New Valley Governorate ===
1. Archangel Michael Coptic Orthodox Monastery - (Dakhla Oasis) - (Destroyed)
2. St. Matthew Coptic Orthodox Monastery - (Dakhla Oasis) - (Destroyed)

== Coptic Orthodox Patriarchate in Jerusalem ==
=== Israel ===
1. St. Anthony Coptic Orthodox Monastery - (Jerusalem)
2. St. Mary Coptic Orthodox Convent - (Bethlehem)
3. Al-Sultan Coptic Orthodox Monastery - (Jerusalem)
4. St George Coptic Orthodox Convent - (Jerusalem)
5. St. Anthony Coptic Orthodox Monastery - (Jericho)
6. St. Bishoy Coptic Orthodox Monastery - (Jericho)
7. St. Zacchaeus Coptic Orthodox Monastery - (Jericho)

=== Syria ===
1. St. George Coptic Orthodox Monastery - (Homs)

=== Jordan ===
1. St. Anthony Coptic Orthodox Monastery - (Madaba)

== Coptic Orthodox monasteries overseas ==
Coptic Orthodox monasteries Outside Egypt.

=== Australia ===
1. St. Anthony Coptic Orthodox Monastery - (Heathcote, Victoria)
2. St. Shenouda the Archimandrite Coptic Orthodox Monastery - (Putty, New South Wales)
3. St. Mary and St Anthony Coptic Orthodox Monastery - (Kooralbyn, Queensland)
4. Archangel Michael Coptic Orthodox Monastery for Nuns - (Woodend, Victoria)
5. St Mary and St Demiana's Monastery, Queensland Australia for Nuns

=== Canada ===
1. St. Anthony Coptic Orthodox Monastery - (Perth, Ontario)
2. St. Mary, St. George & St. Philopateer Coptic Orthodox Convent - (Paisley, Ontario)
3. St. George & St. Paul The Anchorite Monastery

=== Germany ===
1. St. Anthony Coptic Orthodox Monastery - (Kröffelbach, Germany)
2. St. Mary & St. Mauritius Coptic Orthodox Monastery - (Höxter, Germany)

=== Italy ===
1. St. Shenouda The Archimandrite Coptic Orthodox Monastery - (Milan)

=== France ===
1. St. Mary and Archangel Michael Monastery

=== Netherlands ===
1. El Amir Tadros El Meshreky Monastery

=== Austria ===
1. St. Anthony's Monastery
2. St. Anna's Monastery

=== United States of America ===
1. St. Anthony Coptic Orthodox Monastery - (Newberry Springs, California)
2. St. Mary & St. Moses Abbey - (Sandia, Texas)
3. St. Mary & St. Demiana Coptic Orthodox Convent - (Dawsonville, Georgia)
4. St. Mary & St. John The Beloved Coptic Orthodox Convent - (Warren, Ohio)
5. St. Paul Brotherhood - (Murrieta, California)
6. Coptic Monastery of St. Shenouda in Rochester - (New York)
7. Holy Virgin Mary Spiritual Vineyard - (Charlton, Massachusetts)
8. St. Mary & St. Phoebe Consecrated Sisters
9. St. Katherine and St. Verena Coptic Orthodox Convent https://www.sksvcopticconvent.org/

=== United Kingdom ===
- St. Athanasius Coptic Orthodox Monastery - (England)

=== Ireland ===
- St. George Coptic Orthodox Convent - (Dublin)

== Gallery ==
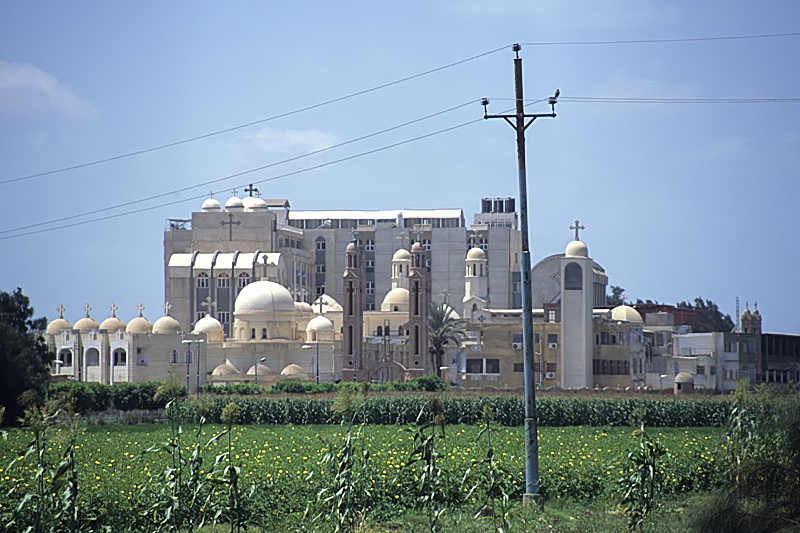
St. Damiana Coptic Orthodox Convent - (Damietta)

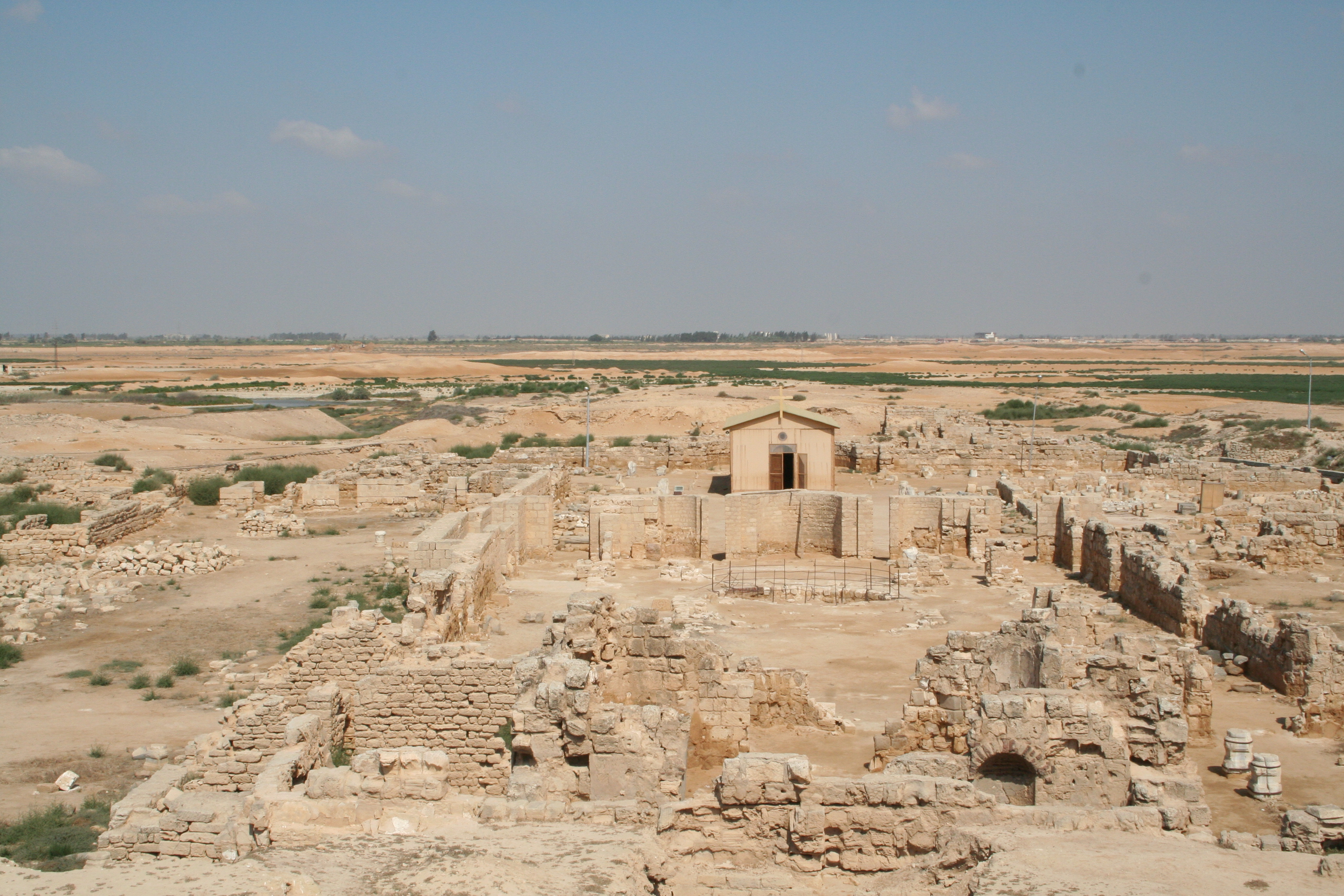
Remains of St. Menas Coptic Orthodox Monastery - (Abu Mina)

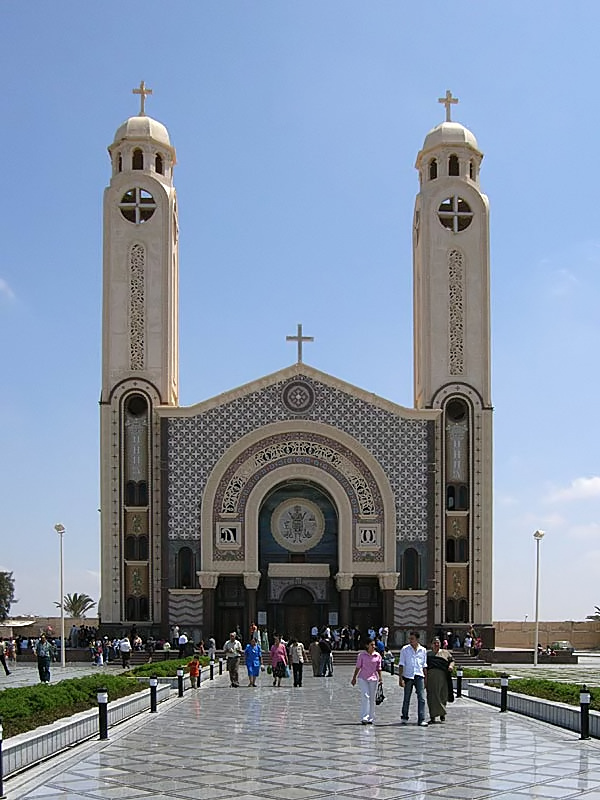
St. Menas Coptic Orthodox Monastery - (Mariout)

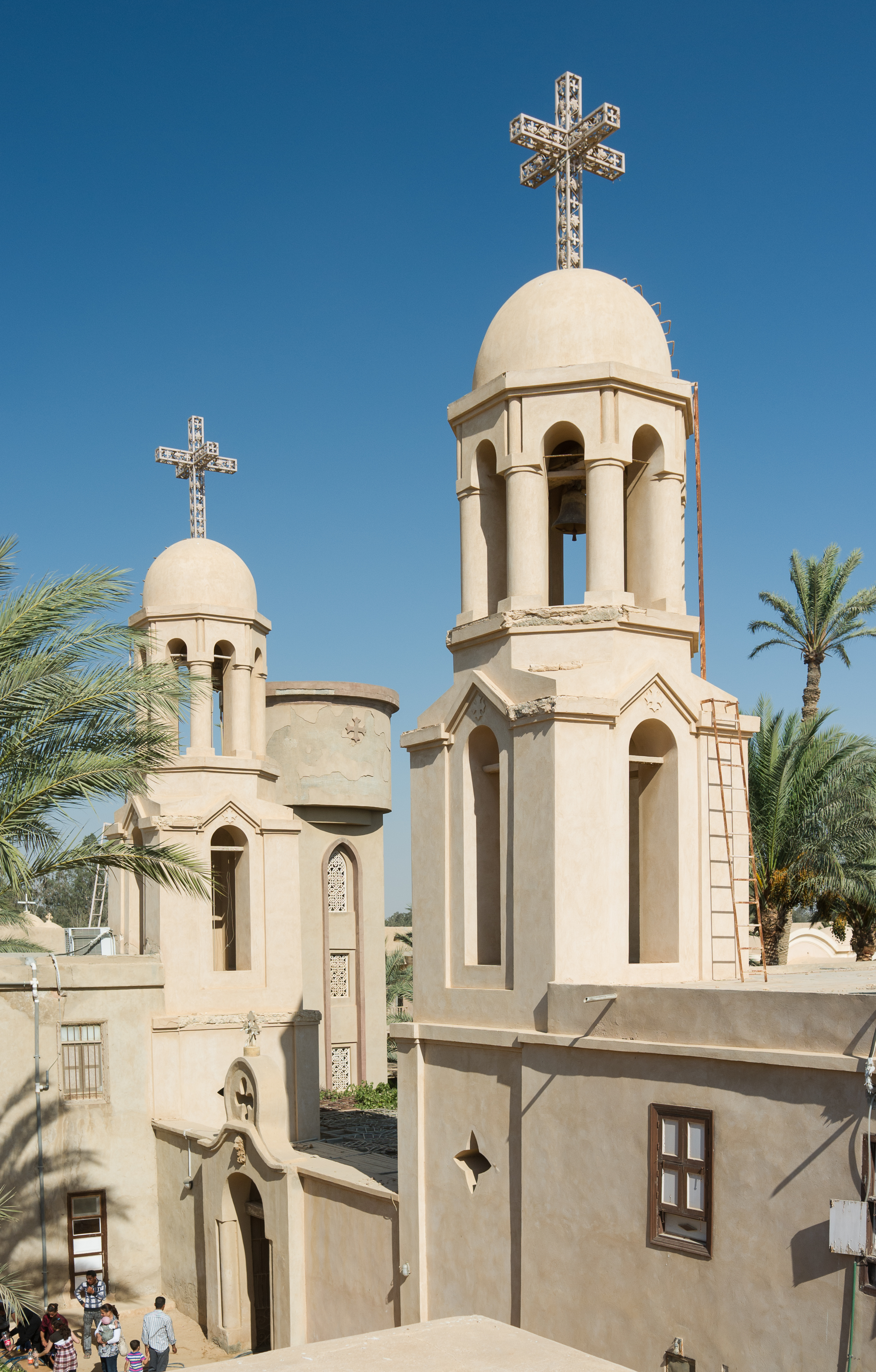
Paromeos Coptic Orthodox Monastery - (Wadi El Natrun)

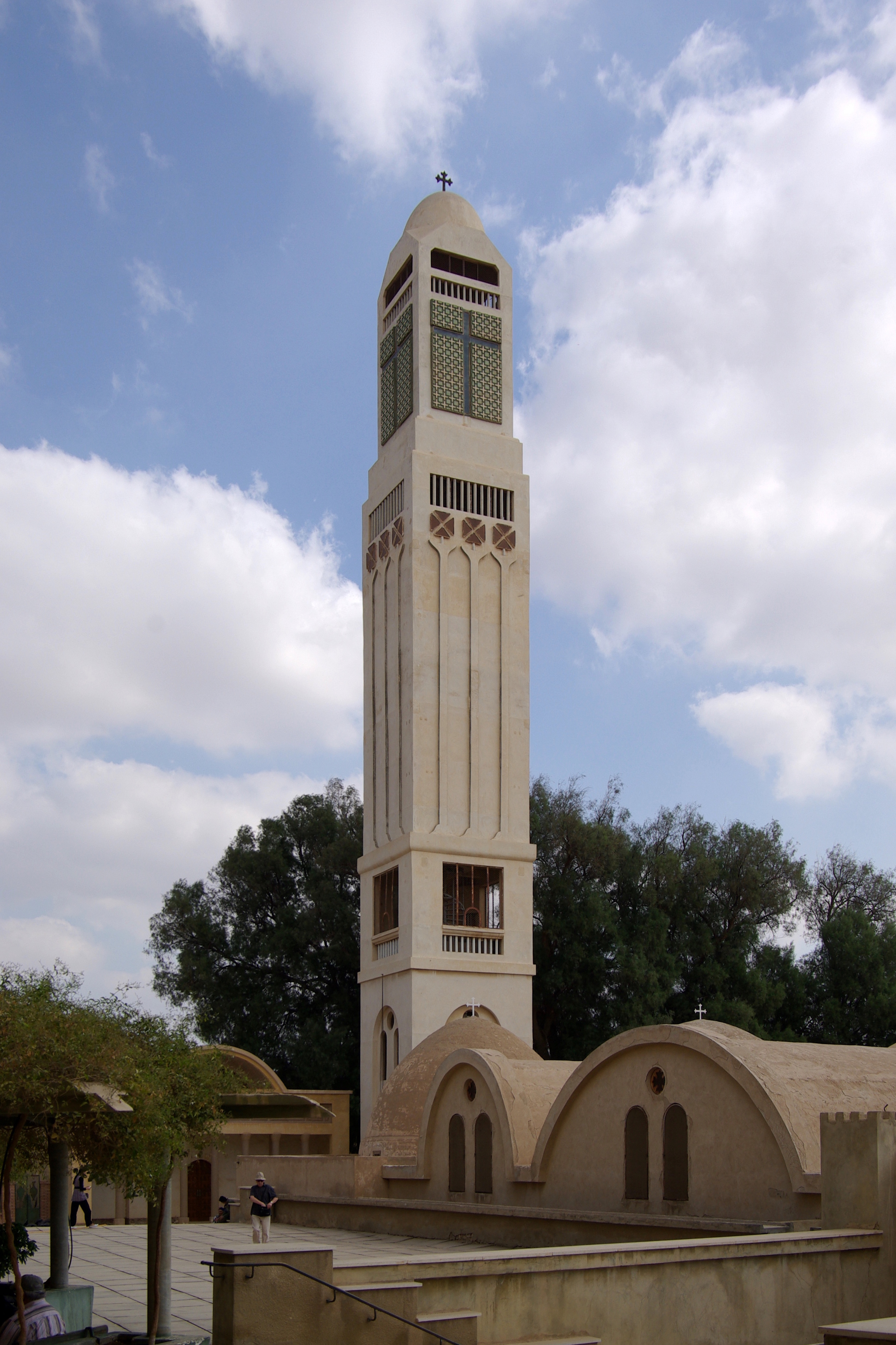
St. Macarius Coptic Orthodox Monastery - (Wadi El Natrun)

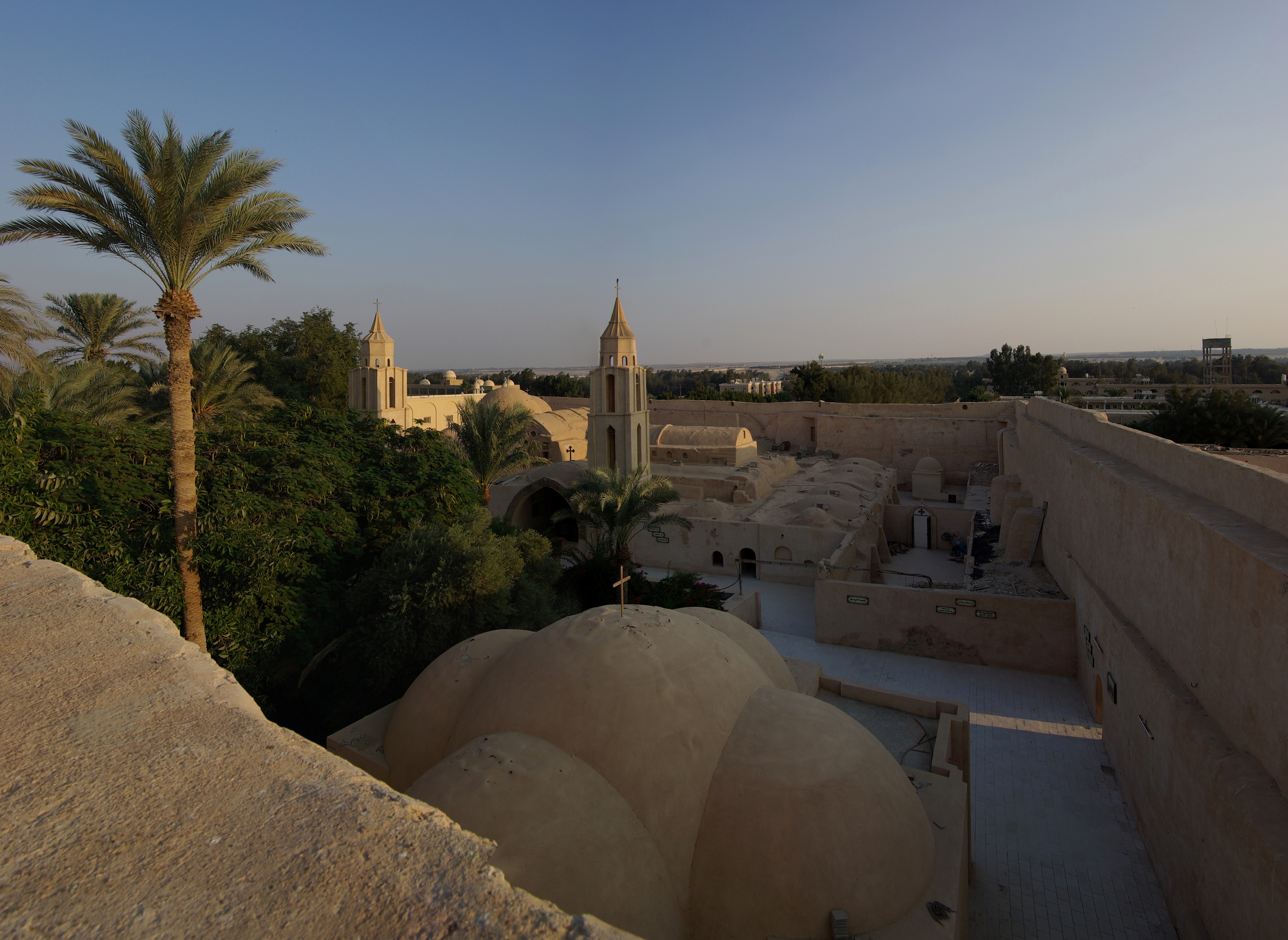
St. Pishoy Coptic Orthodox Monastery - (Wadi El Natrun)

St. Pishoy Coptic Orthodox Monastery - (Wadi El Natrun)

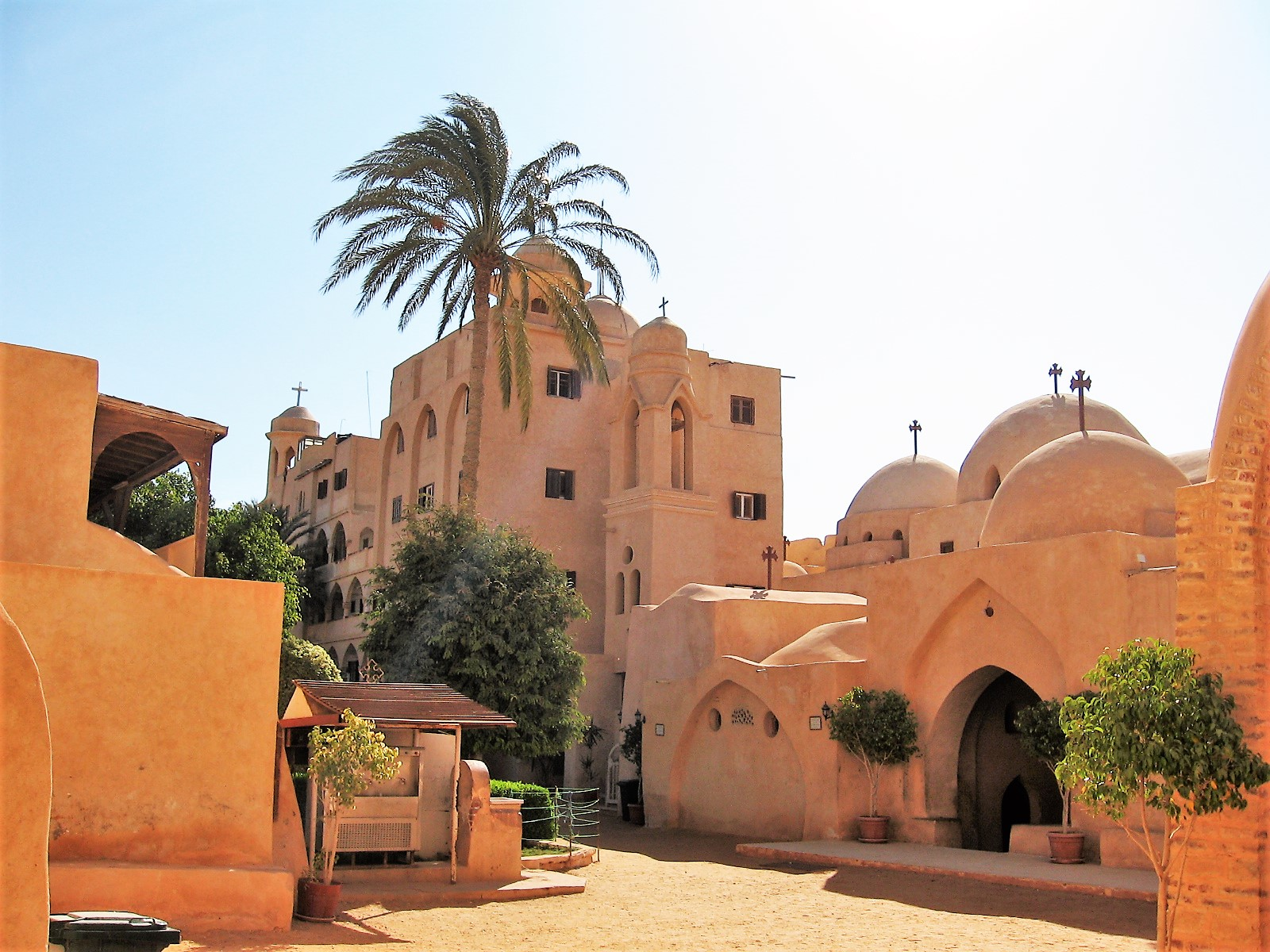
El-Sourian Coptic Orthodox Monastery - (Wadi El Natrun)

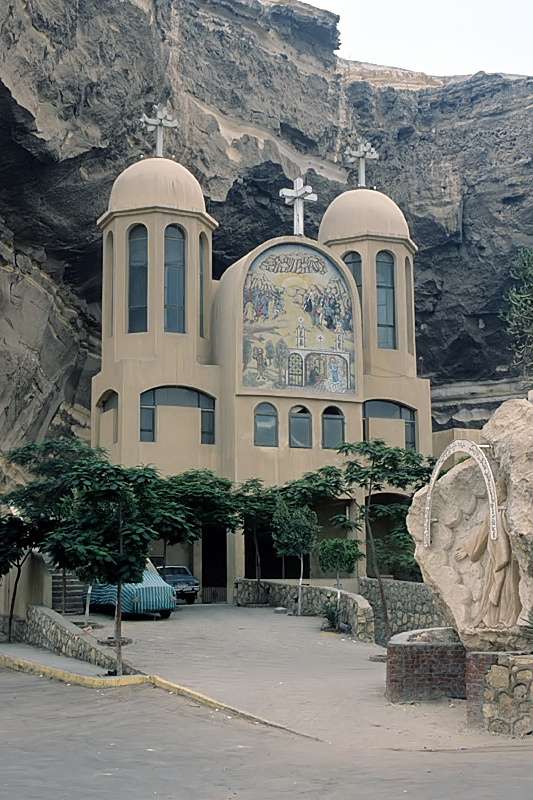
St. Simon the Tanner Coptic Orthodox Monastery - (Mokattam)

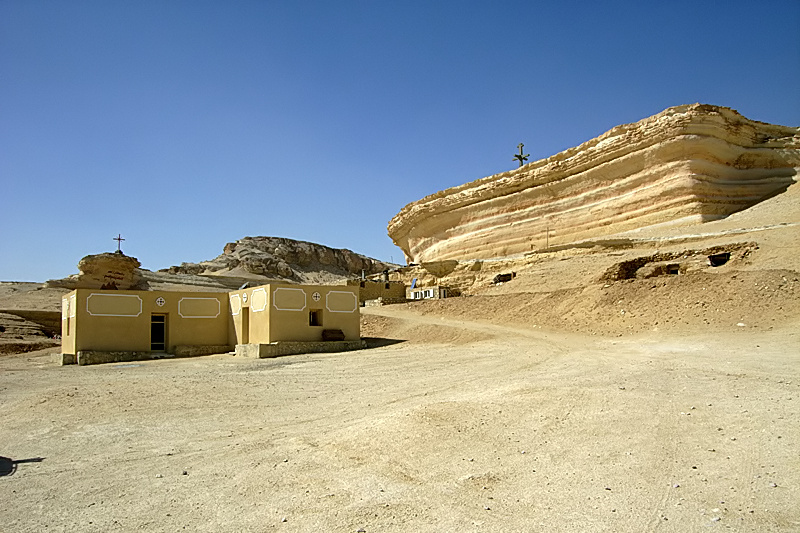
St. Macarius of Alexandria Coptic Orthodox Monastery - (Wadi Elrayan)

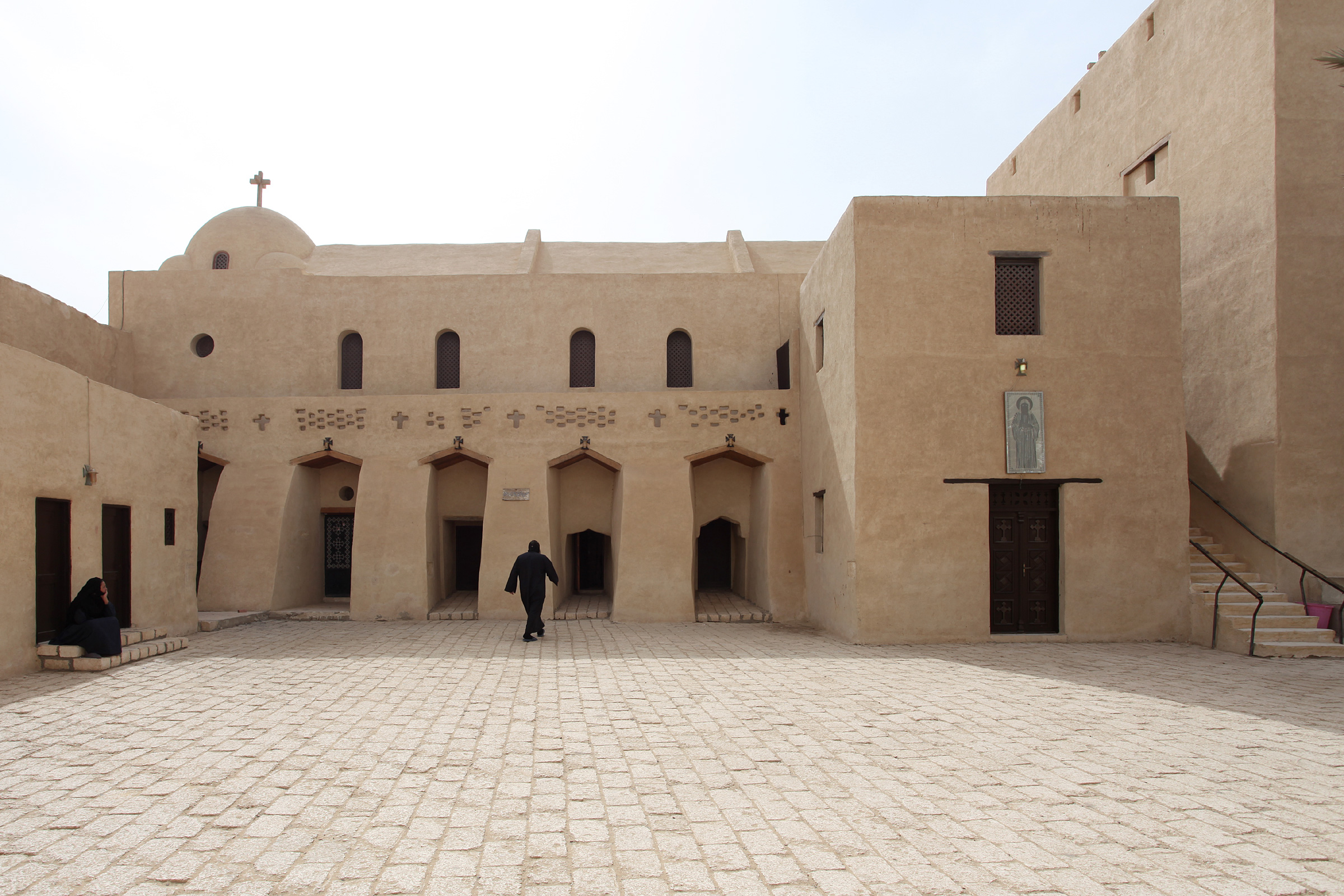
St. Samuel the Confessor Coptic Orthodox Monastery

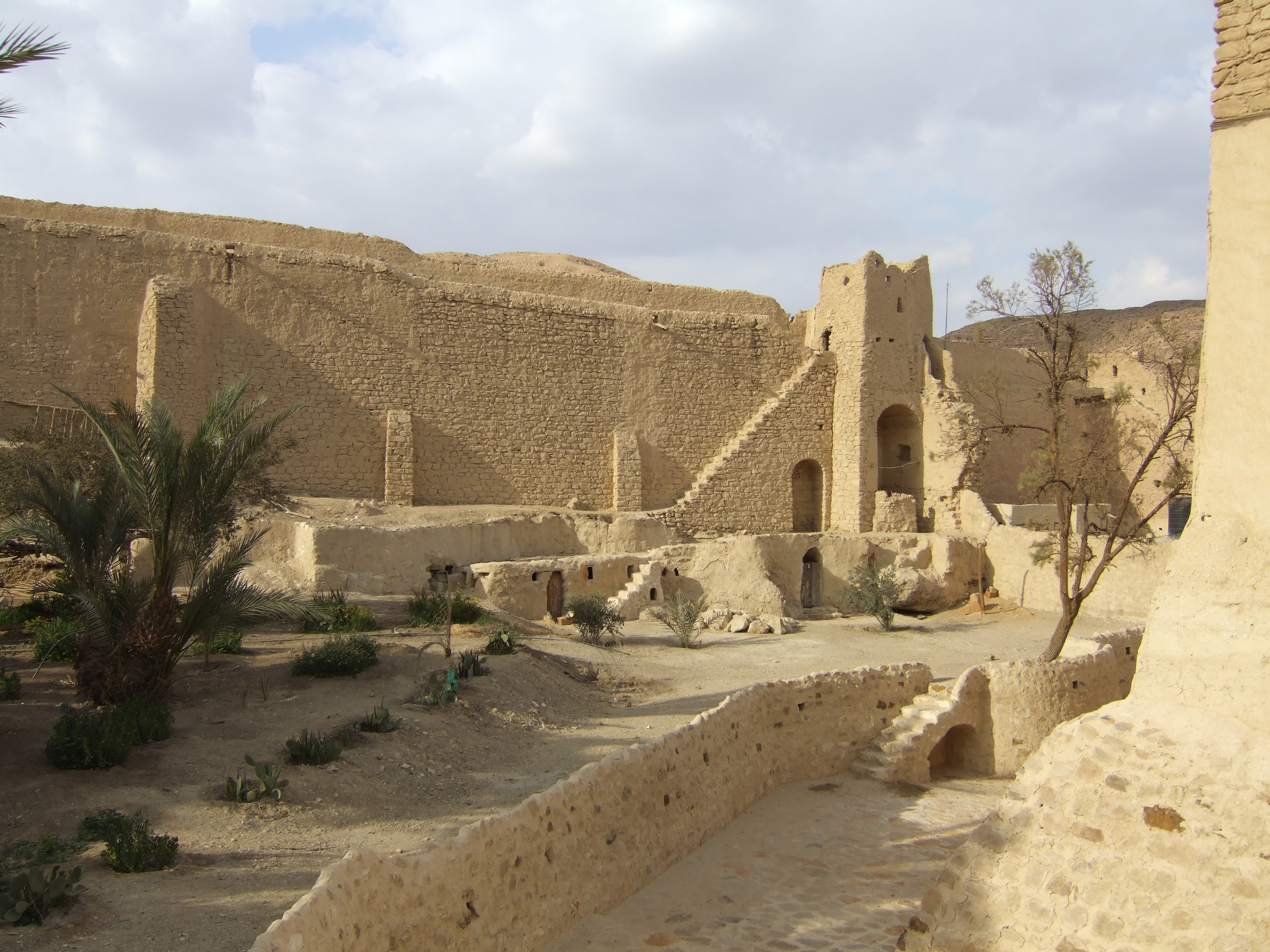
St. Paul Coptic Orthodox Monastery - (Eastern Desert)

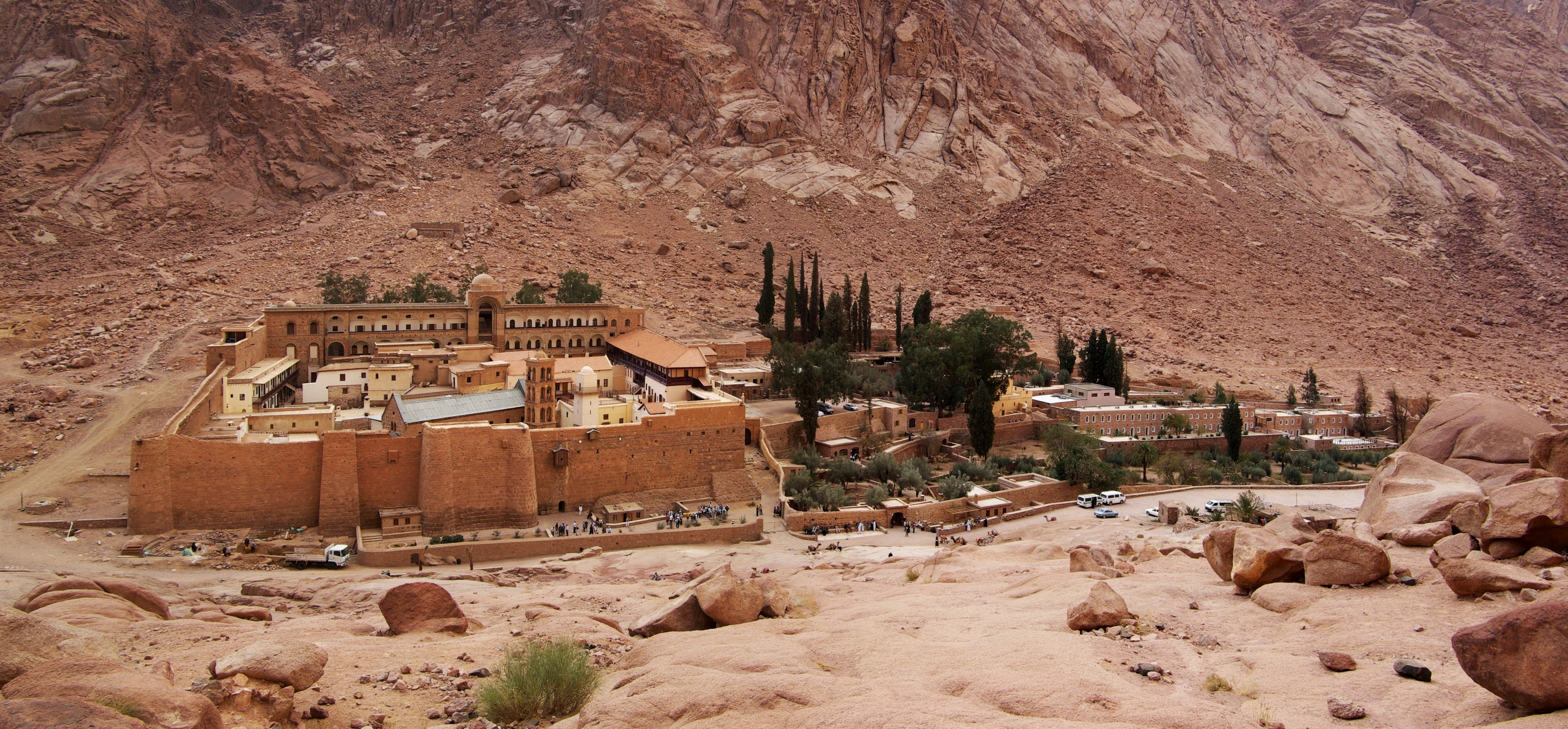
St. Catherine Greek Orthodox Monastery - (Saint Catherine)

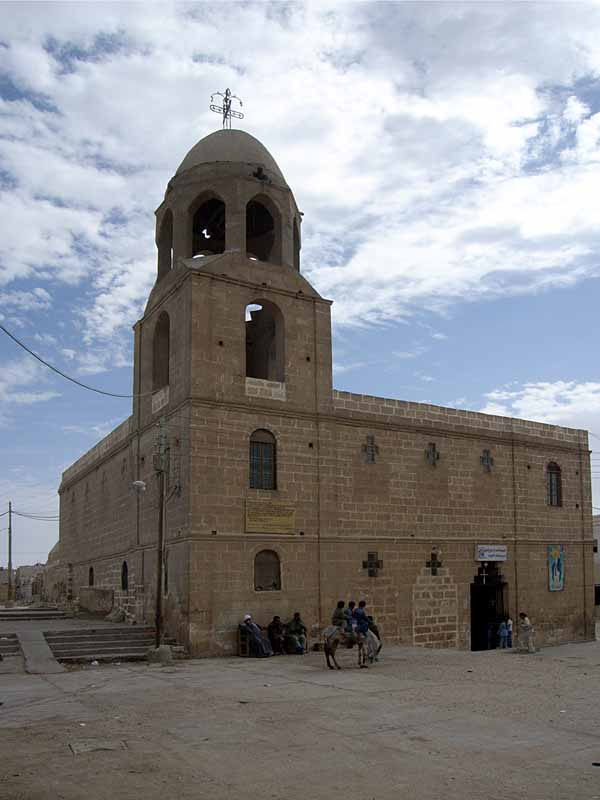
Holy Virgin Mary Coptic Orthodox Monastery - (Minya)

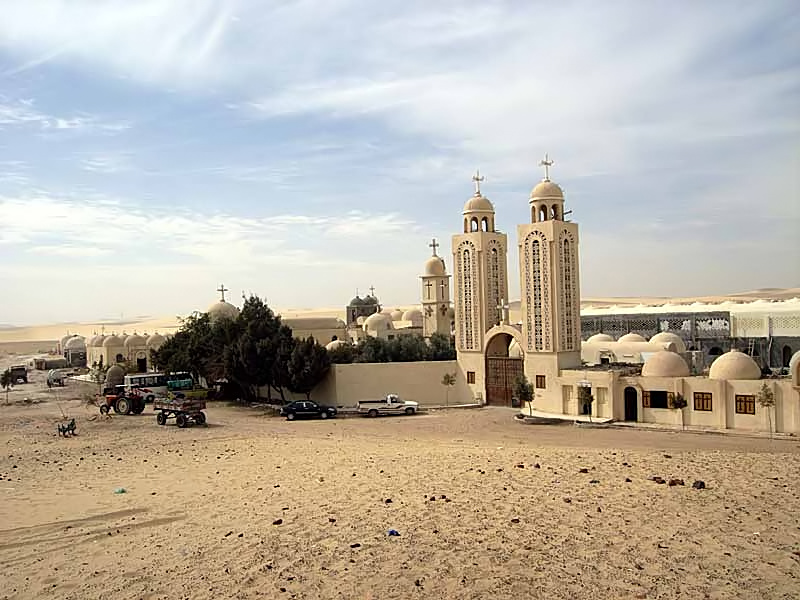
St. Fana Coptic Orthodox Monastery - (Minya)

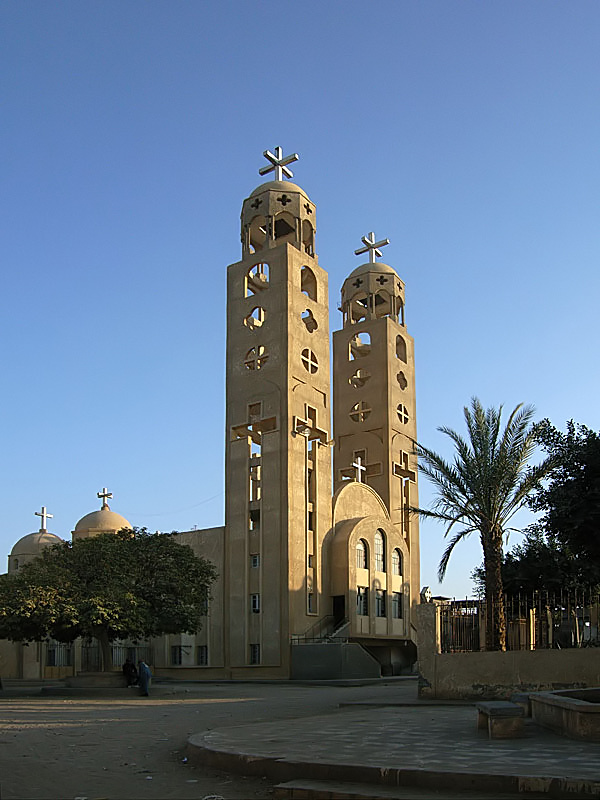
St. Pishoy Coptic Orthodox Monastery - (Deir el-Bersha)

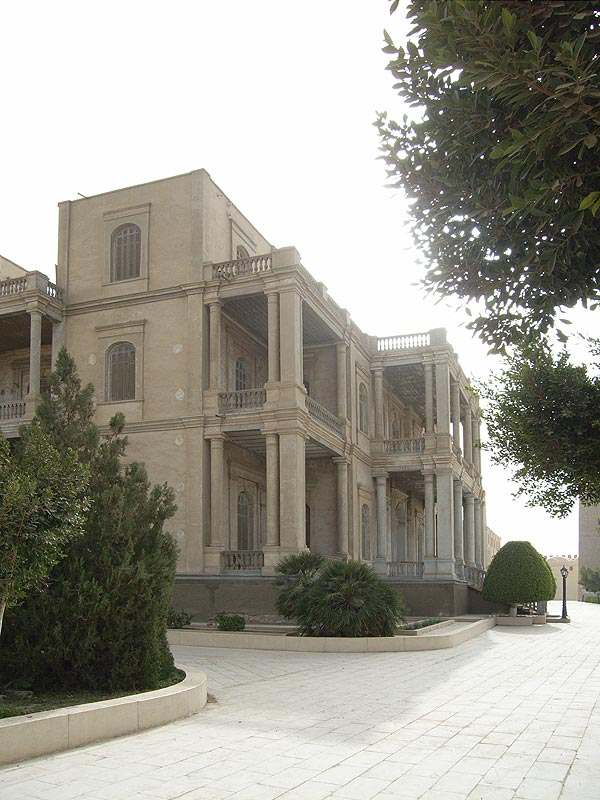
Holy Virgin Mary Coptic Orthodox Monastery - (El-Qusiya)

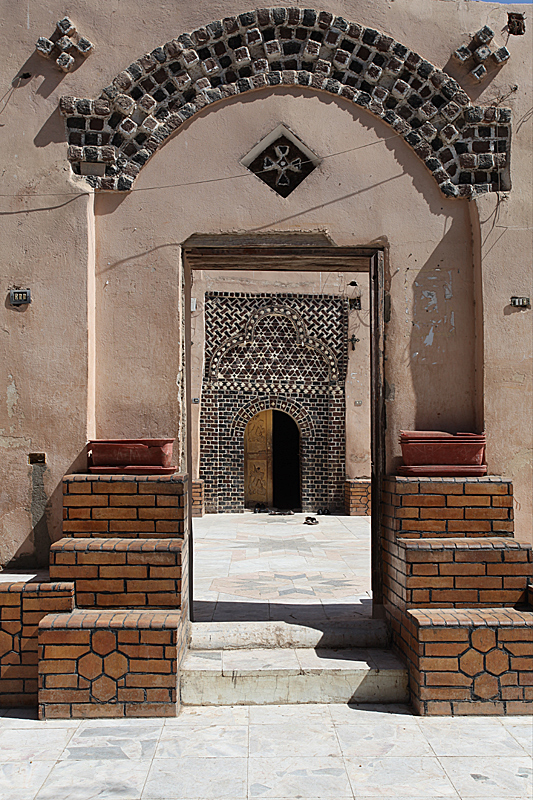
St. George (Dair al-Hadid) Coptic Orthodox Monastery - (Akhmim)

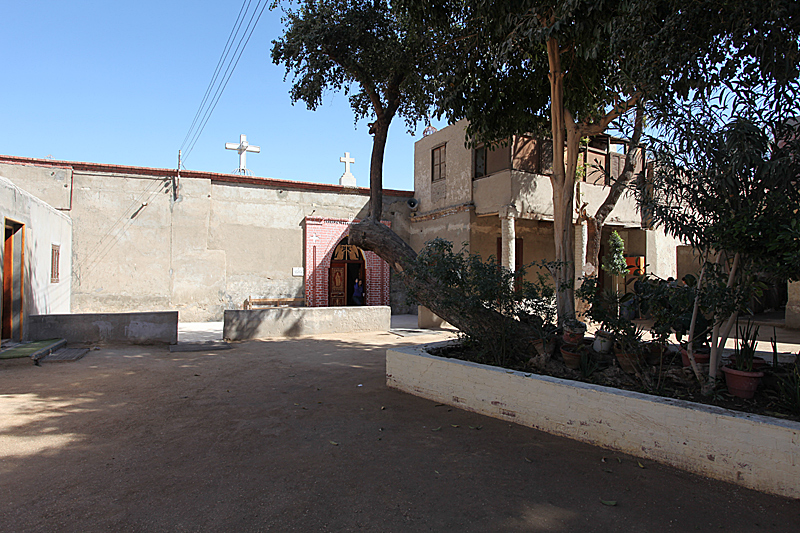
St. Pisada Coptic Orthodox Monastery - (Akhmim)

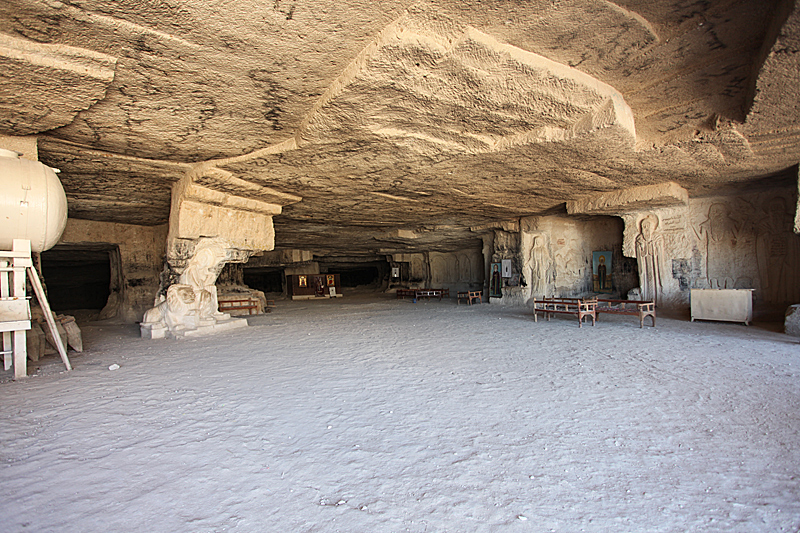
St. Shenouda Shrine - (Sohag)

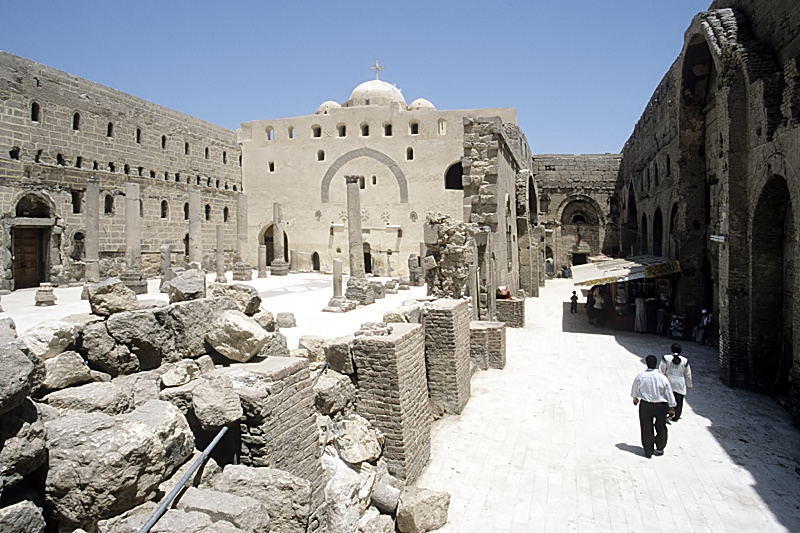
St. Shenouda Coptic Orthodox Monastery - (Sohag)

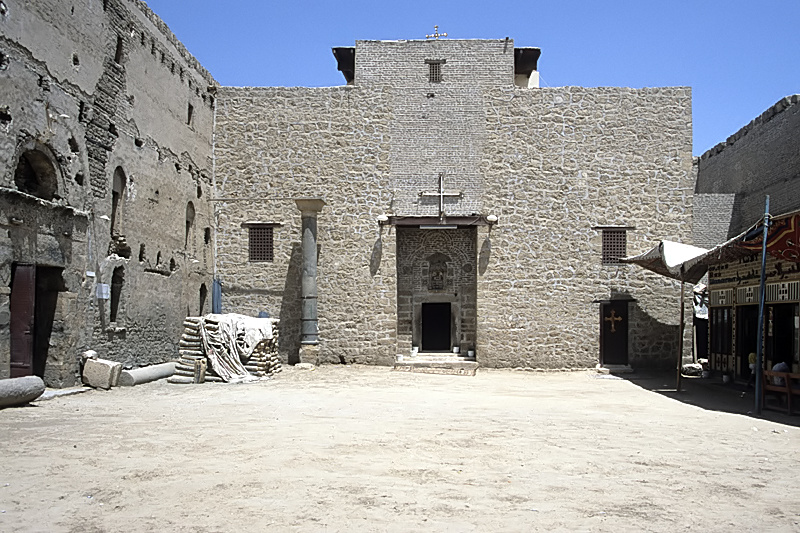
St. Pishay Coptic Orthodox Monastery - (Sohag)

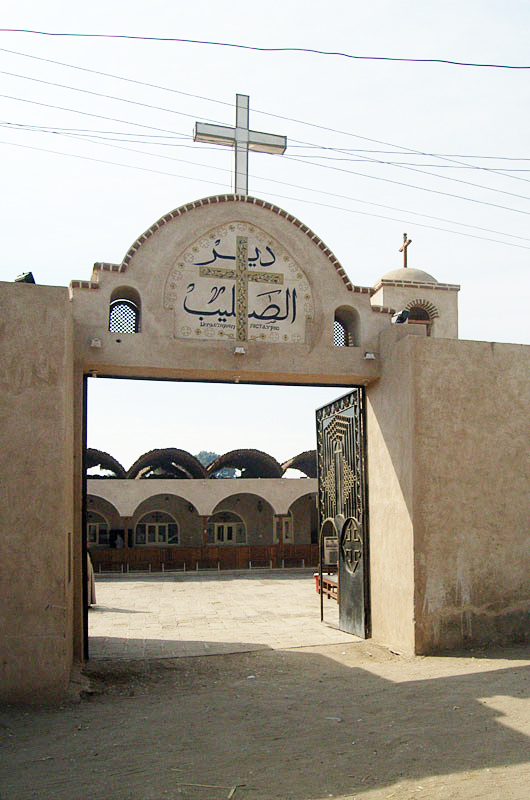
Holy Cross Coptic Orthodox Monastery - (Qena)

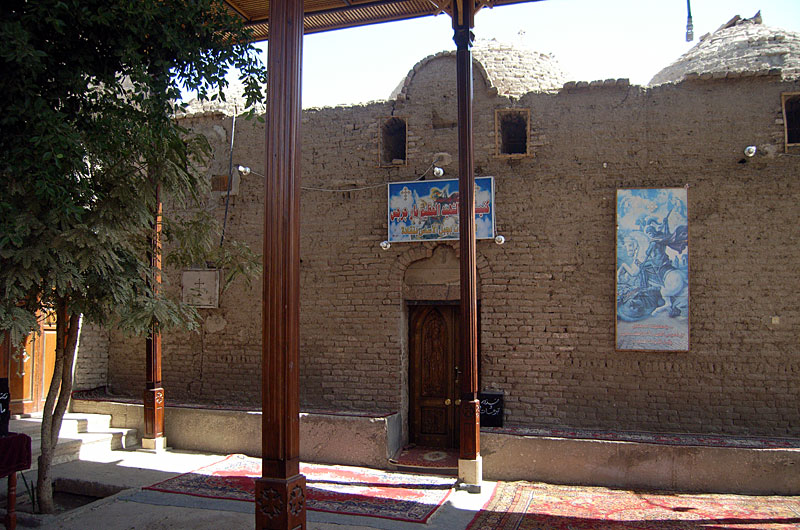
St. George Coptic Orthodox Monastery - (Qena)

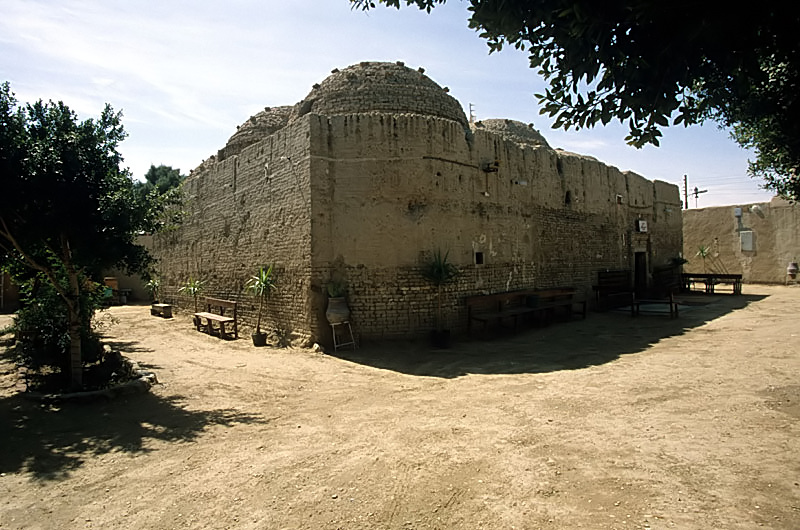
St. Pisentius Coptic Orthodox Monastery - (Qena)

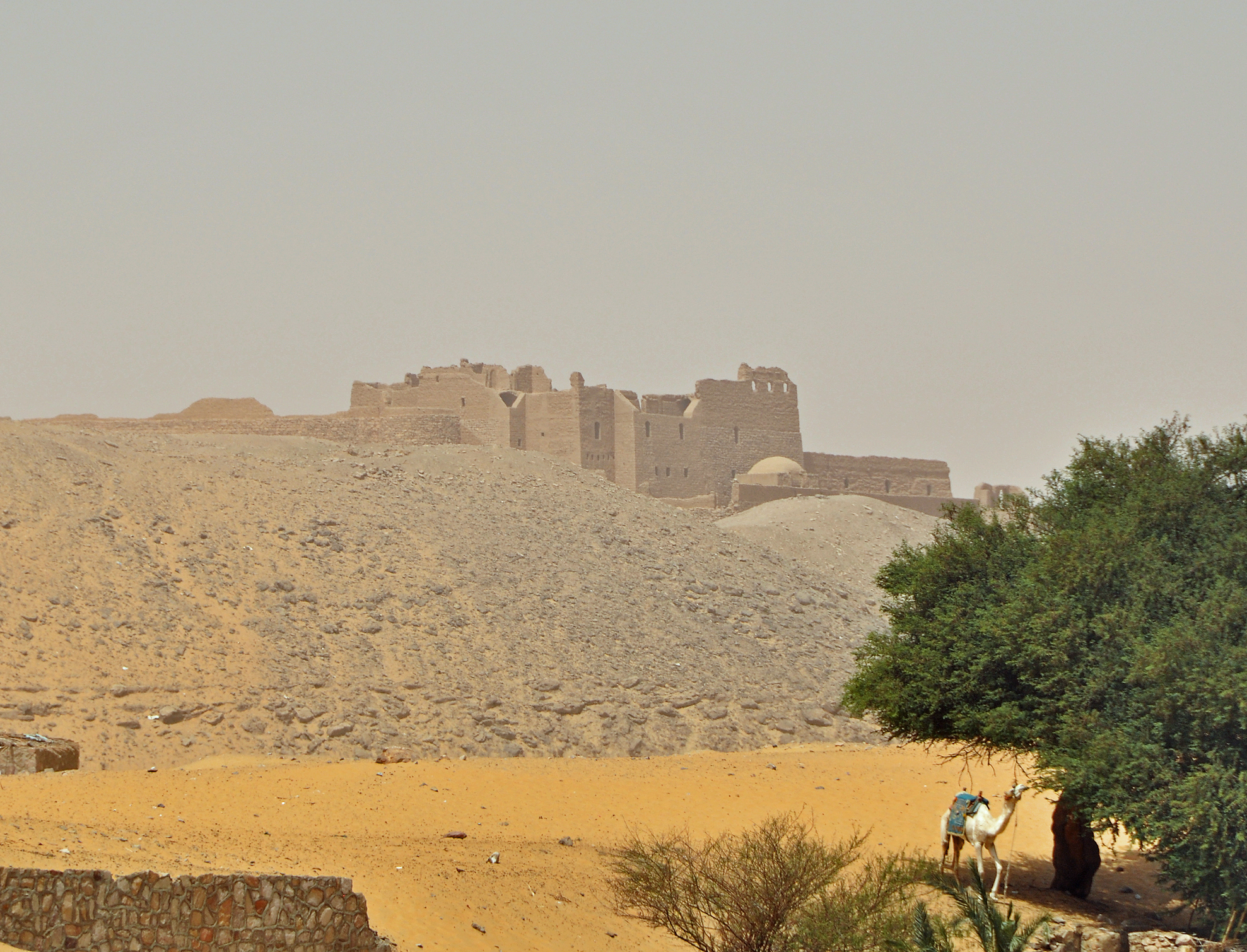
St. Simeon Coptic Orthodox Monastery - (Aswan)

== See also ==
- List of Coptic Orthodox Churches in the United States
- Coptic monasticism
- Coptic Orthodox Church of Alexandria
