= Saint Fana =

Egyptian saint

Saint Fana, also known as Abu Fana, Abu Fanah, or Apa Bane (Coptic: ⲡⲓⲁⲅⲓⲟⲥ ⲃⲁⲛⲉ; c. 354–395) was a Coptic hermit. The Monastery of Saint Fana in the diocese of Mallawi, Upper Egypt, is named after him.

Saint Fana was born to a Christian family in Memphis, Egypt. He became an anchorite due to the inspiration of the Western Desert hermits he visited as a young man.

Ancient sources such as Sozomen's Church History (Historia Ecclesiastica) make reference to a hermit called Benus or Banus who can be identified as Saint Fana, and who lived in the area where the monastery of Saint Fana was later built.

Fana also became noted for his knowledge of the Psalms and would ultimately be linked to miracles.

He is noted for his asceticism and concern for the poor. He also reportedly predicted the date of Theodosius I's death. The Monastery of Saint Fana is one of the oldest in Egypt.

== See also ==
- Abu Mena
- Monastery of Saint Fana
