= Monica Hanna =

Egyptian Egyptologist

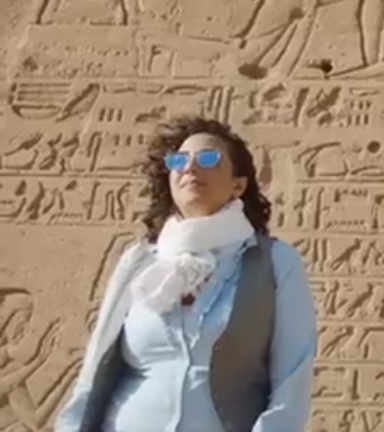
- In a Google video in 2020
- Education: American University in Cairo; University of Pisa
- Occupation: Egyptologist

Monica Hanna (Arabic: مونيكا حنّا) is an Egyptian Egyptologist and campaigner, dean at the Arab Academy for Science, Technology & Maritime Transport. She campaigns against looting and theft of historical Egyptian artefacts, and has called for the return of Egyptian objects held in museums abroad.

== Career ==
Hanna studied Egyptology and Archaeological Chemistry at the American University in Cairo. She joined the University of Pisa, Italy to complete a PhD in archaeology on "Problems of Preservation of Mural Paintings in the Theban Necropolis: A Pilot Study on the Theban Tomb 14 using 3D Scanning Techniques".

In 2013, Hanna filmed footage of the Mallawi Museum after it had been vandalised and looted, during the 2012–2013 Egyptian protests, including mummies being set on fire. She rescued some of the artefacts, and told news reporters that the increasing tendency for Egyptians to go looting was "out of control". The following year, Hanna co-founded the Egyptian Heritage Task Force, a grassroots organisation that tracks the theft and looting of items across Egypt, and built up a presence on social media such as Twitter to help manage this.

In 2020, she opposed the movement of sphinxes from the Temple of Karnak, Luxor to Tahrir Square, Cairo, saying it would cause potential damage and disrupt the "historical integrity of Karnak temple". She is a strong advocate of returning Egyptian artefacts held overseas back to the country. In 2022, she opposed the presence of the Rosetta Stone in the British Museum, saying it rightfully belongs to Egypt and its presence there " is a symbol of Western cultural violence". A petition started by her attracted signatures from around 2,500 archaeologists. The following year, she helped two men take extensive 3D pictures of the stone, so it could be re-created as a non-fungible token. She has called for the return of the bust of Queen Nefertiti held at the Egyptian Museum of Berlin.

== Awards ==
In 2014, Hanna was awarded the Saving Antiquities for Everyone (SAFE), in recognition of her work in identifying Egyptian artifacts looted or removed from their historical locations.

== Selected works ==
- Hanna, Monica, 2015. "Documenting Looting Activities in Post-2011 Egypt." Countering Illicit Traffic in Cultural Goods: The Global Challenge of Protecting the World’s Heritage. Paris: ICOM, pp. 47–63.
- Monica Hanna, “What Has Happened to Egyptian Heritage after the 2011 Unfinished Revolution?,” Journal of Eastern Mediterranean Archaeology and Heritage Studies 1, no. 4 (2013): 371–75
- Katherine Blouin, Monica Hanna and Sarah E. Bond, How Academics, Egyptologists, and Even Melania Trump Benefit From Colonialist Cosplay, Hyperallergic, 22 October 2020
- Monica Hanna (2023), "Contesting the Lonely Queen" International Journal of Cultural Property no. 1
