= Monastery of the Archangel Gabriel at Naqlun =

Building in Egypt

Coordinates: 29.194°N 30.877°E

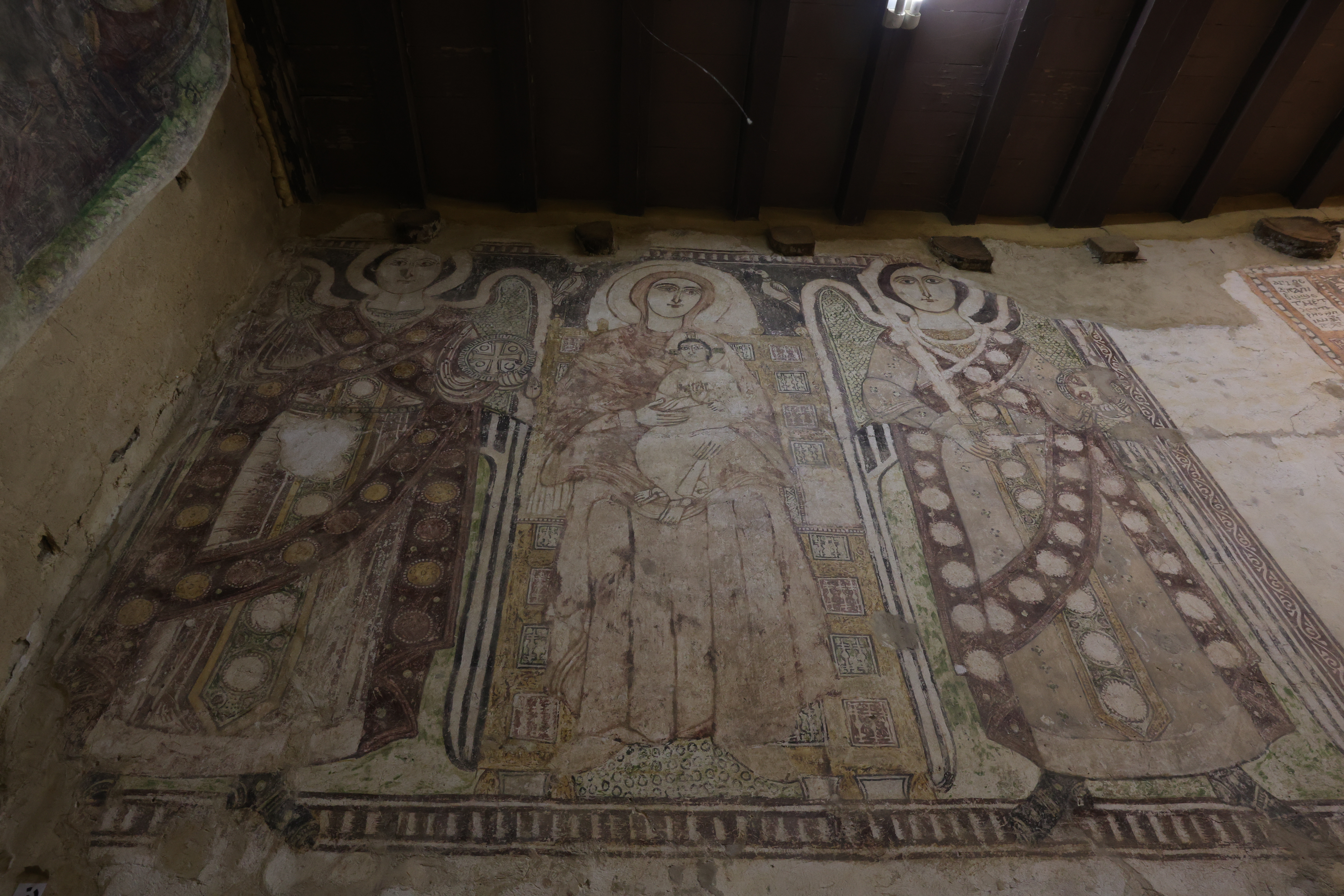
Coptic Fresco of Theotokos and Archangels in Naqlun Monastery

The monastery of the Archangel Gabriel at Naqlun (Arab. دير الملاك غبريال بجبل, Dajr el-Malak Ghubrail, Dayr al-Malāk Ghubriyāl, also: Dajr el-Naqlun, Dayr al-Naqlūn or Dayr Abū al-Khashabah, Dajr Abu al-Chaszaba) – a Coptic monastery of the Archangel Gabriel located in northern Egypt, in the Faiyum Oasis, 16 km south-east of the city of Faiyum in the Libyan Desert. Since 1986, it is investigated by a team of researchers from the Polish Centre of Mediterranean Archaeology University of Warsaw, headed by Prof. Włodzimierz Godlewski. In 1997, the Church of St. Gabriel was restored.

== Architecture and archaeological discoveries ==
The walls of the monastery have been preserved both in the outer and inner courtyards. The Church of St. Gabriel has three sanctuaries, dedicated to the Archangel Gabriel, the Holy Virgin, and St. George. The site also encompasses 90 rock-cut hermitages and the surrounding architecture from different periods. The monastery has been functioning since the 5th century to the present day, but its organization changed with time.

Polish archaeologists also discovered two Christian necropolises. Cemetery C, with more than 180 graves, is located to the west of the monastic complex and was used in the 6th–7th century. Cemetery A contains about 500 burials dated from the 11th to the 13th century. Numerous fragments of textiles have been preserved in the graves.

The excavations also yielded about 1,000 texts in Greek, Coptic, and Arabic, as well as one text in Latin, which has been identified as a fragment of Livy's History of Rome.

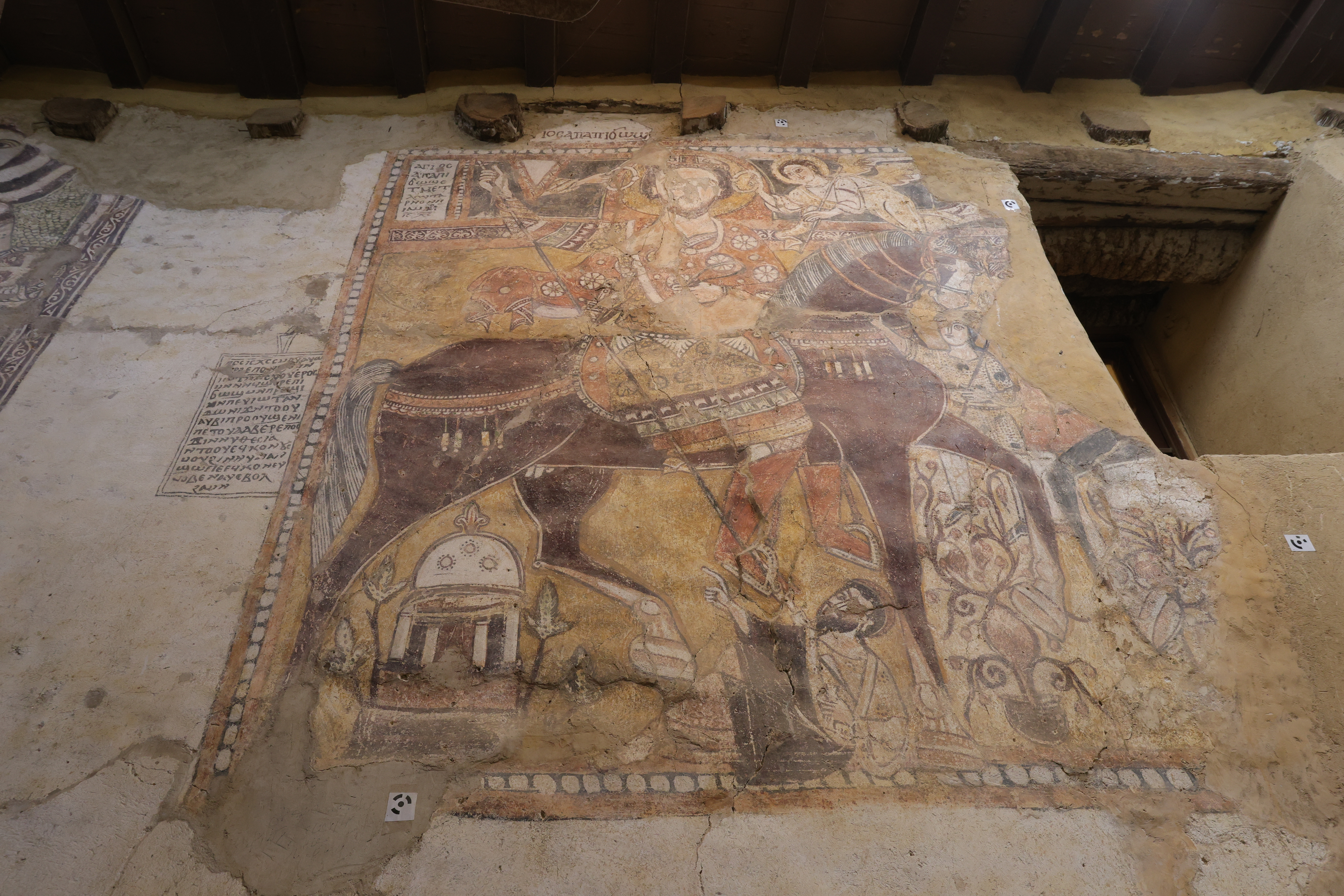
Fresco of St.Pikosh in Deir el Naqlun. The name of this saint "Pikosh" is rendered as "Pekysis" in Greek. The theme of the fresco is identical to the iconographies of St.Mercurius.

The wooden ceiling of the Church of the Archangel Gabriel was decorated with polychromies. Depictions of the Archangel Gabriel, St. Mercurius, St. George, the Holy Virgin, Christ, Psote (Bisada), and St. Simeon Stylites dated to the 11th century were uncovered on its walls. Wall paintings of the Holy Virgin and the Apostles adorned the central apse.
