= Saint Matthew the Potter =

Egyptian Christian saint of the 8th century

Saint Matthew the Potter, also known as Saint Matthew the Poor, is an Egyptian Christian saint of the 8th century. He was contemporary of Pope Alexander II of Alexandria (704 AD - 729 AD). According to Abu al-Makarim, Saint Matthew the Potter may have also been Coptic Orthodox bishop of the city of Esna. He is the founder of the Monastery of Saint Matthew the Potter.

== Life ==
Saint Matthew the Potter was originally from Bishnoi in Egypt. He received his early training as a monk at the Church of the Holy Virgin Mary at al-Maqbabat. After completing his training as a monk, he traveled to Esna then to Asfun, where he founded a monastery that came to be known as the Monastery of Saint Matthew the Potter.

== Monastery ==
The Monastery of Saint Matthew the Potter was destroyed in the 10th century by the Bedouin Arabs during one of their many raids on the Nile Valley and on Christian monasteries. Although it was rebuilt, the monastery became deserted a while later. It has been newly re-inhabited by Coptic Orthodox monks since 1975.

== See also ==
- Monastery of Saint Matthew the Potter
- Coptic Orthodox Church
- Coptic monasticism
