= Monastery of Saint Fana =

Coptic Orthodox monastery in Middle Egypt

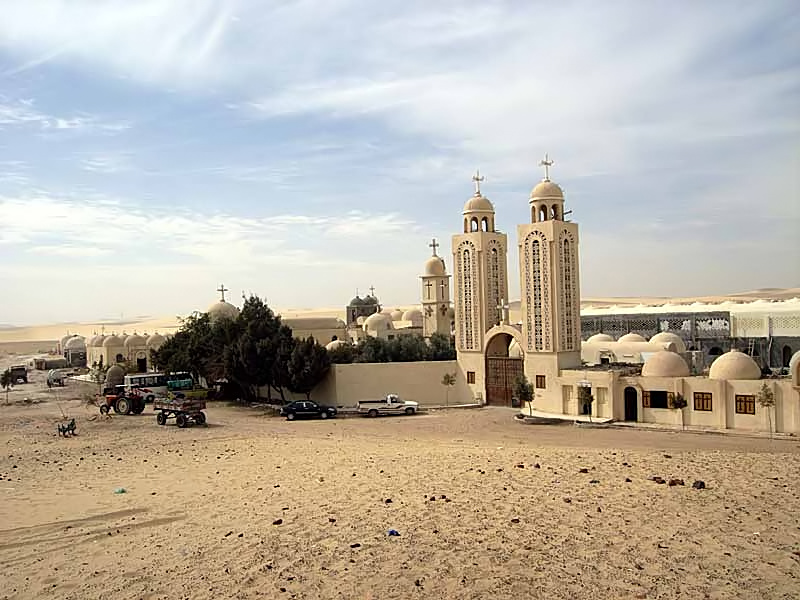

- Location within Egypt

Monastery information
- Other name: Deir Abu Fanah
- Established: 12th century
- Dedication: Saint Fana
- Diocese: Coptic Orthodox Church of Alexandria

People
- Important associated figures: Pope Theodosius III of Alexandria; Pope Matthew I of Alexandria

Site
- Location: Qasr Hur, Minya Governorate
- Country: Egypt
- Coordinates: 28.3929°N 30.4432°E
- Public access: Yes
- Website: https://www.qasrhur.com

The Monastery of Saint Fana is a Coptic Orthodox monastery. It is named after Saint Fana, also known as Bane (c. 354–395), Coptic Christian hermit. The monastery is sometimes called the Monastery of Abu Fanah and is also known as the Monastery of the Cross, due to the presence of many beautifully decorated crosses inside its church.

== Location ==
The monastery is situated in the Western Desert, not far from the cultivated land of the Nile. The monastery is located in Minya Governorate about 300 km south of Cairo, northwest of Hermopolis around 2 kilometres (1.2 mi) from the village of Qasr Hur and east of the village of Beni Khaled.

== Foundation and history ==
The monastery was most likely built around the burial site of Saint Fana. His tomb was found during excavations of an international team representing seven European academic institutions and led by Austrian scholar Prof. Dr. Helmut Buschhausen in 1992.

The 12th-century historian Abu al-Makarim mentions the church of Saint Fana, which was restored by al-Rashid Abu Fadl. Egyptian historian of the 14th–15th century al-Maqrizi wrote about the monastery's fine architecture.

The history of the Patriarchs of Alexandria mentions the monastery of Saint Fana twice, first in relation to the election of Pope Theodosius III of Alexandria of the Coptic Orthodox Church, 1294–1300 and second to the childhood of Pope Matthew I of Alexandria, 1378–1408.

In pre-Islamic times, the monastery reportedly numbered some 1000 monks. The monastery's numbers had drastically dwindled before the arrival of Islam in the seventh century. Al-Maqrizi reports that during his day, the monastery held only two monks. The French Jesuit priest Father Michel Marie Jullien (1827–1911) reported that the priest of the neighboring village Qasr Hur had cleared the church of debris and used the church for the Divine Liturgy.

When German scholar Otto Friedrich August Meinardus visited the monastery in the 1960s, the place was in ruins with remains stretching over a wide area. Only the historical church survived. Pieces of gray granite were also found, suggesting that the monastery may have been built on the location where an ancient temple once stood. On a small hill stand the ruins of a qasr, or tower, which ancient monasteries had. Approximately 80 meters from the ruined monastery one finds the cave of Saint Fana, the location where he reportedly lived. Meinardus does not report on the monastery being inhabited.

The surviving old monastic building consists of an ancient basilica, deeply sunk into the sand in the center of a vast mound that, according to the Coptic Encyclopedia, "no doubt" conceals the ruins of the Monastery. The neighboring mounds perhaps conceal isolated cells or hermitages.

== Modern history ==
The modern history of the monastery starts with a renewed interest shown by the Coptic Orthodox Church in this monastery after the excavations of the team of Dr. Helmut Buschhausen in 1987–1993. Following these excavations, the Egyptian Ministry of Culture decided in the year 2002 to declare an area of 1 km by 2 km as the archaeological periphery of the monastery. The Department of Antiquities suspects that this land may hold buried historical remains. _{see map}

After the Department of Antiquities decision, the Coptic Orthodox Church built new cells, a new entrance, a reception and a large cathedral just outside the boundaries of the archaeological periphery _{see photo –(monastic buildings built from the year 2000 onwards)}. Prior to 1999, no monks resided permanently in the monastery. Five monks came to the monastery in 1999, and in 2003, Pope Shenouda, head of the Coptic Orthodox Church, consecrated an additional 12 monks, followed later by one more monk. From 2003 onwards there have been repeatedly conflicts over land with neighbors of the monastery. In July 2008 there are a total of 18 monks and 9 novices residing in the monastery, who are assisted by tens of laymen.

== Tensions ==
On 31 May 2008, monks and Christians close to the Monastery of Saint Fana reported that monks' cells and a church belonging to the monastery had been attacked by a group of roughly sixty armed Arabs, a name commonly used in Egypt for Bedouins who have settled in villages bordering the desert The location they show is an outpost of the monastery with monastic cells and a chapel dedicated to Cyril of Alexandria_{see photo –(extension of the monastery that was attacked)}. The attacks resulted in damage to this section of the monastery and its surrounding property.

The subsequent attack left one Muslim killed, four Christians wounded, and three monks being briefly kidnapped, requiring hospital treatment upon their return. The three kidnapped monks were tortured by the Arabs, who also tried unsuccessfully to force them to spit on crosses and to pronounce the Islamic Shahada. In addition, the Arabs burned Bibles and church altars inside the monastery. The clashes were followed one day later by a demonstration of around 300 Coptic youth in Mallawi who blamed the government for "inaction in the face of repeated attacks by Muslims against their community."

13 Muslims and two Christians who were allegedly involved were arrested and brought before the prosecutor-general. Governor Ahmed Dia el-Din found a number of police reports documenting disputes over land that span several years. Saint Fana's Monastery had obtained a portion of their land by employing "urfi" contracts, resulting in the governor's rejection of the monastery's claim to possess valid land titles.

"Urfi" contracts, are agreements between two parties that lack the proper registration with the government, contracts that are drafted without first obtaining the required governmental permits. Monks of the monastery criticized local police, stationed approximately 6 kilometres (3.7 mi) from the monastery, for arriving at the monastery several hours after having been informed of the attack. Coptic activists abroad, both during and following the attack, were contacted by monks and laymen in and close to the monastery. They responded by posting angry responses on the Internet and holding several demonstrations in North America and Europe.

Many Copts, both those living in the diocese of Mallawi, the diocese the Monastery belongs to, and Coptic activists in the West, alleged that Muslims attempted to force the three kidnapped monks to convert to Islam by declaring the Shahada. Many YouTube productions followed, statements were made, press releases were published, all placing the conflict in a sectarian context, rarely making references to conflicting land claims and if this is done, it is often done to explicitly deny that a land conflict played a role.

The responses from monks, Christian workers in the monastery, and Coptic activists in the West encouraged hundreds of Christians to demonstrate in Mallawi, a Middle Egyptian town which is the seat of the Bishop of Mallawi who is also the abbot of the Monastery of Saint Fana. Demonstrations of Christians in Egypt is a relatively new phenomenon. Christian protesters in Mallawi chanted "With our blood and soul, we will defend the Cross.".

The attack on the monastery and the ensuing Coptic response in and outside Egypt was prominently reported in Egypt. Heated discussions following the attack were published in the Egyptian media for many weeks following the attack.

Coptic monks and Copts close to the Monastery of Saint Fana placed the attack in a sectarian context which was echoed on several Coptic websites in the West. Coptic leader Pope Shenouda stated that the assailants did not want the monks to cultivate the desert land they legally possess. "These (assailants – referring to the Muslim Arab neighbors of the Monastery) do not have any one to rule them," Pope Shenouda said in a statement criticizing the Egyptian government for not being able to control the Monastery's Arab neighbors. Pope Shenouda's statement came very close to calling the conflict "sectarian". The Holy Synod of the Coptic Orthodox Church called on the Egyptian President Muhammad Husni Mubarak to intervene to prevent a repetition of similar assaults. Egyptian media quoted Egyptian officials explicitly denying that this conflict was of a sectarian or religious nature. Egyptian journalist Muhammad al-Baz reports in El Fagr that the attack against the Monastery of Saint Fana was not the first of its kind, and that attacks have been carried out since 2005, but denies that there was a sectarian element to the attacks. Instead, he believes that there were materialistic and financial motives (land ownership) involved. He criticized the monks' allegations that they were targeted because they are Copts. Al Baz claims that the monks pretended that the attacks were of a sectarian nature to obtain people's compassion and prove that they are persecuted.

Amr al-Shubaki stated on 12 June in Al-Masry Al-Youm that the absence of a state of law hurts both Muslims and Christians alike, in the same way that other serious problems such as anarchy and unemployment do. Al-Shubaki referred to the widespread use of urfi agreements and the system of Wad al-Yad – a common practice to obtain land. One does not own the land but nevertheless reclaims it and after doing so for several years the land becomes legally owned by the person cultivating the land.

Coptic intellectual Dr. Samir Morkos believes this is a land-conflict with religious dimensions that were introduced to strengthen partisan positions. He worries about the effect that this dispute may potentially have on grassroots Muslim-Christian relations.

Many foreign media have reported the attack; "Egyptian Christians, Muslims clash, killing one" (Reuters/31 May), "One killed, four injured in Egypt monastery clash," (AFP/31 May). The Los Angeles Times placed the attack in the context of other violence directed against Copts on 11 June. The Washington Post on 7 July reported that attacks such as this one make the Christian Copts of Egypt turn inwards, strengthening a ghetto mentality. Christianity Today (23 July) focused on the growing pressure on land and water.

Arab-West Report (English – Arabic) and the National Council for Human Rights each sent a delegation to the region to investigate the tensions.

== Popes from the Monastery of St. Fana ==
1. Pope Theodosius III of Alexandria (1294-1300)

== Abbot ==
As of 2013, the abbot is Bishop Ava Demetrius.

== See also ==
- Saint Fana
- History of the Patriarchs of Alexandria
- Coptic Orthodox Church
- Al-Maqrizi
- Theodosius II
- Early medieval domes
