= Khatatba =

- Nile Delta - Rosetta Branch, Khatatba (in upper left corner) and greater town Menouf (view from space)

- Location in Egypt
- Coordinates: 30°21′N 30°49′E
- Country: Egypt
- Governorate: Monufia Governorate
- Time zone: UTC+2 (EET)
  - Summer (DST): UTC+3 (EEST)

Khatatba is a town in the Monufia Governorate in Lower Egypt, 43 kilometers north of the Egyptian capital Cairo. It is just above the Khatatba Canal which branches off the Nile River.

== History ==
Historically, the town served the role of a departure point from Cairo to the desert. Khatatba is the site of the Monastery of Saint George or "Dair Mari Girgis." It provides the regional Coptic population as a center for retreats and religious meetings.

Before he was President of Egypt, Gamal Abdel Nasser resided in Khatatba between 1923–24. Khatatba was also the site of the British Army's 8th Armoured Brigade.

== Bibliography ==
- Aburish, Said K. (2004), Nasser, the Last Arab, New York City: St. Martin's Press, ISBN 031228683X
- Meinardus, Otto Friedrich (2002), Two Thousand Years of Coptic Christianity, Cairo: American Univ in Cairo Press, ISBN 9774247574
