= Mallawi Museum =

Of Egyptian antiquities in Mallawi, Minya Governorate

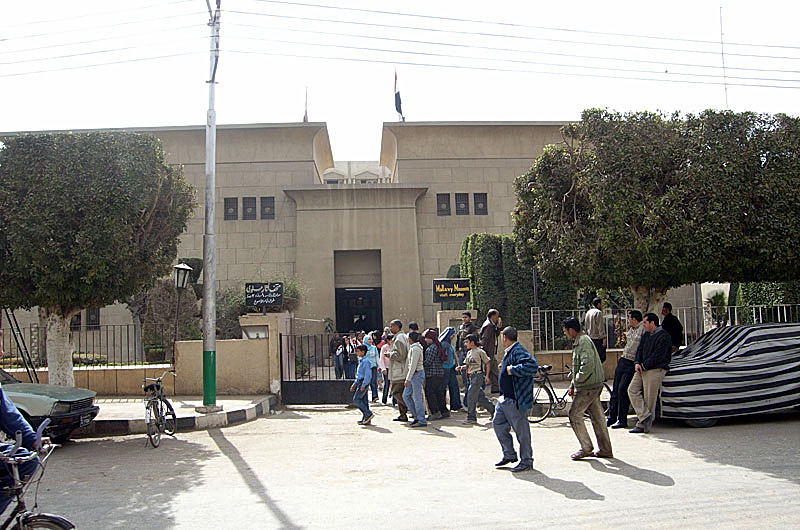
- Mallawi Museum
- Established: 1963
- Location: Minya Governorate, Upper Egypt
- Coordinates: 27°44′08″N 30°50′40″E

Mallawi Museum is a museum of Egyptian antiquities in Mallawi, Minya Governorate, Upper Egypt.

The museum was established in 1963 to house finds from local excavations and held an important collection of ancient Egyptian artefacts until it was looted in August 2013. Over 1000 pieces were stolen or destroyed in the looting but around half of those have since been recovered.
