= Monastery of Saint Matthew the Potter =

Coptic Orthodox monastery in Upper Egypt

Saint Matthew the Potter
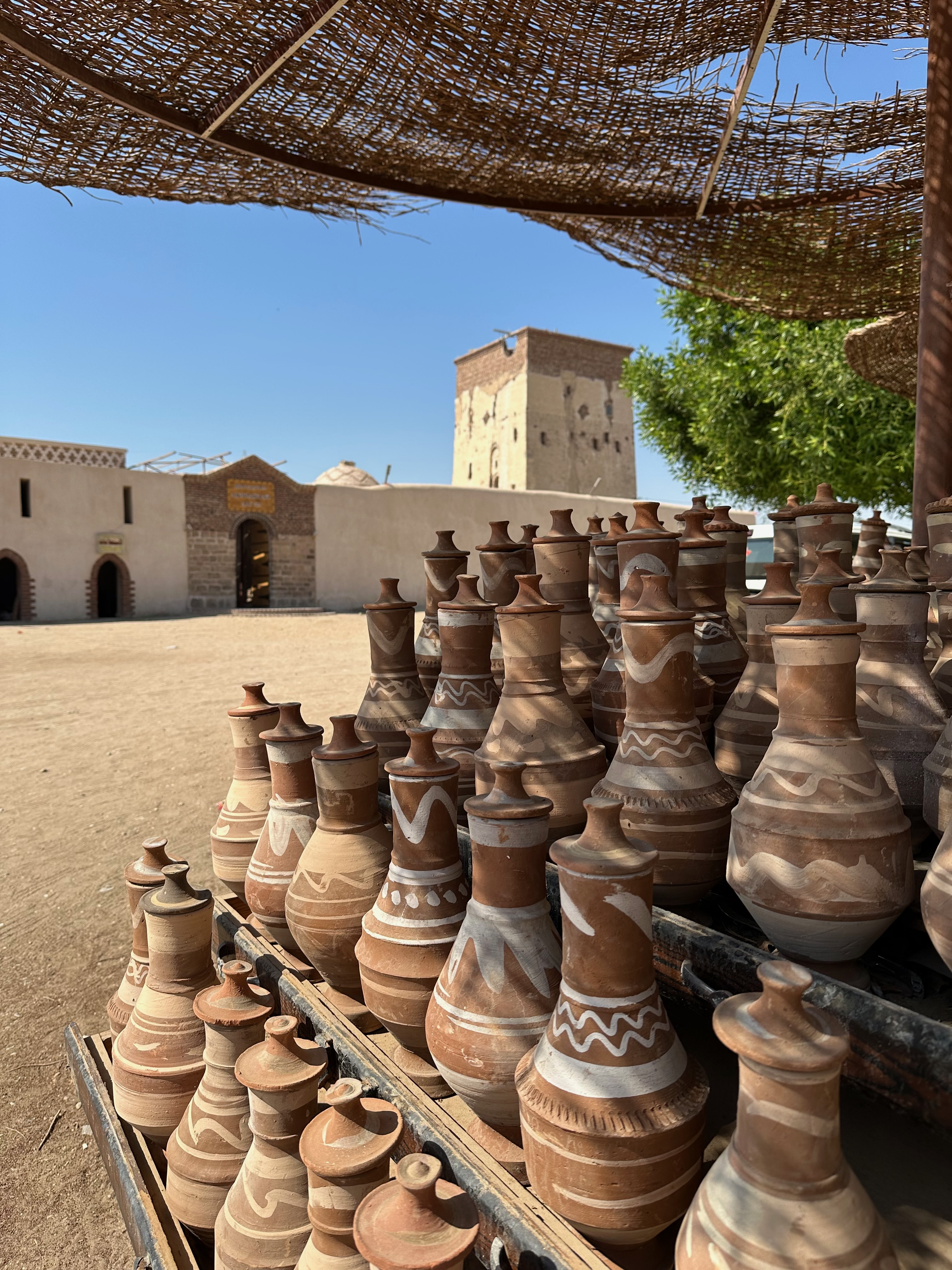

- Location within Egypt
- Interactive map of Saint Matthew the Potter

Monastery information
- Other name: Saint Matthew the Poor
- Established: 704-29
- Dedication: Saint Matthew the Potter
- Diocese: Coptic Orthodox Church of Alexandria

People
- Founder: Saint Matthew the Potter

Site
- Location: Naq 'al-Zinaiqa, Luxor
- Country: Egypt
- Coordinates: 25.37°N 32.480556°E
- Public access: Yes

The Monastery of Saint Matthew the Potter, also known as the Monastery of Saint Matthew the Poor, is a Coptic Orthodox monastery in Upper Egypt. It was founded by a Coptic monk of the same name. It is located in Luxor Governorate near the town of Naq 'al-Zinaiqa, about seven kilometers northwest of the village of Asfun al-Matana near Esna. The monastery is built at the edge of the desert.

== History ==
The monastery was founded some time after the 8th century when St. Matthew the Potter retired into the desert here. Sources indicate that the original monastery was destroyed in the 10th century, but rebuilt in the 11th century. This is when the oldest of the current structures dates from.

It was uninhabited for a period of time, but in 1975, Coptic Orthodox monks reestablished a presence there. Excavations done by French archeologists between the Monastery of Saint Matthew the Poor and the Monastery of the Martyrs have revealed much about the history of Coptic monasticism in this region.

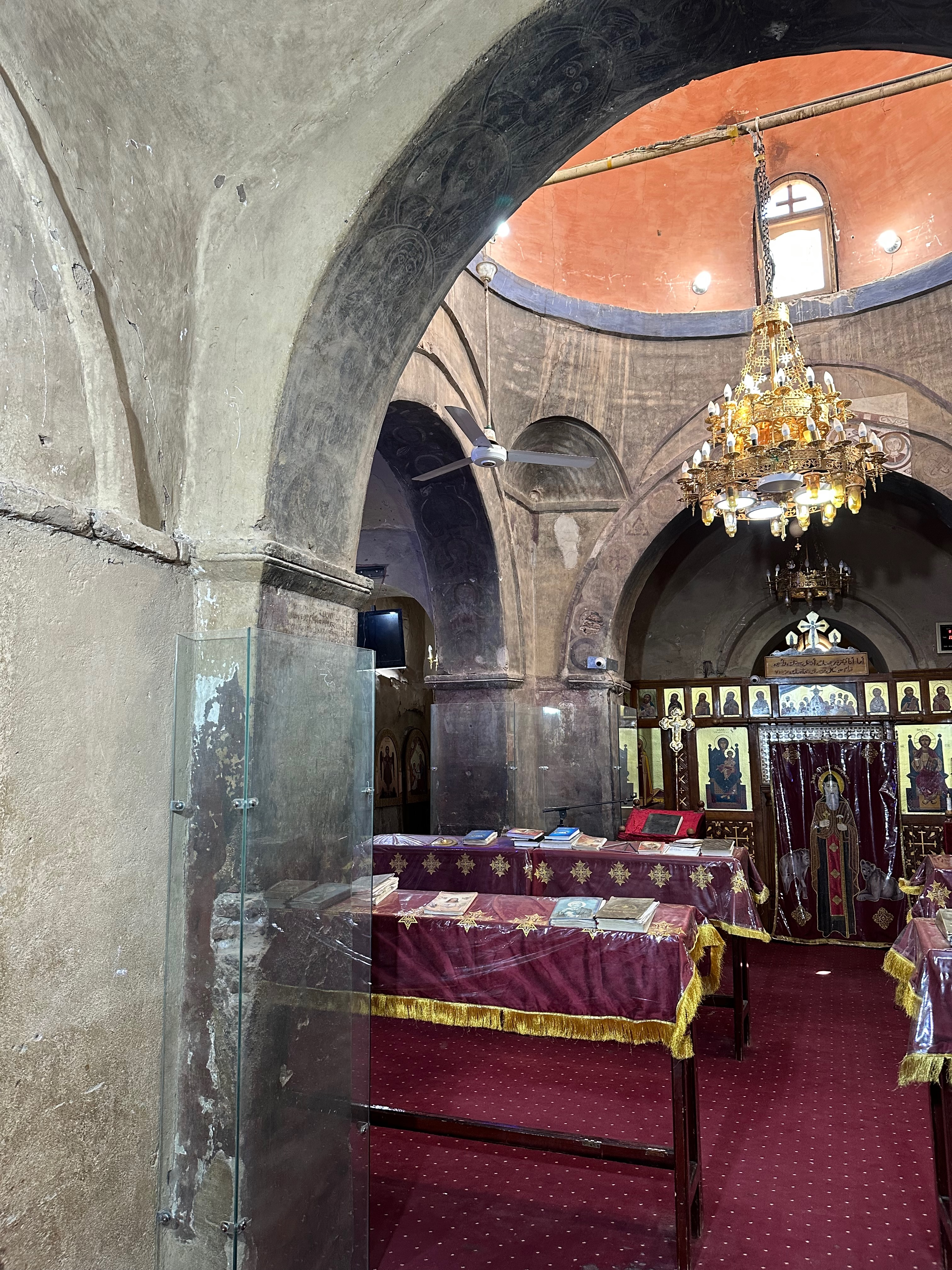
Main dome of 11th century church

In the present day the monastery complex is still actively inhabited; the monks have built new chapels inside and outside the original complex.

== Art and Architecture ==
The 11th century monastery church bears much architecturally in common with the Christian architecture of Nubia. It is sunk into the ground and constructed with no ground-level windows. There are windows in the dome to let in light and provide passive ventilation. There is a large central dome supported by squinches. Surrounding this are smaller ambulatory arches and side chapels.

Artistically, the monastery is noted for the preserved frescoes in its main basilica. These are likely from the 11th-13th centuries and show Jesus and the Apostles, as well as local saints and Nubian kings. The frescoes have been covered by centuries of grime, but are well preserved.

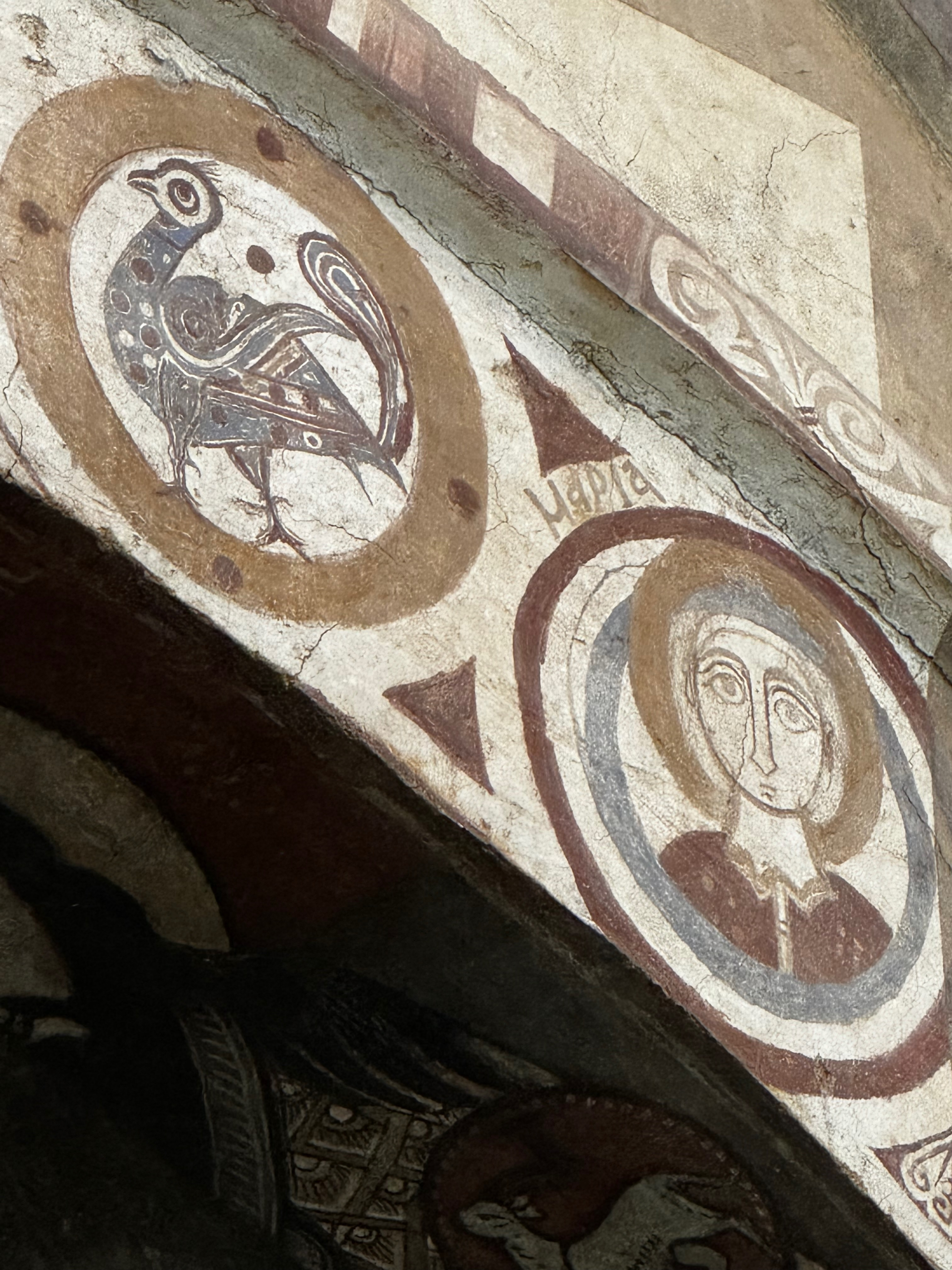

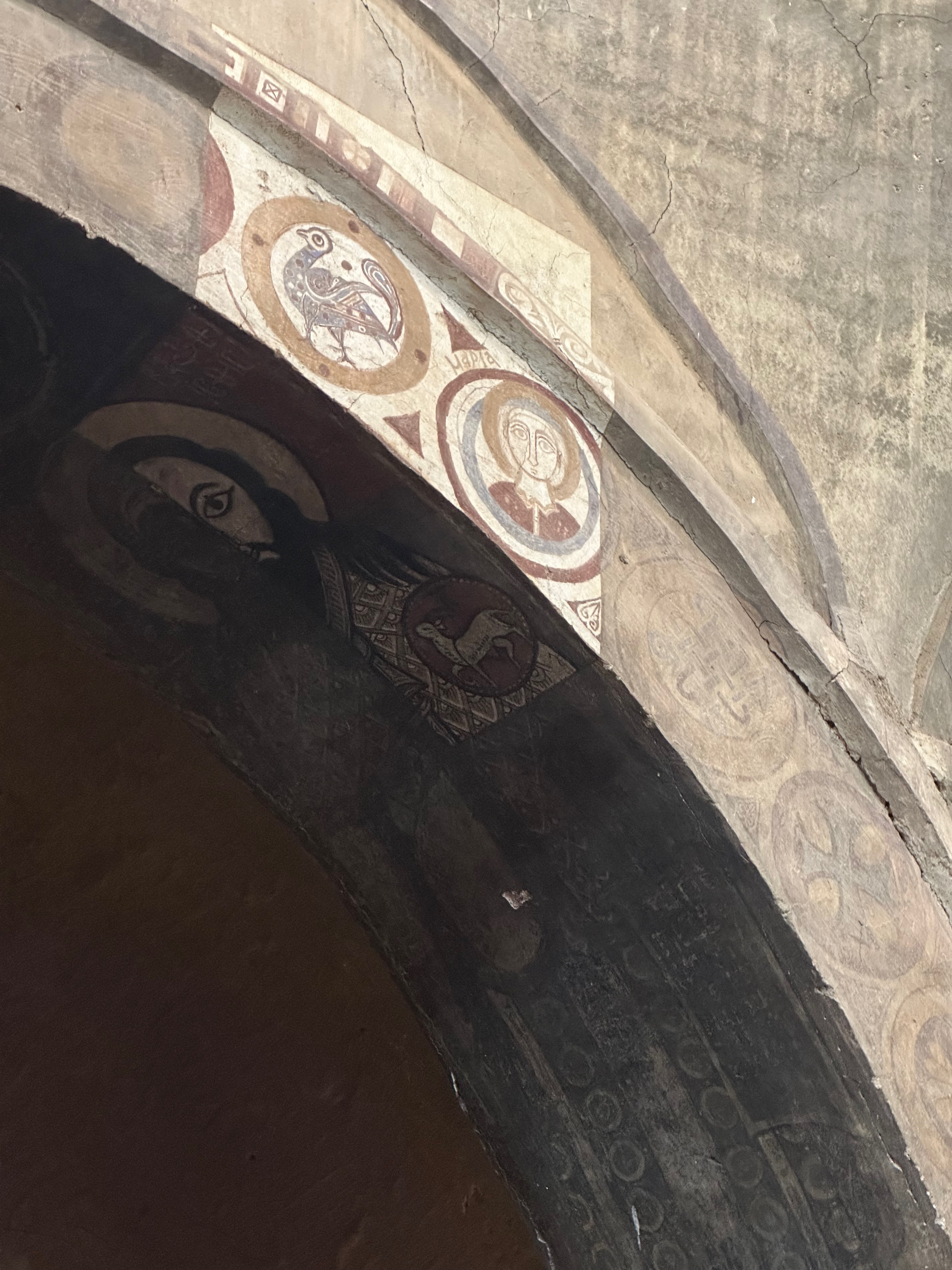

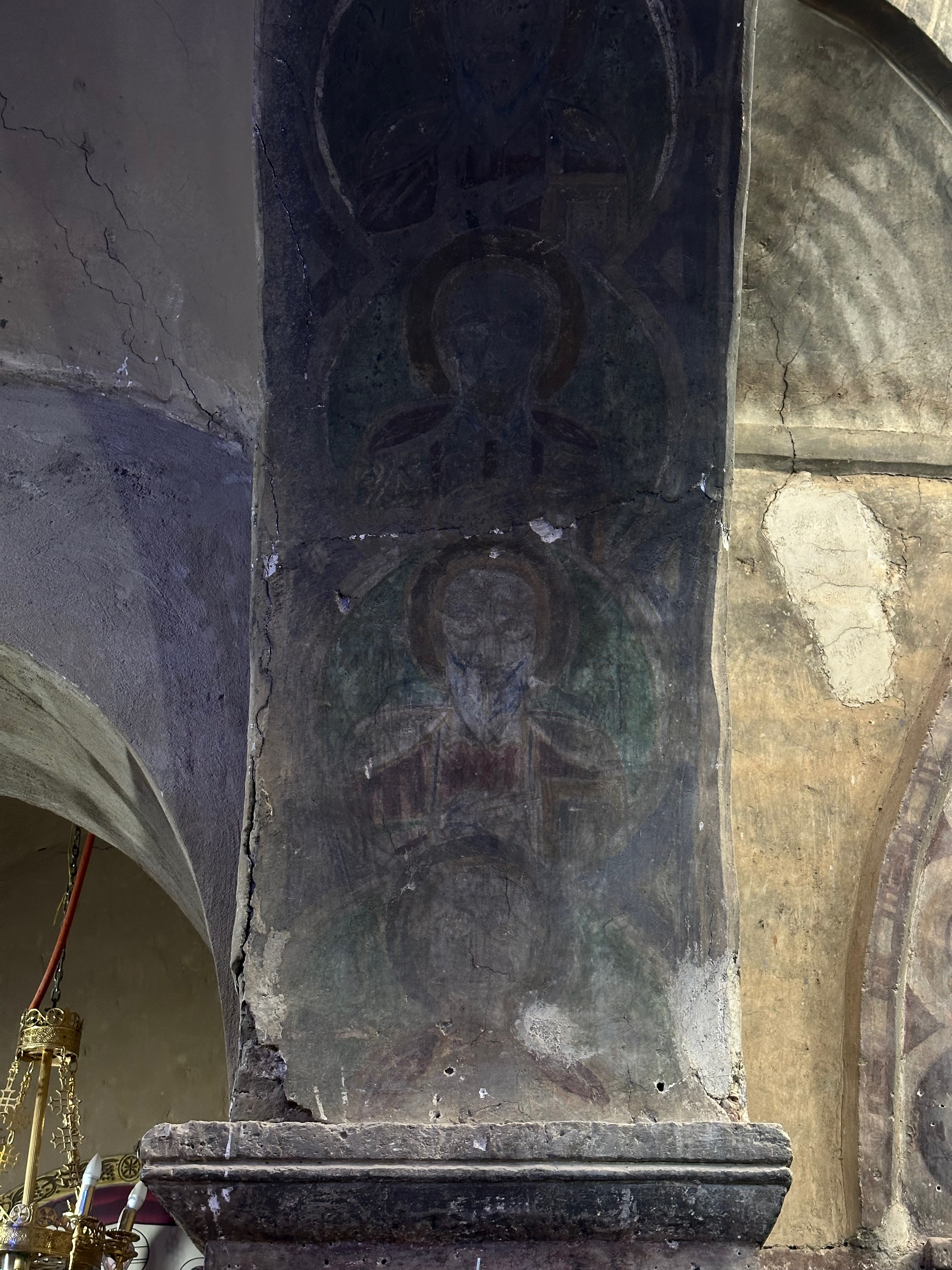

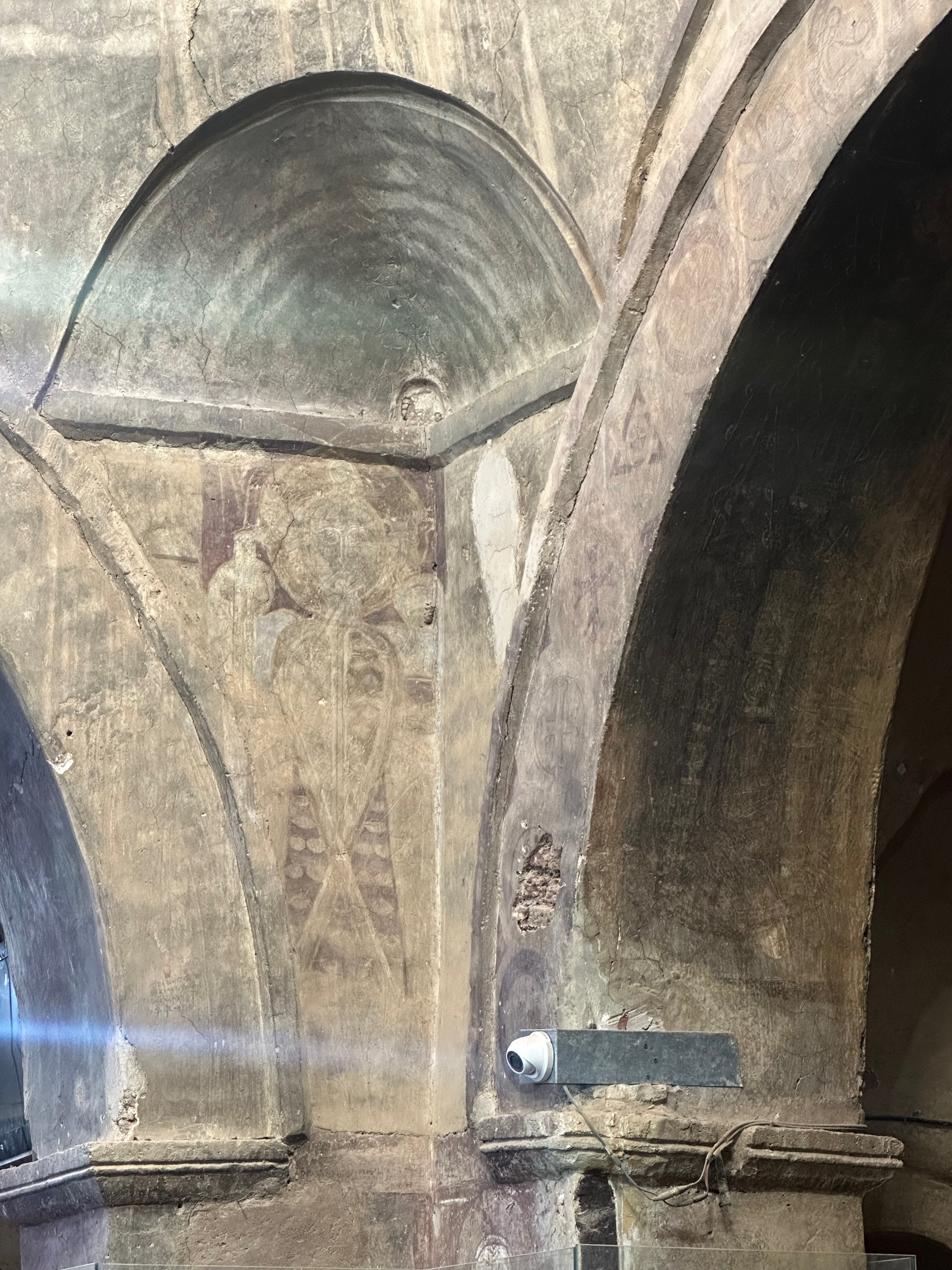
Details of 11th-13th century frescoes.

== See also ==
- Saint Matthew the Potter
- Coptic Orthodox Church
- Coptic monasticism
