= Qasr Hur =

Village in Minya Governorate, Egypt

Qasr Hur قصر هور
- Village
- Location in Egypt
- Coordinates: 27°51′32″N 30°43′51″E
- Country: Egypt
- Governorate: Minya Governorate

Population (2006)
  - Total: 18,931
- Time zone: UTC+2 (EET)
  - Summer (DST): UTC+3 (EEST)

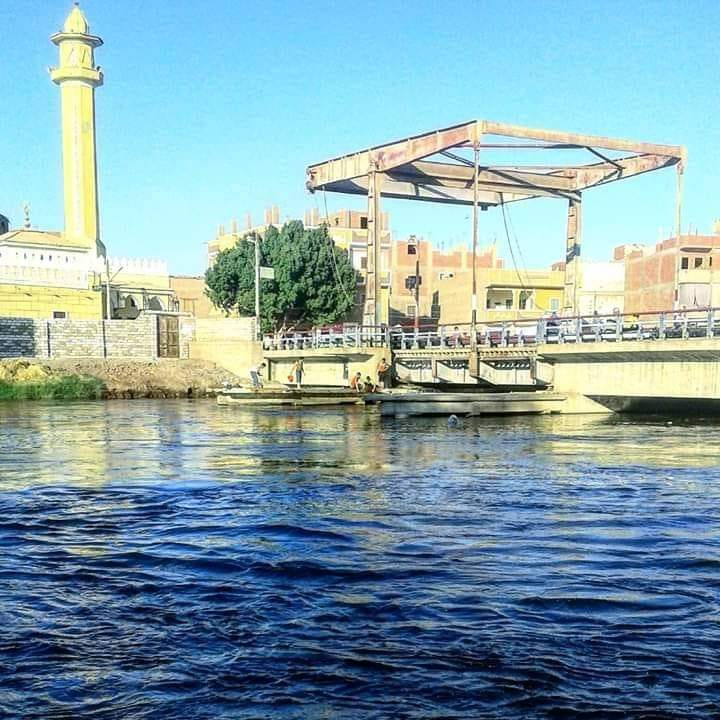
A photo of Qasr Hur village from the water

Qasr Hur (Egyptian Arabic: قصر هور) is a village in the Minya governorate of Egypt, around 300 km south of Cairo, on the edge of the Western Desert. The village is predominantly Muslim with a small Christian minority. The Coptic Orthodox Monastery of Saint Fana (also known as the Monastery of Abu Fanah) is adjacent to the village.

In 2006, the population of the village was 18,931, consisting of 9,253 (48.9%) females and 9,678 (51.1%) males.
