= Mallawi =

Mallawi ملوي ⲙⲁⲛⲗⲁⲩ
- City
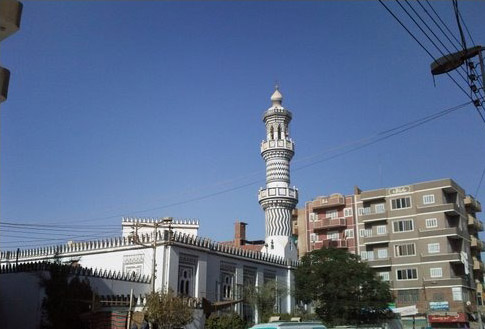

- Location in Egypt
- Coordinates: 27°43′55″N 30°50′28″E
- Country: Egypt
- Governorate: Minya

Area
  - Total: 19.28 km^{2} (7.44 sq mi)
- Elevation: 52 m (171 ft)

Population (2021)
  - Total: 212,628
  - Density: 11,030/km^{2} (28,560/sq mi)
- Time zone: UTC+2 (EET)
  - Summer (DST): UTC+3 (EEST)
- Area code: (+20) 86

Mallawi (Arabic: ملوي [mæl.ˈlæ.wi]; Saidi pronunciation: [ˈmal.la.wi], Coptic: ⲙⲁⲛⲗⲁⲩ) is a city in Egypt, located in the governorate of Minya.

== Name ==
The name of the city is derived from Coptic and literally means "the place of textile" (ⲙⲁⲛ – "place of", ⲗⲁⲩ – "textile").

== Geography ==
The total area of the city is about 3 acres (12,000 m^{2}). The southern limit is Allah Mansion (possibly a religious structure?), the northern limit is a television transmitter, the eastern border is the Nile, and the western boundary is Dirotiah Lake. The city contains many ancient Egyptian artifacts.

The Mallawi Museum is located in the city and features artifacts excavated in the vicinity.

=== Climate ===
Köppen-Geiger climate classification system classifies its climate as hot desert (BWh), as is the case with the rest of Egypt.

Climate data for Mallawi
Month	Jan	Feb	Mar	Apr	May	Jun	Jul	Aug	Sep	Oct	Nov	Dec	Year
Mean daily maximum °C (°F)	20.4 (68.7)	22.3 (72.1)	25.7 (78.3)	30.5 (86.9)	34.6 (94.3)	36.7 (98.1)	37.3 (99.1)	37 (99)	35.5 (95.9)	31 (88)	26 (79)	21 (70)	29.8 (85.8)
Mean daily minimum °C (°F)	5.8 (42.4)	7 (45)	9.8 (49.6)	13.8 (56.8)	18.1 (64.6)	21.2 (70.2)	22.5 (72.5)	22.7 (72.9)	21.1 (70.0)	17.6 (63.7)	11.9 (53.4)	7.5 (45.5)	14.9 (58.9)
Average precipitation mm (inches)	0 (0)	0 (0)	0 (0)	0 (0)	0 (0)	0 (0)	0 (0)	0 (0)	0 (0)	0 (0)	0 (0)	0 (0)	0 (0)
Source: Storm247

== Economy ==
Situated in a farm area, the city produces textiles and handicrafts.

== See also ==
- List of cities and towns in Egypt
- Mallawi Museum
- Monastery of Saint Fana
