= Architecture of Egypt =

Overview of the architectural history of Egypt

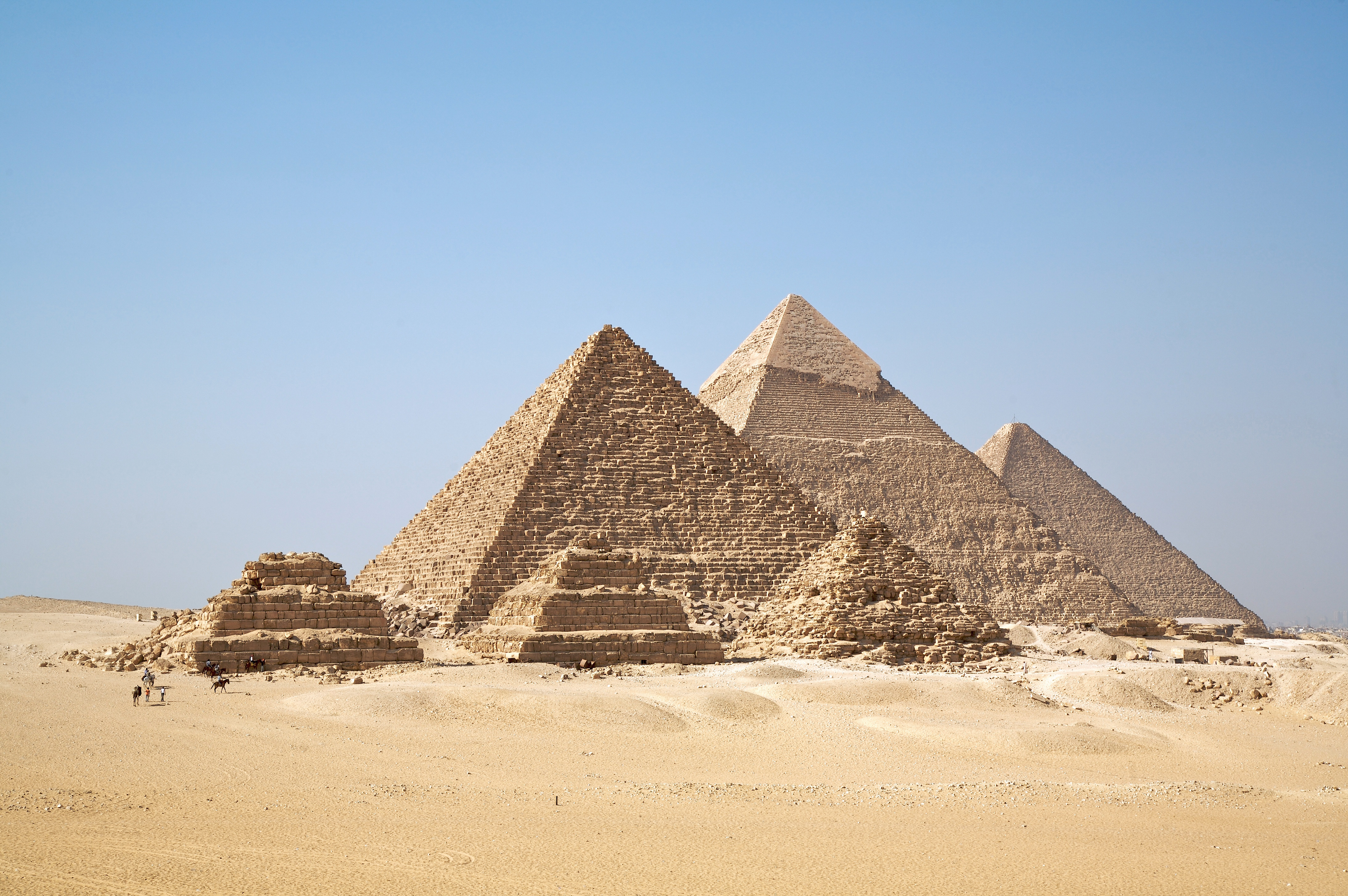
The Giza Pyramid complex (built sometime between 2600 and 2500 BC)

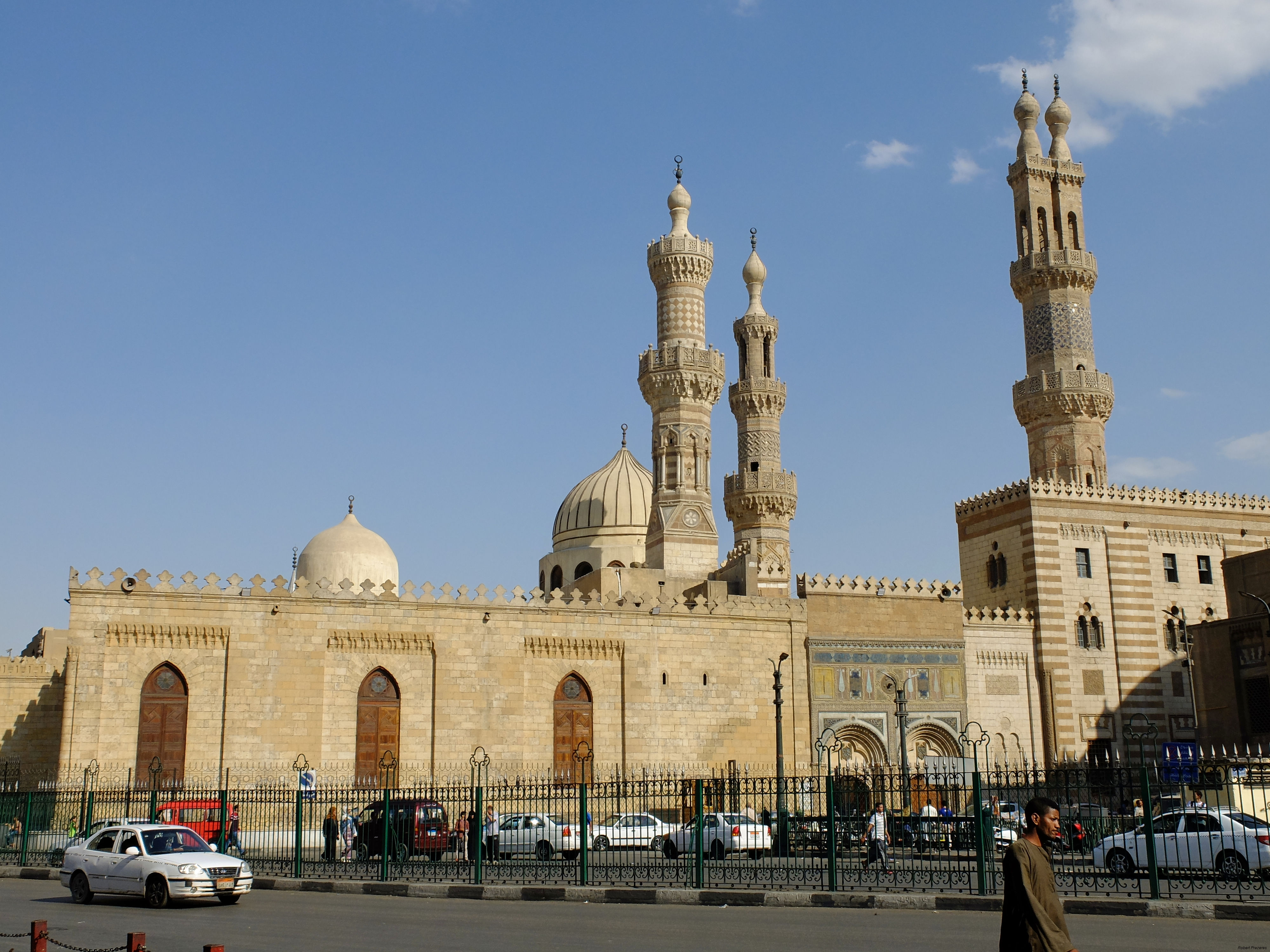
Al-Azhar Mosque in Cairo, a mix of Islamic architectural styles from the 10th to 19th centuries

Late 19th or early 20th century cityscape in downtown Alexandria

There have been many architectural styles used in Egyptian buildings over the centuries, including Ancient Egyptian architecture, Greco-Roman architecture, Islamic architecture, and modern architecture.

Ancient Egyptian architecture is best known for its monumental temples and tombs built in stone, including its famous pyramids, such as the pyramids of Giza. These were built with a distinctive repertoire of elements including pylon gateways, hypostyle halls, obelisks, and hieroglyphic decoration. The advent of Greek Ptolemaic rule, followed by Roman rule, introduced elements of Greco-Roman architecture into Egypt, especially in the capital city of Alexandria. After this came Coptic architecture, including early Christian architecture, which continued to follow ancient classical and Byzantine influences.

Following the Muslim conquest of Egypt in the 7th century, Islamic architecture flourished. A new capital, Fustat, was founded; it became the center of monumental architectural patronage thenceforth, and through successive new administrative capitals, it eventually became the modern city of Cairo. Early Islamic architecture displayed a mix of influences, including classical antiquity and new influences from the east such as the Abbasid style that radiated from the Abbasid Caliphate's heartland in Mesopotomia (present-day Iraq) during the 9th century. In the 10th century, Egypt became the center of a new empire, the Fatimid Caliphate. Fatimid architecture initiated further developments that influenced the architectural styles of subsequent periods. Saladin, who overthrew the Fatimids and founded the Ayyubid dynasty in the 12th century, was responsible for constructing the Cairo Citadel, which remained the center of government until the 19th century. During the Mamluk period (13th–16th centuries), a wealth of monumental religious and funerary complexes were built, constituting much of Cairo's medieval heritage today. The Mamluk architectural style continued to linger even after the Ottoman conquest of 1517, when Egypt became an Ottoman province.

In the early 19th century, Muhammad Ali began to modernize Egyptian society and encouraged a break with traditional medieval architectural traditions, initially by emulating late Ottoman architectural trends. Under the reign of his grandson Isma'il Pasha (1860s and 1870s), reform efforts were pushed further, the Suez Canal was constructed (inaugurated in 1869), and a new Haussmann-influenced expansion of Cairo began. European tastes became strongly evident in architecture in the late 19th century, though there was also a trend of reviving what were seen as indigenous or "national" architectural styles, such as the many Neo-Mamluk buildings of this era. In the 20th century, some Egyptian architects pushed back against dominant Western ideas of architecture. Among them, Hassan Fathy was known for adapting indigenous vernacular architecture to modern needs. Since then, Egypt continues to see new buildings erected in a variety of styles and for various purposes, ranging from housing projects to more monumental prestige projects like the Cairo Tower (1961) and the Bibliotheca Alexandrina (2002).

== Ancient ==
=== Ancient Egyptian period ===
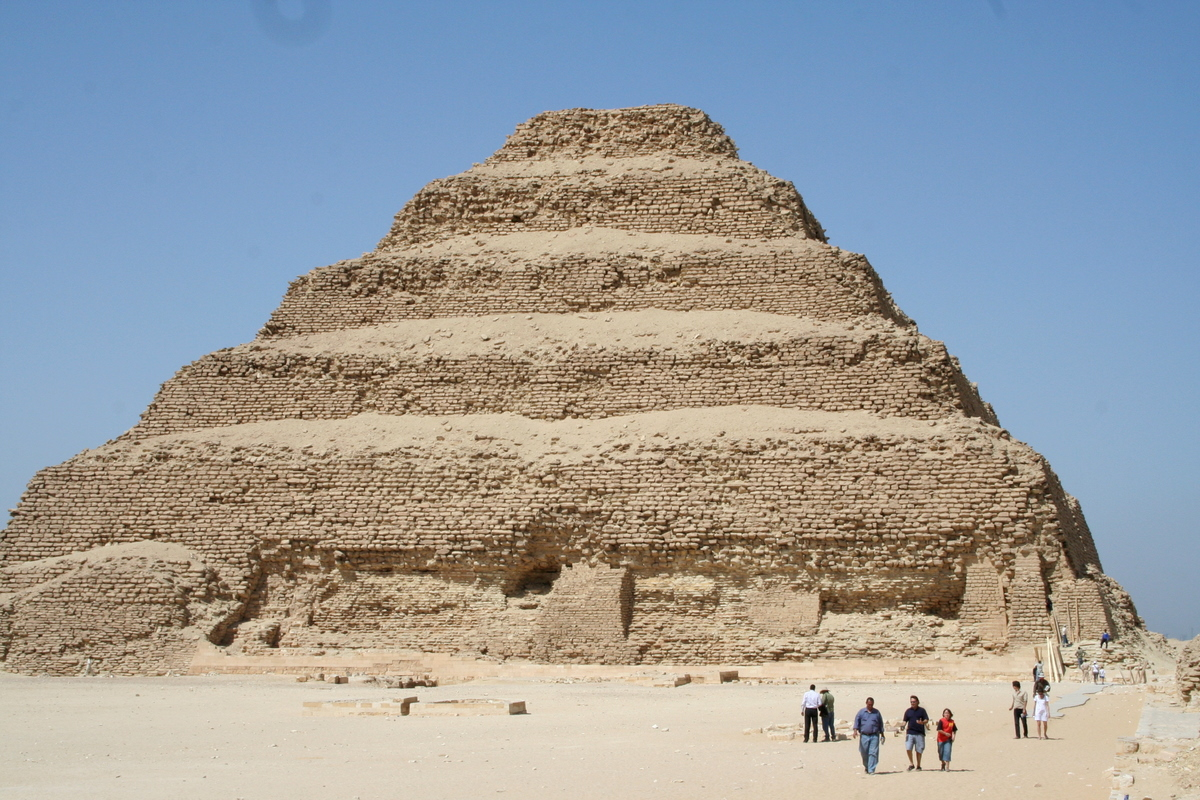
Pyramid of Djoser at Saqqara (c. 2650 BC), Old Kingdom period

Ancient Egypt's architecture included pyramids, temples, enclosed cities, canals, and dams. Most buildings were built of locally available materials by paid laborers and craftsmen. Monumental temples and tombs, built in stone and typically on terrain beyond the reach of the annual Nile floods, are the main structures to have survived to the present day. The most common type of stone used throughout the country was limestone, with sandstone also commonly used and quarried further south. Where harder stone was needed, granite was widely employed, with basalt also used for pavements.

Monumental complexes were usually fronted by massive pylons, approached via processional avenues (also known as a dromos) flanked by sphinx statues, and contained courtyards and hypostyle halls. Columns were typically adorned with capitals decorated to resemble plants important to Egyptian civilization, such as the papyrus plant, the lotus, or palm. Obelisks were another characteristic feature. Walls were decorated with scenes and hieroglyphic texts either painted or incised in relief.

Mortuary Temple of Queen Hatshepsut (c. 1473–1458 BC) in Thebes (modern Luxor), New Kingdom period

The first great era of construction took place during the Old Kingdom (c. 2700 – c. 2200 BC), which is also when the most impressive pyramid tombs were built. The oldest monumental stone structure of Egypt is the Stepped Pyramid of Djoser at Saqqara (c. 2650 BC), while the Great Pyramids of Giza and the Great Sphinx were all built roughly from 2600 to 2500 BC.

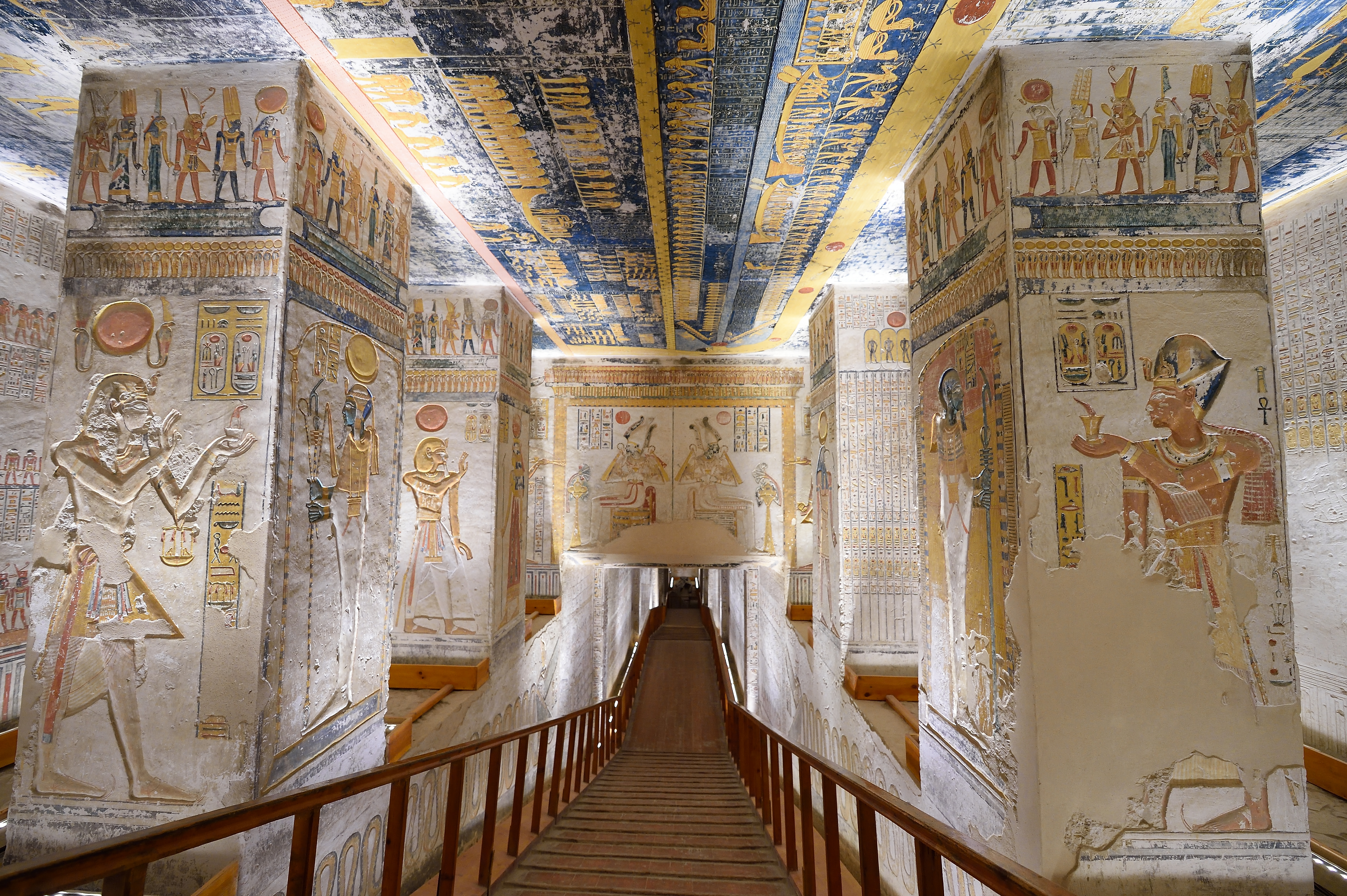
Decorated chamber in the Tomb of Ramses V and Ramses VI (c. 1145 BC) in the Valley of Kings, New Kingdom period

The construction of great buildings was revived during the New Kingdom (c. 1570 – c. 1085 BC), when Thebes served as the main capital. The most impressive monuments from this period include the great temple complex of Karnak, the Mortuary Temple of Queen Hatshepsut, the Luxor Temple, the Temple of Abu Simbel, the Ramesseum (funerary temple of Ramses II) and the Mortuary Temple of Ramses III at Medinet Habu. Starting with the Eighteenth Dynasty, the pharaohs were buried in underground tombs, richly decorated but hidden from sight, in the Valley of the Kings.

Domestic architecture was typically built with mudbrick, wood, and reed mats, and the main towns were situated on the agriculturally rich floodplains of the Nile. As a result, little of this everyday architecture has survived. Some idea of their form is known thanks to three-dimensional models that were left in tombs, which suggest that they resembled vernacular building types still found in the Nile valley and other parts of Africa today.

=== Greco-Roman period ===
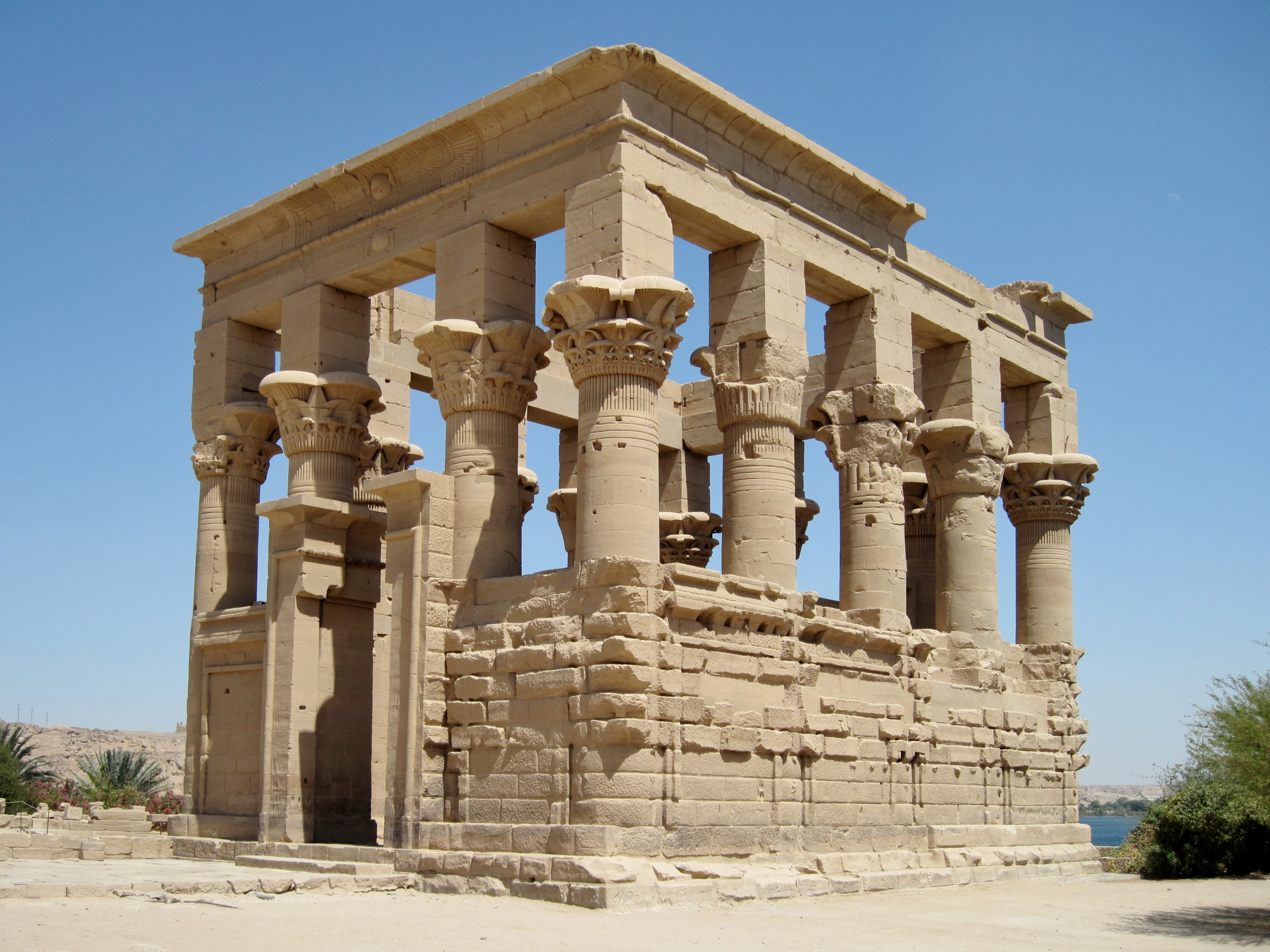
Trajan's Kiosk at Philae (c. 100 AD), Roman period

During the Greco-Roman period of Egypt (332 BC–395 AD), when Egypt was ruled by the Greek Ptolemaic dynasty and then the Roman Empire, Egyptian architecture underwent significant changes due to the influence of Greek architecture.

The capital city of Alexandria was an innovator in architecture and its influence was felt in places such as Pompeii and Constantinople. Its plan was largely that of a Greek city, with local elements mixed in. Most of the city has disappeared under the water or under the modern city today, but it was known from descriptions to contain many great buildings including a royal palace, the Musaeum, the Library of Alexandria, and the famous Pharos Lighthouse.

Many well-preserved temples in Upper Egypt date from this era, such as the Temple of Edfu, the Temple of Kom Ombo, and the Philae temple complex. While temple architecture remained more traditionally Egyptian, new Greco-Roman influences are evident, such as the appearance of Composite capitals. Egyptian motifs also made their way into wider Greek and Roman architecture.

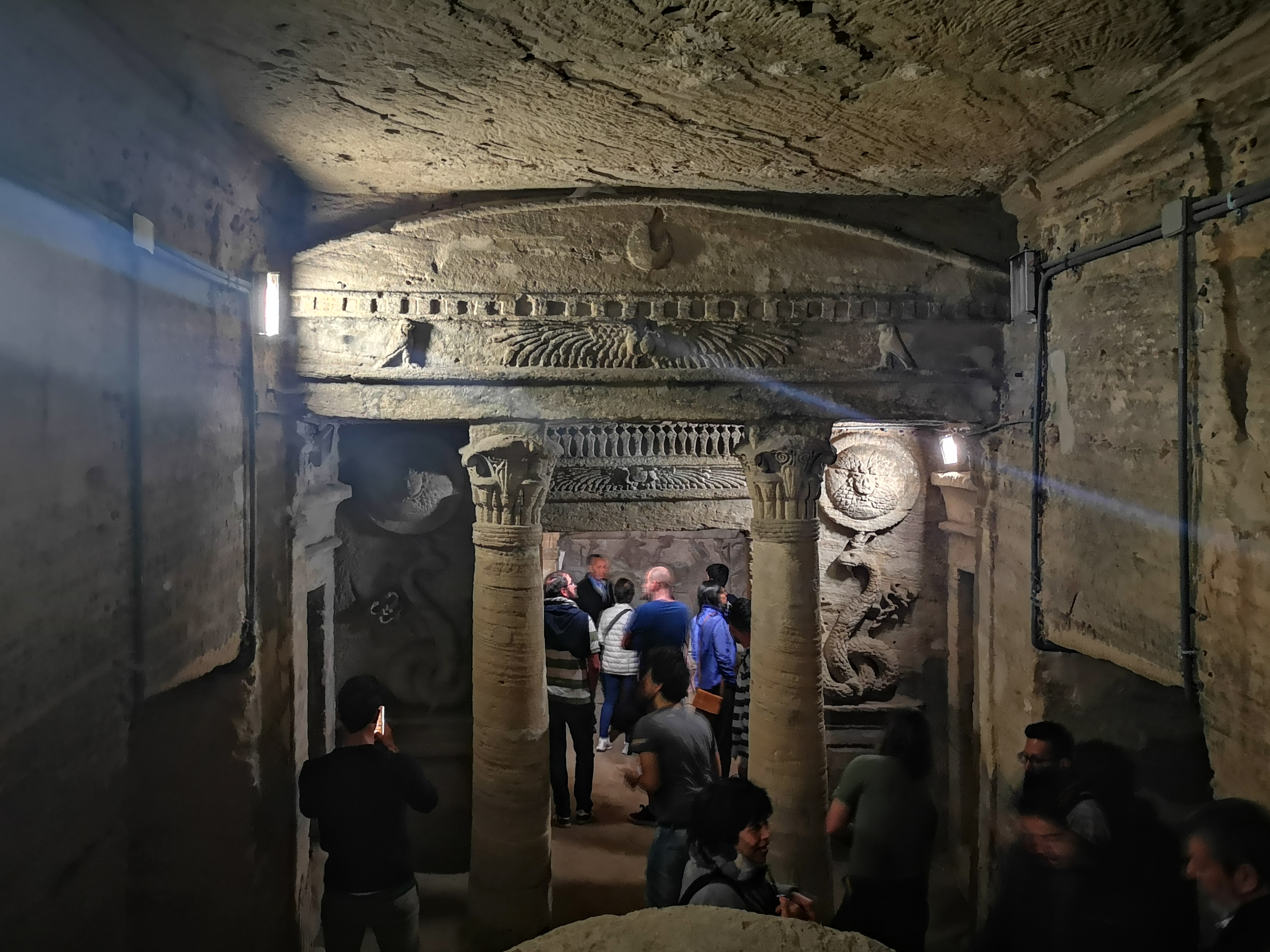
Catacombs of Kom El Shoqafa in Alexandria (1st to 3rd centuries AD), Roman period

Much of the period's funerary architecture has not survived, though some of Alexandria's underground catacombs, shared by the city's inhabitants to bury their dead, have been preserved. They feature a hybrid architectural style in which both classical and Egyptian decoration are mixed together. The Catacombs of Kom El Shoqafa, begun in the 1st century AD and continuously enlarged until the 3rd century, are one notable example and can be visited today.

=== Late Antiquity and Byzantine period ===
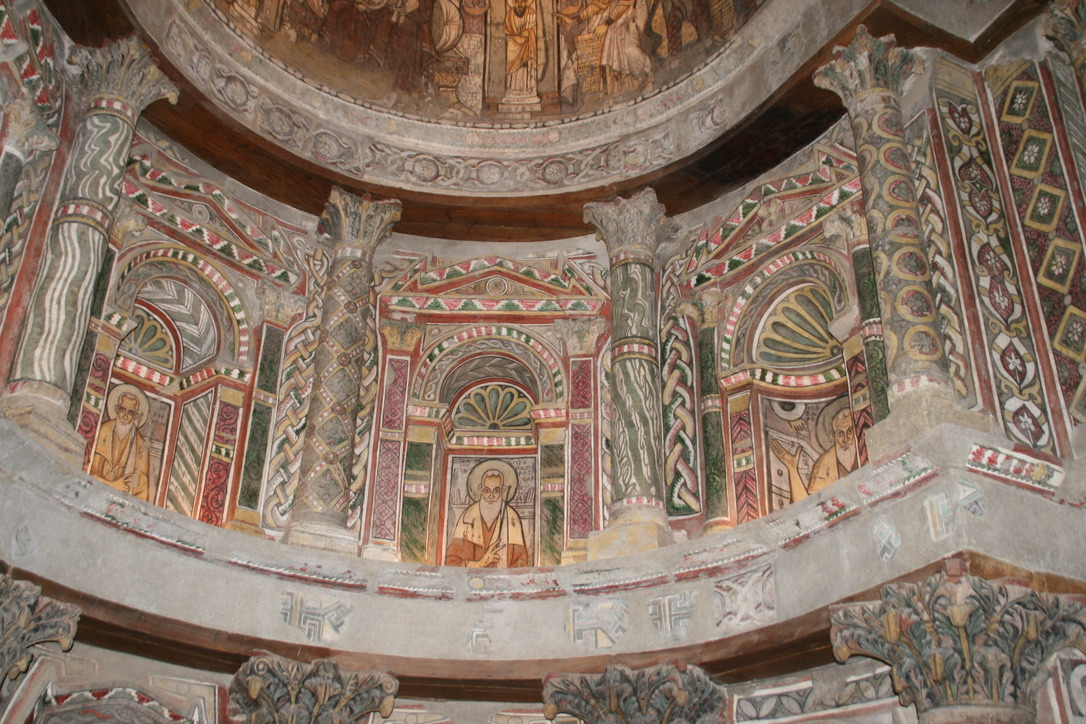
Coptic decoration in the apses of the Red Monastery at Sohag (5th to 13th centuries)

Coptic architecture, which dates from the Late Antique or Byzantine period, is continuous with classical traditions. Egypt was also the site of the earliest Christian monasteries, which became numerous by the end of the 4th century AD. Almost no traces of Alexandria's ancient churches have been found, but some exceptional examples of Early Christian architecture have been preserved in the Nile Valley, such as the Red Monastery (founded in the 4th century) and the White Monastery (c. 440) near Sohag. The continuity between earlier classical and later Coptic architecture can also be seen in the remains of major urban centres such as Hermopolis Magna, where the same craftsmanship appears in both pagan and Christian buildings from the 3rd or 4th centuries. At the Kharga Oasis in the Western Desert, the El Bagawat necropolis contains tombs and small chapels from both the pre-Christian and early Christian periods, ranging roughly from the late 3rd to 8th centuries. The Chapel of the Exodus is one of the oldest at this site, built around the early 4th century, while a nearby church, possibly dating to the 5th century, may be one of the oldest remains of a church in Egypt.

Remains of churches from the 4th and early 5th centuries show that they were built as basilicas with a tripartite sanctuary including a transverse aisle and a straight eastern wall. The Red Monastery and White Monastery at Sohag, representative of the 5th century, have rectangular basilical layouts culminating in a more sophisticated triconch sanctuary, surrounded by three semi-circular apses with decorative niches. By the 7th century, the typical plan of a Coptic church consisted of a basilica with a barrel-vaulted nave, pillars and aisles along the sides and a transept flanked by three square apses covered by domes or semi-domes. Coptic churches continued to be built during the following Islamic period, usually retaining a basilical plan.

Early Coptic buildings also demonstrate a continuing tradition of rich decoration, including Corinthian and Byzantine "basket" capitals and wall paintings. Extensive remains of painted decoration, some of it in early Byzantine style, can be found in the chapels of the Bagawat Necropolis – particularly in the Chapel of Peace from the 5th to 6th centuries and, in less sophisticated form, in the 4th-century Chapel of the Exodus – and in the triconch of the Red Monastery – painted in various phases from the 5th to 13th centuries. Many other examples of painted and sculptural decoration from ancient churches are preserved today at the Coptic Museum in Cairo.

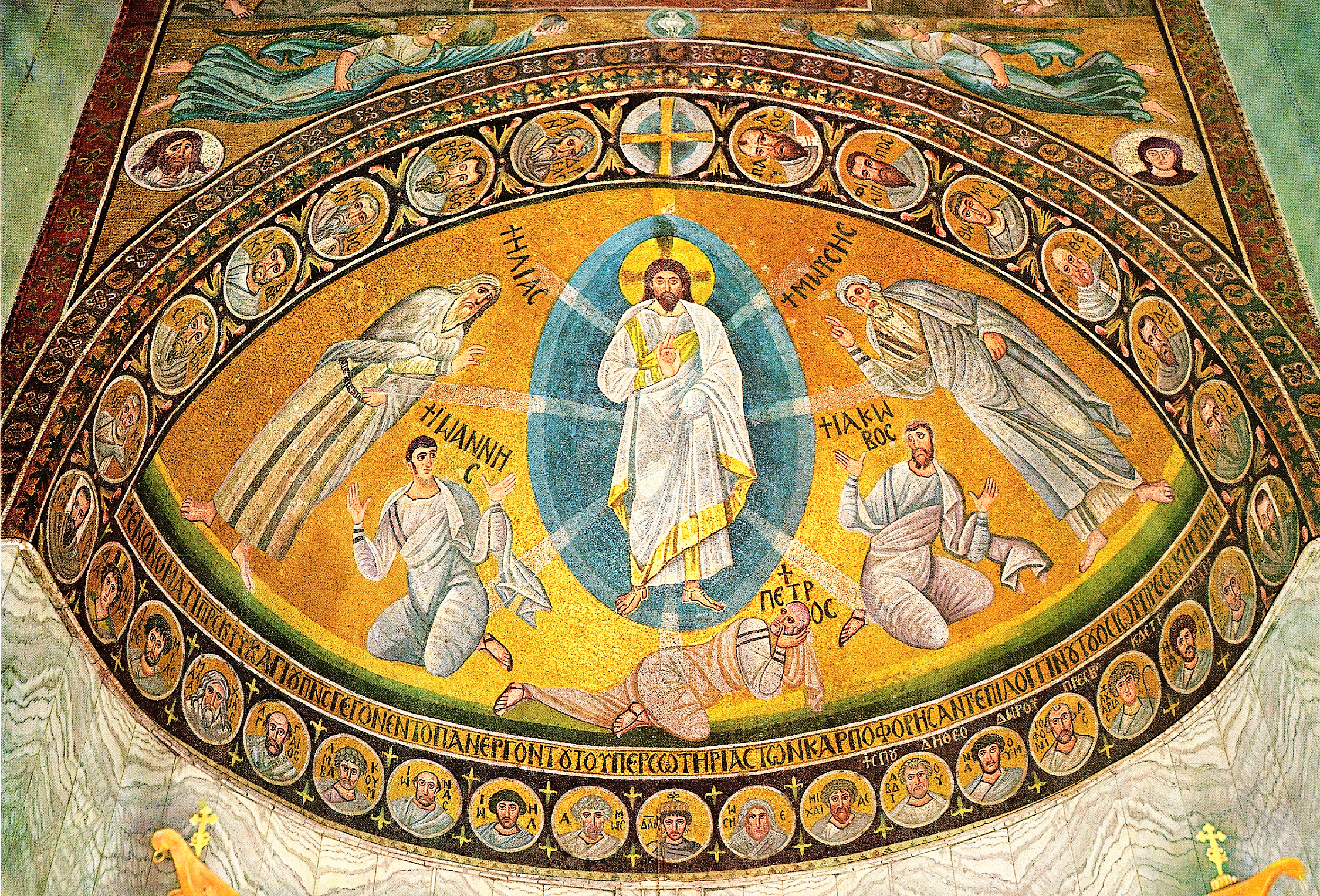
6th-century mosaic of the Transfiguration in Saint Catherine's Monastery in the Sinai Peninsula

At Mount Sinai, the Monastery of Saint Catherine (originally dedicated to and named after the Burning Bush) was built by emperor Justinian (r. 527–565). Today it is the oldest continuously inhabited Christian monastery in the world. Although much rebuilt and restored, the site still retains substantial remains from its sixth-century construction, including a three-aisled basilical church with a Byzantine mosaic of the Transfiguration.

== Medieval ==
After the Muslim conquest of Egypt in 640, the region was initially integrated into the Rashidun Caliphate, followed by the Umayyad Caliphate and Abbasid Caliphate. It was then ruled by a succession of autonomous local dynasties and later became the center of several Muslim empires. Early Islamic architecture in Egypt continued to be influenced by Late Antique traditions and soon afterwards by Abbasid architecture in contemporary Iraq (Mesopotamia). Some Islamic-era buildings also reused materials from Pharaonic and Byzantine eras, and in some later cases from Crusader buildings in the Levant. The greatest architectural patronage of the Islamic period was centered in Cairo, which preserves one of the richest concentrations of medieval monuments in the Muslim world today.

=== Early Islamic period ===
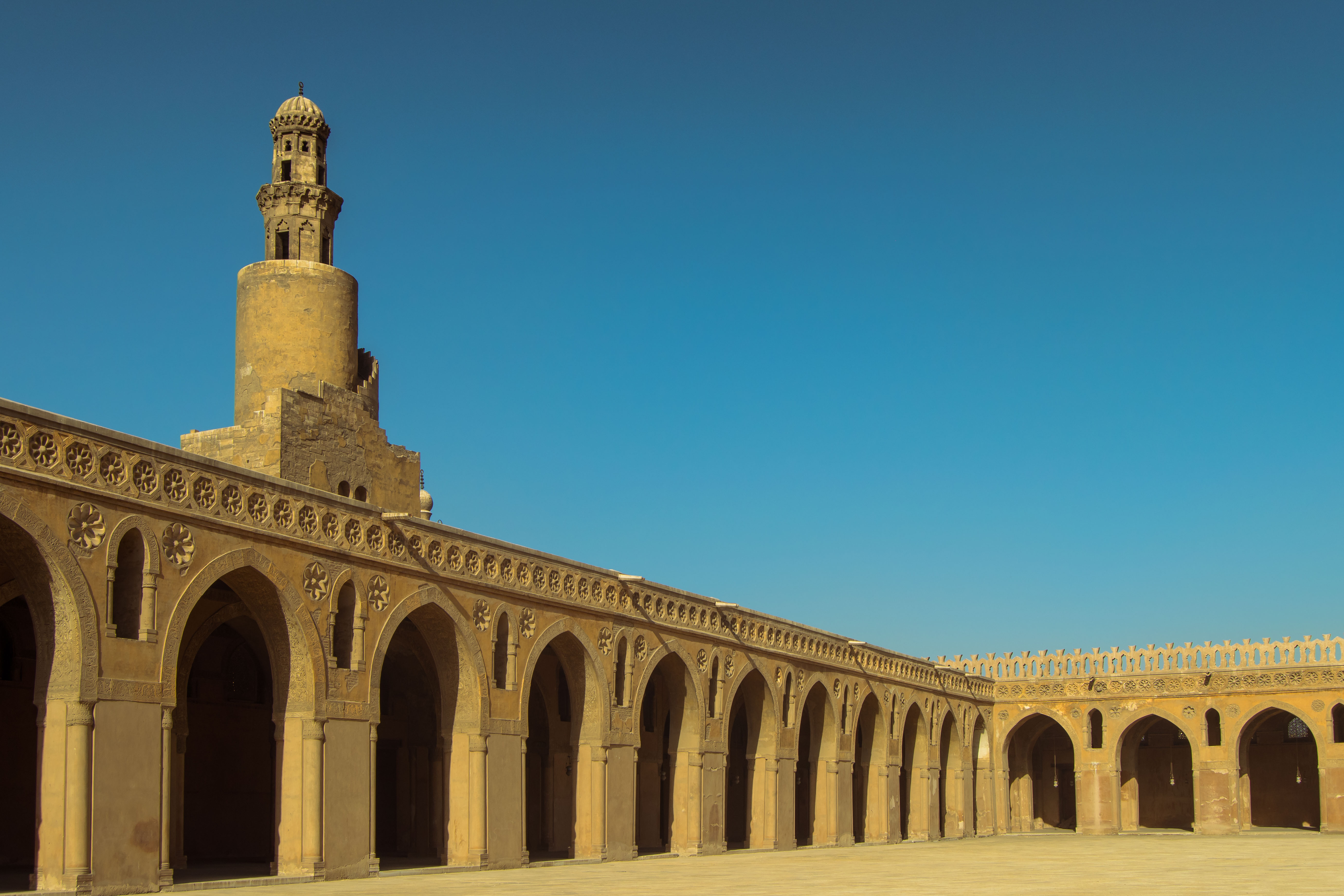
Ibn Tulun Mosque in Cairo (c. 879), Abbasid (Tulunid) period

After the conquest of 640, the Arab conquerors established a new city called Fustat, near the former Byzantine-Roman fort of Babylon, to serve as the administrative capital and military garrison center of Muslim Egypt. Later foundations near this initial urban center eventually transformed it into the modern city of Cairo. The foundation of Fustat was also accompanied by the foundation of Egypt's (and Africa's) first mosque, the Mosque of 'Amr ibn al-'As; though rebuilt many times over the centuries, it still exists today. Its interior consists of a large hypostyle hall with an internal rectangular courtyard. The oldest well-preserved monument of the Islamic period in Egypt is the Nilometer on the island of Rawda in Cairo, built in 861.

After reaching its apogee, the Abbasid Caliphate, which ruled most of the Muslim world, became fragmented into regional states in the 9th century which were formally obedient to the caliphs but de facto independent. In Egypt, Ahmad ibn Tulun established a short-lived dynasty, the Tulunids, and built himself a new capital, Al-Qata'i, near Fustat. Its principal surviving monument is a large congregational mosque, known as the Ibn Tulun Mosque, which was completed in 879. It was strongly influenced by Abbasid architecture in Samarra and remains one of the most notable and best-preserved examples of 9th-century architecture from the Abbasid Caliphate. The structure consists of a large open courtyard surrounded on four sides by roofed aisles divided by rows of pointed arches supported by large rectangular pillars. The arches and windows are decorated with carved stucco featuring geometric and Samarran-style vegetal motifs.

=== Fatimid period ===
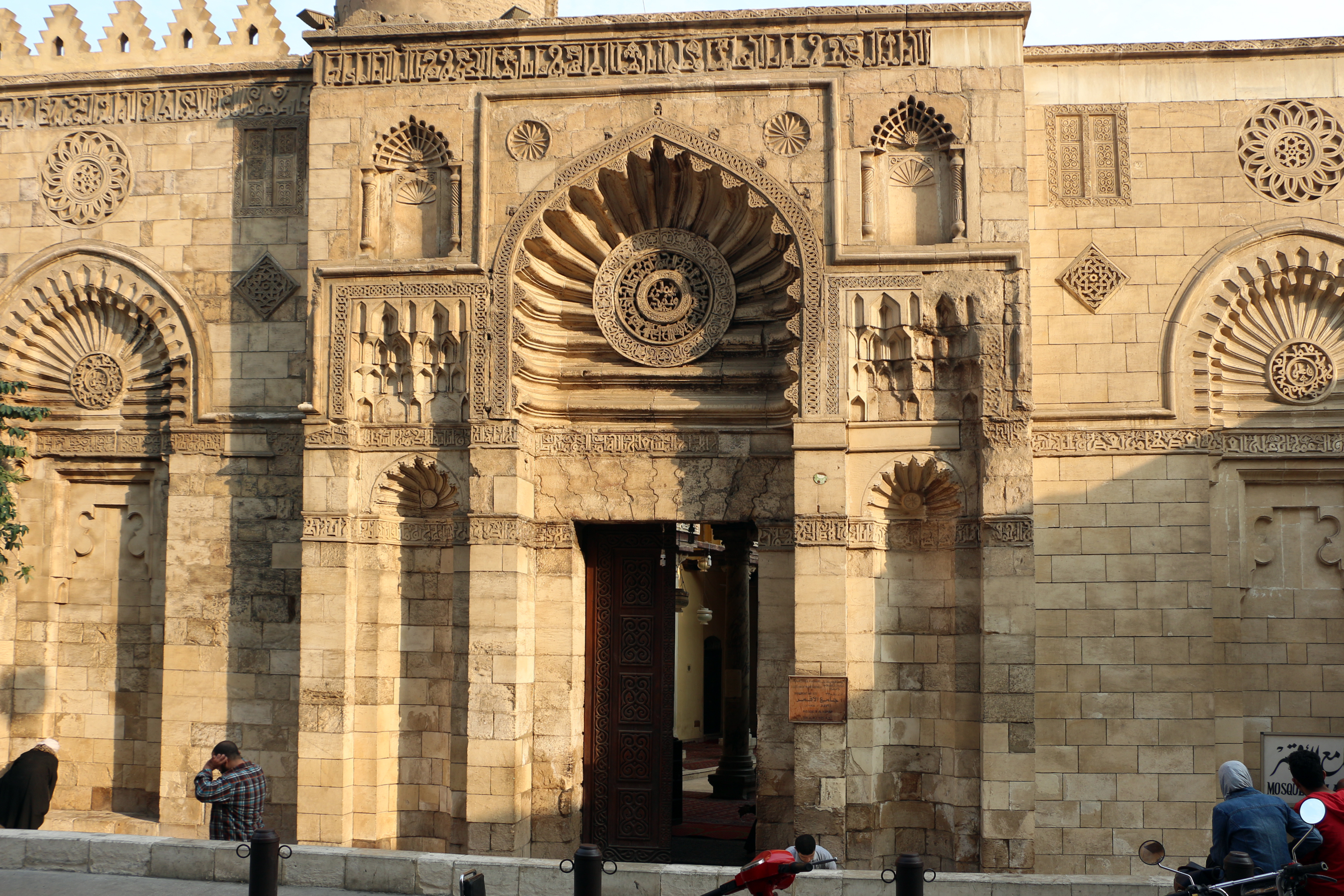
Decorated façade of the Aqmar Mosque (1125) in Cairo, Fatimid period

In the early 10th century, the Fatimid Caliphate rose to power in Ifriqiya (central North Africa), establishing itself as a rival to Abbasid influence. After conquering Egypt in 969, the Fatimids moved their center of power to Egypt in 970 by founding another capital, Cairo, a short distance north of Fustat. Fatimid architecture in Egypt followed Tulunid techniques and used similar materials, but also developed some of its own. Their first congregational mosque in Cairo was al-Azhar Mosque, founded in the same year as the city itself. This mosque became the spiritual center for the Ismaili Shi'a branch of Islam, which the Fatimids followed. Like other congregational mosques of the era, it consists of an open-air courtyard and a covered hypostyle prayer hall. Other notable Fatimid monuments include the large Mosque of al-Hakim (built 990 to 1013), the small Aqmar Mosque (1125) with its richly decorated street façade, and the domed Mashhad of Sayyida Ruqayya (1133), notable for its mihrab of elaborately carved stucco. Under the powerful vizier Badr al-Jamali (r. 1073–1094), the city walls were rebuilt in stone along with several monumental gates, three of which have survived to the present-day: Bab al-Futuh, Bab al-Nasr, and Bab Zuweila).

The Fatimids made wide usage of the "keel" arch and also introduced muqarnas (stalactite-like niches) in the shapes of squinches (a technique for transitioning from a square space below to a circular dome above). Floral, arabesque, and geometric motifs were the main motifs of surface decoration, carved in stucco, wood, and sometimes stone. Keel arch-shaped niches, with a centrally-radiating fluted motif, also appear and became a characteristic of later architectural decoration in Cairo. Figural representations, generally taboo in Islamic religious architecture, were used in the architectural decoration of Fatimid palaces.

=== Ayyubid period ===
Saladin dethroned the Fatimid caliphs in 1171 and inaugurated the Ayyubid dynasty, which retained Cairo as its capital. Military architecture was the supreme expression of the Ayyubid period. The most radical change Saladin implemented in Egypt was enclosing Cairo and Fustat within a single city wall. Some fortification techniques were learned from the Crusaders, such as curtain walls following the natural topography. Many were also inherited from the Fatimids, like machicolations and round towers; other techniques were developed by the Ayyubids themselves, such as concentric planning.

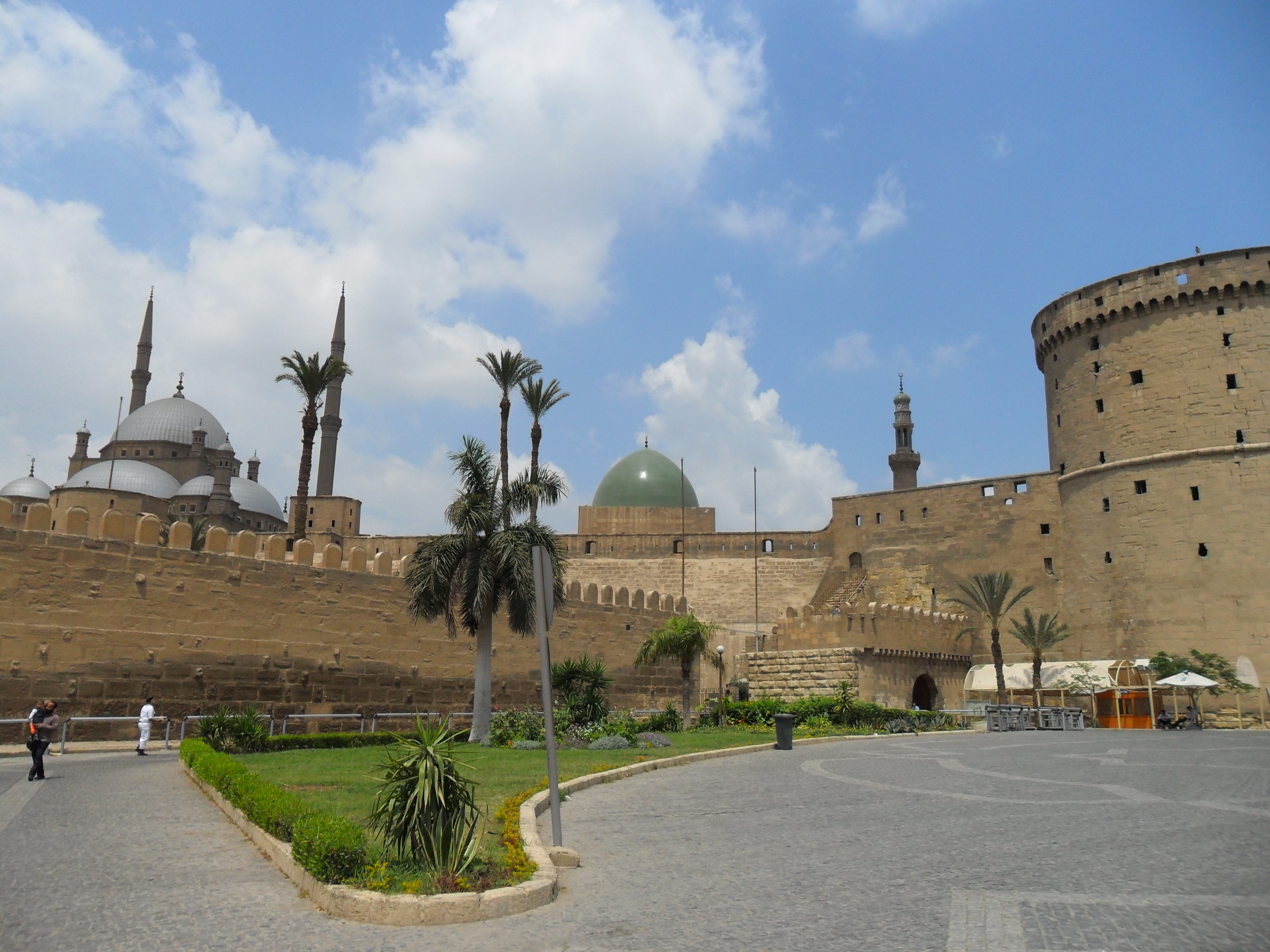
Citadel of Cairo, begun in 1176 by Saladin, expanded and modified several times in later centuries

In 1176, the construction of the Cairo Citadel began under Saladin's orders. It was to become the center of government in Egypt until the 19th century, with expansions and renovations. The Citadel was completed under sultan Al-Kamil (r. 1218–1238). All of al-Kamil's fortifications can be identified by their embossed, rusticated masonry, whereas Saladin's towers have smooth dressed stones. This heavier rustic style became a common feature in other Ayyubid fortifications. After the domination of the Shi'a Fatimids, the Ayyubid rulers were also eager to promote the restoration of Sunni Islam by building Sunni madrasas. The first Sunni madrasa in Egypt was commissioned by Saladin near the important Mausoleum of Imam al-Shafi'i in Cairo's Southern Cemetery.

The end of the Ayyubid period and the start of the Mamluk period was marked by the creation of the first multi-purpose funerary complexes in Cairo. The last Ayyubid sultan, al-Salih Ayyub, founded the Madrasa al-Salihiyya in 1242. His wife, Shajar ad-Durr, added his mausoleum to it after his death in 1249, and then built her own mausoleum and madrasa complex in 1250 at another location south of the Citadel. These two complexes were the first in Cairo to combine a founder's mausoleum with a religious and charitable complex, which would come to characterize the nature of most Mamluk royal foundations afterward.

=== Mamluk period ===
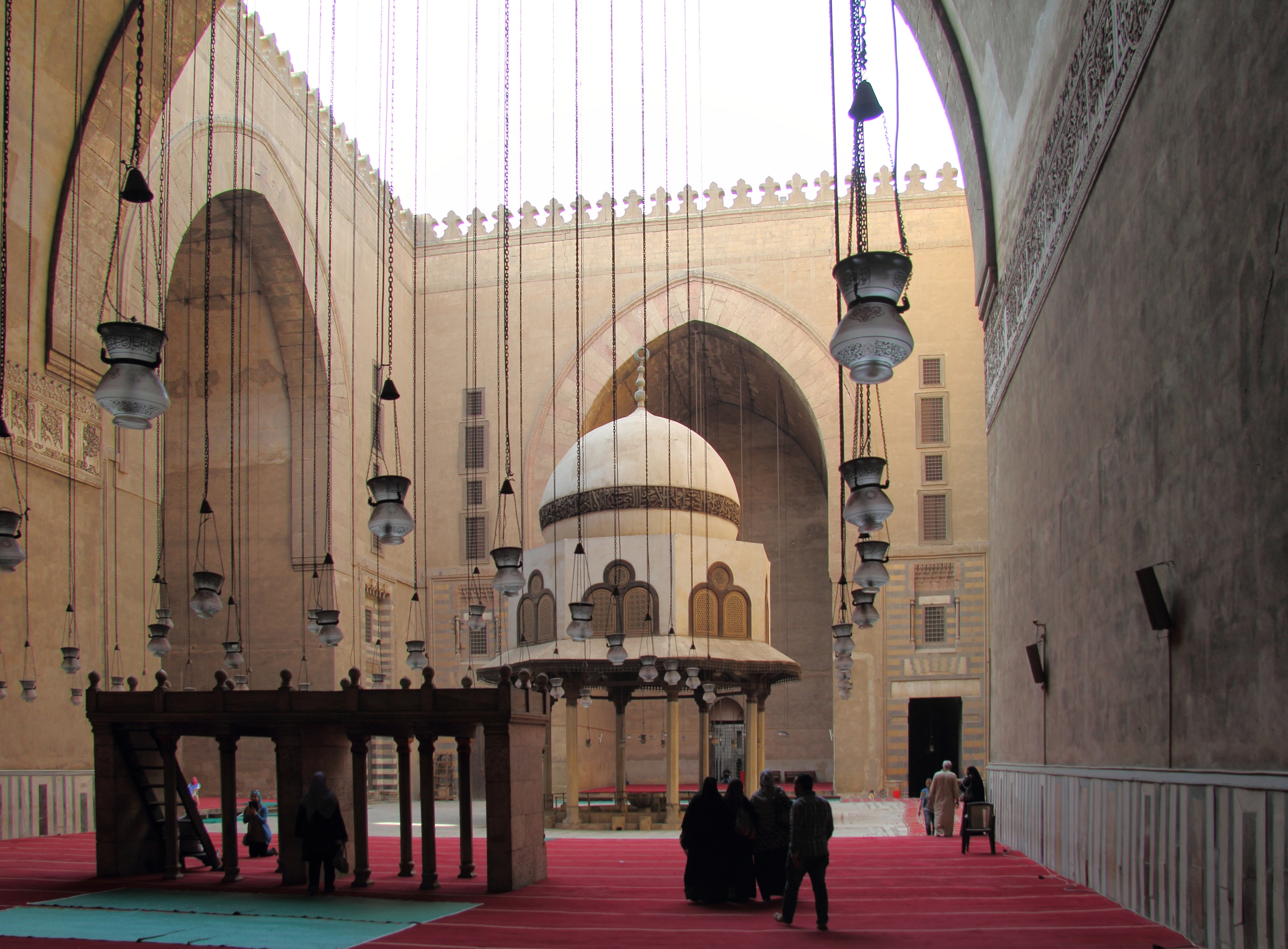
Madrasa-Mosque of Sultan Hasan in Cairo (1356–1363), Mamluk period, with a four-iwan interior layout

The Mamluks, a military corps under the Ayyubid dynasty recruited from slaves, took power in 1250, ruling over Egypt and much of the Middle East until the Ottoman conquest of 1517. Despite their often violent internal politics, the Mamluk sultans were generous patrons of architecture and are responsible for much of the monumental heritage of historic Cairo. Some long-reigning sultans, such as Al-Nasir Muhammad (r. 1293–1341, with interruptions) and Qaytbay (r. 1468–1496), were especially prolific. Under Mamluk rule, Cairo reached its apogee of wealth and population in the 14th century (prior to its second rise in the modern period).

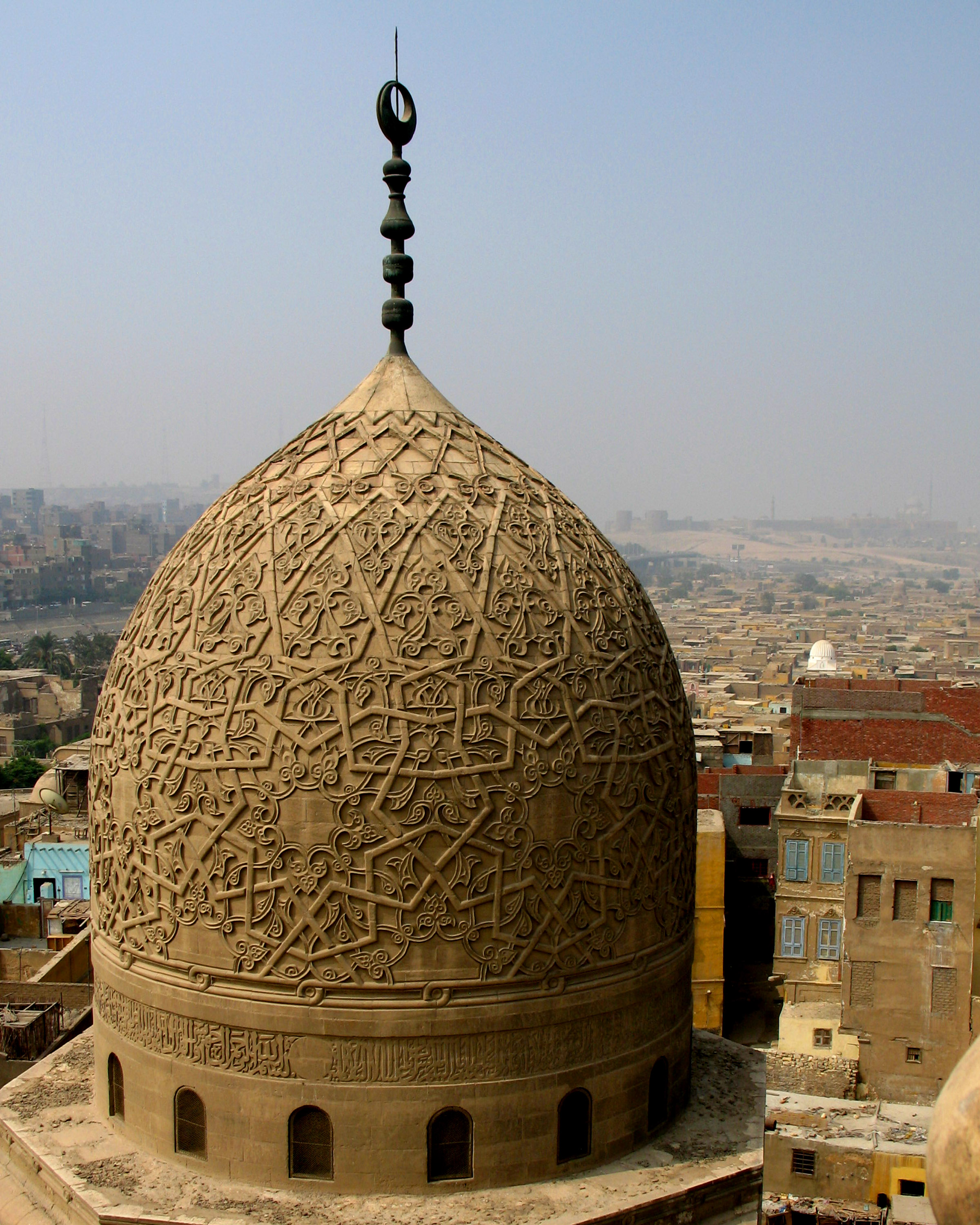
Carved stone dome of Sultan Qaytbay's mausoleum in Cairo (1470–1474), late Mamluk period

Mamluk architecture is distinguished in part by the construction of multi-functional buildings, whose floor plans became increasingly creative and complex due to the city's limited available space and the desire to make monuments visually dominant in their urban surroundings. Patrons, including sultans and high-ranking emirs, typically set out to build mausoleums for themselves, but attached to them various charitable structures such as madrasas, khanqahs, sabils, or mosques. The revenues and expenses of these charitable complexes were governed by inalienable waqf agreements that also served the secondary purpose of ensuring some form of income or property for the patrons' descendants.

The cruciform or four-iwan floor plan was adopted for madrasas and became more common for new monumental complexes than the traditional hypostyle mosque, although the vaulted iwans of the early period were replaced with flat-roofed iwans in the later period. The decoration of monuments also became more elaborate over time, with stone-carving and polychrome marble mosaic paneling (including ablaq stonework) replacing stucco as the most dominant architectural decoration. Monumental decorated entrance portals became common compared to earlier periods, often sculpted with muqarnas. Influences from Syria, Ilkhanid Iran, and possibly even Venice were evident in these trends. Minarets, which were also elaborate, usually consisted of three tiers separated by balconies, with each tier having a different design than the others. Late Mamluk minarets, for example, most typically had an octagonal shaft for the first tier, a round shaft on the second, and a lantern structure with finial on the third level. Domes evolved from wooden or brick structures, sometimes of bulbous shape, to pointed stone domes with complex geometric or arabesque motifs carved into their outer surfaces. The peak of this stone dome architecture was achieved under the reign of Qaytbay in the late 15th century.

== Ottoman and early modern period ==
=== Ottoman period ===
After the Ottoman conquest of 1517, new Ottoman-style buildings were introduced; however, the Mamluk style continued to be repeated or combined with Ottoman architectural elements in new buildings. The new Ottoman features included the "pencil"-style Ottoman minarets, mosques planned around a central dome, and colorful tile decoration. Compared to earlier periods, however, architectural patronage was smaller, as Egypt was no longer the center of an empire, but merely an Ottoman province. Some building types from the late Mamluk period, such as sabil-kuttabs (a combination of sabil and kuttab) and multi-storied caravanserais (wikalas or khans), actually grew in number during the Ottoman period.

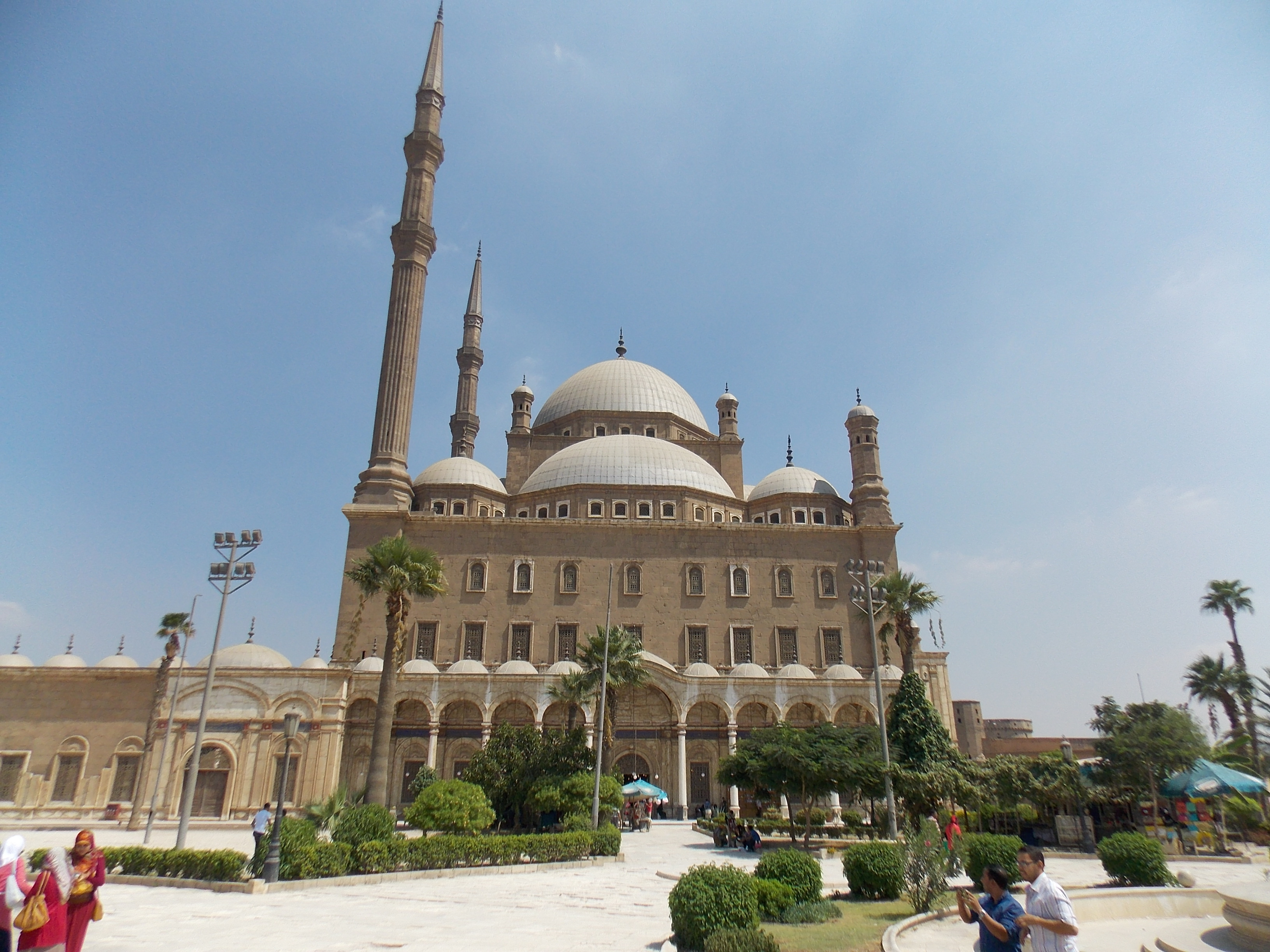
Muhammad Ali Mosque in the Cairo Citadel (1830–1857), in Ottoman style with European-influenced details

In the 19th century, under the de facto independent rule of Muhammad Ali and his successors, new buildings, such as the Mosque of Muhammad Ali in the Citadel (built 1830–1848), conspicuously employed Ottoman Baroque and contemporary late Ottoman Westernizing decoration. The more strictly Ottoman form of Muhammad Ali's mosque and its European-style decoration was a radical break from the traditional Mamluk-influenced architecture of Cairo and symbolized Muhammad Ali's efforts to bring Egypt into a new era. The new style of this period also appears in multiple sabil-kuttabs built throughout the city, which feature curved street facades carved with new leaf, garland, and sunburst motifs.

=== Khedivate period and European influence ===
Palace of Sa'id Halim Pasha in Cairo (1896–1900), inspired by French Baroque architecture; an example of European styles in turn-of-the-century Cairo

One of Muhammad Ali's grandsons, Isma'il, ruling officially as Khedive between 1863 and 1879, pushed even further for modernization. He oversaw the construction of the modern Suez Canal, which was inaugurated in 1869. Along with this enterprise, he also undertook the construction of a vast new district in European style to the north and west of the historic center of Cairo. The new city emulated Haussman's 19th-century reforms of Paris, with grand boulevards and squares forming part of the urban plan. Isma'il even employed architects recommended by Baron Haussman. Although never fully completed to the extent of Isma'il's vision, this new expansion composes much of what is downtown Cairo today. This left the old historic districts of Cairo, including the walled city, relatively neglected. Even the Citadel lost its status as the royal residence when Isma'il moved to the new Abdin Palace in 1874. The city of Ismailia, named after Isma'il, was founded in 1863 by French engineer Ferdinand de Lesseps as a base for workers on the Suez Canal project. It too was laid out with wide boulevards and squares.

These projects exemplified a trend of Francophilia that was present during this time in both Cairo and Istanbul (the Ottoman capital), as the elites of both places began to value French ideas and Parisian aesthetics. In the design of buildings, not only Paris but also Vienna were sources of inspiration. Austro-Hungarian interpretations of French and Italianate styles served as models for architecture during the reign of Khedive 'Abbas Hilmi (r. 1892–1914). The Beaux-Arts and Secession (Austrian Art Nouveau) styles of Vienna are widely evident in new buildings around the end of the 19th century and the beginning of the 20th century. Egypt's first architectural competition was held in 1894 for the design of the Egyptian Museum, housing the country's growing collection of antiquities. The winner, French architect Marcel Dourgnon, designed a large Neoclassical building completed in 1902.

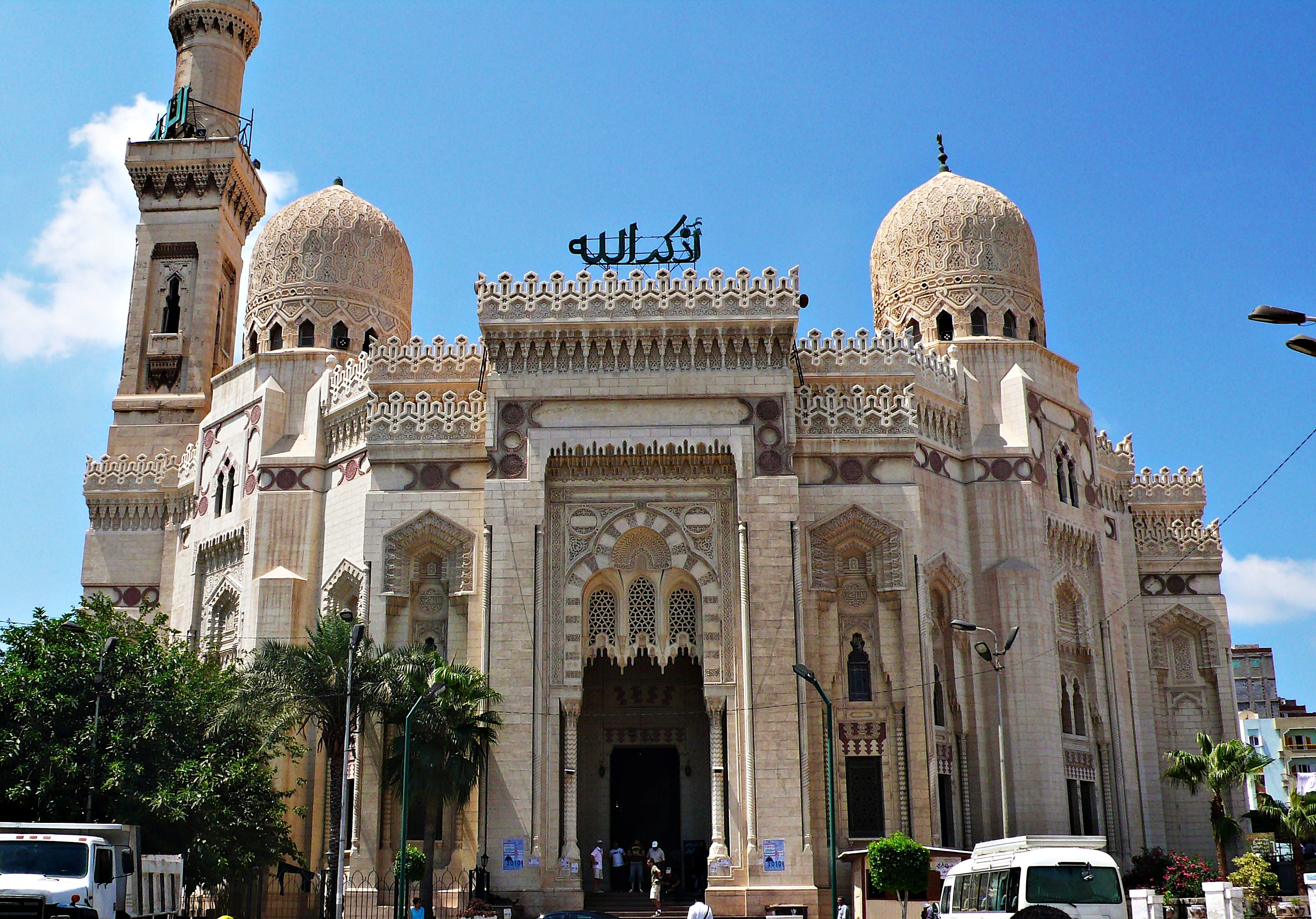
Abu al-Abbas al-Mursi Mosque in Alexandria (completed in 1945), in neo-Mamluk style

In the late 19th century and early 20th century a "Neo-Mamluk" style appeared, partly as a nationalist response against Ottoman and European styles, in an effort to promote local "Egyptian" styles (though the architects were sometimes Europeans). Examples of this style are the Mausoleum of Tawfiq Pasha (1894), the present Sayyida Nafisa Mosque (1895), the Sayyida Aisha Mosque (1894–1896), the Museum of Islamic Arts building (1903), the Al-Rifa'i Mosque (1869–1911), and the Abu al-Abbas al-Mursi Mosque in Alexandria (1929–1945).

Baron Empain Palace in Heliopolis (1911), a pastiche of Hindu temple architecture

New suburbs and towns around Cairo were created in the early 20th century and experimented with different styles. Heliopolis, the first Cairo suburb established on the desert fringes, holds one of the most important concentrations of significant early 20th century architecture outside of downtown Cairo. It was founded in 1906 by a private partnership between the Belgian Édouard Empain and the Egyptian Boghos Nubar Pasha and it grew over the following decades. Its buildings were designed in a wide range of styles, including Neo-Islamic or Neo-Mamluk, Art Deco, or eclectic combinations of Orientalist and Modernist styles. The Heliopolis Company buildings lining some of its main streets, completed towards 1908, are in a Neo-Islamic/Neo-Mamluk style designed by Ernest Jaspar, while Baron Empain's own palace, completed in 1911 by Alexandre Marcel, is a flamboyant imitation of Hindu temple architecture adapted to the layout of a Beaux-Arts building.

A "neo-Pharaonic" style also appeared in the early 20th century and was used by some architects. The Mausoleum of Saad Zaghloul (1928–1931), designed by Mustafa Fahmi (d. 1972), is one example. Though Egyptian Revival architecture was popular in Europe and North America during the 19th century, its popularity as a national style in Egypt itself was ultimately limited.

== Modernism and present day ==
=== 20th century modernism ===
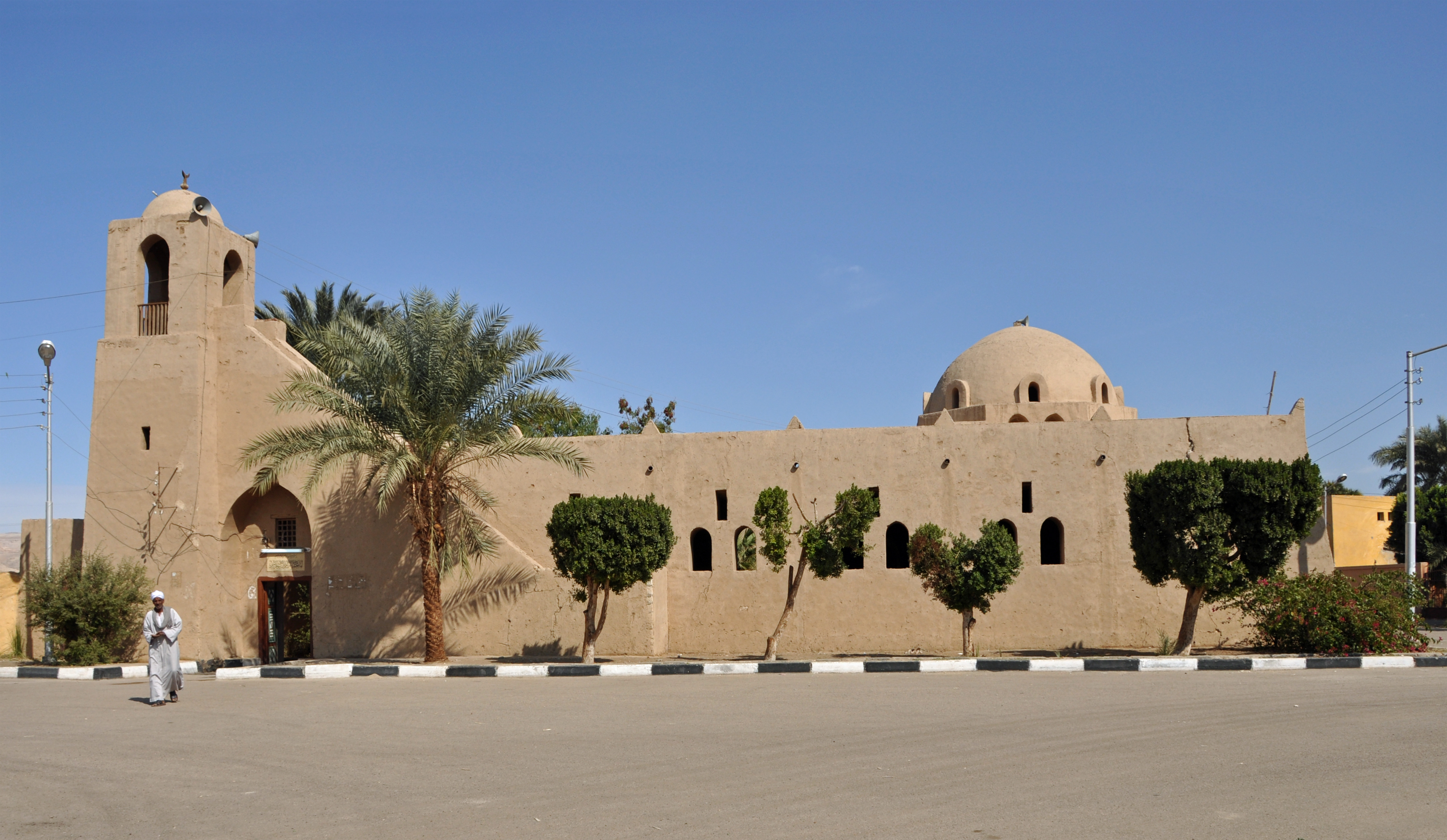
The mosque of New Gourna (1940s), designed by Hasan Fathy

From the 1930s, Modernism began to dominate Cairo's architecture, replacing the earlier revivalist styles. Among the prominent architects was Sayed Karim, who championed the International Style and Brutalism. He also founded the first Arabic-language magazine on architecture, al-'Imarah (Arabic: مجلة العِمارة), which promoted contemporary designs and was an important step in the development of modern Egypt's architectural culture.

Towards the mid-20th century, some Egyptian architects began challenging the dominance of Western styles and ideas. The most influential was Hassan Fathy (living 1900–1989), who began his career in the 1930s. He aimed to use traditional vernacular mud-brick construction, adapted to modern context. His architecture was "aimed at comforting its subjects toward ... modernity". The village of New Gourna (built 1945–1948), near Luxor, is an example of his works. Ramses Wissa Wassef, one of Fathy's students, is another example of this trend. He adapted features from Nubian and mudbrick architecture in Upper Egypt into his buildings.

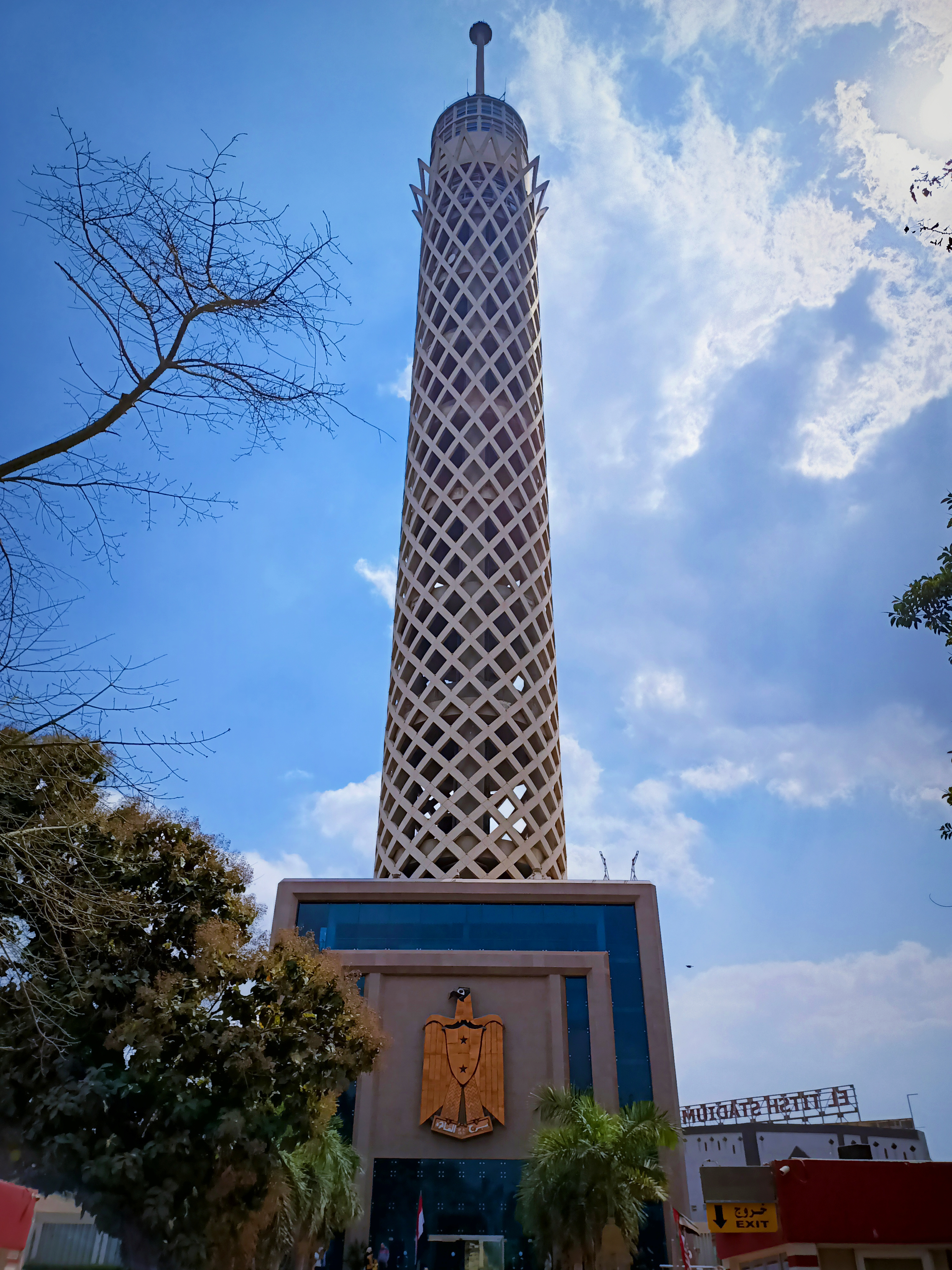
Cairo Tower (completed in 1961), designed by Naoum Shebib

There were repeated efforts in the 20th century to address the booming population through large-scale urban developments and housing projects in various locations. A number of new satellite cities were founded around Cairo with this intention. Newer public buildings and monuments also date from the second half of the 20th century after the 1952 revolution. In the 1950s President Gamal Abdel Nasser remodeled Tahrir Square, the symbolic heart of the capital. Next to the square, the new Arab League Headquarters was erected on the site of a demolished British army barracks. The Cairo Tower, a 187-meter tall observation tower with a lotus-motif design, was built between 1955 and 1961 and designed by Egyptian architect Naoum Shebib. It was the tallest all-concrete structure in the world upon completion and it is the most recognizable symbol of post-1952 Egyptian architecture. The Cairo Opera House, originally opened in 1869 under Khedive Isma'il and designed as an imitation of La Scala in Milan, burned down in 1971. It was replaced by a new opera house and cultural complex begun in 1985 and opened in 1988, designed by a Japanese architectural firm. In 1975, President Anwar Sadat opened the Unknown Soldier Memorial, designed in the shape of a hollow pyramid, in Cairo. (Sadat was later buried here after his assassination.)

=== 21st century ===
Postmodernism did not take hold in Cairo in the last decade of the 20th century as it did elsewhere; at least not consciously. At the turn of the millennium, historicist or pseudo-historicist trends began to reappear, as seen in the Supreme Court building (1999), which references ancient Egyptian architecture, and the Faisal Islamic Bank Tower (2000), which references historic Islamic architecture.

Bibliotheca Alexandrina in Alexandria (opened 2002)

In Alexandria, the idea of paying homage to its famous ancient library with a new building was floated as early as 1972. This was eventually realized as a massive new library, the Bibliotheca Alexandrina, which opened in 2002. It is shaped like an inclined cylinder or disk, with the outer walls made of granite carved with characters from all the world's alphabets.

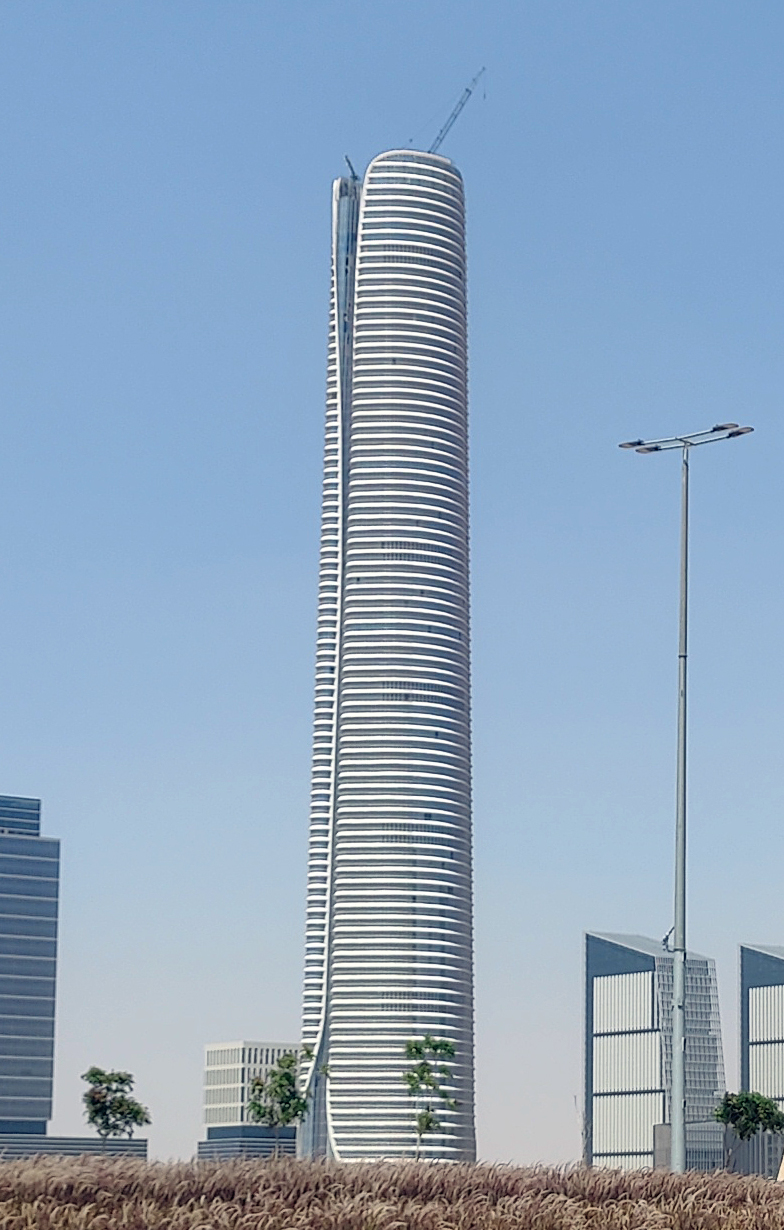
The Iconic Tower in the New Capital, Africa's first supertall building, opened in 2024.

In the tourist center of Sharm El Sheikh, the Al Sahaba Mosque, completed in 2017, is a fusion of Ottoman, Mamluk, and Fatimid styles. It was designed pro bono by Egyptian architect Fouad Tawfik Hafez.

=== Conservation challenges ===
Much of Egypt's 19th-century and 20th-century architecture has been vulnerable to demolition and redevelopment. Modernist architecture is often seen as having little cultural value and receives relatively little attention or documentation, despite the large volume of construction activity in cities like Cairo during the modern period. Egyptian law also requires buildings to be at least a hundred years old before being eligible for heritage status, leaving much of the country's more recent heritage unprotected.

In recent years, Alexandria's older urban heritage, much of it dating from the colonial period, has come under threat from poorly regulated demolitions and development. In Cairo, a large number of modern heritage buildings have disappeared, ranging from former villas to large-scale buildings and city blocs. Parts of Cairo's historic Northern Cemetery (also known as the City of the Dead), which contains funerary architecture built across many centuries, are also under threat from government infrastructure projects. Parts of the necropolis, mainly dating from the early 20th century, were demolished in 2020. The plans have been criticized by some scholars, architects, and archeologists. In Luxor, the historic Tawfiq Pasha Andraos Palace, built in 1897 near the ancient Luxor Temple, was demolished in 2021, sparking criticism and debate.

== See also ==
- List of Egyptian architects
