= Abu al-Makarim =

Coptic Orthodox priest

Abu l-Makārim Saʿdullāh ibn Jirjis ibn Masʿūd (Arabic: ابو المكارم سعد الله بن جرجس بن مسعود; died 1208) was a priest of the Coptic Orthodox Church of Alexandria in the thirteenth century. Abu al-Makarim is best known as the author of a famous work entitled History of Churches and Monasteries (Arabic: تاريخ ألكنائس وألأديرة). This was written around 1200.

Abu al-Makarim's work is one of the most important sources on the Coptic Church's life during his period and is frequently referenced by scholars of Coptic history.

The work first became known in the West when a portion of a manuscript of it was purchased in 1674 in Ottoman Egypt for three piastres by Johann Michael Vansleb. The manuscript is now in the Bibliothèque Nationale in Paris, ms. arabe 307, which manuscript is dated 1338 CE. A photographic copy of it is in the Coptic Museum in Cairo. This manuscript was edited and published by B.T.A. Evetts in 1895, with an English translation, as if Abū Ṣāliḥ the Armenian was the author, when he was merely the owner of the manuscript, as determined by the scholars Ugo Zanetti and Johannes den Heijer.

Another manuscript has since been discovered in Munich; and a third in Egypt.

An edition of the Egyptian manuscript was printed in Arabic in four volumes, with its volume 2 including the same portion published by Evetts and its volume 4 representing other travellers' reports. This edition was published by the Coptic monk and bishop Samuel al-Suryānī, in 1984-1985, titled in Arabic History of the Churches and Monasteries in the Twelfth Century by Abu l-Makārim, wrongly attributed to Abū Ṣāliḥ, the Armenian. An English translation of the first volume was published in Cairo, Abu al Makarem: History of the Churches and Monasteries in Lower Egypt in the Thirteenth Century in 1992.

Clara Ten Hacken has made a translation of the portion of the full text which relates to ancient Antioch.
