= White Monastery =

Coptic Orthodox monastery

- ⲡⲙⲟⲛⲁⲥⲧⲏⲣⲓⲟⲛ ⲛ̀ⲧⲉ ⲁⲡⲁ ϣⲉⲛⲟⲩϯ ⲡⲧⲱⲟⲩ ⲛ̀ⲁⲑⲣⲏⲃⲓ
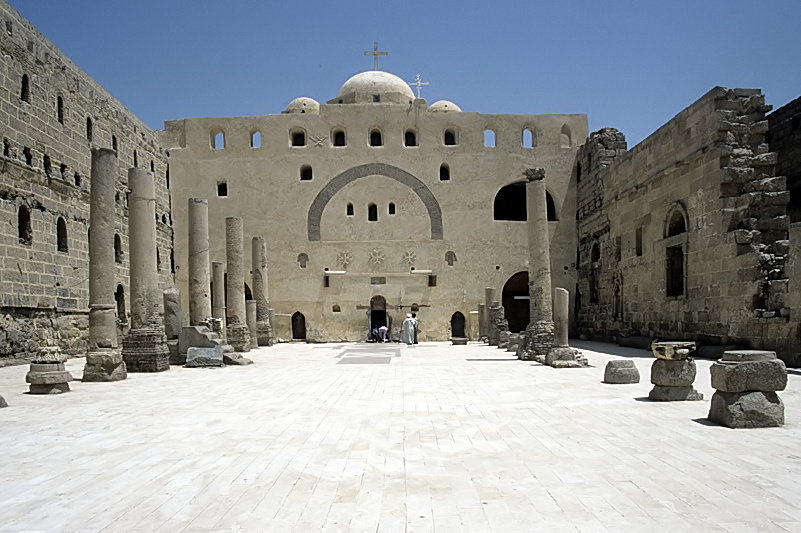
- The court of the monastery

- Location within Egypt

Monastery information
- Other name: Deir el-Abyad
- Established: 442
- Dedication: Shenoute
- Diocese: Coptic Orthodox Church of Alexandria

People
- Founder: Saint Pigol

Site
- Location: Sohag, Sohag Governorate
- Country: Egypt
- Coordinates: 26.534761°N 31.645694°E
- Public access: Yes

The Coptic White Monastery (Arabic: الدير أبيض), also The Monastery of Abba Shenouda (Coptic: ⲡⲙⲟⲛⲁⲥⲧⲏⲣⲓⲟⲛ ⲛ̀ⲧⲉ ⲁⲡⲁ ϣⲉⲛⲟⲩϯ) and The Athribian Monastery (Coptic: ⲡⲧⲱⲟⲩ ⲛ̀ⲁⲑⲣⲏⲃⲓ, romanized: eptōw enatʰrebi, lit. 'the mountain of Athribis') is a Coptic Orthodox monastery named after Saint Shenoute. It is located near the Upper Egyptian cities of Tahta and Sohag, and about two and a half miles (4.0 km) south-east of the Red Monastery.

The name of the monastery is derived from the colour of the white limestone of its outside walls. The White Monastery is architecturally similar to the Red Monastery. The monastery had one of the largest Coptic libraries ever known with over 1,000 codices of which 10% survive.

== History ==
=== Foundation ===
The monastery was founded by Saint Pigol (Coptic: ⲡⲓϫⲱⲗ), the maternal uncle of Shenoute, in 442^{[Questionable date: see here]}. However, it only became renowned after Shenoute succeeded his uncle as abbot of the monastery. From 30 monks, the population of the White Monastery increased to 2,200 monks and 1800 nuns by Shenoute's death in 466. The monastery also increased in size during this time to 12,800 acres (51.8 km^{2}), an area about 3000 times its original size. Such an area included cells, kitchens, and storehouses, the ruins of which can still be seen to the north, west, and south sides of the church complex.

Following the death of Shenouda, the monastic community of the White Monastery continued strong throughout the 5th century under the leadership of Saint Wissa (Coptic: ⲃⲏⲥⲁ) and later Saint Zenobius. However, the monastery began slowly to decline following the Muslim conquest of Egypt in 641. The state of decline can be attributed in part to the heavy taxes that the monasteries in Egypt had to endure. Such taxes put a great number of monasteries out of existence.

=== Middle Ages ===
In the middle of the 8th century, the Arab governor al-Qasim ibn Ubayd Allah forced his way into the monastery church with his female concubine on horseback. This resulted in the concubine falling to the ground and eventually to her death, along with the horse she was riding.

The monastery served as a host for Armenian monks in the 11th and the 12th centuries. This is indicated in the inscriptions found on the paintings of the central apse of the church, which date between 1076 and 1124. Among these Armenian monks was the artist Theodore of Kaysun, the Armenian Vizier Bahram, who became a monk after having been banished from his office during the Caliphate of the Fatimid caliph al-Hafiz (1135–1137). In 1168, the monastery was attacked by Shirkuh.

The monastery underwent major restorations between 1202 and 1259. In the 13th century, in the work attributed to Abu al-Makarim, it is mentioned that the monastery included a keep, which was probably built during the Middle Ages to protect the monastery from the attacks of the desert's bedouins. Abu al-Makarim also tells of an enclosure wall around the monastery within which a garden full of all sorts of trees existed. The lack of literary manuscripts after the 14th century indicates that the monastery was in an advanced state of decline from that time onwards. According to al-Maqrizi, who called it both the "White Monastery" and the "Monastery of St Shenoute", mentioned that in the 13th century, it lay in ruins and only the church remained in use.

=== Modern history ===
The monastery was visited by Johann Michael Vansleb in 1672 and by Richard Pococke in 1737. Both of them made an incorrect attribution of the foundation of the monastery to Helena of Constantinople, Emperor Constantine's mother. During the second half of the 18th century, the southwest corner of the surviving church-complex collapsed. In 1798, the monastery was sacked and totally burned down by the Mamluks. The destruction was mentioned by the French traveler Dominique Vivant, who visited the monastery on the day following its destruction. In 1802, under the direction of Muhammad Ali, parts of the monastery were rebuilt. In 1833, Robert Curzon visited the monastery and left a written record of his visit. In 1893, Fergusson published a plan of the church complex. However, the most significant contributions to the study of the monastery and its church were made by such visitors as Wladimir de Bock (1901), C. R. Peers (1904), Flinders Petrie (1907), Somers Clarke (1912), and Ugo Monneret de Villard (1925).

In 1907, the church complex experienced another repair which included the removal of the encrustation of brick work and the undercovering of the doorways. Then in the 1980s more restoration work took place on the walls and the columns of the church.

== Description of the monastery ==
The only surviving piece of the original monastery is its church complex, which was built in the Basilica style. It has six entrances: three centrally placed in the north, south, and west walls. The other three are located south of the west wall, east of the south wall, and east of the north wall. Its outer appearance resembles an Egyptian temple. It has a combination of exo- and eso-narthex leading into the body of the original church. This body, which is now an open courtyard, contains a nave flanked by two aisles. They are separated from the nave by long rows of columns with a returned isle in the west to define the eso-narthex. There existed atop these isles mezzanine galleries, as evidenced by the two rows of windows seen on the walls. The grand style of this 5th-century basilica includes an open courtyard measuring 172 feet by 76 feet, of which the nave occupies half that width.

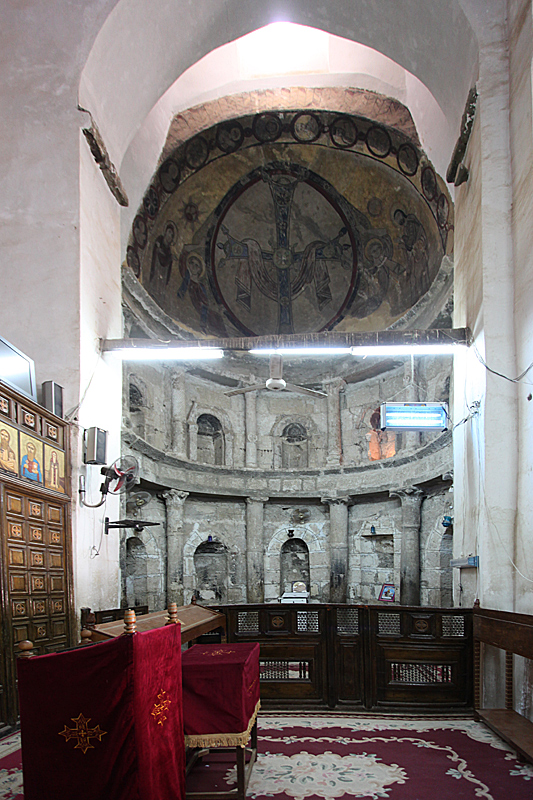
Southern apse of the monastery church

The current Church now occupies what used to be the choir and the sanctuary areas. This is separated from the open court by a solid red brick wall, of medieval construction, with doors and windows. The original sanctuary was built in a trefoil style with three apses. It is a step higher than the nave in the open court. The rectangular space, defined by the apses to its north, south and east sides, served as the altar for the basilica. Now the altar is located within the central or eastern apse. The rest of the space is now integrated into the nave of the current Church. There is also a new iconostasis made with solid wood and adorned by small icons on its top register. The current sanctuary in the central apse is actually divided into three. The middle one is dedicated to Saint Shenouda the Archimandrite, the southern one to the Mary, mother of Jesus, and the northern one to Saint George.

The original three apses are of magnificent construction. Each contains two registers of columns separated by a decorative frieze and surmounted by architraves. Between the columns lies the niches. The horizontal cross-section of the niches in each register alternates between rectangular and circular. The semidome of each is decorated with a beautiful design. Above the registers lies the semidome. There paintings can be distinguished in these semi-domes. The one in the central apse has a painting of the Christ Pantocrator and the four evangelists. In the northern apse, there is a depiction of the sleeping Virgin Mary. The southern apse has a representation of the resurrection with the two Marys and two angels.

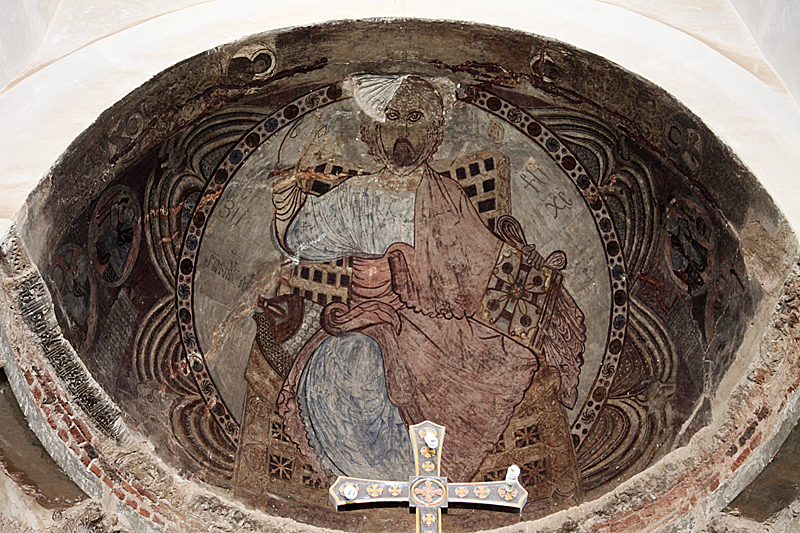
Painting of Jesus with Armenian and Greek letters

The church complex has several annexes along the east and south walls. The most significant is the great hall that runs alongside the south wall. This probably served the function of a women's chamber in the early days. It has a chamber at each of its east and west ends. The west chamber contains a well and it underwent reconstruction in the early 19th century. There are also two chambers south of the central apse and a third one to the north. On the south side, one chamber is rectangular with a font which is now used as a baptistery, and the second is circular with niches. On the north side, the chamber is square. There is another rectangular chamber west of the circular chamber and it is divided in half by two projecting buttresses.

There is a variety of building material employed in the construction of the church complex. This reflects the different stages that the monastery went through since the time of its foundation. The outer walls are of white limestone set in mortar with no bonding. They are sloped six degrees from vertical on the outside (original construction). The gargoyles and the door lintels are also of limestone, with the doorjambs being made of red granite. The source of these limestones is probably from ruins of nearby Ancient Egyptian temples, which Saint Shenouda the Archimandrite contributed to their demise figuratively and literally. The original nave columns are made of marble or granite with few later ones being of red bricks. Many of these columns are no longer standing. The paving of the nave is of limestone or granite slabs.

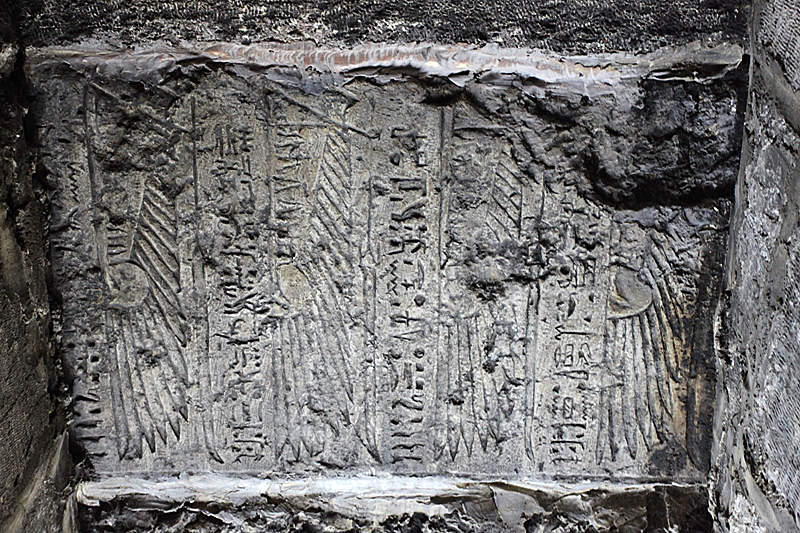
Roof of the north-east staircase of the monastery church which includes Ancient Egyptian hieroglyphs

The original sanctuary is now roofed with vaults of burnt bricks; originally, it had a wood roof. The nave, isles, and the great south hall (lateral narthex) are now without a roof; originally they had wood gabled roofs with galleries atop the isles. The wall between the exo-narthex and the body of the original church is of limestone. The great wall that defines the western boundary of the current church is made up of red bricks which encase the original columns and arches. This now is covered with a cream-color stucco layer. The four arches carrying the squinches of the central, original, sanctuary dome are also made up of red bricks except for the one toward the east which is of marble construction.

== The library ==
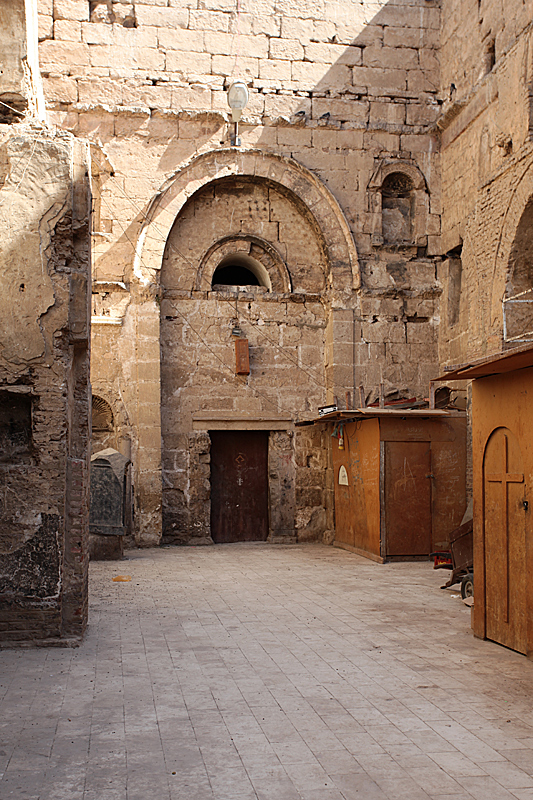
A library in the White Monastery

The literacy campaign, which Shenouda the Archimandrite waged in his monastery, reflected positively on the library of the monastery. With everyone in the monastery capable of reading and many skilled in writing manuscripts, the library must have been one of the greatest libraries of Christian Egypt. The library contained around 1,000 codices, averaging 200-300 pages each. Around 10% of these survived today in collections primarily located in Europe. This testimony is not only in the number of codices identified but also in the wide variety of subjects it possessed.

Today the library is scattered all over the world. Codices were dismembered with individual folios ending up in different libraries or museums. At times, even an individual folio ended up in different libraries which were thousands of miles apart. Serious effort has been undertaken to artificially regroup these codices from their Diaspora with photographic means. Mgr. Louis Théophile Lefort, a coptologist of Louvain, made the first comprehensive attempt toward achieving this monumental goal. However, his collection was a tragic victim of World War II. Currently, this task has been taken up by Tito Orlandi and his associates in the Sapienza University of Rome. There, they formed the Corpus dei Manoscritti Copti Letterari. They were able to identify hundreds of separate codices with the aid of the prior works that Coptic scholars had previously done.

The library contents, as mentioned above, has adorned many libraries and museums around the world from as early as the 19th century. The following is a partial list of those places that possess such fragments:

- Amsterdam, Rijksmuseum Amsterdam
- Berlin, Deutsche Staatsbibliothek
- Cairo, Coptic Museum
- Cairo, Egyptian Museum
- Cairo, Institut Français d'Archéologie Orientale
- Cambridge, Cambridge University Library
- Florence, Laurentian Library
- Saint Petersburg, Russian National Library
- London, British Library
- London, Eton College
- Louvain, Bibliothèque de l'Université
- Manchester, John Rylands University Library
- Michigan, University of Michigan Library
- Moscow, Pushkin Museum
- Naples, Biblioteca Nazionale Vittorio Emanuele III
- New York, The Morgan Library & Museum
- Oxford, Bodleian Library
- Paris, Bibliothèque nationale de France
- Paris, Musée du Louvre
- Strasbourg, Bibliothèque de l'Université
- Vatican City, Biblioteca Apostolica
- Venice, Biblioteca Naniana
- Vienna, Österreichische Nationalbibliothek

The ancient library of the White Monastery is rich in many categories such as biblical, hagiographical, liturgical, etc. This provides the researcher with good knowledge about what the monks were reading and what they were allowed to read at different stages of the monastery's development. However, the early times are not too well represented in the surviving fragments. This can be either attributed to their frequent use or simply that they were victims of time and of the decline of the monastery in later times. The dialect of these manuscripts were predominantly in Sahidic Coptic, which was perfected in its literary form by Saint Shenouda the Archimandrite. There were also some bilingual manuscripts. The early ones were in Sahidic Coptic and Greek, while the later ones had Sahidic Coptic and Arabic. The writing materials employed were mostly parchment, because of its prevalence, but some of the later ones were found on paper.

The first category, and most abundant, is the Biblical manuscripts. Nearly every book of the Old Testament, including the Deuterocanonical Books is represented. The only exception is some of the historical books, which were always in short supply in Egyptian monasteries. The New Testament, on the other hand is represented in its entirety though in a fragmentary shape.

A second category is the apocryphal Gospels, Acts, and Biblical lives that were frequently read in Egyptian monasteries. These include the Gospel of the Twelve, Gospel of Bartholomew, Acts of Thomas, Acts of Pilate, Life of the Virgin Mary, and History of Joseph the Carpenter.

A third category is the historical manuscripts, which are rare in any of the Coptic libraries found thus far. However, in the White Monastery one finds a substantial part of an ecclesiastical history manuscript. That manuscript deals with the history of the Coptic Orthodox Church of Alexandria in the 4th and 5th centuries. In addition, there are several fragments of codices that record the acts of the great Councils of Nicaea and Ephesus.

Another important category found in the library is the hagiographic texts. These are found in relative abundance in all monastic libraries, and the White Monastery is no exception. They are primarily intended for the spiritual edification of the monks rather than being accurate historical records of the saints. They include acts and related texts of many martyrs such as Saint Colluthus the Physician, Saints Cosmas and Damian, St. Philopater Mercurius, Saint Psote, Saint Theodore, Saint Victor, and many others. There are also the lives of many important saints of the Egyptian Church like Saint Anthony, Saint Athanasius, Saint Pachomius and his disciples, Saint Samuel the Confessor, and Saint Shenouda the Archimandrite to name just a few.

The richest and most significant category available is the writings of the fathers. This library has yielded a great number of manuscripts, preserving texts of the composition of Egyptian writers, as well as Coptic translation of Greek writings of Church Fathers. The most significant part of it is that of the remarkable works of Saint Shenouda the Archimandrite. Other writings includes those of Saint Wissa's sermons, the writings of Saint Pachomius and his disciples, and the Apophthegmata Patrum. Other texts of original Coptic composition include those of Constantine of Asyut, John of Burulus, and Rufus of Shotep. The group of Coptic translations of Greek writings includes those of Saint Peter of Alexandria, Saint Athanasius, Saint Theophilus, Saint Cyril the Great, and Saint Dioscorus. The Greek translations of non-Coptic Fathers include Saint Cyril of Jerusalem, Saint John Chrysostom, and Saint Severus of Antioch. Works of other authors are also found in that collection.

== See also ==
- Saint Shenouda the Archimandrite
- Codex Borgianus
- Uncial 070
- Early medieval domes

== Sources ==
- Monneret de Villard, U., "Les Couvents Pres de Sohag". 2 vol. Milan 1925–7
- Peers, C. R., "The White Monastery near Sohag Upper Egypt" Archaeological Journal 3,11 (61), 1904, 131–53
- Takla, H. N., "St. Shenouda the Archmandrite - His Life and Times". Los Angeles 1987.
- Timm, S., "Ad-Der al Abyad" In Das Christlich-Koptische Agypten in Arabischer Zeit. Vol 2 (D-F) pp. 601–38, Wiesbaden, 1984
- Blanke, Louise (30 August 2019). An Archaeology of Egyptian Monasticism: Settlement, Economy and Daily Life at the White Monastery Federation. Yale Egyptology. ISBN 978-1-950343-10-2.
- Capuani, Massimo; Meinardus, Otto F. A. (2002). Christian Egypt: Coptic Art and Monuments Through Two Millennia. Liturgical Press. ISBN 978-0-8146-2406-7.
- Evetts, B. T. A. (2001-12-31). The Churches and Monasteries of Egypt and Some Neighbouring Countries. Piscataway, NJ: Gorgias Press. doi:10.31826/9781463207656. ISBN 978-1-4632-0765-6.
- Gabra, Gawdat; Vivian, Tim (2002). Coptic Monasteries: Egypt's Monastic Art and Architecture. American University in Cairo Press. ISBN 978-977-424-691-3. JSTOR j.ctt15m7g74.
- Meinardus, Otto F. A. (2010-10-15). Two Thousand Years of Coptic Christianity. American University in Cairo Press. doi:10.5743/cairo/9789774247576.001.0001. ISBN 978-977-424-757-6.
- Images By Dr. Enrique Abreu 2010 : Images of both Red & White monasteries
