= Shenoute =

Egyptian abbot and saint (d. 465)

Saint Shenoute
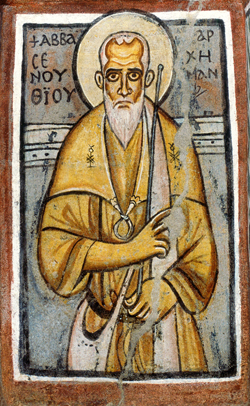

Archimandrite
- Born: Egypt
- Died: 1 July 465; Sohag, Egypt
- Venerated in: Oriental Orthodox Churches
- Major shrine: White Monastery
- Feast: 7 Epip

Shenoute of Atripe, also known as Shenoute the Great or Shenoute the Archimandrite (Coptic: Ⲁⲃⲃⲁ Ϣⲉⲛⲟⲩϯ ⲡⲓⲁⲣⲭⲓⲙⲁⲛ'ⲇⲣⲓⲧⲏⲥ; died 1 July 465), was an Egyptian saint, and the abbot of the White Monastery in Egypt. He is considered a saint by the Oriental Orthodox Churches and is one of the most renowned saints of the Coptic Orthodox Church.

== Early life ==
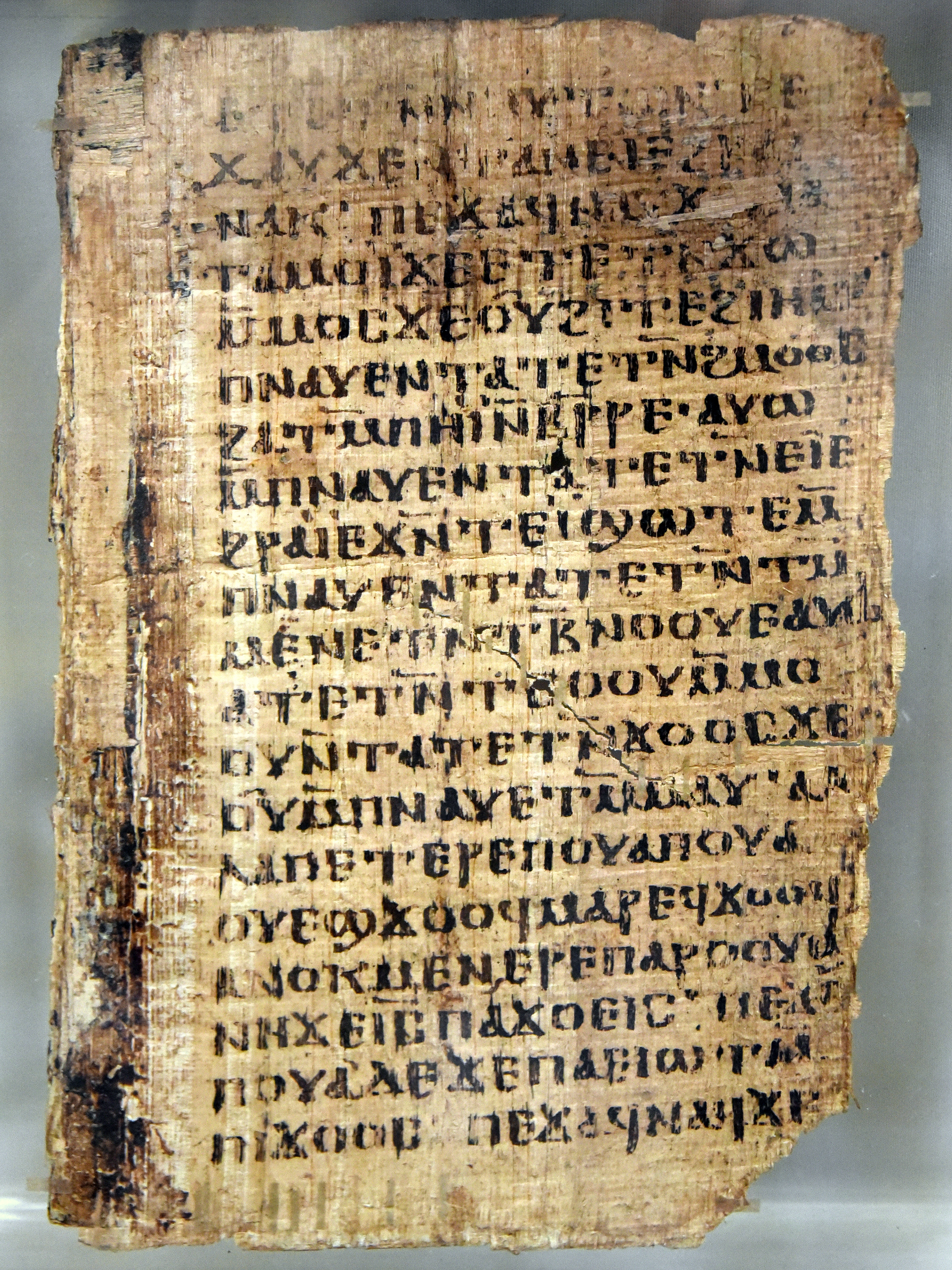
The Life of Shenoute, Sahidic Coptic script, papyrus, 6th-7th century CE. From Egypt. British Museum

Shenoute was born in the middle of the fourth century CE (the date 348 CE, often mentioned but not universally accepted, is based on an inscription in his monastery, dating from the 12th or 13th century).

He may have lived as late as 466; tradition ascribes to him an inordinately long life of 118 years.

Around 385 CE, Shenoute became the father of the White Monastery in Upper Egypt. It has often been assumed that Shenoute was the immediate successor of the White Monastery's founder, Pacol. However, the reconstruction of Shenoute's literary corpus made it possible to realize that Pacol died in the 370s and was then succeeded not by Shenoute but by another father, Eboh and that a spiritual crisis during Eboh's tenure as head of the White Monastery, a crisis which seems to have involved carnal sin, enabled Shenoute to come to prominence and to become Eboh's immediate successor.

Shenoute was known for his strict monastic regulations within the walls of the White Monastery.

== At the Council of Ephesus ==
Because of his popularity in Upper Egypt and his zeal, Shenoute was chosen by Cyril, the ecclesiarchal Patriarch of Alexandria, to accompany him in representing the Church of Alexandria at the Council of Ephesus in 431 CE. There he provided the moral support that Cyril needed to defeat the heresy of Nestorius, Bishop of Constantinople. The eventual exile of Nestorius to Akhmim, Shenoute's backyard, was a testimony to the impression Shenoute had made upon the council attendees.

== Death ==
On 7 Epip (14 July) 466 CE, following a short illness possibly brought upon by advanced age, Shenoute died in the presence of his monks.

== Influence on the monastic movement ==
From his uncle, Saint Pigol, Shenoute inherited a monastery based on the Pachomian system of cenobitic monasticism, though more austere and stringent. This made its followers few in number and probably promoted decline rather than growth. Shenoute implemented a more comprehensive system that was less stringent and more adaptable. This new system had an unusual component: a covenant (Koine Greek: διαθήκη, romanized: diathēkē) to be recited and adhered to literally by the new novices. It read as follows:

I vow before God in His Holy Place, the word which I have spoken with my mouth being my witness; I will not defile my body in any way, I will not steal, I will not bear false witness, I will not lie, I will not do anything deceitful secretly. If I transgressed what I have vowed, I will see the Kingdom of Heaven, but will not enter it. God before whom I made the covenant will destroy my soul and my body in the fiery Hell because I transgressed the covenant I made.

— Bell, the Life of Shenute by Besa, pp. 9–10

Transgressors of that covenant were expelled from the monastery, which was considered a near-death sentence for the peasant monks.

Another feature of Shenoute's monastic system was the requirement for the new novices to live outside the monastery before they were deemed worthy to be consecrated as monks. This seemed to be at odds with the Nitrian monastic system, which allowed the monks to live away from the monastic settlements only after they became proficient in the monastic life. Shenoute also utilized the monks' time, outside prayer and worship, in more varied tasks within the monastery than the Nitrian monks were exposed to. Aside from the traditional trades of rope and basket weaving, the monks engaged in weaving and tailoring linen, cultivating flax, leatherwork and shoemaking, writing and bookbinding, carpentry, metalworking, and pottery. All in all, Shenouda tried as much as possible to employ the monks in their old professions. Such activities made the monastery a vast self-supporting complex, which occupied some 20 square miles (52 km^{2}) of land.

As a monastic leader, Shenoute recognized the need for literacy among monks. He required all his monks and nuns to learn to read and encouraged more of them to pursue the art of writing manuscripts. This made the monastery increasingly appealing to belong to and consequently made the threat of expulsion more painful.

== Legacy as a national leader ==
In his laudatory Life of Saint Shenoute, his disciple and biographer Saint Wissa (Besa) recounts several incidents of Shenoute coming to the aid of poor Coptic peasants. One time he went to Akhmim to chastise a pagan because of the oppression he was inflicting on the poor (Vita #81–2). Another time he acted to eliminate the cause of grief of the peasants, that the pagan landlords of Paneheou forced them to buy the latter's spoiled wine (Vita #85–6). On a third occasion he risked his life to successfully ask for the freedom of the captives at Psoi from the hands of the Blemmyes warriors (Vita #89). He also at times appealed on behalf of the peasants to those in power, including the Roman emperor Theodosius I. In summary, Shenoute fully recognized the misery of his people and emerged as their sincere advocate and popular leader.

== Life as a writer ==
Shenoute’s writings come together to form the largest extant literary corpus by a single author in the Coptic language. He produced literary works for the Coptic Church comprising 25,000 folios.

He wrote in a style that was essentially his own, with writings based on a careful study of the scholastic rhetoric of his time, which displayed the wide and deep range of knowledge he possessed. They were adorned with endless quotations from the Holy Scriptures, a typical feature of patristic writings. The scriptures were quoted whenever a presented argument needed support. In doing so Shenoute also displayed an astonishing memory as he rendered these passages with amazing accuracy.

Shenoute's knowledge was not confined to the Holy Bible, as was the case for the majority of the monks in Egypt. He was fluent in both Coptic and Greek, and was fairly well acquainted with Greek thought and theology. The sprinkling of Greek loan-words in his writings was both extensive and sophisticated, and it was definitely not a product of his living environment. He also expressed knowledge of the works of Aristotle, Aristophanes, the Platonic school, and even some of the Greek legends. He certainly read some of Saint Athanasius' works like the Life of Saint Anthony and some of his homiletic works. Shenoute also knew the letters of Saint Anthony, some of the letters of Saint Pachomius, and most likely some of the works of Evagrius. His knowledge further extended to such popular non-canonical texts as the Acts of Archelaus and the Gospel of Thomas.

The writing of Saint Shenoute can be grouped into four categories:

- Moral sermons: This category includes the richest collection that have survived from Shenoute's writings. Among his works here is one about the disobedience to clerics De Disoboedientia ad Clericos, in which he stressed the benefit of obedience and the punishment of the disobedient. He also wrote about the Nativity and the glorification of the Lord, where he discussed free will and the place of chastity in the monastic life De Castitate et Nativitate.
- Sermons against the pagans: This category represents an important side of Shenoute's thinking. In one place, he portrayed the pagans as worse than demons whose idols shall rightly be destroyed by the Christians. In another sermon he aimed his attack against a pagan, probably a magistrate, who troubles the monks Adversus Saturnum. In a third sermon he attacks the concept of fate, in the opinion of the idolaters, as the controlling factor in the life of a person. He encounters with the teaching that nothing actually happens without the will of God Contra Idolatras, de Spatio Vitae.
- Sermons against the heretics: This category is similar conceptually to the preceding one. Here Shenoute directs his attack against the heretics who corrupted the faith. One encounters in this category one of Shenoute's longest works, which was probably written as a treatise rather than just a sermon. This is the work against the Origenists and the Gnostics Contra Origenistas et Gnosticos. The aim of this work was to oppose heretics in general and Origenists in particular, with regards to their apocryphal books that they used and circulated. He also touched upon the subjects of the plurality of the worlds, the position and the work of the Savior, and the meaning of Easter. Other subjects mentioned in the treatise included the relationship between the Father and the Son, the origin of souls, Christ's Conception, the Eucharist, resurrection of the body, and the four elements. Among the other works within this category were against the Melitians, in regard to the multiple celebration of the Eucharist in one day; against the Manichaeans, concerning the value of the Old Testament alongside the New Testament; and against Nestorius in relations to the preexistence of Christ before His birth from the Virgin.
- Sermons based on interviews with magistrates that visited him: This final category represents sermons that were based on miscellaneous interviews that he held with magistrates who visited him as a consequence of his fame and great authority. In those sermons Shenoute touches upon such arguments as the appropriateness of him correcting even generals in spiritual matters, the dimensions of the sky and the earth, the devil and free will, and the punishment of sinners. He also discussed the duties of judges and other such important personages as bishops, wealthy people, and generals.

As more and more identifications of Saint Shenoute's literary works are made, his contribution to Coptic literature appears to be even greater than previously assumed. On the one hand, it is becoming clear that he treated a wide range of subjects, not only monastic ones. This suggests a more favorable assessment of the theological character of his writing, his spirituality, and his moral and nationalistic behavior. On the other hand, he accepted the inclusion of literary activity in the religious field. This sets him apart from the Pachomian system that tended to treat religious literature as mere written instructions with no regard to style being given. He further developed a style that is clearly a product of careful study of the scholastic Greek rhetoric of his time.

== Monasteries named after Saint Shenoute ==
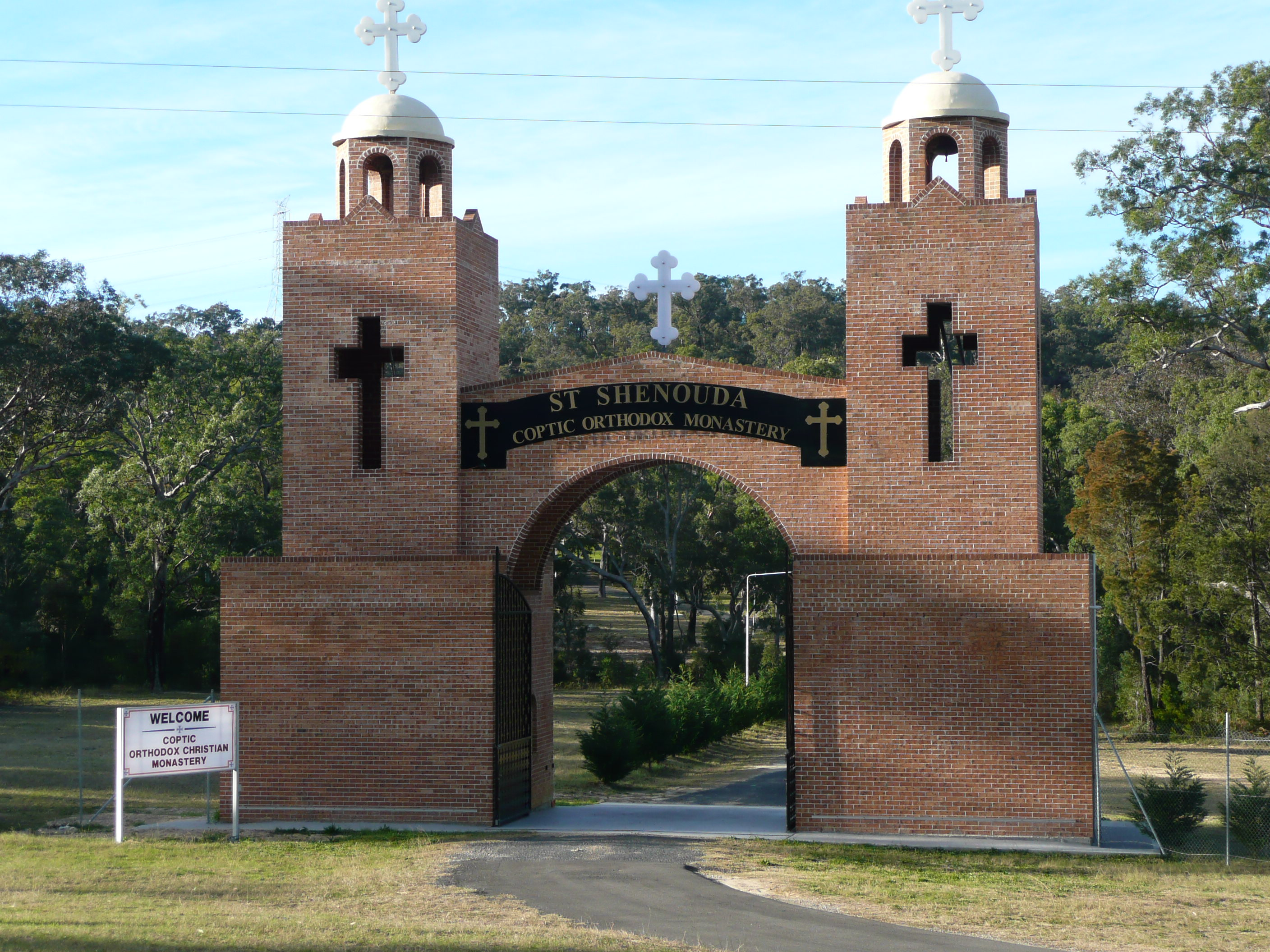
St. Shenouda Monastery in New South Wales, Australia

Four Coptic Orthodox monasteries worldwide are named after Saint Shenouda the Archimandrite, namely:

- Monastery of Saint Shenouda near Sohag, Egypt, also known as the White Monastery
- Monastery of Saint Shenouda in Milan, Italy
- Coptic Monastery of St. Shenouda in Rochester, New York, U.S.
- St. Shenouda Coptic Orthodox Monastery in Putty, New South Wales, Australia

There is also a Coptic Orthodox church - St. Mary and St. Shenouda - in Coulsdon, England.

== Works and translations ==
There has been difficulty in accessing and reconstructing the works of Shenoute for a variety of readings. The number of legible manuscripts his works survive in are not many, and he wrote in Coptic, which is a language that ceased in use as a spoken language in the Middle Ages, which added to the obscurity of his writings. For a long time, his works stopped being transmitted, and the remaining manuscripts were subject to decay from then on. Shenoute was responsible for collecting his own literary works into two collections, which were then transmitted. These were the Canons and the Discourses (or Logoi). Johannes Leipoldt published several volumes of his works, although he did so without access to all the manuscripts and so did not produce a critical edition. The transmission and structure of these two collections were first reconstructed in a dissertation by Stephen Emmel. Dwight Young has published some Coptic editions of this work with English translation. Bentley Layton has additionally published new Coptic texts of his rule and their translations.
