= Johann Michael Vansleb =

German theologian (1635–1679)

Johann Michael Vansleb (1 November 1635 – 1679) was a German theologian, linguist and Egypt traveller. He converted to Catholicism and was a member of the Dominican Order from 1666.

(Depending on the language of publication, his name is spelled a number of different ways including: Wansleben, Vansleben, Vanslebio, Vanslebius, Vanslep, Wanslebio, Wanslebius, J. M. Vansleb, Giovanni Michele, F. Vansleb (F for Father), P. Vansleb or Jean.)

== Biography ==
Vansleb was born in Erfurt. In 1663, after a long stay in London, Vansleb planned a journey to Ethiopia in search of religious manuscripts for his patron Ernest I, Duke of Saxe-Gotha. He never got beyond Egypt, however. It was while staying in Rome, during his return voyage, that he converted to Catholicism.

In the service of Jean-Baptiste Colbert, Vansleb made another attempt to journey to Ethiopia, and once again went no further than Egypt. Beginning his travels from Marseille on 20 May 1671, Vansleb felt sick on arrival in Cyprus (which he explained as caused by the plague then scouring the island). Despite being very sick for an extended time (and preparing to leave this world, as he explains) he managed to visit Tripoli, Damascus, Aleppo and Sidon during the next 10 months, finally arriving in Damietta, Egypt, in March 1672.

Vansleb travelled extensively in Egypt during the next 12 months, making a journey as far down as Sohag, and produced one of the earliest accounts of Upper Egypt: documenting the land, the people (especially the Coptic community), and pharaonic monuments such as the Giza pyramids, the Sphinx and the pyramids of Hawara, as well as Coptic monuments, including the White Monastery. One of his stated missions was to reach Esna, but he never travelled that far up the Nile. Instead he relates a report from two Capuchin missionary brothers, P. Protais and Charles-François d'Orléans, who had visited all the main sites of Upper Egypt in 1668.

Contemporary accounts relate that Vansleb's account was received with mixed feelings. Vansleb is a keen observer, repeatedly trying to get to the bottom of things, yet at other times accepting obscure and spurious explanations without much resistance, for example on the mating rituals of the Nile crocodile.

== Works ==
- Ludolf, Hiob, Lexicon Aethiopico-Latinum, Ed. by J. M. Wansleben, London 1661.
- Nouvelle Relation En forme de Iournal, D´vn Voyage Fait en Egypte. Par le P. Vansleb, R.D., en 1672 & 1673. Paris. chez Estienne Michallet, 1677.

The Present State of Egypt: or A New Relation of a Late Voyage into That Kingdom Performed in the Years 1672 and 1673, London, 1678. (English translation)

== Sources ==
- Hiob Ludolf
- The Present State of Egypt: or A New Relation of a Late Voyage into That Kingdom Performed in the Years 1672 and 1673, London, 1678.
- Alastair Hamilton (ed.), Johann Michael Wansleben's Travels in the Levant, 1671-1674, Leiden: Brill, 2018.
- Alastair Hamilton and Maurits van den Boogert (eds.), Johann Michael Wansleben’s Travels in Turkey, 1673-1676, Leiden: Brill, 2023.
- Asaph Ben-Tov, Jan Loop, and Martin Mulsow (eds.), Hiob Ludolf and Johann Michael Wansleben, Leiden: Brill, 2023.
