= Monastery of Saint Anthony =

Monastery in Egypt

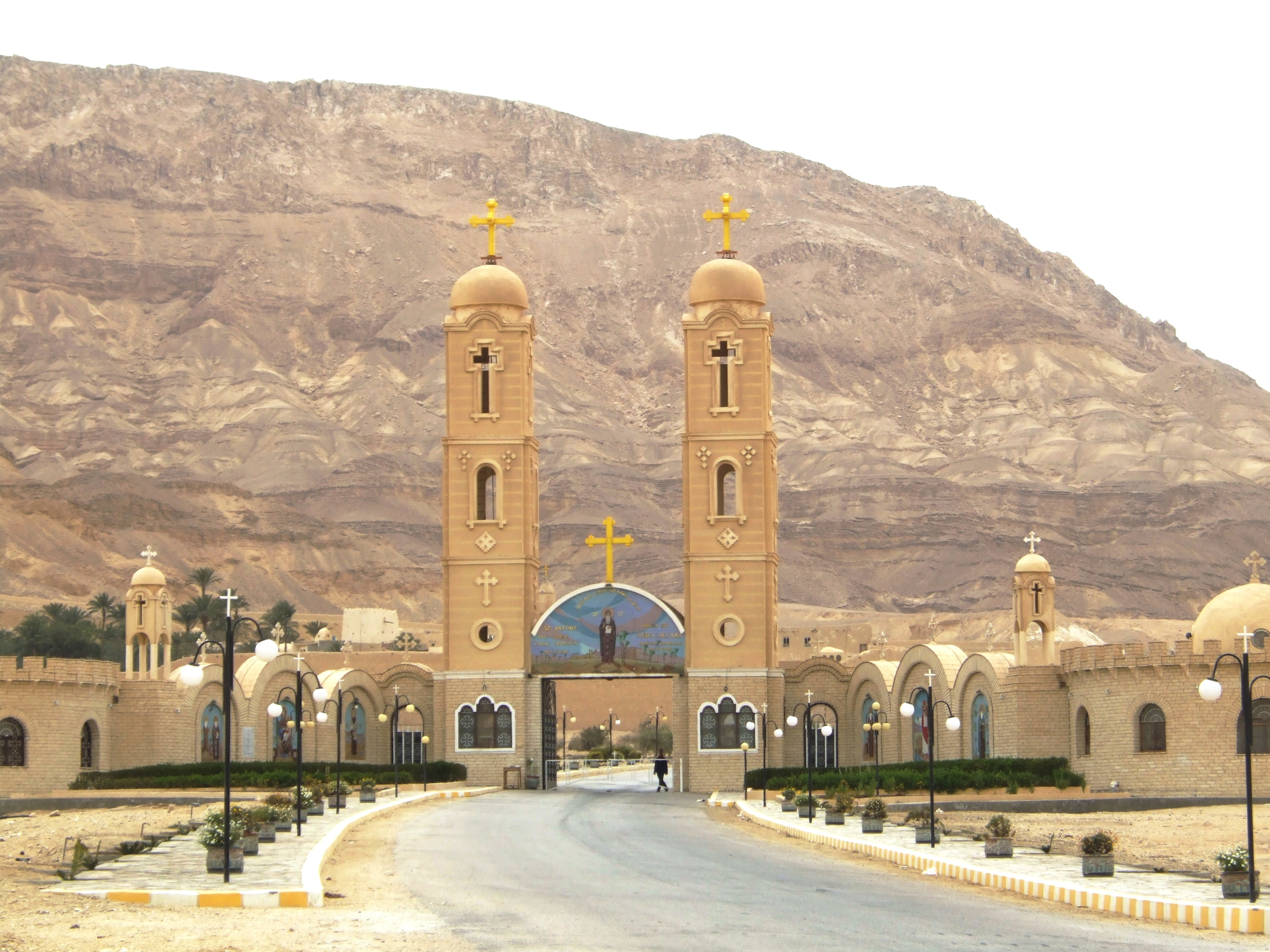

- Location within Egypt

Monastery information
- Other name: Deir Mar Antonios
- Established: 300; 1726 years ago
- Dedication: Saint Anthony the Great
- Diocese: Coptic Orthodox Church of Alexandria

People
- Founder: Saint Anthony the Great

Site
- Location: Red Sea Governorate
- Country: Egypt
- Coordinates: 28.92°N 32.35°E
- Visible remains: church, mill, bakery, gardens, and cave
- Public access: Yes

The Monastery of Saint Anthony is a Coptic Orthodox monastery standing in an oasis in the Eastern Desert of Egypt, in the northern part of the Red Sea Governorate close to the border with the Suez Governorate.

Hidden deep in the Red Sea Mountains, it is located 334 km (208 mi) southeast of Cairo and can be reached from Cairo in just 5 to 6 hours. The Monastery of Saint Anthony was established by the followers of Anthony the Great, an early Christian monk. The monastery is one of the most prominent in Egypt and has strongly influenced the formation of several Coptic institutions, and has promoted monasticism in general. Several patriarchs have come from the monastery, and several hundred pilgrims visit it each day.

In 2002, the Egyptian government began what was to be an 8-year, $14.5 million project to restore the monastery. The modern monastery is a self-contained village with gardens, a mill, a bakery and five churches. It has become a popular destination for Egyptians, offering Egyptian Christians religious retreats as well as family excursions.

== Life of Saint Anthony ==
Saint Anthony is a Christian saint who was born to a wealthy family in Lower Egypt around 251 AD. He was orphaned at the age of eight years. Most of what is known about him comes from the biographical work of Athanasius of Alexandria, Vita Antonii. This biography depicts Anthony as an illiterate and holy man who through his existence in a primordial landscape received an absolute connection to divine truth. The moment that St. Anthony dedicated his life to God and the church was due to the words he heard from Mark in which he was told to give up all of his belongings and seek God. At the age of 34, Anthony gave away all of his property and worldly possessions; he ventured into the Eastern Desert to seek a life of humility, solitude, and spiritual reflection. Saint Anthony took the words he heard in a literal sense and that is what caused him to venture into the desert to live a life of asceticism. He made his abode in a small cave where he lived ascetically. Although St. Anthony was not the first monk, he attracted many followers and disciples, and is one of the fathers of modern Christian monasticism.

== History ==
=== Origins ===
A few years after the death of Saint Anthony, his followers settled around the place where the hermit lived. The Monastery of Saint Anthony was built between 298 and 300 during the reign of Constantius Chlorus. In the original settlement, his followers established only the most essential buildings. Isolation was stressed. They lived in solitary cells surrounding a communal worship center where they performed the Divine Liturgy. They took their daily meals in a basic refectory. As time passed, the focus on asceticism diminished, and St. Anthony's followers began to develop closer relationships with one another in order to foster safety, convenience, and mutual fellowship. The life of an Antonian monk thus slowly evolved from one of solitary asceticism to one that allowed a communal way of living.

=== The Monastery as a refuge (400–800) ===
In the sixth and seventh centuries, many monks from the monasteries of Scetes fled to the Monastery of Saint Anthony in order to escape frequent attack by Bedouins and Berbers. During this time, the monastery experienced a constantly shifting and sometimes mutual occupation by the Coptic monks from Scetes and by the Melkite monks from the east. In 615, John the Merciful, the Melkite Patriarch, sent Anastasius of Persia, the head of the Monastery of St. Anthony at that time, large sums of money and asked him to take some Melkite monks who were persecuted by the Persians. These Melkite monks then continued to oversee the monastery until the late 8th century.

In 790 Coptic monks from the Monastery of Saint Macarius the Great in the Desert of Scetis disguised themselves as Bedouins in an attempt to steal the earthly remains of St. John the Short, who had lived and died in the Monastery of St. Anthony in the 5th century. The Ethiopian Synaxarium describes how they deceived the Melkite monks to accomplish this task:

it was not possible for them to fulfill their mission for the moment, for the body of the saint was guarded by the Melkite Chalcedonians who dwelt in the sanctuary. Then the judge from among the Arabs said to the Melkite bishop who sat in the sanctuary: ‘make all your men get out of the church, for I wish to enter the church myself and stay here this night.’ The bishop did as the judge commanded, and the Coptic Monks made ready their beasts outside the town and entered by night and took the body and returned to the desert of Scetis.

=== Peace and persecution (800–1300) ===
Although the monastery of St. Anthony enjoyed relative peace and security in its remote area, there were short periods of intense persecution. The monastery itself was plundered a number of times by the Bedouins of the Eastern Desert, who partly destroyed it in the 11th century. There was also a rebellion by the Kurds and the Turks during this time. When their leader Nasir al-Dawla was defeated, the remains of his army invaded and pillaged the Monastery of St. Anthony as well as the nearby Monastery of Saint Paul the Anchorite. The monastery was restored in the 12th century, and it flourished throughout the next few centuries. A fortress-like structure was also built around the monastery for protection from invaders. Abu al-Makarim describes the unparalleled excellence of the monastery in the beginning of the 13th century:

This monastery possesses many endowments and possessions at Misr. It is surrounded by a fortified wall. It contains many monks. Within the wall there is a large garden, containing fruitful palm trees, and apple trees, and pear trees, and pomegranates, and other trees besides beds of vegetables, and three springs of perpetually flowing water, with which the garden is irrigated and which the monks drink. One feddan and a sixth in the garden form a vineyard, which supplies all that is needed, and it is said that the number of the palms which the garden contains amounts to a thousand trees, and there stands in it a large well-built qasr… There is nothing like it among the other monasteries inhabited by Egyptian monks.

=== Early European visitors (1300–1800) ===
During the later crusades, European priests and diplomats began to tour Egypt as a part of their pilgrimage to the Holy Land. Ludolph of Suchem, a parish priest in the diocese of Paderborn, mentions his visits to the “many cells and hermitages of holy fathers,” many of which live under St. Anthony. In his “Description of the Holy Land”, he describes the miraculous fountain of St. Anthony: “In this desert there is a place beneath an exceeding tall and narrow rock, wherein St. Anthony used to dwell, and from out of the rock there flows a stream for half a stone’s throw, until it is lost in the sand… this place is visited by many for devotions and pleasure, and also by the grace of God and in honor of St. Anthony many sicknesses are healed and driven away by the fountain.”

In 1395, during the Crusade of Nicopolis, Ogier VIII d'Anglure journeyed to Egypt with several French pilgrims. He compared the Monastery of St. Anthony to the Saint Catherine's Monastery, stating that it was even more beautiful and noted the holiness and charity of the Jacobite monks. By the early 15th century, the monastery had become an established pilgrimage destination and it was commonplace for pilgrims to inscribe their name, coat-of-arms, and date of arrival on the walls of the monastery.

In the late 15th century, the monastery was devastated by the same Bedouins the monastery employed, and all of the monks were killed. It then followed that Syrian monks began to occupy the monastery, and helped in the rebuilding of the monastery at the beginning of the 16th century. After the restoration of the monastery, Ethiopian and Egyptian monks co-inhabited the monastery for some time. However, the monastery slowly fell completely into ruin and the few monks that lived there greatly relied on the support from the nearby village of Bush. From then until the 19th century, there are various accounts of travelers who stopped by the monastery, but the monastery is only briefly mentioned in passing. It is known that Franciscan missionaries sometimes used the monastery as a base to prepare missionaries in the 17th century. However, the monastery was in such disarray that it lacked even a door, and travelers had to enter via a rope and basket operated with a pulley system.

=== Modern history (from 1900) ===
Before the dawn of the 20th century, the only way to get to the monastery was by way of the monthly camel caravans which brought in food and other necessities from the nearby village of Bush. A journey along the desert path that extended from Kuraymat, a city along the Nile in between Beni Suef and Helwan, to the monastery used to take three to four days. The monastery received very few visitors, but those who did come were often distinguished in status, such as Georges Cogordan, the French ambassador to Egypt in 1901, and Johann Georg, Duke of Saxony.

The monastery became much more accessible after the opening of the Suez–Ras Gharib Road in 1946, and can now be reached from Cairo in just five to six hours. During the first decade after construction, the number of foreigner visitors greatly increased, with about 370 visitors between 1953 and 1958. Since then, the monastery has become a more popular destination for Egyptians, offering Egyptian Christians religious retreats as well as family excursions. Now on holiday weekends there are typically more than a thousand visitors.

== Structure ==
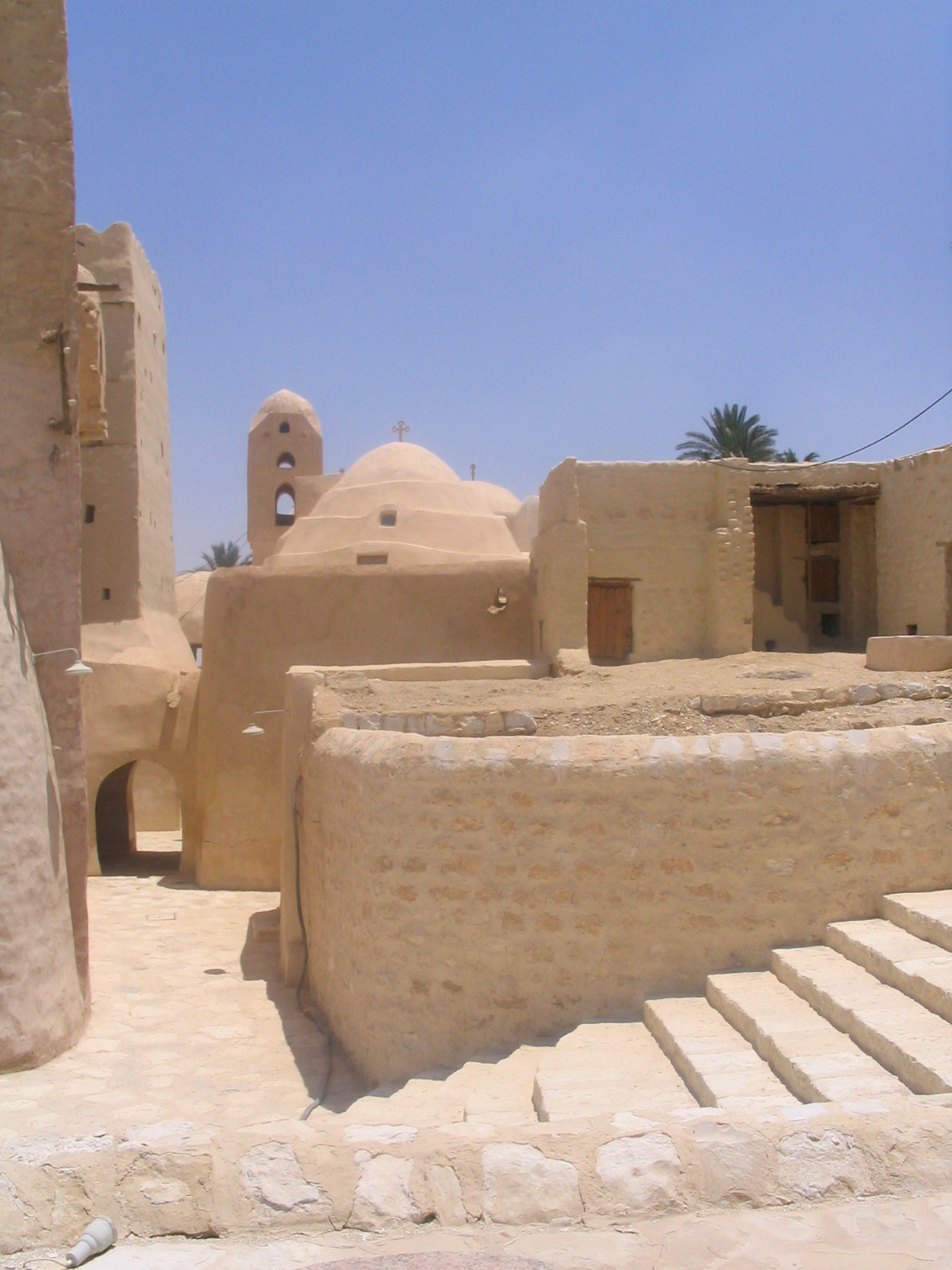
The interior of St. Anthony's Monastery.

The modern monastery is a self-contained village with gardens, a mill, a bakery and five churches. The walls are adorned with paintings of knights in bright colors and hermits in more subdued colors. The wall paintings have been worn over the centuries by soot, candle grease, oil and dust. In a collaborative effort between the Supreme Council of Antiquities and the American Research Center in Egypt, restoration has been undertaken on the paintings. The oldest paintings in the monastery date to the 7th and 8th centuries, while the newest date to the 13th.

=== Churches ===
==== The Medieval Church of St. Anthony ====
Medieval apse painting of Christ in majesty in the Church of St. Anthony

This church dates back to the 12th century and has a central sanctuary with a very small apse, two lateral sanctuaries, and a small choir. The nave has two bays with two large domes and a wide arch between them. Most of the church's walls and domes are covered with frescos. There is a small sanctuary dedicated to the four beasts of the Apocalypse in the southwestern corner, and their representations are depicted on the walls. The soffit of the arch above the door is decorated with a scene of Christ in mandorla flanked by busts of the twelve apostles. This is the oldest painting in the church, and dates from the 7th century. A figure of a decorated cross is in the apse. The body of St. Justus the monk is kept in a passage along the outer southern wall that connects to the adjoining Church of the Apostles.

==== The Church of the Apostles ====
This church, dedicated to the saints Peter and Paul, was renovated in 1772 AD by the Copt Lutfallah Shaker. The church has twelve domes. Nine of the domes roof the nave and the other three are over the sanctuaries, which are characterized by inlaid wooden screens. In 2005, the monks' cells dating to the 4th century – the oldest ever found – were discovered beneath the Church of the Apostles.

==== The Church of St. Mark the Ascetic ====
This church was renovated in 1766 by Hasaballah al-Bayadi and also has twelve domes. It was built in the 15th century on the spot of Saint Mark the Ascetic's cell.

==== The Church of the Virgin Mary and The Church of St. Michael ====
These two churches are north of the Church of St. Anthony and their structures resemble towers. The western building houses storage rooms and the refectory on the ground floor. The Church of the Virgin Mary is on the upper floor and has an inlaid screen extending over the whole breadth of the church. The eastern building is the tower of the monastery, and the Church of St Michael the Archangel is on the third floor of the tower.

=== The library ===
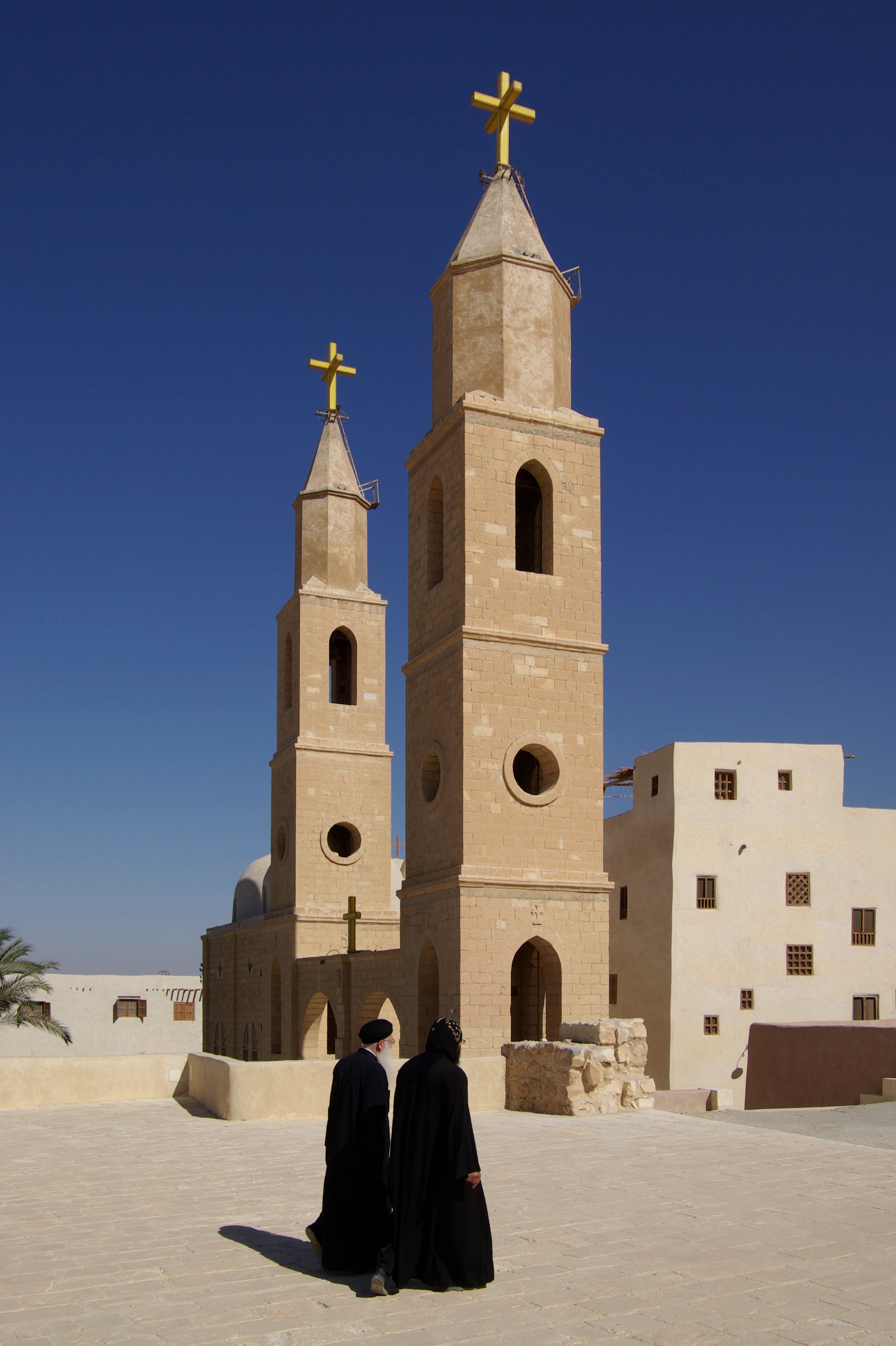
Monastery of Saint Anthony, Egypt.

The library was originally intended to be a church by Pope Cyril IV, but because of its deviation from the eastern direction it was never consecrated and thus became the library. It contains a rich collection of printed books and the largest collection of Coptic manuscripts in Egypt, which amount to some 1,863 volumes. The library contained many more volumes in the past. The present collection has been significantly reduced by the Bedouins who plundered the monastery and used many of the manuscripts as cooking fuel.

=== The cave of St. Anthony ===
The cave where Saint Anthony lived as a hermit is a 2km (1.2 mile) hike from the monastery and is 680 metres (2200 feet) above the Red Sea level. It is a small natural hole in the rocks adjacent to the southern part of Mount Galala. Visitors can ascend the winding trail of stairs from the monastery to the cavern in about one hour. The hermitage of St. Anthony is an extremely small space about 7 meters from the narrow opening of the cave.

== Restoration ==
In 2002, the Egyptian government began what was to be an 8-year, $14.5 million project to restore the monastery. Workers renovated the main surrounding wall of the monastery, the two main churches, the monks' living quarters, and a defensive tower. A modern sewage system was also added. Archeologists from the American Research Center in Egypt restored paintings inside the Saint Anthony's Church.

During the renovations, archaeologists uncovered the ruins of the original monks' working quarters from the 4th century. The remains are now covered by a glass floor and are viewable by visitors. The restored monastery is now open to the public. The renovations were unveiled shortly after a violent attack on Christians in Egypt and have been touted by the government as evidence of peaceful Muslim-Christian coexistence.

== The monks ==
Coptic leaders, the patriarch, the metropolitans, and the bishops have always been recruited from among the desert monks. In the 1960s, Anba Shenudah initiated the Sunday School movement, which encouraged educated young men to forsake worldly pleasures and instead join their desert fathers. Since the movement began, the total number of monks had more than tripled within the first 25 years, and many of these young ascetics have also been promoted to the episcopacy. At the Monastery of Saint Anthony the number of monks increased from 24 in 1960 to 69 in 1986. By 2010 about 120 monks and priests lived in the community.

In the past, the overwhelming majority of the monks in residence were 50 years of age or older, and through the tradition of the other desert fathers, they often (but not always, e.g. Saint Arsenius) came from simple backgrounds. St. Macarius the Great was a camel herder; St. Macarius of Alexandria was a small shopkeeper; St. Apollo was a goat herder, and St. Paphnutius and St. Pambo were illiterate. This trend has reversed since the revival of monasticism in Egypt in the 1960s. Today, monks are well-educated young men with extensive academic and professional backgrounds in the scientific fields such as engineering, medicine, pharmacy, and architecture.

=== Popes from the Monastery of St. Anthony ===
1. Pope Gabriel VI (1466–1474)
2. Pope John XV (1619–1629)
3. Pope Mark VI (1646–1656)
4. Pope John XVI (1676–1718)
5. Pope Peter VI (1718–1726)
6. Pope John XVII (1727–1745)
7. Pope Mark VII (1745–1769)
8. Pope John XVIII (1769–1796)
9. Pope Mark VIII (1796–1809)
10. Pope Peter VII (1809–1852)
11. Pope Cyril IV (1854–1861)
12. Pope Joseph II (1946–1956)

=== Abbot ===
As of 1991 the bishop and abbot of the Monastery of Saint Anthony was Bishop Yostos.

== Significance for Coptic Christians ==
The monastic movement in Egypt experienced an unprecedented renaissance under the Patriarchate of Papa Avva Kyrillos VI (1959–1971), and has significantly contributed to a revival in the spiritual vitality of the Coptic church. The construction of a desert road leading to the monastery has lifted the monastery out of geographic isolation and brought it within reach of the masses. It has now become a popular pilgrimage site that can be reached within a few hours by bus or car from a major city. Over a million people, including both Egyptian Christians and foreigners, visit each year. Contrary to the exclusive ascetic functions of monasteries in the past, the monastery now also serves as a centre for Coptic Christians where they can organize and attend spiritual retreats, youth programs, and religious conferences. Today, the monastery is accessible from Cairo, Suez or Hurghada.

== Gallery ==
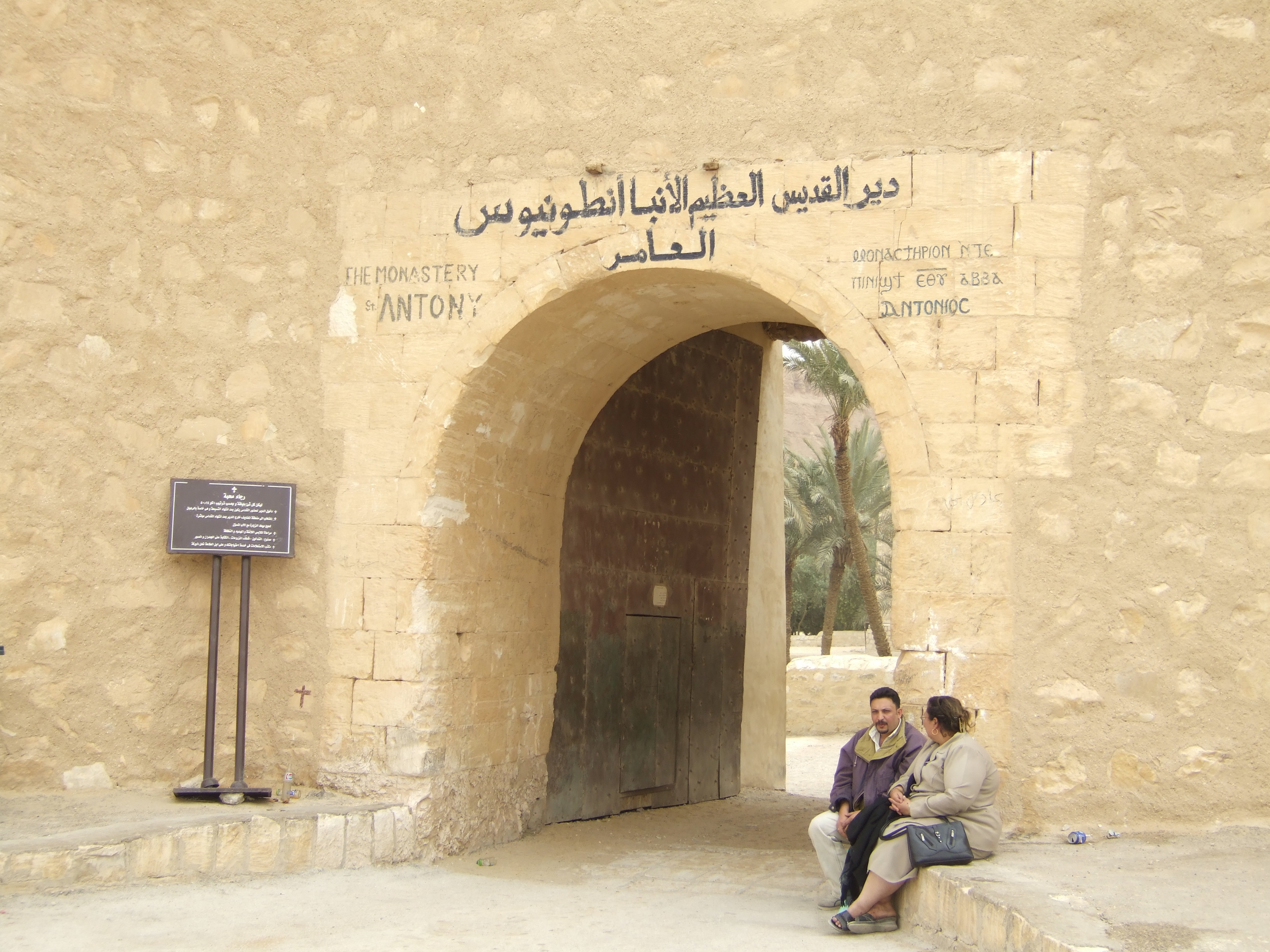

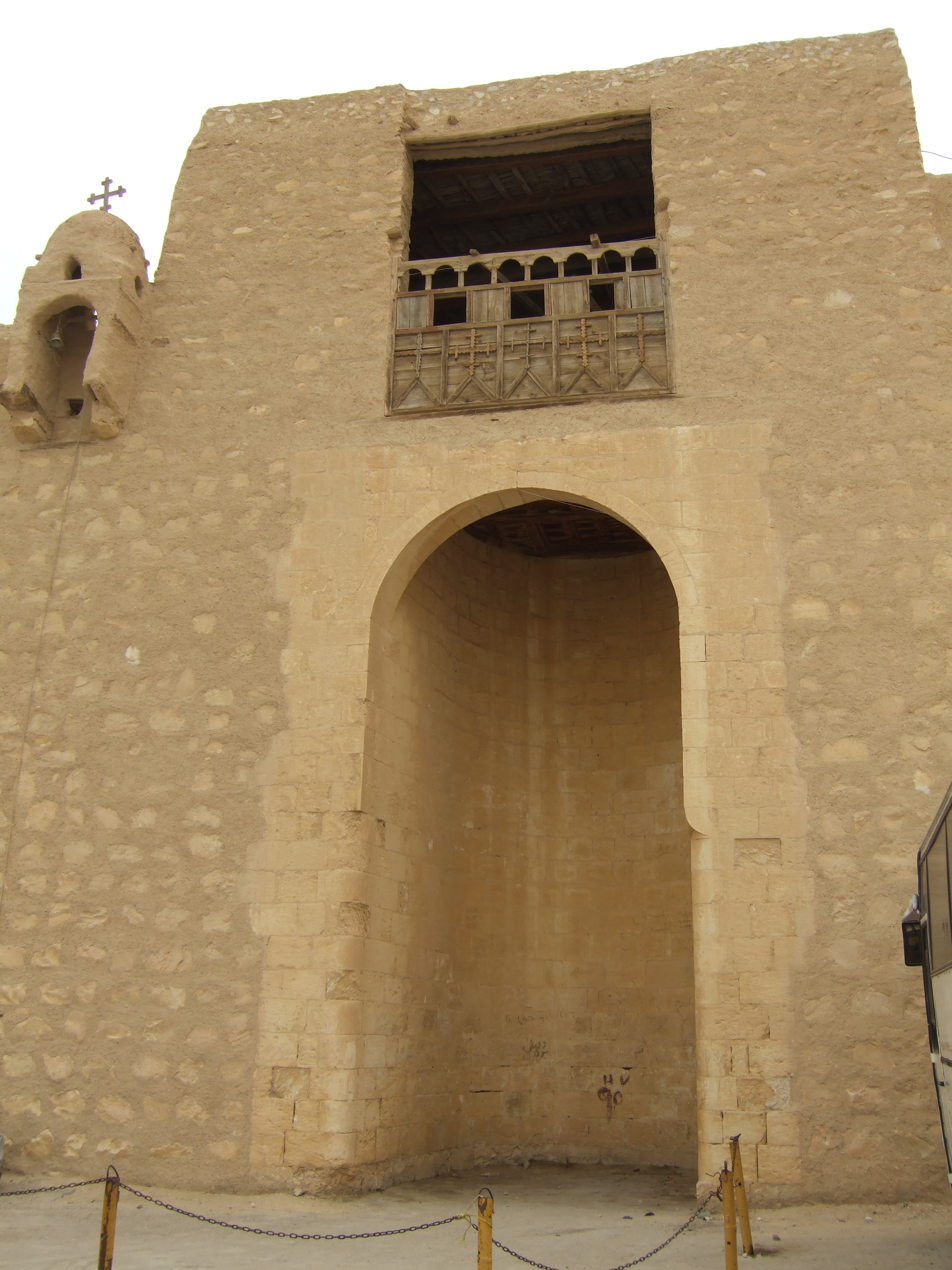

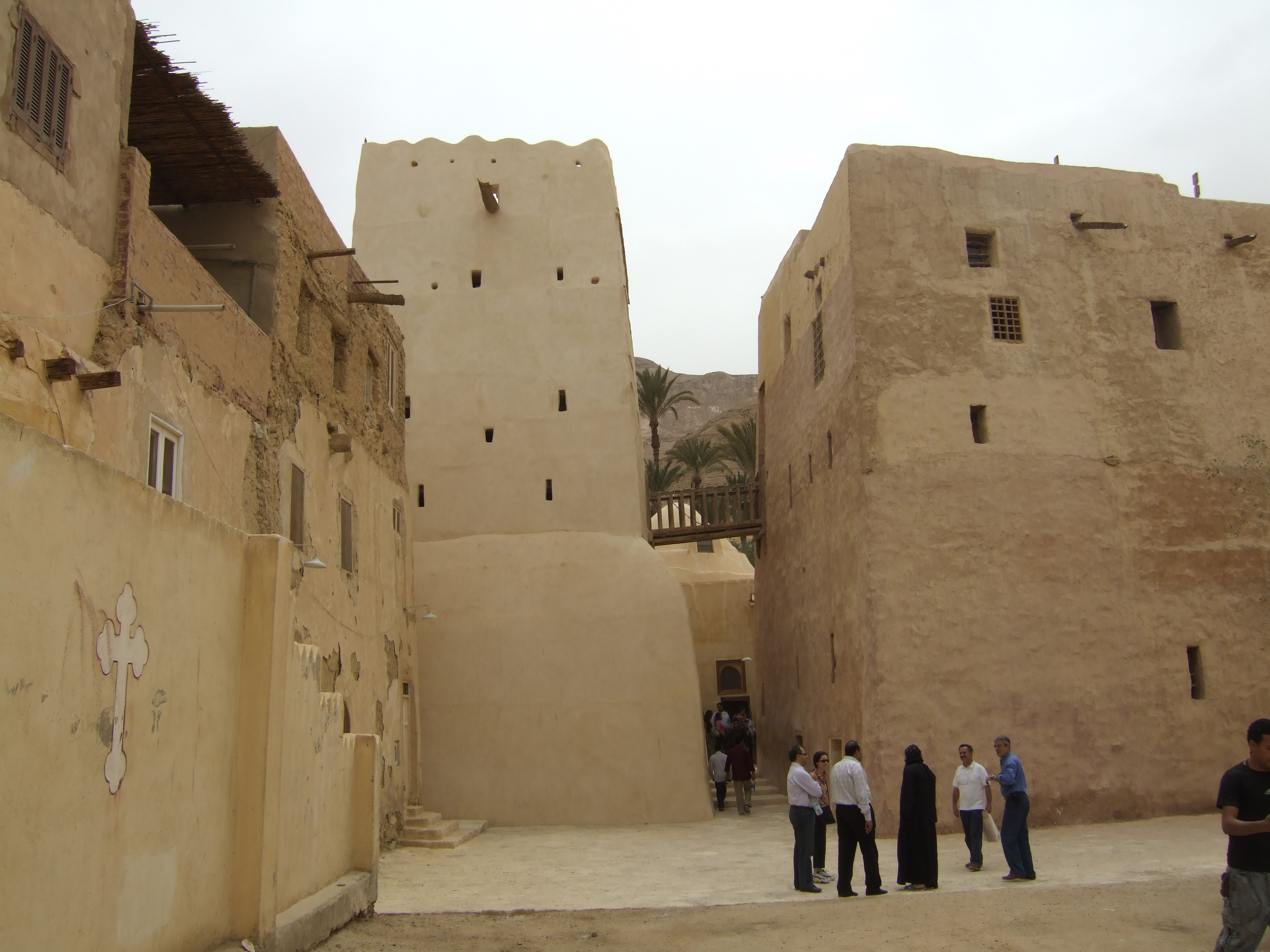

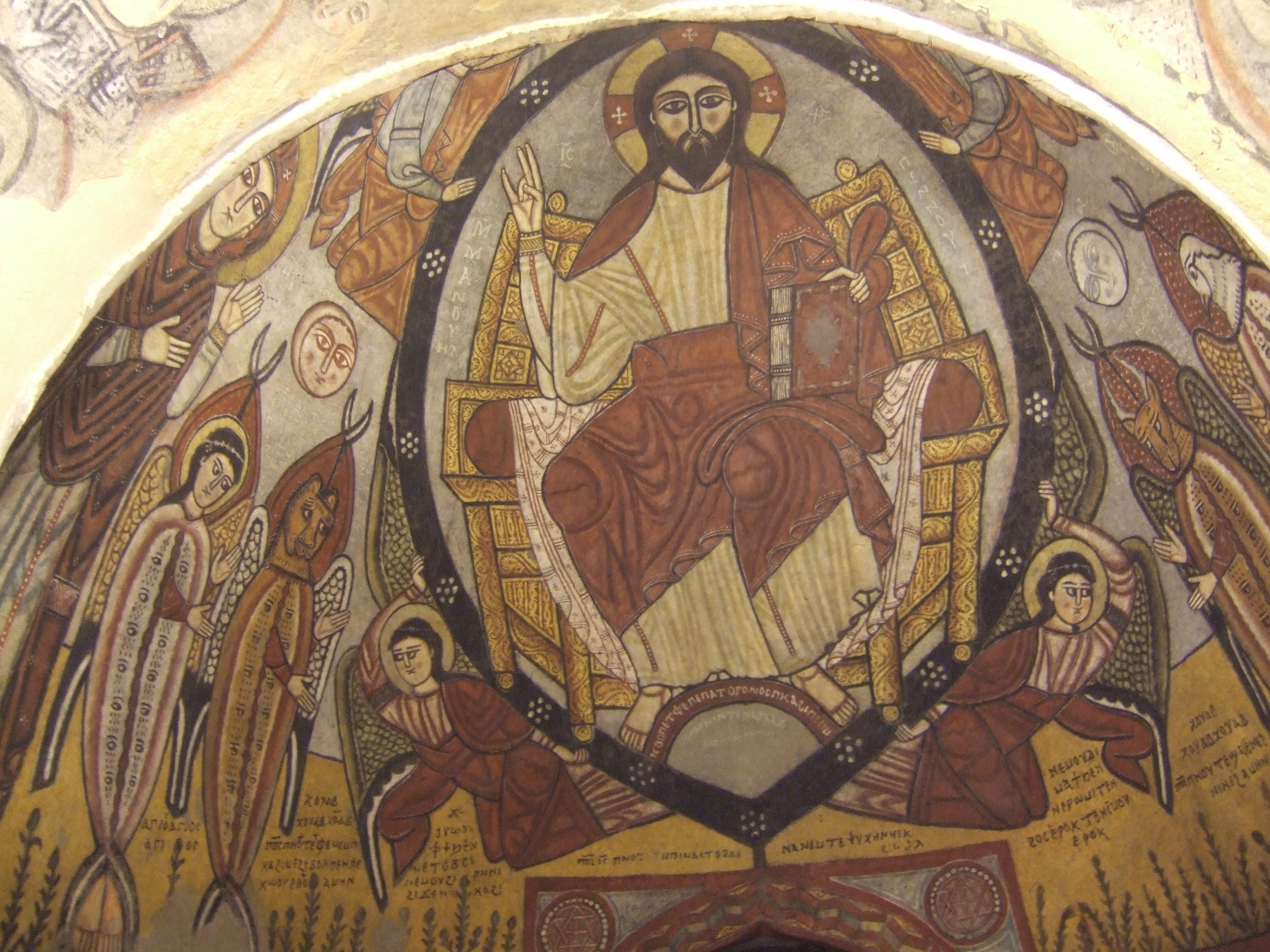

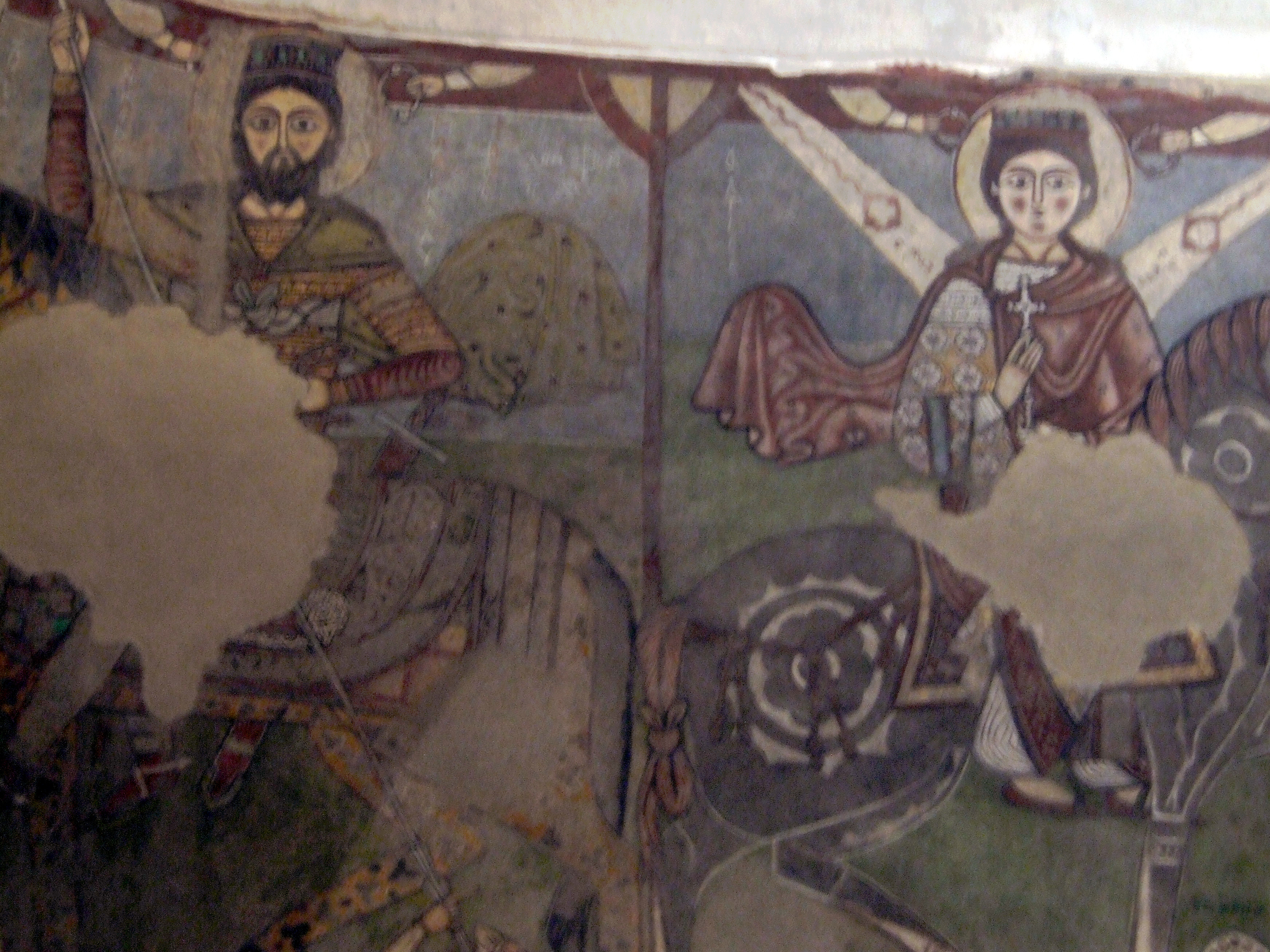

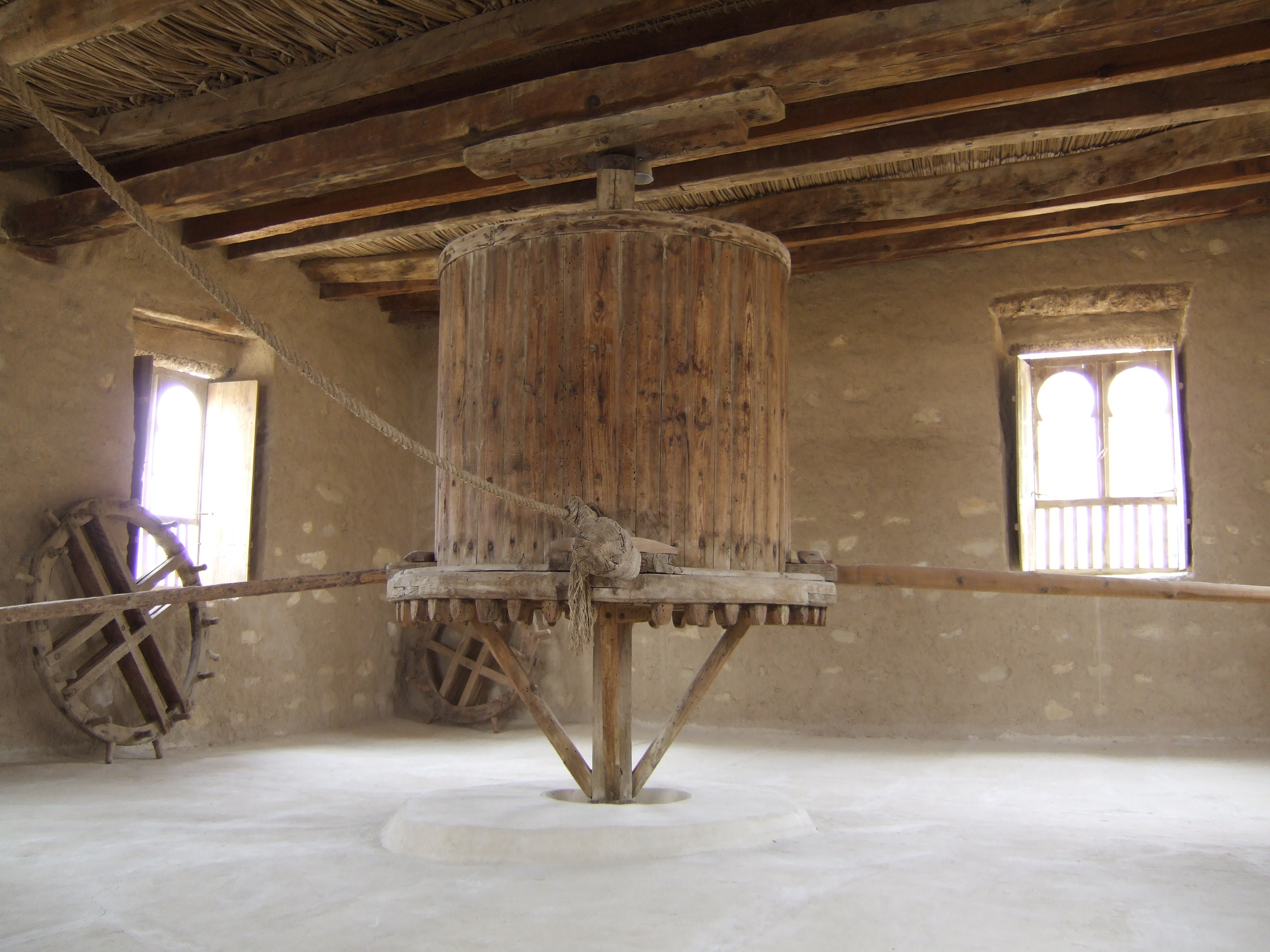

== See also ==
- The Temptation of St. Anthony (disambiguation)
- Coptic monasticism
- Coptic Orthodox Church
- Monastery of Saint Paul the Anchorite
- Oldest churches in the world
