= Galala =

Galala may refer to:

- Galala (dance)
- Galala marble
- Galala Mountain
