= John XVI =

John XVI may refer to:

- Antipope John XVI (c. 945-c. 1001), ruled in 997 to 998
- Pope John XVI of Alexandria (died 1718), ruled in 1676 to 1718

== See also ==
- John 16, the sixteenth chapter of the Gospel of John
