= Plateau =

Highland area, usually of relatively flat terrain

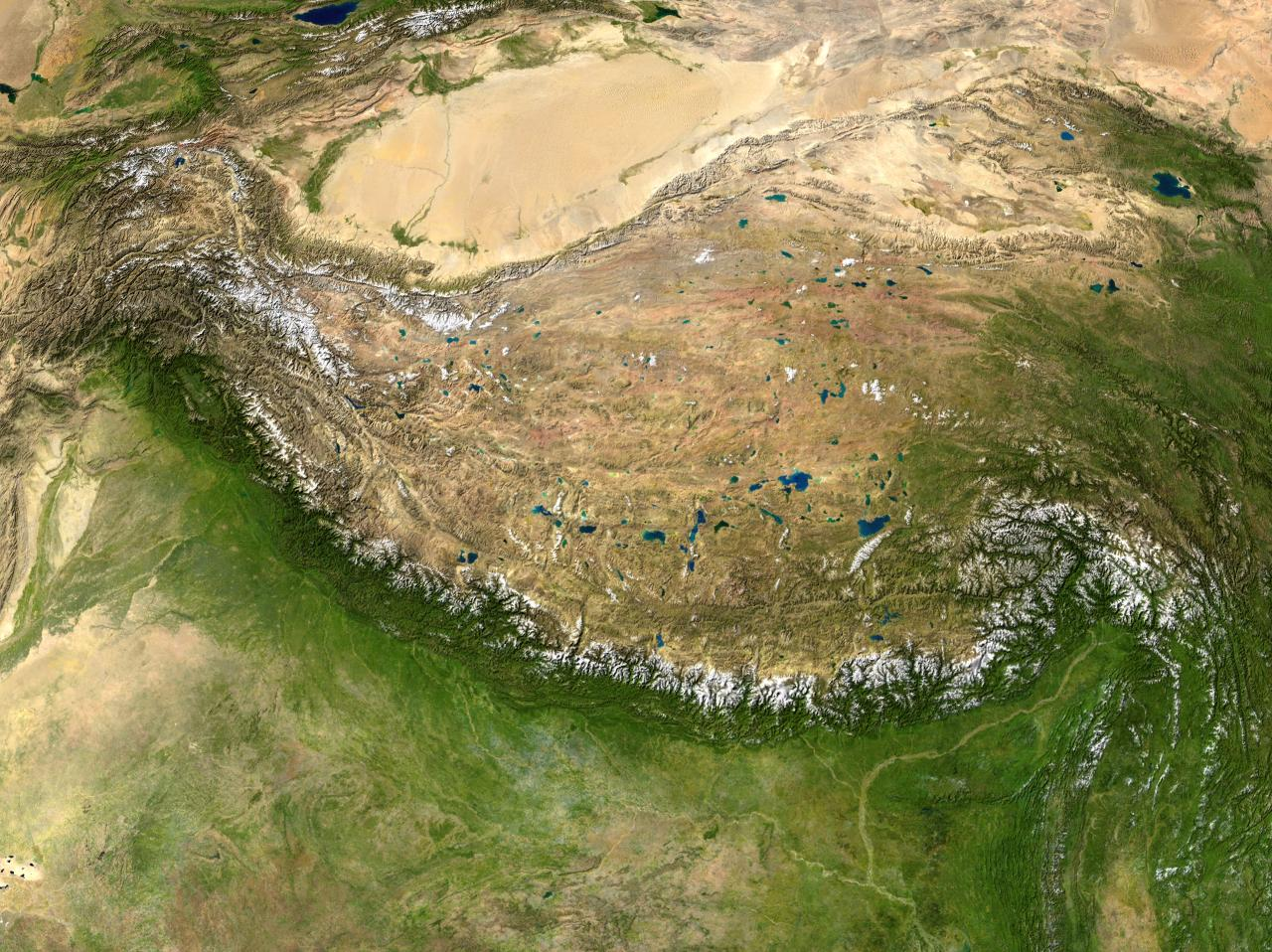
Satellite image of the Tibetan Plateau between the Himalayan mountains to the south and the Taklamakan Desert to the north

In geology and physical geography, a plateau (/pləˈtoʊ, plæˈtoʊ, ˈplætoʊ/; French: [plato]; pl.: plateaus or plateaux), also called a high plain or a tableland, is an area of highland consisting of flat terrain that is raised sharply above the surrounding area on at least one side. Often one or more sides have deep escarpments or hills. Plateaus can be formed by a number of processes, including upwelling of volcanic magma, extrusion of lava, and erosion by water and glaciers. Plateaus are classified according to their surrounding environment as intermontane, piedmont, or continental. A few plateaus may have a small flat top while others have wider ones.

== Formation ==
Plateaus can be formed by a number of processes, including upwelling of volcanic magma, extrusion of lava, plate tectonics movements, and erosion by water and glaciers.

=== Volcanic ===
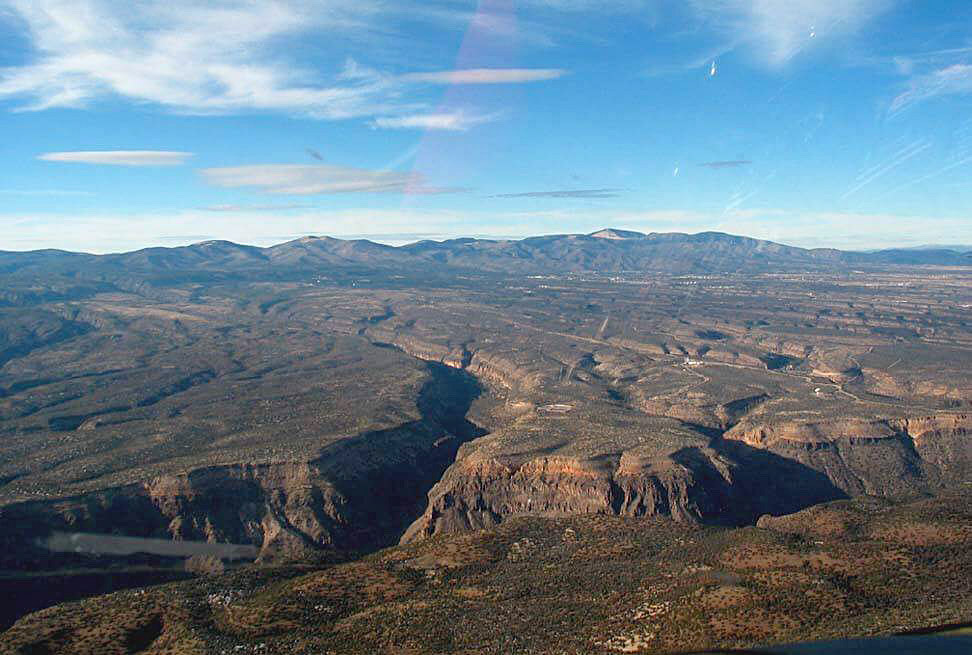
The Pajarito Plateau in New Mexico is an example of a volcanic plateau.

Volcanic plateaus are produced by volcanic activity. They may be formed by upwelling of volcanic magma or extrusion of lava. The underlining mechanism in forming plateaus from upwelling starts when magma rises from the mantle, causing the ground to swell upward. In this way, large, flat areas of rock are uplifted to form a plateau. For plateaus formed by extrusion, the rock is built up from lava spreading outward from cracks and weak areas in the crust. The Antrim Plateau in Northern Ireland, the Deccan Plateau in India, the Big Raven Plateau in Canada, and the Columbia Plateau in the United States are examples of lava plateaus.

=== Tectonic ===
Tectonic plateaus are formed by tectonic plate movements which cause uplift, and are normally of a considerable size, and a fairly uniform altitude. Examples are the Deccan Plateau in India and the Meseta Central on the Iberian Peninsula.

=== Erosion ===
Plateaus can also be formed by the erosional processes of glaciers on mountain ranges, leaving them sitting between the mountain ranges. Water can also erode mountains and other landforms down into plateaus. Dissected plateaus are highly eroded plateaus cut by rivers and broken by deep narrow valleys. An example is the Scottish Highlands.

== Classification ==
Plateaus are classified according to their surrounding environment.

- Intermontane plateaus are some of the highest and most extensive plateaus in the world, enclosed by fold mountains. Examples are the Tibetan Plateau between the Himalayas and Kunlun Mountains, and the Altiplano plateau between two ranges of the Andes.
- Piedmont plateaus are bordered on one side by mountains and on the other by a plain or a sea. The Piedmont Plateau of the Eastern United States between the Appalachian Mountains and the Atlantic Plain is an example.
- Continental plateaus are bordered on all sides by plains or oceans, forming away from the mountains. An example of a continental plateau is the Antarctic Plateau in East Antarctica.

== Large plateaus by continent ==
=== Africa ===
The highest African plateau is the Ethiopian Highlands which cover the central part of Ethiopia. It forms the largest continuous area of its altitude in the continent, with little of its surface falling below 1,500 metres (4,921 ft), while the summits reach heights of up to 4,556 metres (14,928 ft). It is sometimes called the Roof of Africa due to its height and large area.

Another example is the Highveld which is the portion of the South African inland plateau which has an altitude above approximately 1,500 metres, but below 2,100 metres, thus excluding the Lesotho mountain regions. It is home to some of the largest South African urban agglomerations.

In Egypt are the Giza Plateau and Galala Mountain, which was once called Gallayat Plateaus, rising 3,300 ft above sea level.

=== Antarctica ===
Another very large plateau is the icy Antarctic Plateau, which is sometimes referred to as the Polar Plateau or King Haakon VII Plateau, home to the geographic South Pole and the Amundsen–Scott South Pole Station, which covers most of East Antarctica where there are no known mountains but rather 3,000 m (9,800 ft) high of superficial ice and which spreads very slowly toward the surrounding coastline through enormous glaciers. The polar ice cap is so massive that the echolocation measurements of ice thickness have shown that large areas are below sea level. But, as the ice melts, the land beneath will rebound through isostasy and ultimately rise above sea level.

=== Asia ===
The largest and highest plateau in the world is the Tibetan Plateau, sometimes metaphorically described as the "Roof of the World", which is still being formed by the collisions of the Indo-Australian and Eurasian tectonic plates. The Tibetan Plateau covers approximately 2,500,000 km^{2} (970,000 sq mi), at about 5,000 m (16,000 ft) above sea level. The plateau is sufficiently high to reverse the Hadley cell convection cycles and to drive the monsoons of India towards the south. The Deosai Plains in Pakistan are situated at an average elevation of 4,114 meters (13,497 ft) above sea level. They are considered to be the second highest plateaus in the world.

Other major plateaus in Asia are: Najd on the Arabian Peninsula, elevation 762 to 1,525 m (2,500 to 5,003 ft), Armenian Highlands (≈400,000 km^{2} (150,000 sq mi), elevation 900–2,100 metres (3,000–6,900 ft)), Iranian Plateau (≈3,700,000 km^{2} (1,400,000 sq mi), elevation 300–1,500 metres (980–4,920 ft)), Anatolian Plateau, Mongolian Plateau (≈2,600,000 km^{2} (1,000,000 sq mi), elevation 1,000–1,500 metres (3,300–4,900 ft)), and the Deccan Plateau (≈1,900,000 km^{2} (730,000 sq mi), elevation 300–600 metres (980–1,970 ft)).

=== North America ===
A large plateau in North America is the Colorado Plateau, which covers about 337,000 km^{2} (130,000 sq mi) in Colorado, Arizona, New Mexico, and Utah.

In northern Arizona and southern Utah the Colorado Plateau is bisected by the Grand Canyon of the Colorado River. This came to be over 10 million years ago - the river was already there, though not necessarily on exactly the same course. Then, subterranean geological forces caused the land in that part of North America to gradually rise by about a centimeter per year for millions of years. An unusual balance occurred: the river that would become the Colorado River was able to erode into the crust of the Earth at a nearly equal rate to the uplift of the plateau. Now, millions of years later, the North Rim of the Grand Canyon is at an elevation of about 2,450 m (8,040 ft) above sea level, and the South Rim of the Grand Canyon is about 2,150 m (7,050 ft) above sea level. At its deepest, the Colorado River is about 1,830 m (6,000 ft) below the level of the North Rim.

Another high-altitude plateau in North America is the Mexican Plateau. With an area of 601,882 km^{2} (232,388 sq mi) and average height of 1,825 metres, it is the home of more than 70 million people.

=== Oceania ===
The Western Plateau, part of the Australian Shield, is an ancient craton covering much of the continent's southwest, an area of some 700,000 square kilometres. It has an average elevation between 305 and 460 metres.

The North Island Volcanic Plateau is an area of high land occupying much of the centre of the North Island of New Zealand, with volcanoes, lava plateaus, and crater lakes, the most notable of which is the country's largest lake, Lake Taupō. The plateau stretches approximately 100 km east to west and 130 km north to south. The majority of the plateau is more than 600 metres above sea level.

The Northern Tablelands are the largest highland area in Australia, covering approximately 18,197 square kilometres. There are widespread high points over 1,000 metres including The Brothers (1,508m), Ben Lomond (1,505m), Mount Rumbee (1,503m), Point Lookout (1,564m), Campoompeta (1,510m), Mount Spirabo (1,492m), Mount Mitchell (1,475m), Chandler's Peak (1,471m), Mount Grundy (1,462m), Mount Bajimba (1,448 m) and the highest point at Round Mountain is 1,584 metres above sea level. The now closed railway station at Ben Lomond, was the highest railway station in Australia. Apart from Antarctica it is the most extensive highland region in the Southern Hemisphere with an average elevation of over 1,000 metres.

=== South America ===
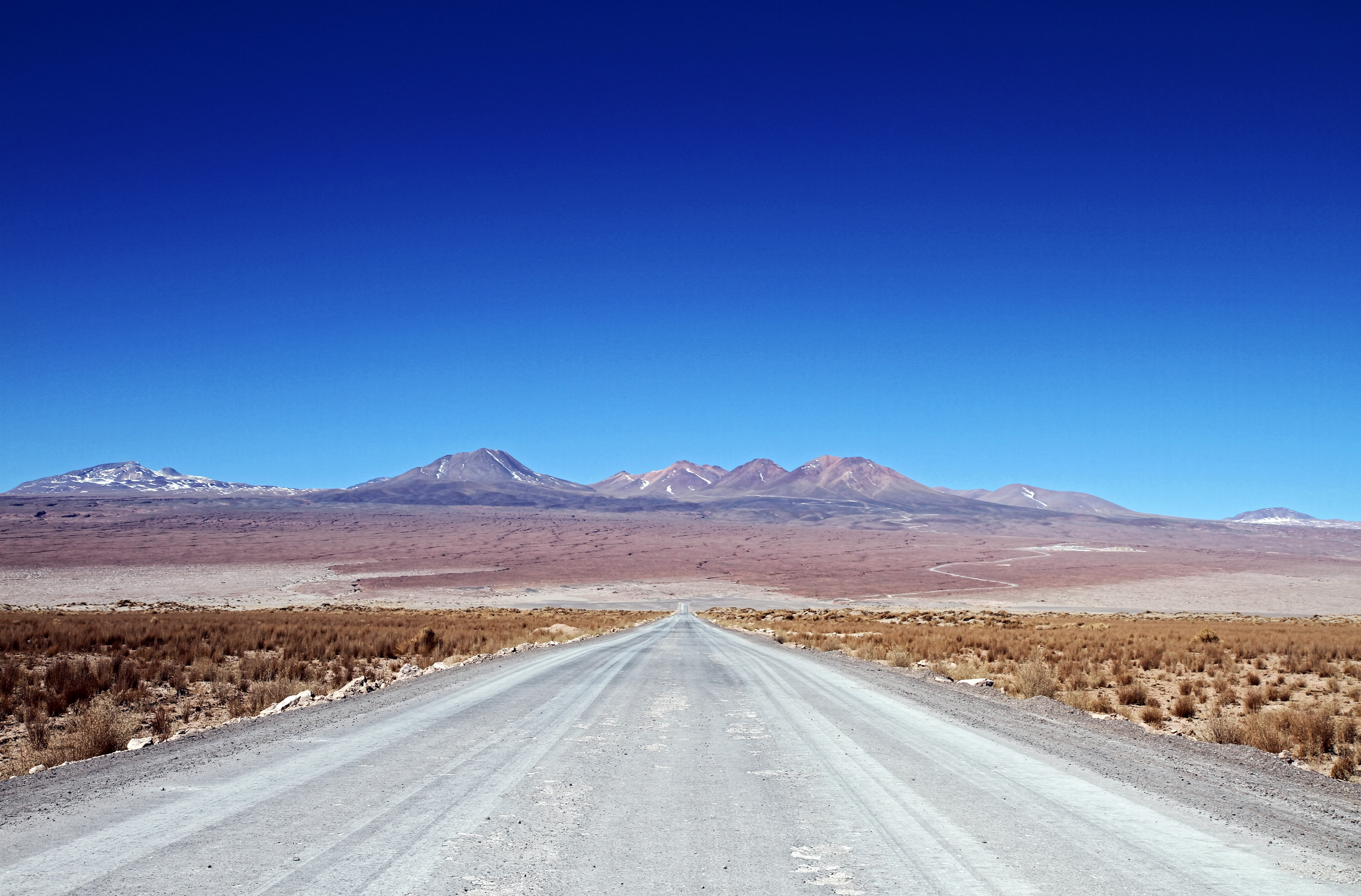
Road to the ALMA's Operations Support Facility and then on further to the Chajnantor Plateau at 5,000 metres above sea level.

The parallel Sierra of Andes delimit one of the world highest plateaux: the Altiplano, (Spanish for "high plain"), Andean Plateau or Bolivian Plateau. It lies in west-central South America, where the Andes are at their widest, is the most extensive area of high plateau on Earth outside of Tibet. The bulk of the Altiplano lies within Bolivian and Peruvian territory while its southern parts lie in Chile. The Altiplano plateau hosts several cities like Puno, Oruro, El Alto and La Paz the administrative seat of Bolivia. Northeastern Altiplano is more humid than the Southwestern, the latter of which hosts several salares, or salt flats, due to its aridity. At the Bolivia-Peru border lies Lake Titicaca, the largest lake in South America.

The Colombian capital city of Bogota sits on another Andean plateau known as the Altiplano Cundiboyacense roughly the size of Switzerland. Averaging a height of 2,600 m (8,500 ft) above sea level, this northern Andean plateau is situated in the country's eastern range and is divided into three main flat regions: the Bogotá savanna, the valleys of Ubaté and Chiquinquirá, and the valleys of Duitama and Sogamoso.

== See also ==
- Atherton Tableland – Fertile plateau in northern Queensland, Australia
- Butte – Isolated hill with steep, often vertical sides and a small, relatively flat top
- Chapada – Plateau in the Brazilian Highlands
- Deosai National Park – National park in Gilgit Baltistan, Pakistan
- Mesa – Elevated area of land with a flat top and sides, usually much wider than buttes
- Oceanic plateau – Relatively flat submarine region that rises well above the level of the ambient seabed
- Potrero – Long mesa that at one end slopes upward to higher terrain
- Tuya – Flat-topped, steep-sided volcano
