= Paremhat =

- Native name: Coptic: Ⲡⲁⲣⲉⲙϩⲁⲧ
- Calendar: Coptic calendar
- Month number: 7
- Number of days: 30
- Gregorian equivalent: March–April

Paremhat (Coptic: Ⲡⲁⲣⲉⲙϩⲁⲧ), also known as Phamenoth (Ancient Greek: Φαμενώθ, Phamenṓth) and Baramhat (Arabic: برمهات), is the seventh month of the ancient Egyptian and Coptic calendars. It lies between March 10 and April 8 of the Gregorian calendar.

Paremhat is also the third month of the Season of the Emergence, when the Nile floods recede and the crops start to grow throughout the land of Egypt.

== Name ==
The Coptic name Paremhat comes from the ancient Egyptian name "Month of Amenhotep I" (Ancient Egyptian: pꜣ n jmn-htp.w), who was deified at the end of his reign c. 1500 BC. The month had formerly been known as Rekeh-Nedjes.

== Coptic Synaxarium of the month of Paremhat ==
Coptic	Julian	Gregorian	Commemorations
Paremhat 1	February 25	March 10	Martyrdom of St. Alexandrus; Commemoration of St. Marcura, the Bishop; Departure of Narcissus of Jerusalem
Paremhat 2	February 26	March 11	Martyrdom of St. Macrobius (Makrawy), Bishop of Nikiû
Paremhat 3	February 27	March 12	Departure of Pope Cosmas III of Alexandria; Martyrdom of Saint Porphyrius; Departure of St. Hadid, the priest
Paremhat 4	February 28	March 13	Assembly of the Holy Council on the island of Bani Omar; Martyrdom of St. Haboulyous (Hanulius), the Prince of Perga
Paremhat 5	March 1	March 14	Departure of St. Serapamon, Archpriest of the Monastery of St. John the Dwarf; Martyrdom of Eudokia of Heliopolis.; Martyrdom of St. Peter, the priest.
Paremhat 6	March 2	March 15	Martyrdom of St. Dioscorus; Departure of St. Theodotus, Bishop of Corinth
Paremhat 7	March 3	March 16	Martyrdom of Sts. Philemon & St. Apollonius; Martyrdom of St. Mary, the Israelite
Paremhat 8	March 4	March 17	Martyrdom of Matthias the Apostle.; Martyrdom of St. Arianus, the Governor of Ansena.; Departure of Pope Julian of Alexandria; Departure of Fr. Faltaous El Souriani; Departure of Pope Shenouda III of Alexandria.
Paremhat 9	March 5	March 18	Departure of St. Konan the Syrian; Martyrdom of Sts. Abrianus, Amrata his wife, Eusebius, Armanius, and the Forty Martyrs.
Paremhat 10	March 6	March 19	Commemoration of the Appearance of the Glorious Cross
Paremhat 11	March 7	March 20	Martyrdom of St. Basilaos, the Bishop
Paremhat 12	March 8	March 21	Commemoration of Michael, the Archangel; Commemoration of the revealing of the Virginity of Pope Demetrius I of Alexandria.; Martyrdom of St. Malachias of Palestine; Martyrdom of St. Glathinos in Damascus; Departure of Bishoy Kamel
Paremhat 13	March 9	March 22	Departure of Pope Dionysius of Alexandria.; Return of Macarius of Egypt & Macarius of Alexandria from exile.; Martyrdom of the Forty Martyrs of Sebaste
Paremhat 14	March 10	March 23	Departure of St. Cyril III, the 75th Pope of Alexandria.; Martyrdom of St. Sinouti el-Bahnasa; Martyrdom of the Sts. Eugenius, Agathodorus and Elpidius
Paremhat 15	March 11	March 24	Departure of St. Sarah the nun; Martyrdom of St. Helias of Hnes
Paremhat 16	March 12	March 25	Departure of Pope Michael I of Alexandria.
Paremhat 17	March 13	March 26	Departure of Lazarus of Bethany, the beloved of the Lord.; Commemoration of St. George the Ascetic, St. Belasius the Martyr, & St. Joseph the Bishop; Departure of St. Basilius, Bishop of Jerusalem; Martyrdom of Sidhom Bishay in Damietta.
Paremhat 18	March 14	March 27	Martyrdom of St. Isidore, friend of St. Sina the Soldier
Paremhat 19	March 15	March 28	Martyrdom of Aristobulus of Britannia.; Martyrdom of the Sts. Alexander, Agabius, Alexander, Timolaos, Dionysius, Romulus, and Blesius (Valesius)
Paremhat 20	March 16	March 29	Raising of Lazarus of Bethany from the dead.; Departure of Pope Michael III of Alexandria.
Paremhat 21	March 17	March 30	Commemoration of the Mary, mother of Jesus, the Mother of God (Theotokos).; Commemoration of the visit of Jesus to Bethany.; Consultation of the Chief Priests to put the righteous Lazarus to death
Paremhat 22	March 18	March 31	Departure of St. Michael, Bishop of Naqada; Departure of Cyril of Jerusalem.
Paremhat 23	March 19	April 1	Departure of Daniel, the Prophet.
Paremhat 24	March 20	April 2	Apparition of Our Lady of Zeitoun.; Departure of Pope Macarius I of Alexandria.
Paremhat 25	March 21	April 3	Departure of St. Onesiphorous (Friska), one of the Seventy Apostles; Departure of Pope Matthew III of Alexandria.
Paremhat 26	March 22	April 4	Departure of Euphrasia of Constantinople.; Departure of Pope Peter VI of Alexandria.
Paremhat 27	March 23	April 5	Crucifixion of Our Lord Jesus Christ; Departure of Macarius of Egypt.; Martyrdom of St. Domicos
Paremhat 28	March 24	April 6	Departure of the Righteous Emperor Constantine the Great; Departure of Pope Peter VII of Alexandria; Commemoration of St. Sarapamon, known as “The Veiled,” Bishop of El-Monufia
Paremhat 29	March 25	April 7	Commemoration of the Life-giving Annunciation; Resurrection of Our Lord Christ from the dead
Paremhat 30	March 26	April 8	Commemoration of Gabriel, the Announcer; Commemoration of the transfer of the relics of James Intercisus; Commemoration of Samson, one of the Hebrew Bible judges
