= Pope Mark VII of Alexandria =

Head of the Coptic Church from 1745 to 1769

- Pope of Alexandria & Patriarch of the See of St. Mark
- Papacy began: 30 May 1745
- Papacy ended: 18 May 1769
- Predecessor: John XVII
- Successor: John XVIII

Personal details
- Born: Simeon Klosna, in the district of El Bahnasa, Egypt
- Died: 18 May 1769 Egypt
- Buried: Saint Mercurius Church in Coptic Cairo
- Denomination: Coptic Orthodox Christian
- Residence: Saint Mary Church (Haret Elroum)

Pope Mark VII of Alexandria (Abba Marcos VII), 106th Pope of Alexandria & Patriarch of the See of St. Mark. Pope Mark VII was born in the village of Qulusna (Qulusana, Kalusna, Klosna), in the district of Samalut, near El Bahnasa, and his lay name was Simeon (Sam‘an). He joined the Monastery of Saint Anthony at a young age, then moved to the Monastery of Saint Paul the Anchorite, where he became a monk and was ordained a priest. When Pope John XVII departed, he was chosen to succeed him. Pope Mark VII was ordained Pope and Patriarch of Alexandria on Sunday, 24 Pashons, 1461 A.M. (30 May 1745 AD) on the day of the feast of the entry of Christ to Egypt.

Pope Mark VII was contemporary of the Ottoman Sultans Mahmud I, Osman III, and Mustafa III.

He ordained a general bishop over Upper Egypt to shepherd its Christians. He also ordained HG John (Yoannis) the 14th as the 104th Metropolitan of Ethiopia.

Pope Mark VII occupied the Throne of Saint Mark for 23 years, 11 months, and 18 days. He departed on 12 Pashons 1485 A.M. (18 May 1769 AD), while he was residing in a monastery in Maadi. He was buried in the tombs of the Patriarchs at Saint Mercurius Church in Coptic Cairo. The Papal Throne was vacant after his departure for 5 months and 5 days.

== Sources ==
- Coptic Synexarion

Oriental Orthodox titles
Preceded by John XVII	Coptic Pope; 1745–1769	Succeeded by John XVIII
