= Peter VII =

Peter VII may refer to:

- Pope Peter VII of Alexandria (died 1852)
- Patriarch Peter VII of Alexandria (1949–2004)
