= Paul of Thebes =

Egyptian saint, generally regarded as the first Christian hermit

Saint Paul of Thebes
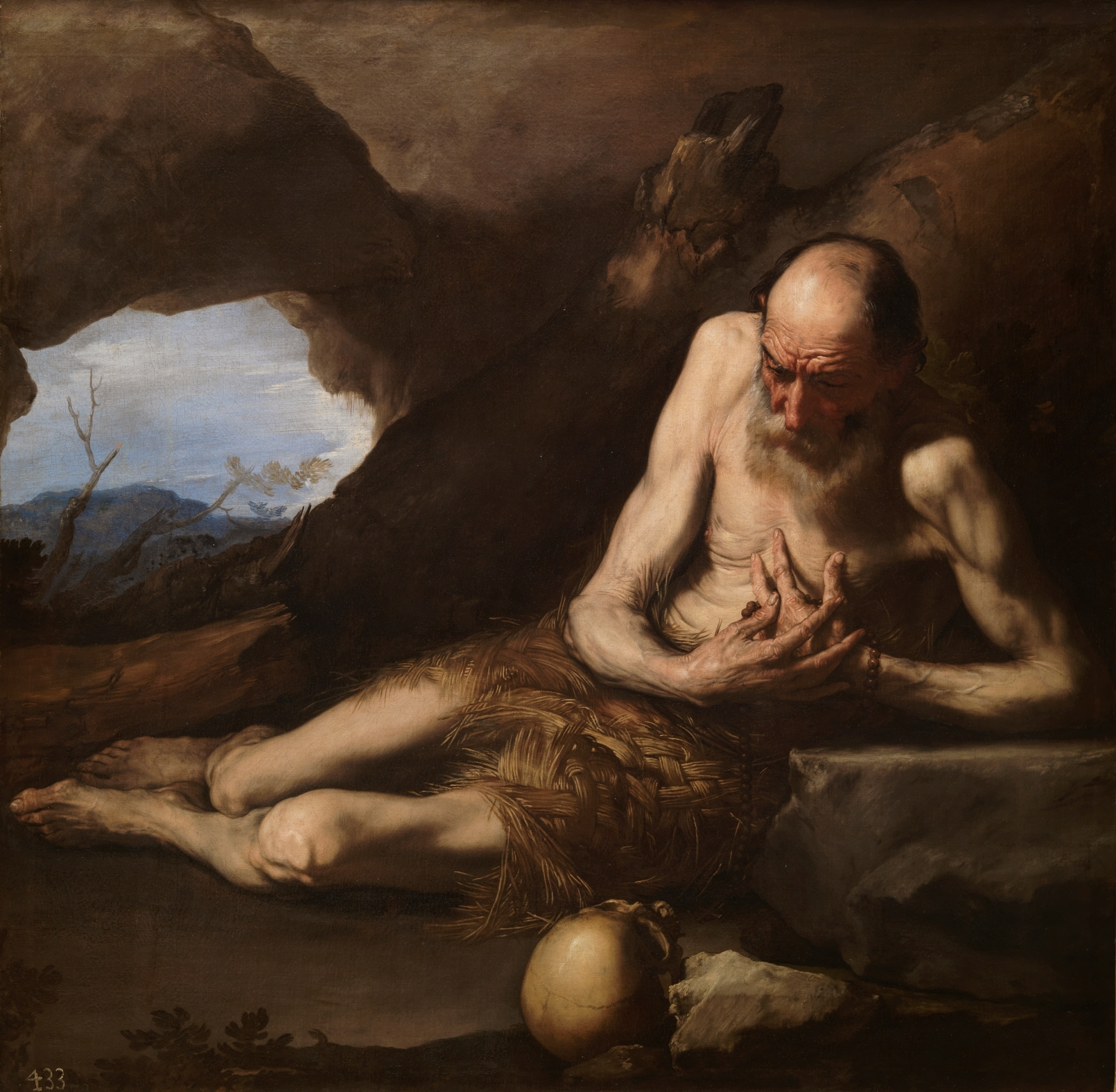
- Saint Paul, "The First Hermit", Jusepe de Ribera, Museo del Prado (1640)

Desert Father The First Hermit
- Born: c. 227 AD; Thebaid, Roman Egypt
- Died: c. 341 AD; Thebes, Roman Egypt
- Venerated in: Catholic Church; Eastern Orthodox Church; Oriental Orthodox Church; Anglican Communion
- Canonized: 491 by Pope Gelasius I
- Major shrine: Monastery of Saint Paul the Anchorite, Egypt
- Feast: 10 January/15 January (Catholic Church); 15 January (Eastern Orthodox Church); 9 February (Coptic Orthodox Church)
- Attributes: Two lions, palm tree, raven

Paul of Thebes (Coptic: Ⲁⲃⲃⲁ Ⲡⲁⲩⲗⲉ; Koine Greek: Παῦλος ὁ Θηβαῖος, Paûlos ho Thēbaîos; Latin: Paulus Eremita; c. 227 – c. 341), commonly known as Paul the First Hermit or Paul the Anchorite, was an Egyptian saint regarded as the first Christian hermit and grazer, who was claimed to have lived alone in the desert of Thebes in Roman Egypt from the age of 16 to the age of 113 years old. He was canonized in 491 by Pope Gelasius I, and is venerated as a saint by the Catholic Church, Eastern Orthodox Church, and Oriental Orthodox Churches.

== Legend ==
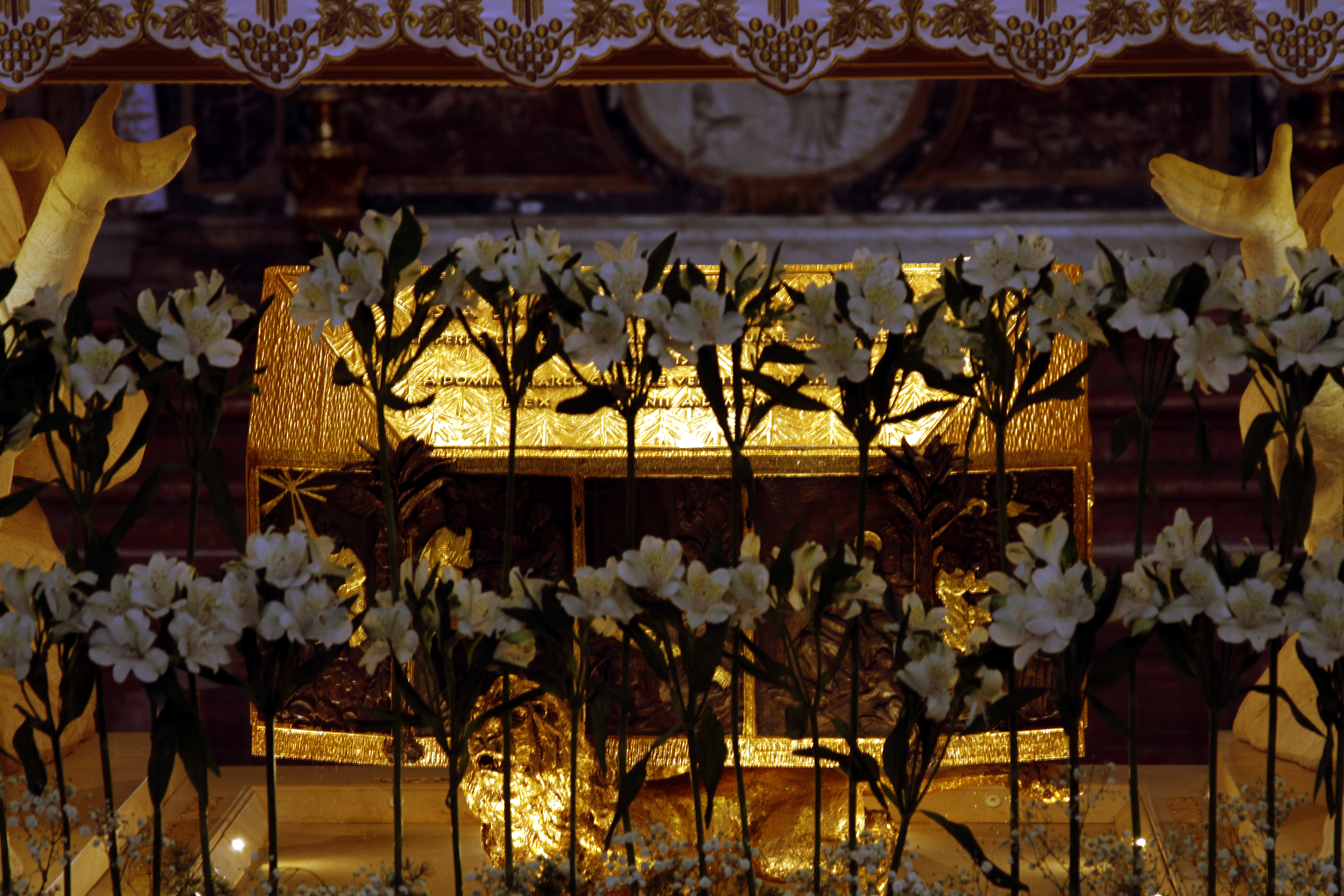
Relics of Paul of Thebes preserved in the Roman Catholic basilica Santa Maria in Porto, Ravenna.

The Life of Saint Paul the First Hermit was written in Latin by Jerome, probably in 375–376.

Paul of Thebes was born around 227 in the Thebaid of Egypt. Paul and his married sister lost their parents. In order to obtain Paul's inheritance, his brother-in-law sought to betray him to the persecutors. According to Jerome's Vitae Patrum (Vita Pauli primi eremitae), Paul fled to the Theban desert as a young man during the persecution of Decius and Valerianus around AD 250.

He lived in the mountains of this desert in a cave near a clear spring and a palm tree, the leaves of which provided him with clothing and the fruit of which provided him with his only source of food until he was 43 years old, when a raven started bringing him half a loaf of bread daily. He would remain in that cave for the rest of his life, almost a hundred years.

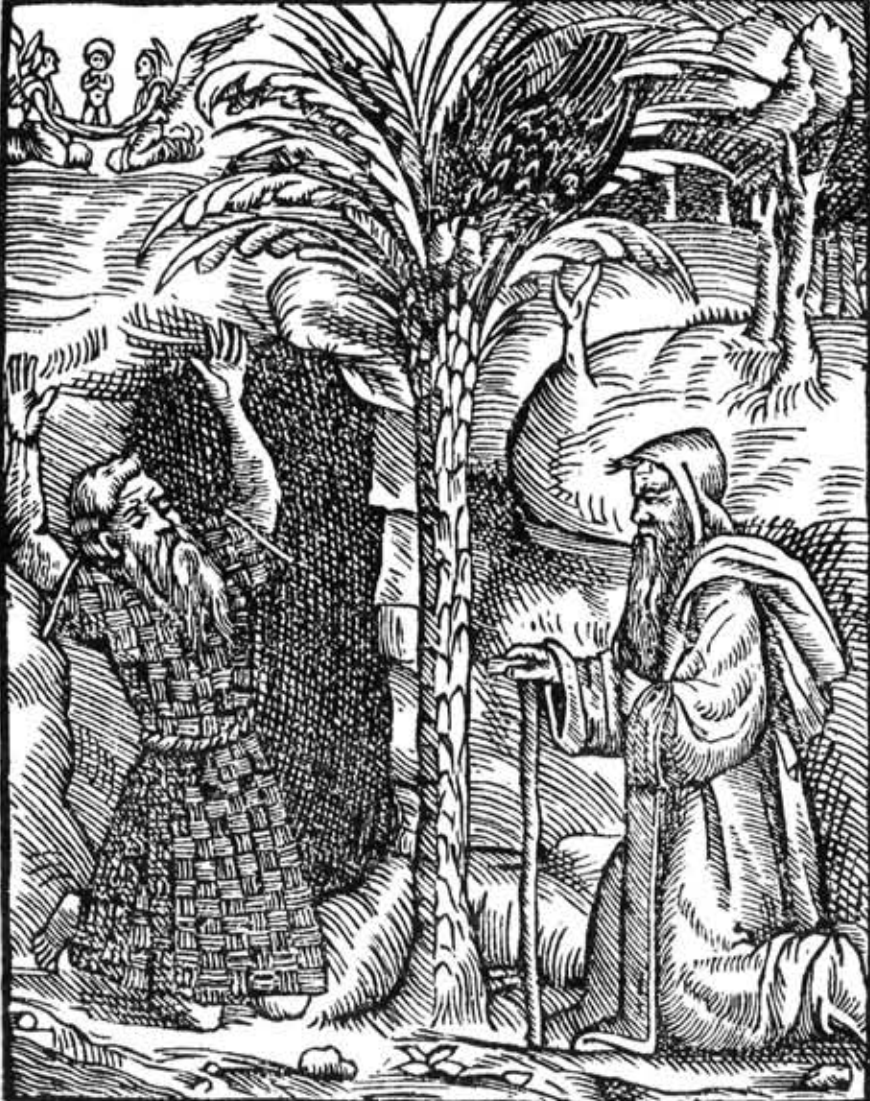
Anthony the Great visits Paul of Thebes; illustration from the Breviarium ordinis fratrum eremitarum Sancti Pauli primi eremite, Velence, 1540.

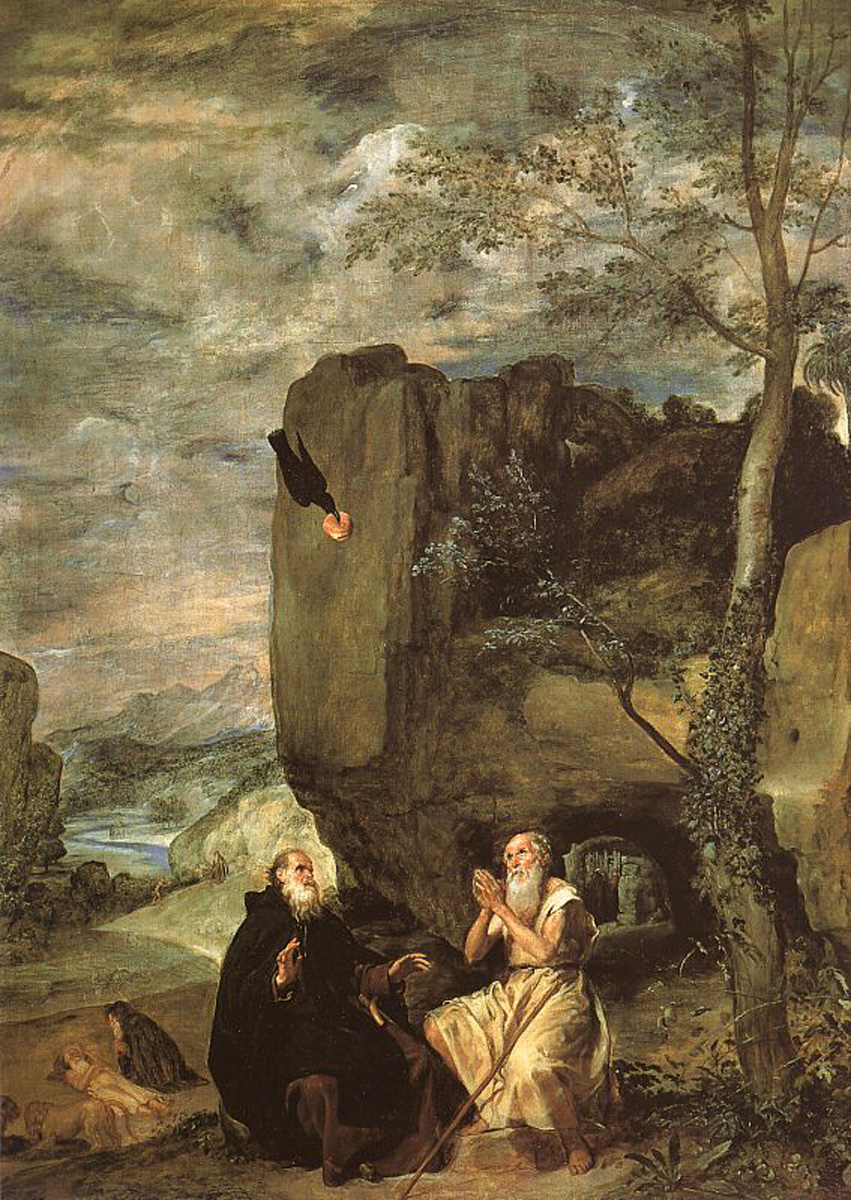
Saint Anthony the Great and Saint Paul the Anchorite, Diego Velázquez, circa 1634

Paul of Thebes is known to posterity because around the year 342, Anthony the Great was told in a dream about the older hermit's existence, and went to find him.

Jerome related that Anthony the Great and Paul met when the latter was aged 113. They conversed with each other for one day and one night. The Synaxarium shows each saint inviting the other to bless and break the bread, as a token of honor. Paul held one side, putting the other side into the hands of Father Anthony, and soon the bread broke through the middle and each took his part. When Anthony next visited him, Paul was dead. Anthony clothed him in a tunic which was a present from Athanasius of Alexandria and buried him, with two lions helping to dig the grave. Father Anthony returned to his monastery taking with him the robe from Athanasius, woven with palm leaf. He honored the robe so much that he only wore it twice a year: at the Feast of Easter, and at the Pentecost.

== Veneration ==
His feast day is 15 January in the liturgical calendar of the Extraordinary Form of the Catholic Church. (Note: "In Thebais, the birthday of St. Paul, the first hermit, who lived alone in the desert from the age of sixteen to the age of one hundred thirteen. ...His feast is celebrated on the 15th of this month.") Following the reform of the calendar, the feast is now listed as 10 January in the 2004 edition of the Roman Martyrology. The Eastern Orthodox Churches celebrate his feast day on January 15, and on 2 Meshir (9 February) in the Coptic Orthodox Church. Anthony described him as "the first monk".

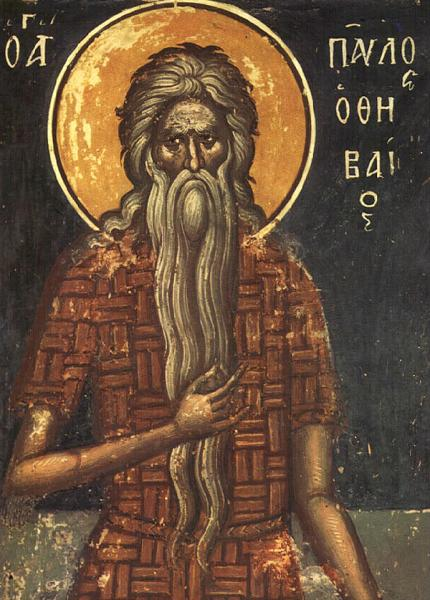
Fresco of Paul of Thebes from Stavronikita

The Monastery of Saint Paul the Anchorite (Deir Anba Bola) is traditionally believed by Copts to be on the site of the cave where Paul lived and where his remains are kept. The monastery is located in the eastern desert mountains of Egypt near the Red Sea. The Cave Church of Saint Paul marks the spot where Anthony and Paul are believed to have met.

The Order of Saint Paul the First Hermit was founded in Hungary in his honour in the 13th century. He is usually represented with a palm tree, two lions, and a raven. He is also the patron saint of the Roman Catholic Diocese of San Pablo and titular of the Cathedral of the said Diocese in San Pablo, Laguna, Philippines.

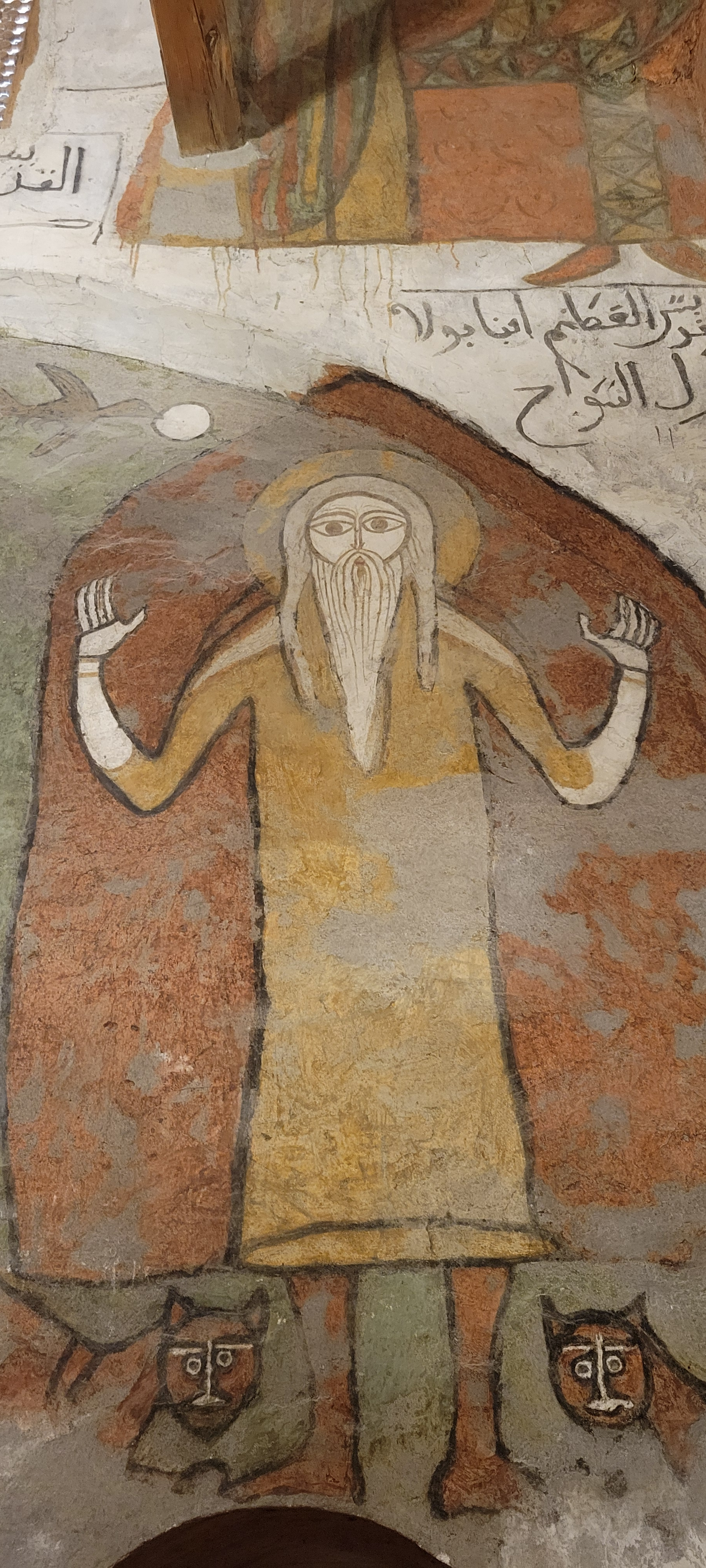
Fresco of St.Paul the Anchorite in the Monastery of St.Paul the Anchorite in Egypt

== See also ==
- Coptic Orthodox Church
- Hermit
- Monastery of Saint Paul the Anchorite

== Sources ==
- Oxford Dictionary of Saints, ed D. H. Farmer. OUP 2004.
- Attwater, Donald and Catherine Rachel John. The Penguin Dictionary of Saints. 3rd edition. New York: Penguin Books, 1993. ISBN 0-14-051312-4.
