= Monastery of Saint Paul the Anchorite =

Coptic monastery in Egypt

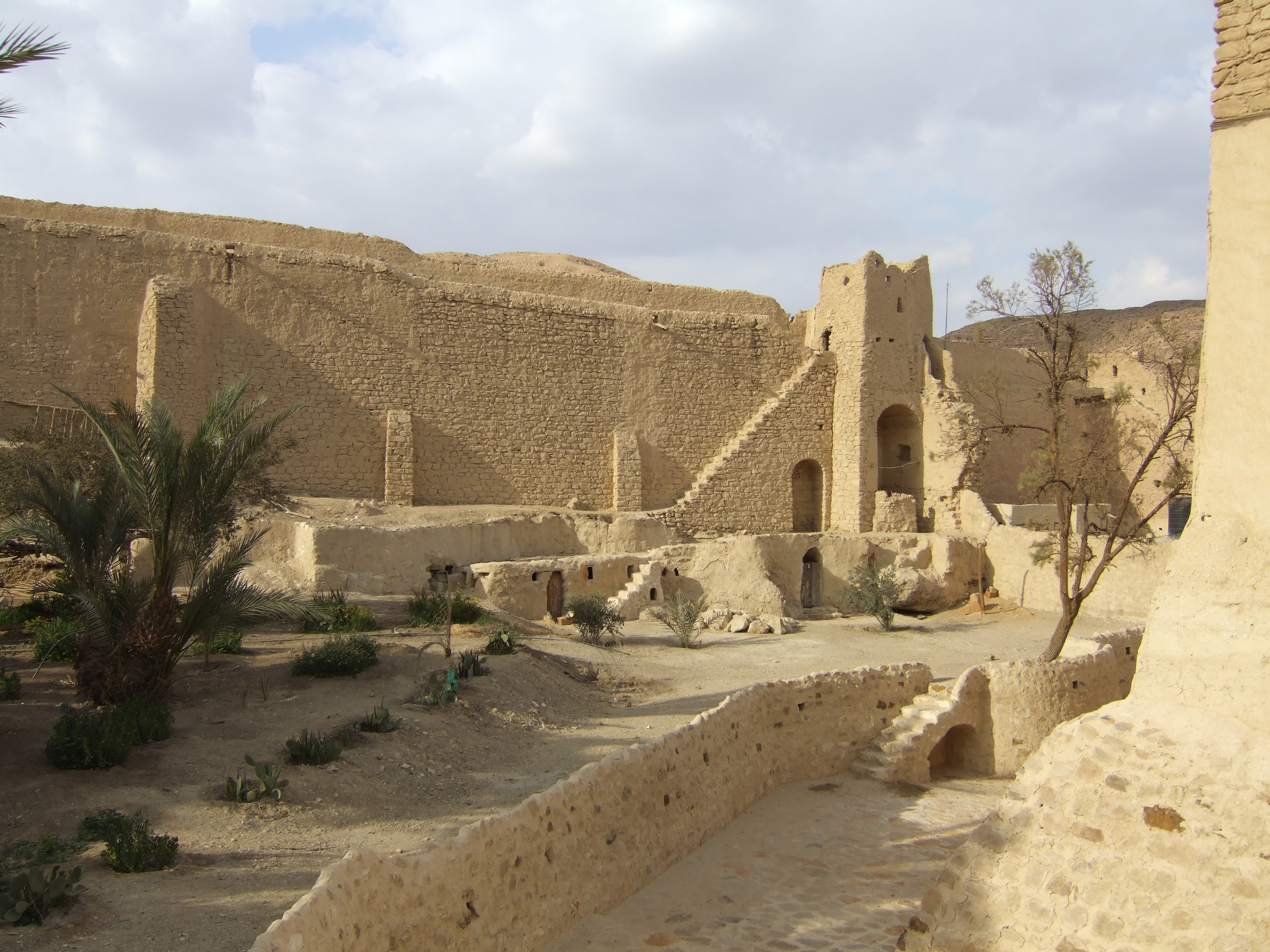

- Location within Egypt
- Interactive map of Monastery of Saint Paul the Anchorite

Monastery information
- Other name: Deir Anba Bola(Boula)
- Established: 4th century
- Dedication: Saint Paul the Anchorite
- Diocese: Coptic Orthodox Church of Alexandria

Site
- Location: Red Sea Governorate
- Country: Egypt
- Coordinates: 28.846667°N 32.551667°E
- Public access: Yes

The Monastery of Saint Paul the Anchorite in Egypt is a Coptic Orthodox monastery located in the Eastern Desert, near the Red Sea Mountains. It is about 405 km (252 mi) south east of Cairo. The monastery is also known as the Monastery of the Tigers.

== Foundation and history ==
The Monastery of Saint Paul the Anchorite dates to the fourth century AD. It was founded over the cave where Paul lived for more than eighty years. The first travel narrative of the monastery was provided by Antoninus Martyr, a native of Placentia, who visited the tomb of Paul the Anchorite between the years 560 and 570 AD. The first monks to occupy the monastery were some of the disciples of Anthony the Great after they knew the story of Paul the Anchorite it might have been occupied by Melkites for a short period, but they were followed by Egyptian again and Syrian monks. The Syrians may have had a sustained existence at the monastery, for it appears that they also occupied the monastery during the first half of the fifteenth century, after which their presence disappeared. According to an isolated Ethiopian reference, the 70th Coptic Orthodox Pope, Gabriel II (1131–45 AD), was banished to the monastery of Saint Paul the Anchorite for three years.

Like most of Egypt's monasteries, this one suffered repeatedly at the hands of Bedouin tribes. The most destructive of their raids was in 1484 AD, when many of the monastery's monks were killed and the library was put to the torch. The monastery was later rebuilt under the patronage of Pope Gabriel VII of Alexandria (1526–69 AD), who sent ten monks from the Syrian Monastery to populate the monastery of Saint Paul the Anchorite. During the second half of the sixteenth century, the monastery was again attacked and ransacked twice by the Bedouins, forcing the monks to finally leave. The monastery remained deserted for the following 119 years, only to be repopulated by a group of monks from the Monastery of Saint Anthony under the patronage of Pope John XVI of Alexandria (1676–1718 AD), who promoted an extensive reconstruction of the monastery in 1701 AD.

== Modern history ==
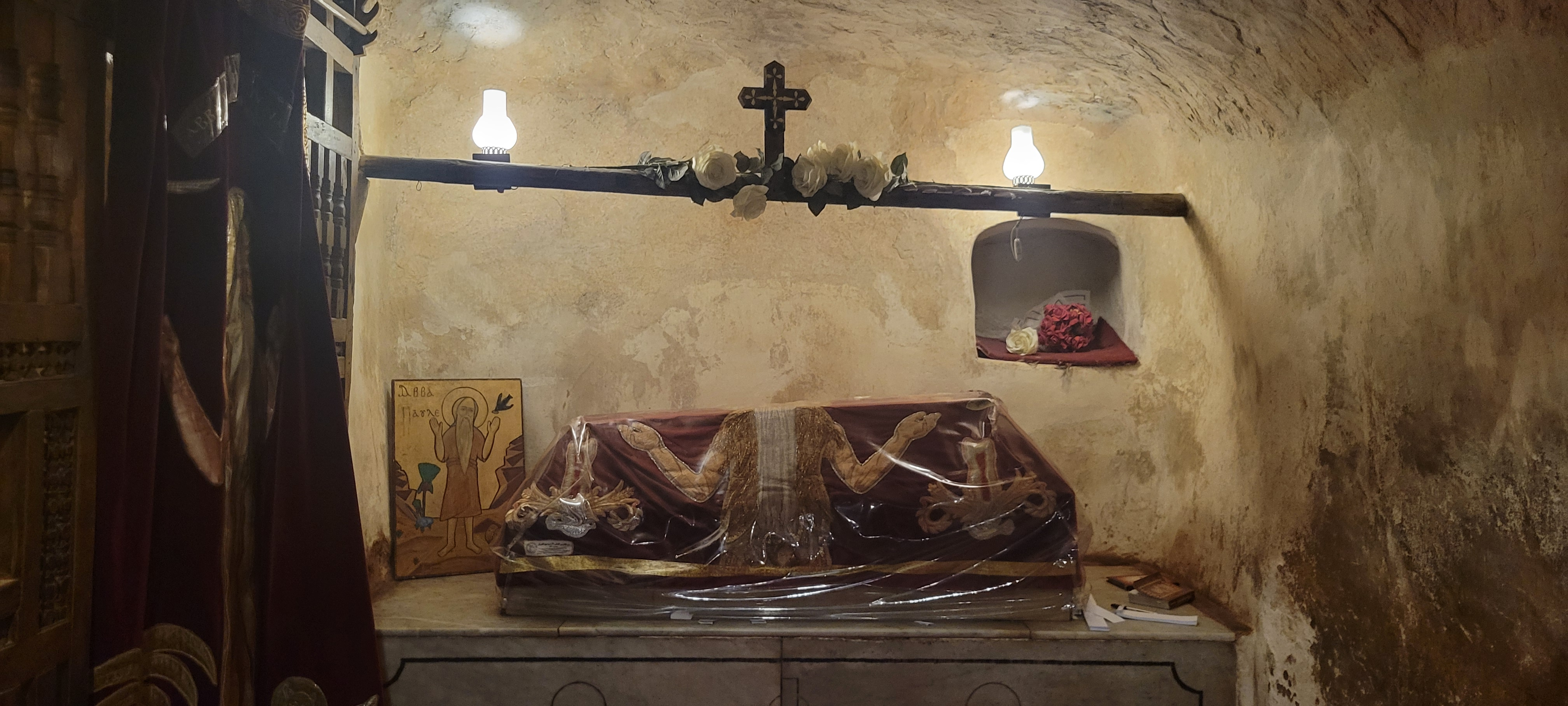
The Relic body of St.Paul the Anchorite in the monastery.

The modern monastery has three different churches. That of Saint Paul the Anchorite, built underground, was originally dug into the cave where the saint lived and where his remains are kept. The two other churches are named after Saint Mercurius and Archangel Michael. The monastery is surrounded by high walls, built during the eighteenth and nineteenth centuries. It also has a tower (keep), an ancient refectory, a mill, and a spring that is believed to have served Saint Paul the Anchorite during his eighty years of seclusion in this area. A second spring, known as the Pool of Mary is named after Mary, the sister of Moses, who is believed to have washed her feet there during the Exodus. This monastery has many illustrated manuscripts, including the Coptic version of the Divine Liturgy and the Commentary of the Epistle to Titus by Saint John Chrysostom.

As of the 2010s, there were still anchorite hermits living in the desert near the monastery as reported by a Danish documentary film.

== Popes from the Monastery of St. Paul the Anchorite ==
1. Pope John XVII (1727-1745)

== Abbot ==
Bishop Daniel, Abbot of the Monastery of Saint Paul, was born in 1959. He was consecrated a monk at the Monastery of Saint Paul in 1983 and then ordained priest in 1985. In 1997 Fr. Daniel was elevated to hegumen and appointed deputy of the monastery. He was ordained bishop and abbot of the monastery in 2006 by Pope Shenouda III.

The late Bishop Agathon, previous abbot of the Monastery of Saint Paul, was born in 1922. He was consecrated a monk at the Monastery of the Virgin Mary – El Sorian in 1958. Fr. Agathon was ordained priest in 1963 and elevated to hegumen in 1965. In 1972 he was ordained bishop by Pope Shenouda III and then appointed abbot of the Monastery of Saint Paul in 1974. He was elevated to the rank of metropolitan in 1991 and died in 1999.

== See also ==
- Coptic Orthodox Church
- Monastery of Saint Anthony
- Saint Paul the Anchorite
