= Sidhom Bishay =

19th-century Coptic martyr and saint

Saint Sidhom Bishay
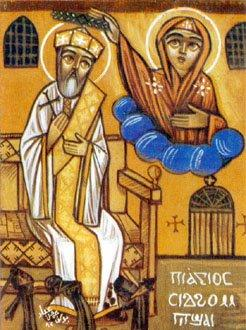

Martyr
- Born: 19th century Damietta, Egypt
- Died: 25 March 1844; Damietta, Egypt
- Venerated in: Coptic Orthodox Church
- Major shrine: St. Mary Coptic Orthodox Church (Damietta, Mokattam)
- Feast: 17 Paremhat

Sidhom Bishay (Coptic: ⲥⲓⲇϩⲟⲙ ⲡⲓϣⲁⲓ; died March 25, 1844) was a Coptic Orthodox martyr and saint.

== Life ==
Bishay was a government employee in the city of Damietta, Egypt, at the time of Muhammad Ali.

He was accused by Muslims of cursing Islam. Bishay was therefore brought to trial before a Muslim religious judge, who decreed that Sidhom Bishay must accept Islam and renounce Christianity, or else be put to death. Bishay refused to embrace Islam and insisted on his innocence.

He was whipped and brought before Damietta's governor, who confirmed the decree of the religious court. Sidhom Bishay was again flogged and put on a buffalo facing the tail. He was paraded around Damietta in this state and subjected to insults and humiliation. Eventually, molten tar was poured over his head and he was left outside the door of his home. His family attempted to nurse him, but he died five days later on 17 Paremhat 1565 A.M. (March 25, 1844). During these five days, members of Damietta's Christian community locked themselves in their homes for fear of attacks by the enraged mobs.

Sidhom Bishay's death outraged Damietta's Christian community, and Christians of all denominations gathered at his funeral. The Coptic Orthodox priests put on their vestments. Led by chanting deacons bearing banners surmounted by the cross, and headed by Hegoumenos Youssef Mikhael, the senior priest in Damietta, they progressed through the streets of the city until they reached the church where the funeral was held.

Following this incident, the leading Christians in Damietta asked the European consuls for help. Eventually, Mr. Michail Sorour, the official representative of seven European countries in Egypt, agreed to act as mediator between the Egyptian government and Pope Peter VII of Alexandria. Two government officials were charged with conducting an official enquiry, and the case was officially reopened. As a result, both the judge and the governor were dismissed. As a concession to the Christians of Damietta, they were granted the right to raise the Cross at their funerals and over their churches. This privilege was ultimately extended to the whole of Egypt during the pontificate of Pope Cyril IV of Alexandria.

Sidhom Bishay was subsequently canonized by the Coptic Orthodox Church. His body rests today in a glass-fronted shrine in the Cathedral of Saint Mary in Damietta.
