= Galala marble =

Galala or Galalah is an Egyptian limestone extracted from a mountain called Galala located in Suez, Egypt. It was named of the trade name of this mountain "Galala Marble". Its colours are creamy and creamy white as its variations differ according to the quarry stones.

Galala Physical and mechanical characteristics:

- Compressive strength kg/cm2 = 824.6
- Tensile strength kg/cm2m = 111.6
- Water absorption% = 0.12
- Density kg/m3 = 2,627

== See also ==
- Galala Mountain
