= Pope John XVII of Alexandria =

Head of the Coptic Church from 1727 to 1745

- Pope of Alexandria & Patriarch of the See of St. Mark
- Papacy began: 12 January 1727
- Papacy ended: 20 April 1745
- Predecessor: Peter VI
- Successor: Mark VII

Personal details
- Born: Mallawi, Egypt
- Died: 20 April 1745 Egypt
- Buried: Saint Mercurius Church in Coptic Cairo
- Denomination: Coptic Orthodox Christian
- Residence: Saint Mary Church (Haret Elroum)

Pope John XVII of Alexandria (Abba Youannis XVII), 105th Pope of Alexandria & Patriarch of the See of St. Mark.

Originally from Mallawi in El-Minya in Upper Egypt, joined the Monastery of Saint Paul the Anchorite as a monk and was named Abd el-Sayed

Oriental Orthodox titles
| Preceded by Peter VI | Coptic Pope; 1727–1745 | Succeeded by Mark VII |
