= Pope Peter VII of Alexandria =

Head of the Coptic Church from 1809 to 1852

- Pope of Alexandria & Patriarch of the See of St. Mark
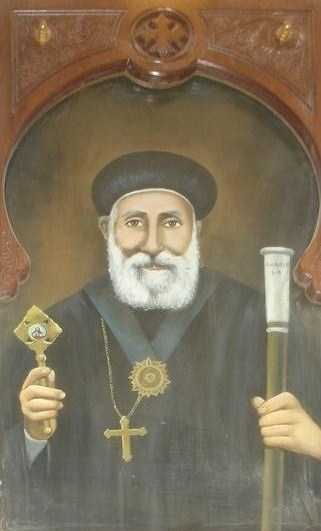
- Papacy began: 24 December 1809
- Papacy ended: 5 April 1852
- Predecessor: Mark VIII
- Successor: Cyril IV

Personal details
- Born: Mankarius Gawly - Manfalut, Egypt
- Died: 15 April 1852 Egypt
- Buried: Saint Mark's Coptic Orthodox Cathedral (Azbakeya)
- Denomination: Coptic Orthodox Christian
- Residence: Saint Mark's Coptic Orthodox Cathedral (Azbakeya)

Pope Peter VII of Alexandria (Abba Boutros El-Gawly) (d. 1852) was the 109th Coptic pope of Alexandria and patriarch of the see of St. Mark.

He was born in the village of El-Gawly in Upper Egypt, and known as Mankarius while a monk at the Monastery of Saint Anthony on the Red Sea.

During his papacy, sensing intimations of pressure from Roman Catholicism, the Coptic Church intensified her teaching, her preaching, and her pastoral work, and the Coptic Pope himself intensified his writing on matters of faith and doctrine. During the period, many private and public patriarchal libraries were founded.

When the Russian Tsar sent his delegates with an offer to put the Coptic Church under his protection, Pope Peter declined the proposal by asking, "Does your Emperor live forever?" When the envoy answered that he would die, like all humans, the Pope told him that he preferred the Protector of the Church who would not die.

The papal throne stood vacant for a little over one year before his successor, Cyril IV, was elected.

Also during the papacy, Saint Sidhom Bishay was martyred at the hands of Muslims in Damietta. His martyrdom made possible the raising of the Cross openly during Christian funeral processions, for this practice was previously forbidden.

His feast date is 28 Paremhat.

== Source and further details ==
- Coptic Orthodox Synaxarium (Book of Saints)

=== References ===
Oriental Orthodox titles
Preceded by Mark VIII	Coptic Pope; 1809–1852	Succeeded by Cyril IV
