= The Temptation of St. Anthony =

The Temptation of St. Anthony is an episode in the life of the Christian monk Anthony the Great.

The Temptation of St. Anthony may also refer to:

== Visual arts ==
- Temptation of Saint Anthony in visual arts, including a list of works with the title

== Other arts ==
- The Temptation of Saint Anthony (novel), an 1874 novel by Gustave Flaubert
- The Temptation of Saint Anthony (film), an 1898 silent film
- The Temptation of Saint Anthony (opera), a 2003 opera by Bernice Johnson Reagon
- "The Temptation of St. Anthony", a movement of Symphony: Mathis der Maler by Paul Hindemith
- "The Temptation of Saint Anthony", a 2013 song by Alkaline Trio from My Shame Is True
