= Pope Peter VI of Alexandria =

Head of the Coptic Church from 1718 to 1726

Pope Peter VI
- Pope of Alexandria & Patriarch of the See of St. Mark
- Papacy began: 21 August 1718
- Papacy ended: 2 April 1726
- Predecessor: John XVI
- Successor: John XVII

Personal details
- Died: 2 April 1726 Egypt
- Buried: Saint Mercurius Church in Coptic Cairo
- Denomination: Coptic Orthodox Christian
- Residence: Saint Mary Church (Haret Elroum)

Pope Peter VI of Alexandria (Abba Petros VI) was the 104th Pope of Alexandria & Patriarch of the See of St. Mark from 1718 to 1726.

Oriental Orthodox titles
Preceded by John XVI	Coptic Pope; 1718–1726	Succeeded by John XVII
