= Galala Mountain =

Mountain in Egypt

Coordinates: 29.3880560°N 32.5061110°E

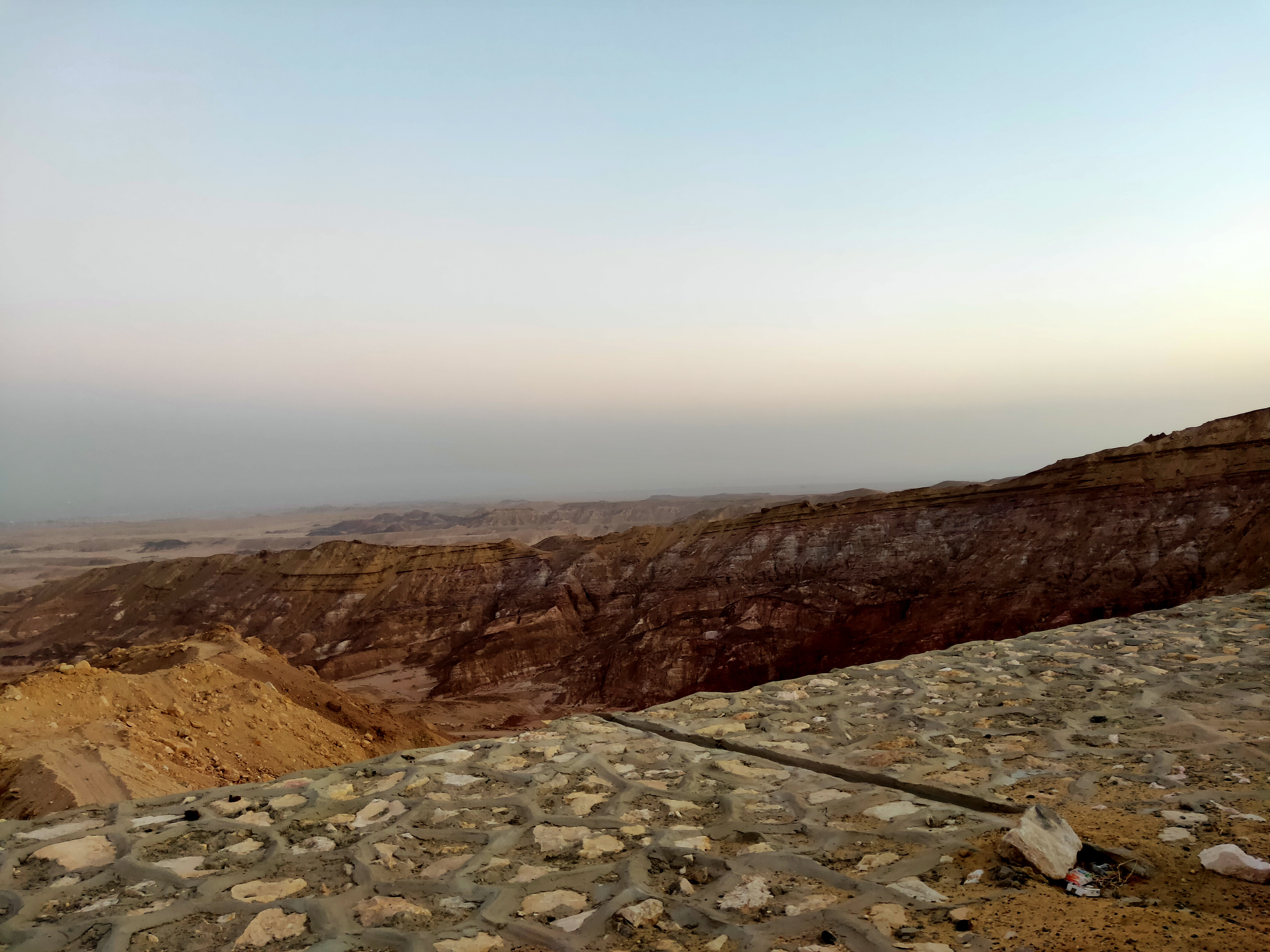
Sunset on Galala Plateau

Galala Mountain or Galalah Mountain (Arabic: جبل الجلالة, romanized: Jabal al-Jalāla) is a mountain located in Suez Governorate, Egypt, with an elevation of 3,300 ft above sea level. It contains many species of plants and once had sources of water that have since dried up. Galala Mountain was called the Gallayat Plateaus until it was renamed in the 1920s. Galala Mountain is famous for Galala marble, which is quarried for export and has a colour that varies from creamy to creamy white.

A study was conducted in 1989 to explore the feasibility of using water from the Red Sea for Galala, with promising results.

A large construction project in Galala, supported by President Abdel Fattah Al-Sisi and investors alike, was underway as of 2018 to build a city to support tourism in the area.

== See also ==
- Monastery of Saint Anthony
