= Pope John XVI of Alexandria =

Head of the Coptic Church from 1676 to 1718

Pope John XVI
- Pope of Alexandria & Patriarch of the See of St. Mark
- Papacy began: 5 May 1676
- Papacy ended: 15 June 1718
- Predecessor: Matthew IV
- Successor: Peter VI

Personal details
- Born: Ibrahim al-Tukhi Takh El-Nasara the diocese of El-Menoufia, Egypt
- Died: 15 June 1718 Egypt
- Buried: Saint Mercurius Church in Coptic Cairo
- Denomination: Coptic Orthodox Christian
- Residence: Saint Mary Church (Haret Elroum)

Pope John XVI of Alexandria (born Ibrahim al-Tukhi) was the 103rd Pope of Alexandria & Patriarch of the See of St. Mark from 1676 to 1718.

He died on 10 Paoni 1434 A.M. (15 June 1718).

Oriental Orthodox titles
Preceded by Matthew IV	Coptic Pope; 1676–1718	Succeeded by Peter VI
