= Marina of the Zabbaleen =

- Theatrical release poster
- Directed by: Engi Wassef
- Written by: Engi Wassef
- Produced by: Engi Wassef
- Cinematography: Rob Hauer
- Edited by: Nicholas Martin
- Music by: Michiel Neuman
- Release date: April 2008 (Tribeca Film Festival)
- Running time: 70 minutes
- Languages: Arabic, English

Marina of the Zabbaleen is a 2008 documentary film written and directed by Engi Wassef that examines the life of Marina, a 7-year-old Egyptian girl living in a Zabbaleen garbage-collecting village in Cairo. The film debuted at the 2008 Tribeca Film Festival with sold-out screenings. The film piqued the interest of many movie goers with its poignant tagline, "Garbage and God are the only options: plight of Christians peasants in Cairo."

== Synopsis ==
The film is set in the Moqattam village, on the outskirts of Cairo, where Coptic Christians from rural Upper Egypt make their living as garbage collectors and recyclers. Moqattam is a toxic shantytown where mountains of trash stand in filthy contrast to the nearby Great Pyramids. Here, the impoverished but industrious locals earn their living by bundling and reselling paper, and raising pigs amidst the rotting refuse. Very few of the youngsters raised ever receive a proper education.

The film transforms the gritty landfill Zabbaleen village (known locally as "Garbage City"), one of the very few Coptic Christian communities in a mostly Muslim-populated Cairo, into a beautiful, dreamlike portrait of family, childhood, and spirituality.

The film introduces us to the intricate world of seven-year-old Marina, the middle child in a family of five, a girl who, despite the decaying ghetto she lives in, spends her days riding flying elephants and befriending mystical pigeons. She dreams of becoming a doctor.

== Making of the film ==
Wassef was granted an unprecedented degree access to the normally very isolated and secretive city, filming everything from its trash-strewn streets to its immaculate churches that have been pridefully carved into the surrounding sacred mountains by the locals. She attributed this to the trust she had built with the local people, aided, perhaps, by the fact that like the Zabbaleen, she too is a Coptic Christian of Egyptian background. With time, the people of Moqattam become comfortable enough with her and her camera to allow her to film honest, complete views of their typical daily lives.

== Reception ==
Banned in Egypt, Marina of the Zabbaleen premiered in April 2008 at the Tribeca Film Festival. The film was hailed as a gorgeous and "painterly" account of the troubled daily life of an obscure but revealing Middle Eastern people.

It was an official selection for the following festivals in 2008-2009:

- Tribeca Film Festival
- Dubai International Film Festival
- National Geographic DC Environmental Film Festival
- Jerusalem International Film Festival
- Lighthouse International Film Festival
- Onghiara International Film Festival
- Salem Film Festival
- Sea Studios Film Festival
- Thessaloniki International Film Festival
- Vancouver International Film Festival
- Beloit International Film Festival

== Awards ==
- It won Silver Muhr (the 2nd place) for "Best Documentary" and "Best Arabic Documentary" at the Dubai International Film Festival (DIFF).

== Sources ==
- Moving Pictures Magazine: 'Zabbaleen' Through a Child’s Eyes
- Rotten Tomatoes page of the film

== See also ==
- Garbage Dreams
