= Simon the Tanner =

Coptic Orthodox saint associated with the story of moving Mokattam Mountain

Saint Simon the Tanner
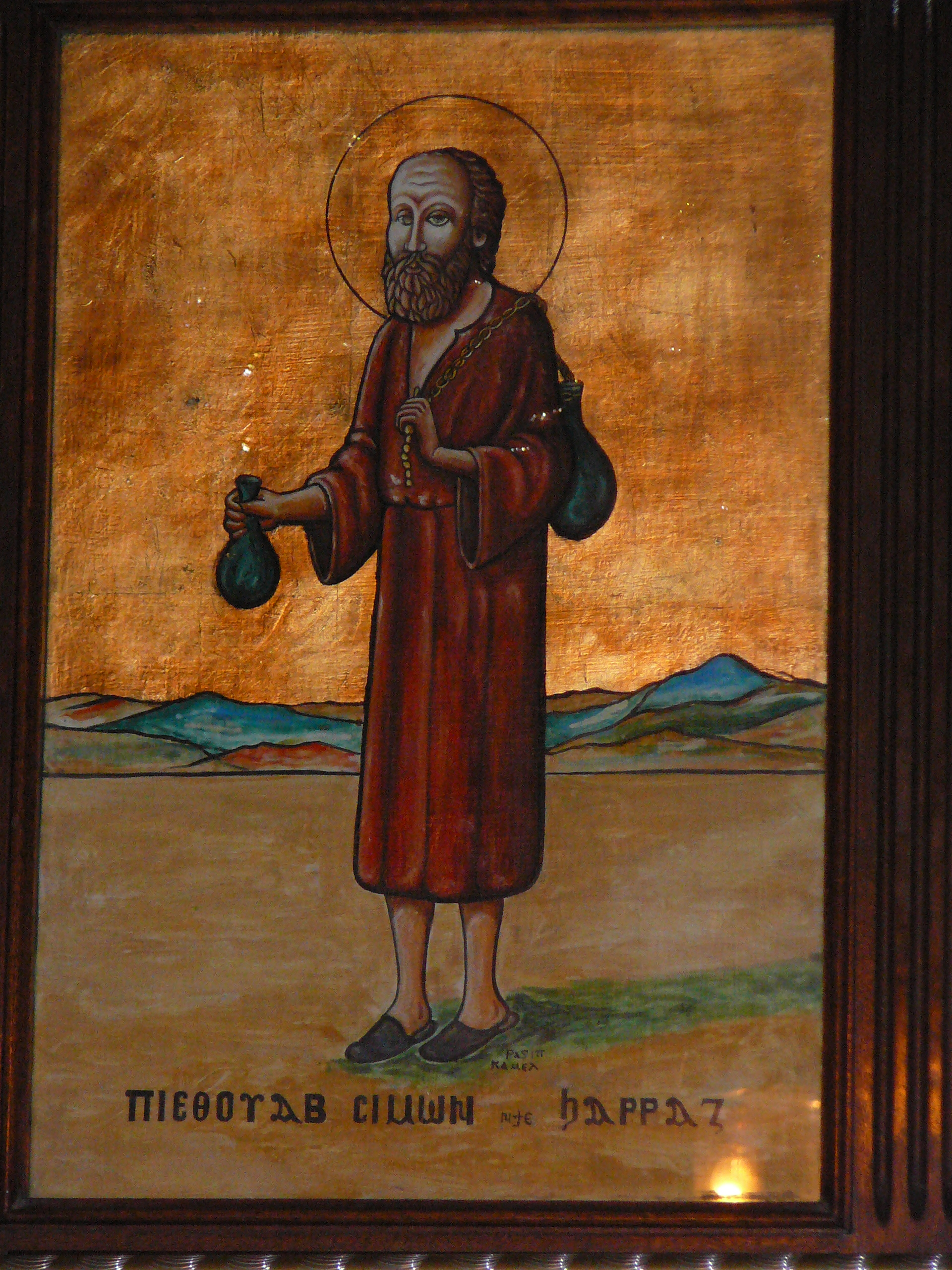
- Coptic icon of Saint Simon the Shoemaker depicted as a one-eyed man carrying waterskins, as he used to carry water to the sick and the old every morning before going to work.
- Born: 10th century Egypt
- Died: 10th century Old Cairo, Egypt
- Venerated in: Coptic Orthodox Church; Syriac Orthodox Church
- Major shrine: St. Simon the Tanner Coptic Orthodox Monastery (Zabbaleen, Mokattam)
- Attributes: One eye, eyepatch, waterskins

Simon the Tanner (fl. 10th century), also known as Simon the Shoemaker (Coptic: Ⲫⲏⲉⲑⲟⲩⲁⲃ Ⲥⲓⲙⲱⲛ Ⲡⲓⲃⲁⲕϣⲁⲣ; Ⲡⲓϩⲟⲙ, Ϧⲁⲣⲣⲁⲍ, romanized: Fiethouav Simōn Pivakšar; Pišom, lit. 'Simon the Shoemaker; Craftsman'; Arabic: سمعان الدباغ, romanized: Sama'an al-Dabagh), is the Coptic Orthodox saint associated with the story of the moving the Mokattam Mountain in Cairo, Egypt, during the rule of the Muslim Fatimid Caliph al-Muizz Lideenillah (953–975) while Abraham the Syrian was the Pope of the Coptic Orthodox Church of Alexandria.

== Life ==
Simon the Tanner lived toward the end of the 10th century and many Coptic Christians in Egypt were engaged in handicrafts. Simon worked in tanning, a craft known there till this day. This profession involved other crafts that depend on the process, from whence Simon carried several titles related to skins: Tanner, Cobbler, Shoemaker.

== Miracle of moving the mountain ==
According to a traditional story, Caliph al-Muizz, who reigned during AD 972–975, used to invite religious leaders to debate in his presence. In one of those meetings in which the patriarch Abraham, also known as Pope Abraam, and a Jew named Yaqub ibn Killis (in another account of this story he was referred to as Moses) were present, Abraham got the upper hand in the debate. Plotting to take revenge, Ibn Killis quoted the verse where Jesus Christ said in the Gospel of Matthew: "He replied, "Truly I tell you, if you have faith as small as a mustard seed, you can say to this mountain, 'Move from here to there,' and it will move. Nothing will be impossible for you."" (Matthew 17:20), and demanded that the Pope prove that his religion is right by means of this. After hearing ibn Killis say this, the caliph asked Abraham "What sayest thou concerning this word? Is it your gospel or not?" The patriarch answered "Yes, it is in it." After hearing Abraham answer, the caliph demanded that this very miracle be performed by Abraham's hand or else he and all the Copts would be killed by the sword. The patriarch asked for three days to complete the miracle.

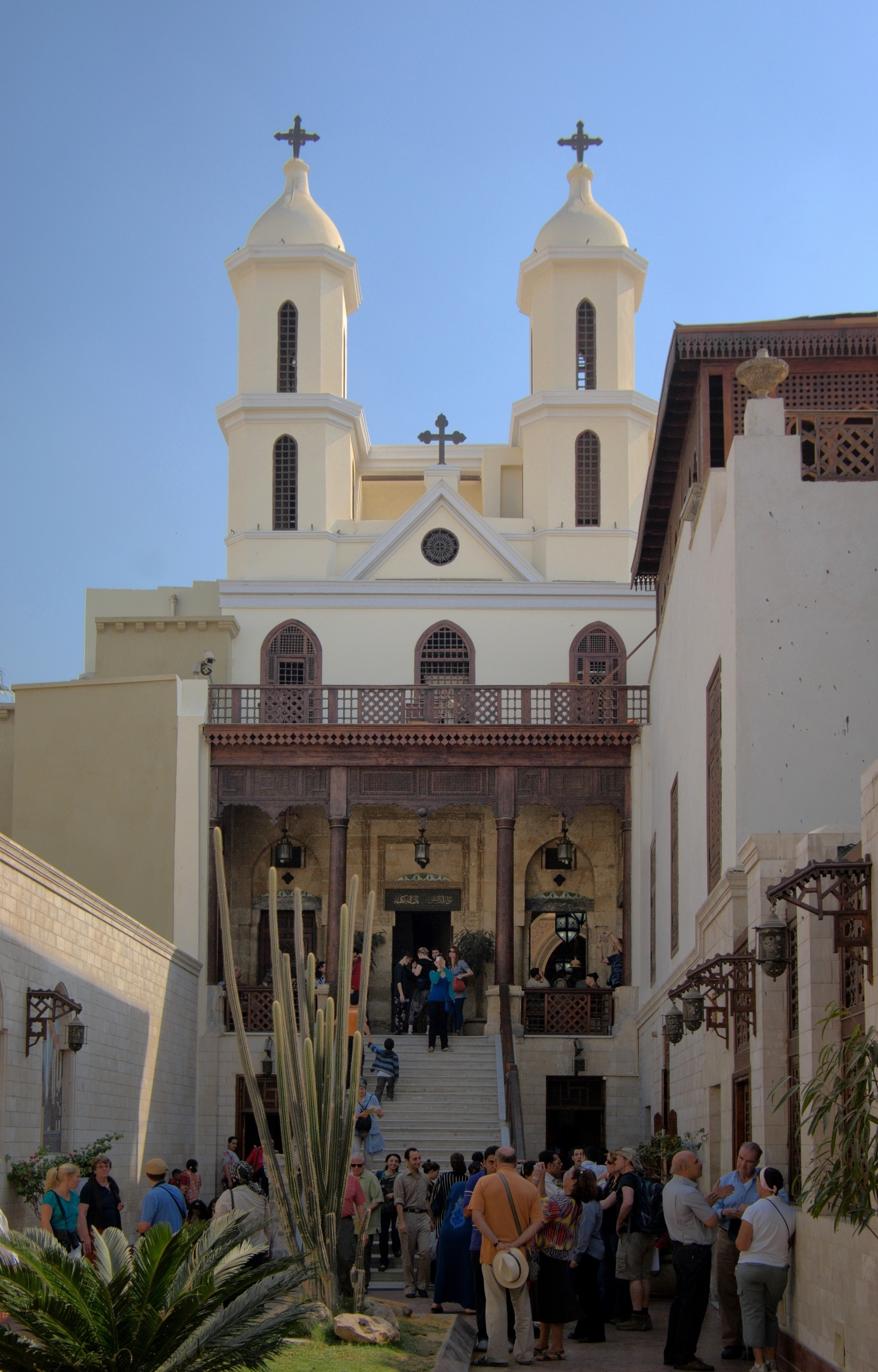
The Hanging Church, Cairo, built in the 3rd or 4th century

Abraham put together a group of monks, priests and elders. He told them stay in the church for three days for a penance. On the morning of the third day, Abraham was praying in the Hanging Church, when he saw Mary, mother of Jesus. The Holy Virgin told him to go to the great market. She said to him, "There thou wilt find a one-eyed man carrying on his shoulder a jar full of water; seize him, for he it is at whose hands this miracle shall be manifested." Abraham listened to Mary and went to the market where he met the man the Holy Virgin spoke of. The man was Simon the tanner, who had plucked out his eye because of a passage from the Bible: "If your right eye causes you to stumble, gouge it out and throw it away. It is better for you to lose one part of your body than for your whole body to be thrown into hell." (Matthew 5:29–30)

Simon told Abraham to go out with his priests and all his people to the mountain with the Caliph and all his soldiers. Simon then told Abraham to cry out "O Lord, have mercy" three times and each time to make the sign of the cross over the mountain. The patriarch followed the words of Simon and the mountain was lifted. After the miracle was performed in the presence of the Caliph, the Pope turned left and right looking for Simon, but he had disappeared and no one could find him. The Caliph turned to Abraham and said "O Patriarch, I have recognized the correctness of your faith."

Shortly after the miracle took place, Al-Muizz decided to convert to Christianity, abdicated in favour of his son and entered a monastery. A baptismal font, large enough for the immersion of a grown man, was built for him in the Church of Saint Mercurius. This font still exists today at the site where Al-Muizz was converted and is known as "Maamoudiat Al-Sultan", 'Baptistery of the Sultan'. This story is rejected by influential Muslim historians such as Ahmad Zaki Pasha and Muhammad Abdullah Enan.

In commemoration of this miracle, the Coptic Orthodox Church observes three extra days of fasting before the beginning of the Nativity Fast.

Many more details of the story are found on a Coptic website, which claims that the miracle occurred on November 27, 979 AD.

== Discovery of Saint Simon's relics ==
During the years of 1989–91, Coptic clergymen and archaeologists searched for the relics of the 10th century tanner and saint, Simon. Simon was apparently buried in the cemetery of al-Habash in Old Cairo; however, while searching for Simon's relics, his skeleton was discovered in the Coptic Orthodox Church of the Holy Virgin at Babylon El-Darag during its restoration. Simon's skeleton was discovered on August 4, 1991, about one meter below the surface of the church. What was of particular interest when finding his skeleton was that the hair on his head was still intact and had not disintegrated. The hair that was intact was only on the back of his skull and it was deduced that the man was bald in front and had thick hair on the back of his head.

In the church where Simon's skeleton was found there was a painting that depicted the Coptic Pope Abraham and a bald-headed tanner carrying two water jars. The bald-headed man is most likely Simon because he was known for carrying water jars to the poor. The painting further depicted some of the characteristics of the discovered skeleton. In a church nearby a pot was discovered and was dated to be more than 1000 years old. It is believed that this clay pot was the vessel that Simon used to carry water to the poor. The jar is now kept in the new Church of Saint Simon on Mokattam, Cairo.

== Dedicated places of worship ==
=== Virgin Mary and St. Simon the Tanner Cathedral, Cairo ===
^{Coordinates: 30.030543°N 31.2765053°E}

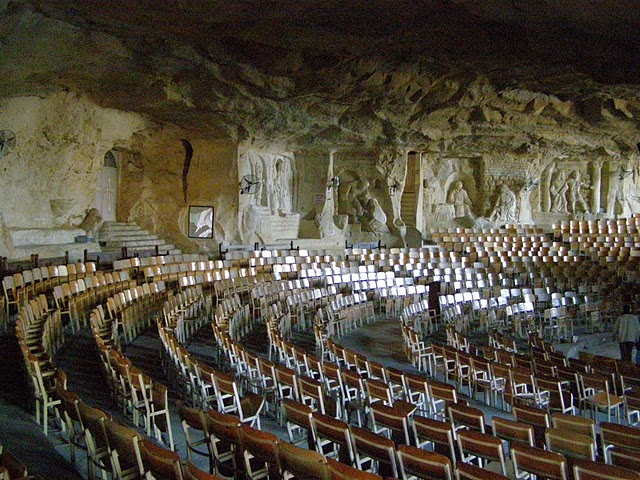
St. Simon the Tanner's Hall

Virgin Mary and St. Simon the Tanner Cathedral in the Saint Samaan the Tanner Monastery is on the east bank of the Nile behind the Zabbaleen village. The Zabbaleen village where the garbage collectors of Cairo live. In 1969 the governor of Cairo decided to move all of the garbage collectors to the Mokattam. In 1987 there were approximately 15,000 people living in the Zabbaleen village.

The final leg of the journey into the monastery is through the streets of Zabbaleen Village, also known as Garbage City.

=== Monastery of Saint Simon, Aswan ===
The Monastery of Saint Simon, Aswan does not seem to have any direct connection with St Simeon. It is accessible by either crossing the desert from Qubbet el-Hawa or by sailing across the Nile from Aswan and then walking up the Wadi al-Qurqur. The monastery, which was originally dedicated to Anbâ Hadra of Aswân, was later renamed to Saint Simon.

It was built in the 7th century and reconstructed in the 10th century. By the 13th century, however, the monastery was in ruin; there was an inscription found there that said that a Mutammar Ali had visited in 1295 A.D. Although though the monastery was ruined, its main features were preserved.

One of the churches in the monastery had numerous Coptic inscriptions inside and there were slabs of stones giving the history of many of the monks that had lived there.

== See also ==
- Al-Muizz Lideenillah
- Coptic Cairo
- Coptic saints
- Fasting and abstinence of the Coptic Orthodox Church of Alexandria
