= Manshiyat Naser =

District of Greater Cairo, Egypt

Coordinates: 30°01′56.08″N 31°16′31.03″E

Manshiyat Nasser (Arabic: منشية ناصر Arabic pronunciation: [mænˈʃejjet ˈnɑːsˤeɾ]; Coptic: ⲙⲁⲛϫⲓⲛⲑⲱⲟⲩϯ ⲛ̀ⲛⲓⲭⲣⲓⲥⲧⲓⲁⲛⲟⲥ manjintōudi enikristianos, sometimes called "the Christian suburb", Coptic pronunciation: [mɑnʃɪnˈtoːwdi ənnɪˈkrɪstjɑnos]) is one of the nine districts that make up the Western Area of Cairo, Egypt. It covers 5.54 square kilometers, and was home to 258,372 people in the 2017 census. It borders Nasr City to the east, central Cairo districts to the west (Historic Cairo), and the Mokattam district to the south.

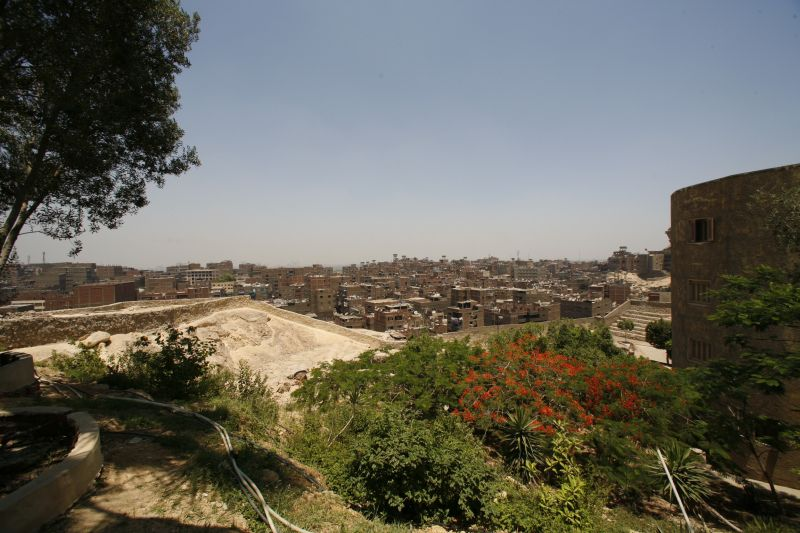
View of the "Garbage City" in Manshiyat Nasser

It is famous for the Garbage City quarter, which is a slum settlement at the far southern end of Manshiyat Naser, at the base of Mokattam hills on the outskirts of Cairo. Being Cairo's largest concentration of "Zabbaleen" garbage collectors, its economy revolves around the collection and recycling of the city's garbage.

Although Manshiyat Naser has streets, shops, and apartments as other areas of the city, it lacks infrastructure and often has no running water, sewers, or electricity.

== District subdivisions and population ==
Manshiyat Nasser district covers eight shiakhas that include al-Mujawirin, Sultan Qaytbay and Sultan Barquq in Historic Cairo's eastern cemetery field (sometimes known as the City of the Dead), al-Kahzzan (popularly known as Zabbalin or Garbage City) to al-Mahagir (literally quarries, also known as Ezbet Bekheit) that cover the disused quarries at the western foothills of the Moqattam Plateau, and al-Duweika (Al-Doweiqa) on the northern edge of the Moqattam Plateau.

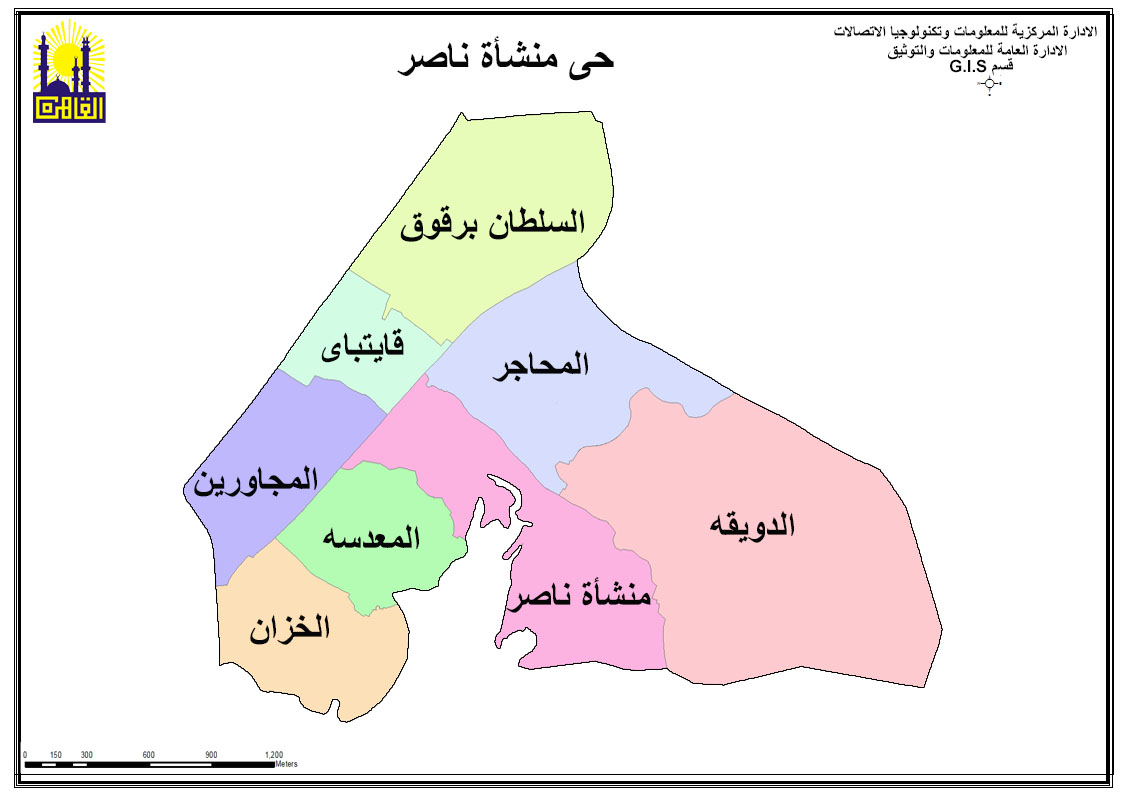
Map of the Manshiyat Nasser District and its shiakha subdivisions

Manshiyat Nasser had 258,372 residents in the 2017 census, across its eight shiakhas:

Shiakha	Code 2017	Population
Duweika, al-	011308	65225
Khazzân, al-	011301	13735
Maḥâjir, al-	011303	76658
Minsha’at Nâṣir	011307	51844
Mu`adsa, al-	011302	42313
Mujâwirîn, al-	011305	367
Qâytbây	011306	4916
Sulṭân Barqûq, al-	011304	3314

== Coptic district ==
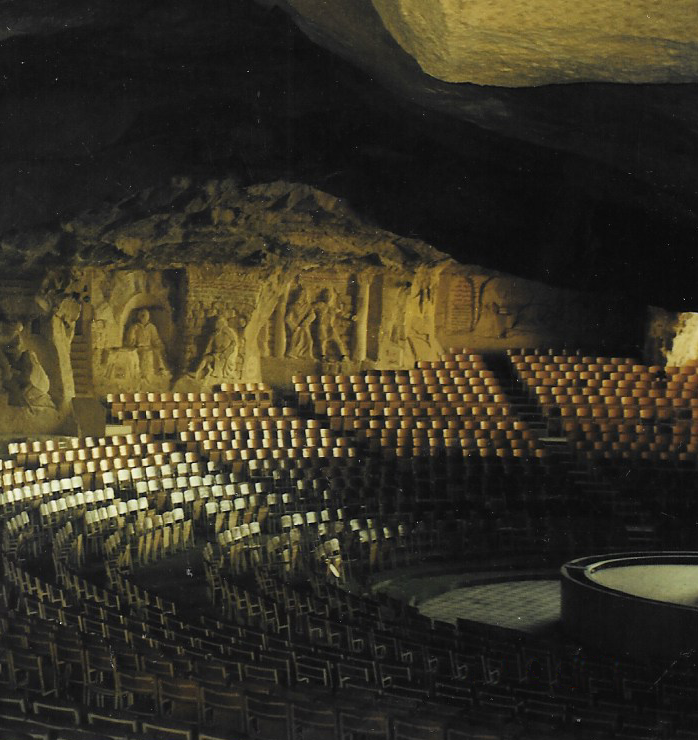
The Cave Cathedral (St Sama'ans Church), is built into the side of the cliff past and above the streets of Manshiyat Naser

Coptic Christians were originally the predominant inhabitants of Manshiyat Naser, though in recent decades the area's Muslim population has grown. The Christians are well known for herding swine within the city, which are fed edible pieces of garbage and marketed across Cairo to Coptic Christian establishments. However, in the spring of 2009, the Egyptian government, in response to the worldwide threat of swine flu, embarked on a massive program to cull the herds of pigs in Manshiyat Naser.

The Cave Cathedral or St Sama'ans Church, used by the Coptic Christians in Garbage City, is the largest church in the Middle East, with seating for 15,000 people.

== Garbage and recycling ==
The city's garbage is brought to the Garbage City in Manshiyat Naser by the Zabbaleen (garbage collectors), who then sort through the garbage to attempt to retrieve any potentially useful or recyclable items. Families typically specialize in a particular type of garbage they sort and sell—one room of children sorting out plastic bottles, while the next of women separating cans from the rest. Anything that can be reused or recycled is saved by one of the numerous families in Manshiyat Naser. Various recycled paper and glass products are made and sold from the city, while metal is sold by the kilo to be melted down and reused. Carts pulled by horse or donkey are often stacked 2.5 to 3 m (8 to 10 ft) high with the recyclable goods. More than 14,000 tons of garbage are processed each day, 85% of Cairo's waste. Some recycled goods are sold on to Europe and North America.

Children playing in a portable swimming pool.

The economic system in the Garbage City is classified as the informal sector. Most families typically have worked in the same area and type of specialization in the garbage piles and continue to make enough money to support themselves.

== Media ==
Garbage Dreams is a 2009 documentary directed by Mai Iskander about boys born and raised in the Garbage City and how they must look for new ways to support themselves and their families as trash collection in Cairo changes.

== See also ==
- City of the Dead (Cairo)
- 2008 Duweika, Cairo Rockslide
- Waste management in Egypt
