= 2008 Duweika, Cairo Rockslide =

Landslide that happened on September 6, 2008, in Manshiyat Naser, Cairo, Egypt

Coordinates: 30.0457°N 31.2882°E

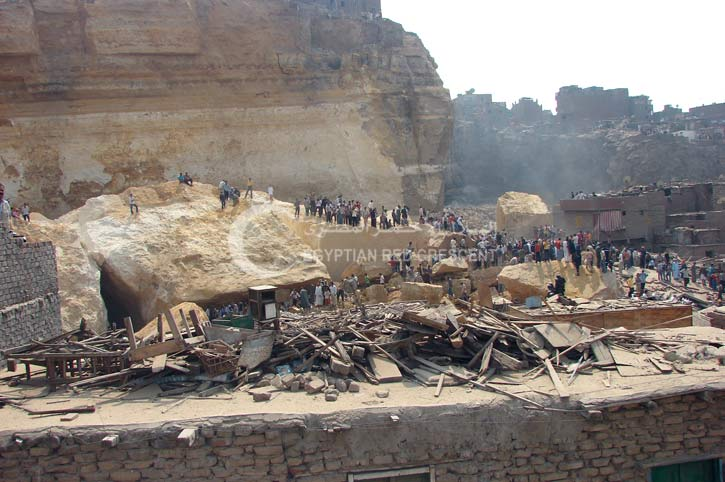
Duweika rockslide aftermath, Cairo, Egypt

The 2008 Duweika Rockslide happened on September 6, 2008, at a crowded self-built settlement in the Manshiyat Nasser district of Cairo, Egypt, resulting in the first major urban disaster to hit the city in the 21st Century, where over 100 were killed, and hundreds of families were made homeless.

== Event ==
Just before 9 am, on September 6, 2008, a series of rockslides occurred after eight gigantic boulders each the size of a small house and weighing as much as 70 tons, broke off from the side of a cliff of the Duweika Plateau (an extension of the limestone Muqattam formation), in the district of Manshiyat Nasser in Cairo, crashing down on the homes of the settlement of Ezbet Bekhit below.

The first of the rockslides was also the most disastrous, destroying at least 166 homes, killing 119 people, and injuring 55 others according to official statistics. Local eyewitness reports from residents and local councilmen indicate the toll to be much higher. In the immediate aftermath 266 families lost their homes and had to camp in shelters at local and farther off sports facilities. A series of more limited rockslides occurred in the ensuing three weeks.

== Aftermath ==
After a large part of the neighbourhood had been flattened by the rockslide, approximately 1500 families still living there and on the plateau above were evicted and any remaining buildings were flattened by the government. As a result, hundreds of families were left homeless and many still live in squalor near the site of the disaster, despite government promises to find them homes.

The cause of the landslide has not been definitively determined, but theories included leaked sewage from development projects that eroded rocks. An internal investigation determined that the slide was caused by "fate" and no one would be blamed for it.

According to Amnesty International, authorities failed to evacuate the impoverished residents and provide them with temporary or alternative housing. People living in areas deemed unsafe in Al-Duweika and Ezbet Bekhit were forced out in a manner which breached the international standards that states must observe while carrying out evictions.

== Trials of officials ==
It also took 14 months for charges of manslaughter of the 119 victims of the rockslide to be brought against government officials: Major General Mahmoud Yassin, Deputy Governor of the Western Area of Cairo, two former heads of the Manshiyet Nasser District, the manager and deputy manager of the local Housing Department, and the heads of the local Rocks and Property Departments.

The first round of trials took four months, when in May 2010 the Manshiyat Nasser Misdemeanor Court sentenced the deputy governor Mahmoud Yassin, to five years of imprisonment. Seven other officials were sentenced to three years each. This verdict was appealed with two acquitted and the rest receiving shorter sentences. A third round of appeal at the highest court, the Court of Cassation, the court amended the remaining one sentences to a one-year suspended prison sentence on September 16, 2014, days after the sixth anniversary of the disaster. In the end, no one was jailed for the Duweika disaster, even though all evidence pointed to it being the cause of man-made interventions, as well as complacency from district officials.
