= Zabbaleen =

Cairo's informal garbage collectors

Zabbaleen زبالين
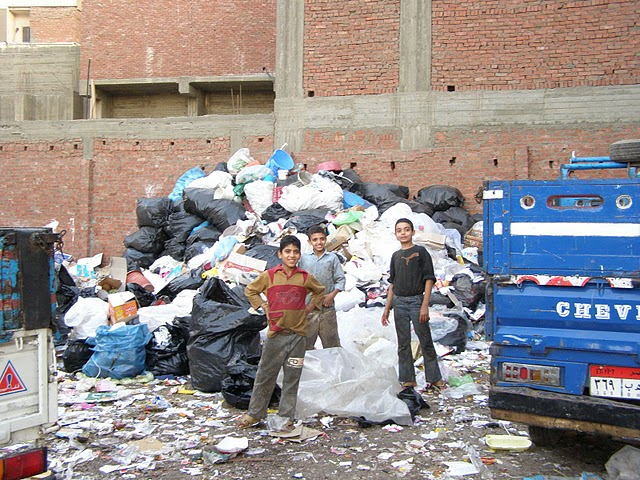
- A group of Zabbaleen boys at Mokattam village

Total population
- Between 50,000 and 70,000. Some sources estimate over 80,000.

Regions with significant populations
- Mokattam village, Garbage City, at the foot of the Mokattam Mountains.: 20,000 - 30,000

Languages
- Egyptian Arabic

Religion
- Christianity

The Zabbaleen (Egyptian Arabic: زبالين Zabbalīn, IPA: [zæbbæˈliːn]) is a word which literally means "garbage people" in Egyptian Arabic. The contemporary use of the word in Egyptian Arabic is to mean "garbage collectors". In cultural contexts, the word refers to teenagers and adults who have served as Cairo's informal garbage collectors since approximately the 1940s. The Zabbaleen (singular: زبال Zabbāl, [zæbˈbæːl]) are also known as Zarraba (singular: Zarrab), which means "pig-pen operators." The word Zabbalīn came from the Egyptian Arabic word zebāla ([zeˈbæːlæ], زبالة) which means "garbage".

Spread out among seven different settlements scattered in the Greater Cairo Urban Region, the Zabbaleen population is between 50,000 and 70,000. The largest settlement is Mokattam village, nicknamed "Garbage City," located at the foot of the Mokattam Plateau, next to Manshiyat Nasser. The Zabbaleen community has a population of around 20,000 to 30,000, over 90 percent of which are poor Coptic Christians living in self-built homes, many in slum conditions.

For several generations, the Zabbaleen supported themselves by collecting trash door-to-door from the residents of Cairo for nearly no charge. The Zabbaleen recycle up to 80 percent of the waste that they collect via local Egyptian companies, whereas most Western garbage collecting companies only recycle 20 to 25 percent of the waste that they collect.

The Zabbaleen use donkey-pulled carts and pickup trucks to transport the garbage that they collect from the residents of Cairo. They then transport the garbage to their homes in Mokattam Village, where they sort the collected items, then either sell the sorted items to middlemen or create new materials from it themselves. The living situation for the Zabbaleen is poor; they live amongst the trash that they sort in their village, and with the pigs to which they feed their organic waste. Nevertheless, the Zabbaleen have formed a strong and tight-knit community.

However, their way of life has come under threat after the Cairo municipal authorities’ decision in 2003 to award annual contracts of $50 million to three multinational garbage disposal companies. The government authorities do not compensate the Zabbaleen for these changes, and as a result, the takeover of waste collection threatens the socio-economic sustainability of the Zabbaleen community.

The Zabbaleen faced a major challenge when the Egyptian Agricultural Ministry ordered the culling of all pigs in April 2009 in response to national fears over the possible spread of H1N1 influenza. This governmental decision posed a major setback to the Zabbaleen because pigs, who eat the organic waste, are an essential component to their recycling and sorting system. Immediately after the culling of pigs, observers noticed a visible increase in piles of trash and rotting food on the streets of Cairo. There are also worries that the Egyptian government is seeking to remove the Mokattam Village entirely and relocate the Zabbaleen further outside of Cairo by a further 25 km, to a 50-feddan (51.9-acre) plot in Cairo's eastern desert settlement of Katameya.

== Historical background ==
=== First wave of migration ===
Around the 1910s, a group of Muslim migrants from the Dakhla oasis in the Western desert of Egypt relocated to Cairo in an area known as Bab El Bahr, which is situated between Attaba and Ramses square in downtown Cairo. These people are known as the Wahiya (singular: wahi), which means people of the oasis. The Wahiya assumed the sole responsibility for the collection and disposal of Cairo's household waste under the framework of contracts with building owners in Cairo. In this system, the Wahiya paid the owners of buildings an initial sum and then collected monthly fees from the tenants for their services.

=== Second wave of migration ===
In the 1930s and 40s, there was a second wave of migration. This new group, mostly landless peasants, is known as the Zabbaleen. The descendants of subsistence farmers, the Zabbaleen originate from the El Badari district in Asyut, a rural region in Upper Egypt, which is the southern part of Egypt. As farming ceased to be a viable way of life, the Zabbaleen faced economic hardships which prompted them to migrate to Cairo in search of work. Henceforth, the Wahiya collaborated with the Zabbaleen, who purchased waste from the Wahiya for use as fodder for pig farming. Initially, the Zabbaleen settled in the Imbaba district of the Giza governorate, but were given a four-day eviction notice from the governor of Giza in 1970. Thereafter, the Zabbaleen settled mainly in an abandoned quarry at the foot of the Mokattam hills, east of Cairo, which is under the jurisdiction of the Cairo Governorate. Although the governor of Cairo granted the Zabbaleen administrative permission to settle in the area, he did not issue a lease or legal tenure. Thus, because of their precarious situation, the Zabbaleen initially lived in makeshift settlements of tin huts, made mostly of barrels that the Zabbaleen found amongst the waste that they collected. This Zabbaleen community later emerged as the informal garbage collectors and recyclers of Cairo. The literal meaning of the word Zabbaleen is garbage-men (singular: Zabbal). The Zabbaleen are also known as Zarraba (singular: Zarrab), which means pig pen operators, because they raise pigs that eat the organic components of the waste that they collect.

=== 1989 agreement between Wahiya and Zabbaleen ===
Prior to the migration of the Zabbaleen, the Wahiya had used the refuse, after drying it, as a source of energy—specifically as fuel for public baths and bean cookeries. However, this use of dried refuse became obsolete in the 1930s when fuel oil became the preferred fuel for public baths and bean cookeries. This coincided with the migration of the Zabbaleen, who used the organic components of the wastes to feed their pigs. Thus, the Wahiya began to sell the organic refuse to the Zabbaleen. Because the Zabbaleen needed to obtain waste food before it rots, they preferred to collect the refuse themselves using their own donkey carts.

The Zabbaleen can be distinguished from the Wahiya in at least two ways. First, the Wahiya retained control over the access and collection rights to the monthly fees paid by the residents, whereas the Zabbaleen usually do not have a share in the monthly fees paid by residents. In fact, the Zabbaleen are often obliged to pay the Wahiya in order to gain access to the waste garbage. However, what the Zabbaleen do acquire are the rights to the refuse itself. Hence, the relationship between the Wahiya and the Zabbaleen was hierarchically constituted. The Wahiya acted as the middlemen between the Zabbaleen and Cairo's households. Quoting Assaad, "The wahiya assume overall responsibility for regular removal of the wastes vis-à-vis residents and building owners and are responsible for collection of the wastes from individual dwelling units to the street level. The Zabbaleen, on the other hand, are responsible for the haulage and disposal of the wastes."

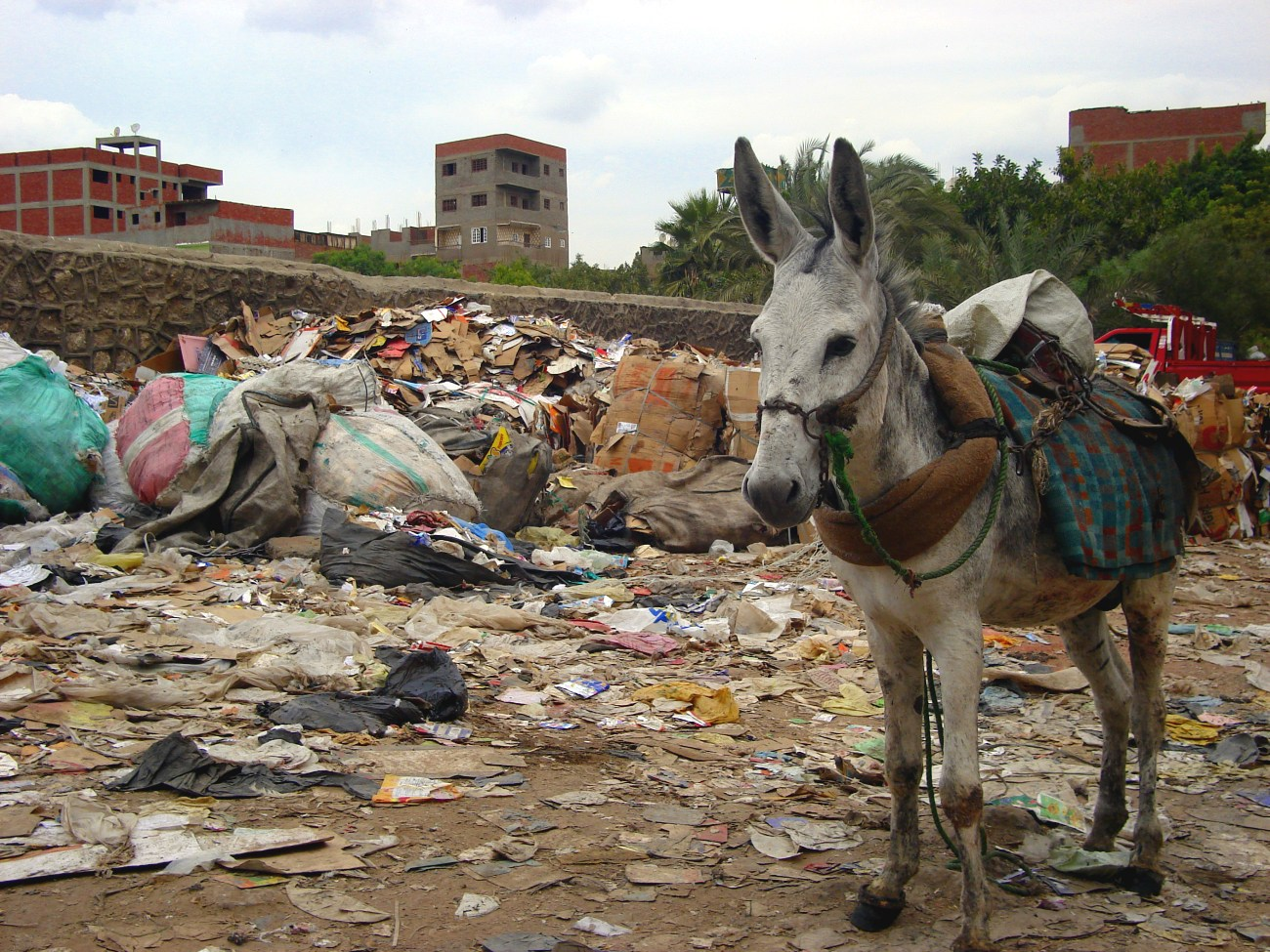
A donkey at Mokattam Hill in Cairo

Second, the Zabbaleen collect the garbage on donkey-pulled carts, separate out recyclables, breed pigs to recycle organic waste, and engage in the process of recycling, whereas the Wahiya do not. The Zabbaleen also sell the sorted secondary materials such as paper, tin, glass, plastic materials, rags, and aluminum cans to intermediaries. Because Cairenes are generally not aware of the distinction between the Wahiya and the Zabbaleen (also called zarraba), they tend to refer to both groups as Zabbaleen. It should be noted, however, that these two groups are distinct, serving different functions in the informal economy of collecting Cairo's municipal solid waste (MSW).

In response to government pressures to upgrade and modernize the refuse collection system, the Wahiya and the Zabbaleen made an agreement which resulted in the establishment of the Environmental Protection Company, a private-for-profit company, in 1989. Within the framework of the EPC, the Wahiya contracted groups of Zabbaleen to collect and dispose of MSW. The Wahiya continued to collect user fees from tenants, but now they also assumed the responsibility to cover hauling costs out of the fees they collected. The formation of the EPC officially established the Wahiya and the Zabbaleen as key participants in the collection of MSW, formalizing a relationship that had already existed for decades.

The municipal authorities grew increasingly intolerant of the Zabbaleen's donkey carts, which, according to Assaad, were considered an eyesore and a traffic hazard by the government. This was precisely in the neighborhoods that were being more fully served given Cairo's narrow, winding streets that are not wide enough for large garbage trucks. Regardless, in the early 1990s, the garbage collectors had to comply with the municipality's requirements to use motorized trucks, rather than donkey carts, as the authorities introduced a system of mechanization to transport solid waste. In the absence of government support, the Zabbaleen had to find ways to purchase the newly required motorized trucks themselves, and many resorted to credit loans, emptying their personal savings, or even selling small plots of land in their ancestral villages. Within the EPC, the Wahiya conducted administration, marketed the company's services, collected the fees from tenants, and supervised service deliveries. On the other end, the Zabbaleen, "many of whom might otherwise have been homeless and without employment, collected and transported the waste." In more recent years, as the Zabbaleen became more involved in the work, some received a minimal fee from the Wahiya.

== Notable people ==
- Yousriya Loza Sawiris: a Coptic businesswoman and wife of Onsi Sawiris, the patriarch of the Sawiris family, despite not being a part of the zabaleen community. She is considered by many the queen of the zabaleen neighbourhood and turned recycling in Cairo into a proper business, both expanding the operations and giving many zabbaleen job opportunities. She is married to Onsi Sawiris and mother of Naguib Sawiris and Samih Sawiris.

== Zabbaleen settlements ==
=== Main settlements ===
There are seven main settlements, in which the Zabbaleen reside in the Greater Cairo Urban Region: Ein El Sira, Moatamdia, El Bargil, Tora, Ezbet el Nakhl, Helwan, and Mokattam. Due to urban expansion, municipal authorities have moved most of these settlements to more peripheral locations. The number of Zabbaleen living in these areas total to about 60,000-70,000. Of these settlements, the largest is Mokattam, also often known as Garbage City, with approximately 20,000 inhabitants. It is located east of Cairo, situated at the foot of Mokattam mountain. Mokattam was created as a result of a series of evictions from the Imbaba area located in the Giza governorate, most notably when the Zabbaleen were given a four-day eviction notice from the governor of Giza in 1970.

Although Mokattam village is relatively close to the center of Cairo, it is not easily accessible from Cairo because it is situated on a plateau, and is surrounded by the cliffs of the Mokattam hills on one side and by the Manshiet Nasser squatter settlement on the other side. Vehicular access to the Zabbaleen Mokattam is possible only through three entrances, two of which are accessible only by crossing through the crowded, narrow, and steep streets of Manshiet Nasser. Because of the high congestion and road traffic, conflicts have often broken out between the residents of the Manshiet Nasser settlement and the Zabbaleen, who need to haul their donkey carts loaded with garbage through the streets of Manshiet Nasser. Occasionally, these conflicts have taken on religious overtones, as the inhabitants of the Manshiet Nasser settlement are mostly Muslims, whereas the inhabitants of the Mokattam settlement are mostly Coptic Christians.

Mokattam village is situated at the foot of the Mokattam mountains, which brings many environmental hazards. In 1993, a rockslide from Mokattam Mountain fell near the bordering area of the Zabbaleen settlement, resulting in the deaths of 40 people. In 2008, another rockslide from the Mokattam hills killed more than 100 people in El-Duweiqa, another shantytown in the Mokattam district. These rock slides brought public attention to the precarious location of shantytowns located below the Mokattam mountains, as well as to the Zabbaleen. Some attribute these frequent rock slides to various development and construction activities on Mokattam Mountain's upper plateau, on which the upper middle class residential district of Mokattam City is located.

=== Living conditions ===
The living conditions in Mokattam Village, and the other Zabbaleen settlements, are poor. In the 1970s, "the streets were so stacked with heaps of assorted refuse that some of them could not be located. The air was heavily polluted by the smoke generated from fires that were either lit deliberately to dispose of unwanted waste, or resulted from the spontaneous combustion of organic residues." There have been frequent fires in Mokattam, two of which were particularly severe and devastated the settlement in the 1970s.

In its early years, the Mokattam Settlement lacked basic services; there were no health centers, pharmacies, or schools. Basic amenities such as piped water, sewage networks, and electricity were also missing. During the beginning decades of the Mokattam settlement, the community suffered from "high mortality and morbidity rates (especially among children), poor environmental conditions, and low income." In 1983, the average household income per month was estimated at LE 70 (approximately US$11.50 in January 2005), within the lowest 10th percentile of national urban income levels, with an average large household size of 8 persons. However, the living conditions of the Mokattam settlement improved after the settlement received significant funding from international donors, including the World Bank's 1981 donation which was part of an upgrading program called the Zabbaleen Environmental Development Program (ZEDP).

=== Health ===
The Zabbaleen community is characterized by poor health and high rates of disease, especially those related to their garbage collecting activities. According to Assad, "reported infant mortality rates, particularly from tetanus, were extremely high. In 1981, infant mortality was estimated at about 240 deaths per thousand births (EQI Report #3, 1981: 36)." The infant mortality rate dropped to 117 per thousand in 1991, but the infant mortality rate in the Mokattam community is still substantially higher than the average infant mortality rate of Cairo for the 1990-95 period, which was 45.6 per thousand.

== Religion ==
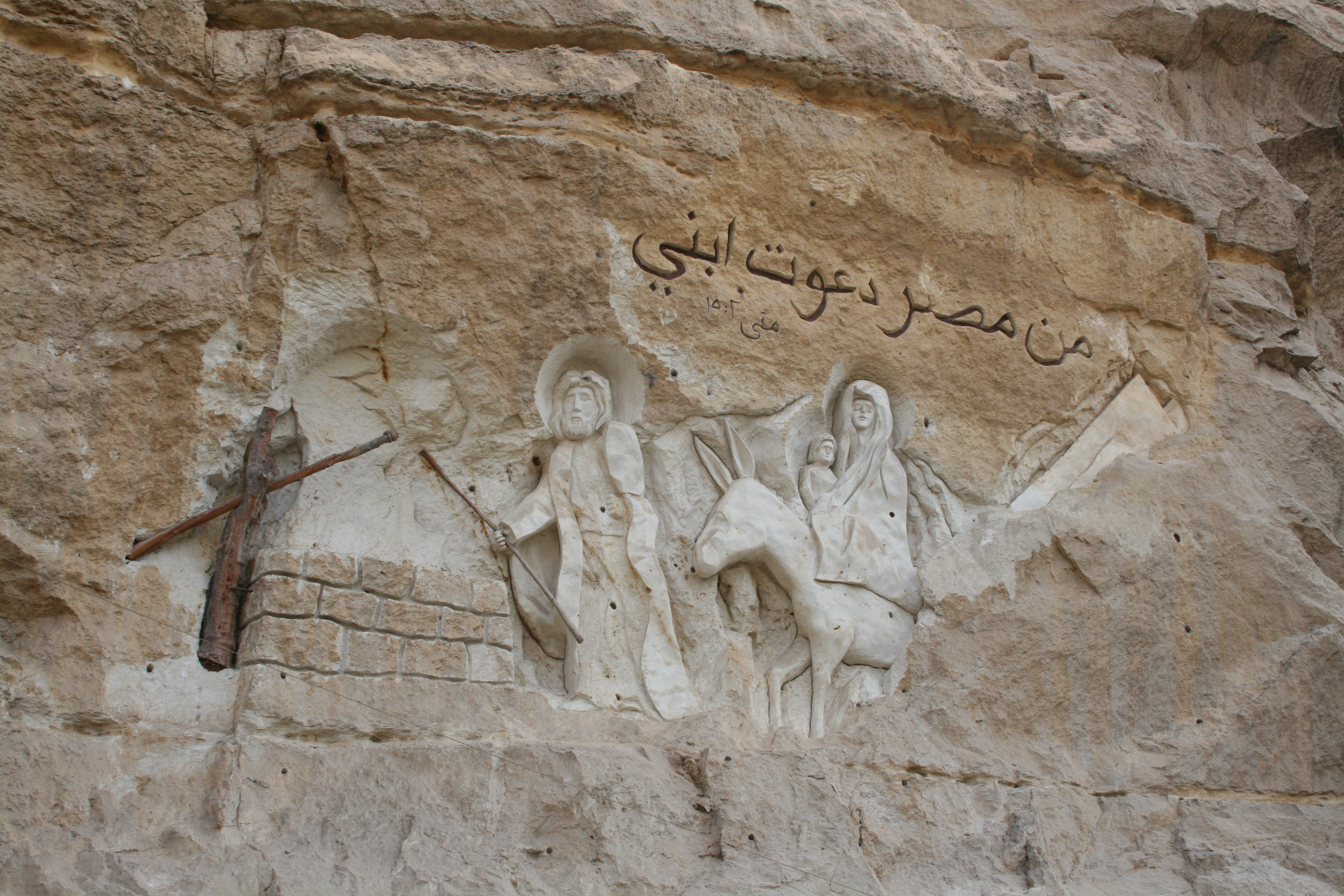
Church of Saint Simon, Muquattam, Cairo

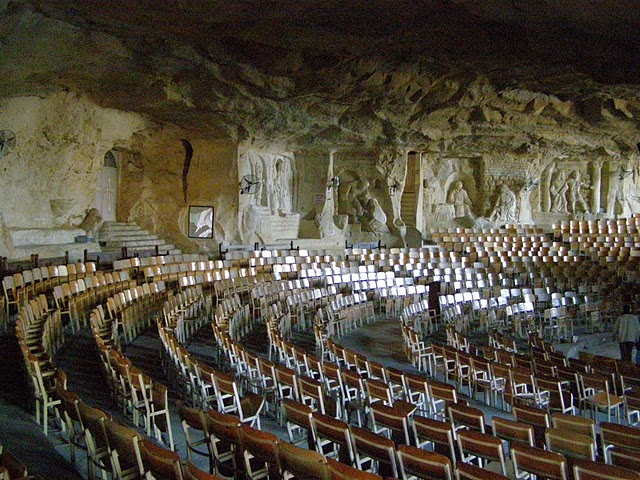
St. Simon the Tanner's Hall

Egypt is a Muslim-majority country. However, over 90 percent of the Zabbaleen community in the Mokattam village are Coptic Christians. Communities where almost everyone is Christian are rare to find in Egypt outside of the Zabbaleen community of Mokattam. According to Engi Wassef, in her commentary in her documentary film Marina of the Zabbaleen, many people in the Zabbaleen village say that even if they could live outside of the village or buy a house elsewhere, they would not because they are happy to live within their own religious community and freely practice their religion.

=== Cave church ===
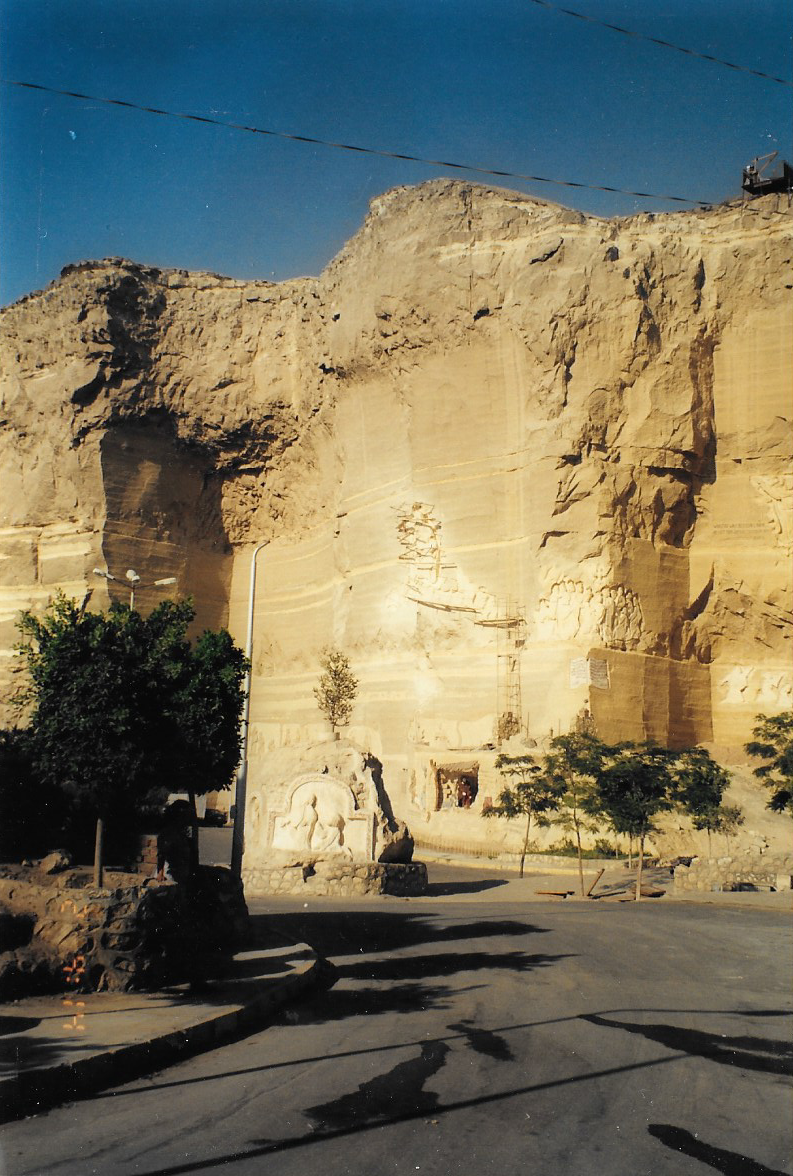
Cave church past Manshiyat Naser

The local Coptic church in Mokattam Village was established in 1975. After the establishment of the church, the Zabbaleen felt more secure in their location and only then began to use more permanent building materials, such as stone and bricks, for their homes. Given their previous experience of eviction from Giza in 1970, the Zabbaleen had lived in temporary tin huts up till that point. In 1976, a large fire broke out in Manshiyat Nasir, which led to the beginning of the construction of the first church below the Mokattam mountain on a site of 1,000 square meters. More churches have been built into the caves found in Mokattam. Currently, there are seven cave churches hidden among the caves of Mokattam Mountain. The Monastery of St. Simon the Tanner is the largest and it has an amphitheater with a seating capacity of 20,000. This church is the largest church in the Middle East and the largest religious building in Egypt. It is named after the Coptic saint, Simon the Tanner, who lived at the end of the 10th century, when Egypt was ruled by the Muslim Fatimid Caliph Al-Muizz Lideenillah. Simon the Tanner is the Coptic saint who is associated with the legend of the moving of the Mokattam Mountain. Adjacent churches to the Monastery of St. Simon the Tanner include St. Paul's Church, St. Mark's Church, and St. Simon the Tanner's Hall. The cave churches of Mokattam are also a point of interest for many tourists visiting Cairo.

== Zabbaleen recycling methods ==
Many sources state that the Zabbaleen have created one of the most efficient recycling systems in the world, which recycles up to 80 percent of all the waste that they collect. In contrast, most Western garbage collecting companies can only recycle about 20 to 25 percent of the waste that they collect. According to Fahmi, 2005, "it was estimated that, in 1997, the Zabbaleen informally handled one-third of the garbage of Cairo's 14 million people, mainly that from poorer districts," meaning that the Zabbaleen collected up to 3,000 tons of garbage every day. The Zabbaleen are able to recycle up to 80 percent of the waste that they collect through their family-run micro-enterprises that generate jobs, including those for production of handmade crafts from rags and paper, and incomes for some 40,000 people. In fact, according to Fahmi, "in the mid-1990s, nearly 700 Zabbaleen families owned collection enterprises, 200 owned and operated small- and medium-scale recycling enterprises, and 120 owned trading enterprises, in addition to maintenance workshops and community-based service businesses." What is distinctive about the Zabbaleen from many other urban informal waste collecting-groups that scavenge trash for useful products is that the Zabbaleen invest heavily in their tools and know-how for recycling. These Zabbaleen micro-entrepreneurs have invested "an estimated 2.1 million Egyptian pounds (LE) (US $ 1/4 LE 6.19 -May 2004 rates) in trucks, plastic granulators, paper compactors, cloth grinders, aluminium smelters, and tin processors." By investing in such infrastructure, the Zabbaleen continually upgraded and enhanced their methods of recycling plastic, paper, cardboard, glass, metal, and fabrics. Thus, the city of Cairo and its administration had been able to manage its solid waste at almost no cost to the municipal administration because of such efforts by the Zabbaleen. Hence, the income that the Zabbaleen generate is mainly derived from their recycling and sorting activities, not from the minimal fees (LE 2–4) that they collect from residents.

=== Trash collecting procedure ===
In the 2016 documentary "Zabbaleen: Trash Town" by Artyom Somov and Vitaly Buzuev, it is stated that each Zabbaleen family is assigned a section to collect garbage from and that they are not to stray from their assigned allotment. There is a gender division of labor in the process of collecting and sorting the trash in the Zabbaleen system. Usually, it is the Zabbaleen men, sometimes accompanied by children, who go pick up the trash door-to-door from each household. This trash is completely unsorted because there is not a system of recycling at the source in Egypt. It is rare for girls to go to collect the trash and it stops almost entirely after girls reach the age 10. The means of transportation that the Zabbaleen use to transport the trash that they collect are donkey-pulled carts and pickup trucks. After the Zabbaleen pick up the trash, they take the trash back to their village, a trip that may take anywhere from between 10 minutes to an hour.

=== Sorting ===
When the men return to the village with the collected trash, usually their families are waiting for them so that they can begin sorting the trash. The majority of those who sort the trash are women, while certain families specialize in sorting certain materials such as paper, plastic, aluminum, glass, etc. The women and children sort the garbage into 16 different types of trash and sort out the recyclables. The sorting of garbage is a time-consuming task in which women and children may spend up to 10 to 12 hours each day separating the garbage. First, the trash is sorted into the main 16 categories, such as paper, plastic, cardboard, cans, etc. So for example, all different types of paper are placed into one pile while all different types of plastic are placed in another pile. Sorting within categories does not take place until after the trash is sorted first into the major categories. For instance, the major category of paper would be sorted into white paper, yellow paper, thick paper, newspaper, thin paper, etc. Each sub-sorted material is then sold to factories and middlemen for a marginal profit.

=== Use of pigs ===
The initial and very integral step of sorting the trash is the responsibility of Zabbaleen community members who own pigs. The pigs are fed the organic waste. After the organic waste has been eaten by the pigs, the rest of the trash is sorted into different categories such as PT plastic, paper, cans, etc. Thus, as Engi Wassef, the director of Marina of the Zabbaleen notes, "One of the reasons why Coptic Christians are given a kind of monopoly status on the garbage collection and sorting system is because the Muslim religion does not allow for breeding or eating or living near pigs. It's considered a dirty animal."

In addition to their use in sorting out organic waste, pigs are an important source of income. After the pigs have grown, the Zabbaleen sell the pork to large tourist facilities and resorts. According to Fahmi and Sutton, "Hitherto, the Zabbaleen claimed to collect 6,000 tons of MSW a day, of which 60% was food waste and organic garbage which their pigs consume. Every 6 months, the waste collectors sell adult pigs, 5 to 15 pigs to a trader for LE 7 per kilogram (US$ 1.25 per kilogram). The trader then takes pigs to the slaughterhouses, where a kilogram is sold for LE 30–35 (US$ 5–6.25). The waste collectors can earn around LE 450 (US$ 80) per pig."

=== Creation of goods using recycled materials ===
After the sorting of materials is finished, the Zabbaleen sell the sorted materials, such as paper, tin, rags, plastic materials, cloth, etc. The Zabbaleen sell these sorted materials to factories that then reuse these products, such as paper, in the creation of new material. According to Engi Wassef, the director of the documentary film, Marina of the Zabbaleen, PT plastic, which is the plastic used to make plastic bottles for water and other beverages, is one of the most highly sought out materials. In the case of PT plastic, the Zabbaleen would even export this material to China. However, the simple re-sale of sorted materials is not the only activity that the Zabbaleen do in terms of re-using these materials. They also create new materials from the materials that they have sorted. For example, granulators are used to change regular opaque-colored plastic into small plastic pellets. From these plastic pellets, a variety of plastic product can then be made, including garbage bags and plastic hangers. Handmade crafts are also made from rags and paper. Thus, the Zabbaleen system is a multi-tier system that is not limited to the simple collection of waste but also encompasses the creation of new materials from found recyclables.

=== International recognition ===
The official website of the documentary Garbage Dreams states that, "Far ahead of any modern 'Green' initiatives, the Zabbaleen survive by recycling 80 percent of the garbage they collect." By comparison, most Western garbage collecting companies can only recycle about 20 to 25 percent of the waste that they collect. After the takeover of the municipal waste collection, the three private companies, two from Spain and one from Italy, that were awarded with contracts to dispose of Cairo's trash were only required to recycled 20 percent of the trash that they collect. The rest of the trash that foreign companies do not recycle are placed into new landfills. The efficiency and environmental friendliness of the Zabbaleen "waste collection and recycling system received major world recognition and approval at the Rio Earth Summit in 1992." The Mega-Cities Project sought to encourage the Zabbaleen system of waste collection and recycling as a model to be encouraged in other developing world cities such as Manila and Mumbai. The Zabbaleen waste collection system has received international funding from the World Bank, the Ford Foundation and Oxfam for specific projects to upgrade and improve the recycling of solid waste.

== Contracting out municipal waste collection ==
=== Selling of contracts to foreign companies ===
In 2003, the government of Egypt sold annual contracts reaching US$50 million to international companies to collect Cairo's solid waste. The three companies that were awarded with contracts for cleaning Cairo are Spanish companies Fomento de Construcciones y Contratas and Urbaser, Enser, and AMA, an Italian company. The Egyptian Company for Garbage Collection, a domestic company, was also awarded with contracts. There was a precedent for this approach to trash collection two years earlier, in 2001, when the government agreed to sign a contract with Onyx, a French company, to manage the waste of Alexandria, the second largest city in Egypt. Through this contract, the Egyptian government agreed to pay $446 million to Onyx for the treatment of one million tons of waste per year for 15 years, a sum that was ten times greater than what the government had previously paid before for its municipal waste management.

=== Impact on Cairo ===
Significantly, the foreign companies, despite the large value of their contracts, are only required to recycle 20 percent of the waste that they collect; the remaining 80 percent are placed into landfills. In contrast, the Zabbaleen recycle up to 80 percent of all the MSW that they collect. The foreign companies collected the trash from garbage bins placed at central collection points on the streets. However, many inhabitants of Cairo preferred the door-to-door garbage pick-up done by the Zabbaleen, especially because the bins were not plentifully located or located in inconvenient places. Thus, residents expressed their discontent with the new system, especially because they were being charged more for what seemed to be a more inconvenient system. Under the new system, residents were required to pay a monthly bill for garbage collection that accompanies their electricity bill. The garbage collection fee was based upon the percentage of each electricity bill so that the garbage collection fee increases proportionately to electricity consumption. Two years after the new system was imposed, Rashed writes in the Al-Ahram Weekly, "residents of the governorate have been voicing increasingly vociferous complaints that the companies are working well below full capacity. The streets are not as clean as they were during the first days of the privatisation. Both company workers, and garbage receptacles, appear to be increasingly thin on the ground."

=== Impact on Zabbaleen ===
The subcontracting of MSW collection to foreign companies had an immediate negative impact upon the Zabbaleen community as documented in Mai Iskander's film, Garbage Dreams. Contracting out MSW to foreign companies meant that the Zabbaleen would lose access to garbage, which was the basis of their recycling and sorting activities. In Garbage Dreams, Laila, a social worker in Mokattam Village, says, "The city contracted with foreign waste disposal companies because they perceived the Zabbaleen to be old-fashioned. But they didn't come tell us, "You need to modernize your ways." This was all done behind our backs: "we're replacing you with the companies." So we can be like the developed countries." In contrast, because officials from the Cairo Cleaning and Beautification Authority (CCBA) regarded the Zabbaleen recycling methods as unhygienic and backwards, they were optimistic about the process and hoped for a positive impact on Cairo's environment. However, because the mechanized equipment of the foreign companies are too large for the streets of Cairo, citizens were required to bring their trash to designated collection centers and bins, which were not always placed in easily accessible locations. Therefore, residents preferred to continue to have their trash picked up from their doors by the Zabbaleen, who were able to come directly to their doors even if their homes were located in narrow alleys. Eventually, the foreign companies realized that they needed the Zabbaleen and thus, subcontracted them. This system failed, however, because the companies underpaid the Zabbaleen. According to Fahmi and Sutton, "while company sources mention salaries ranging between LE 300 to LE 450 per month (US $50–$75), some Zabbaleen claim that the salaries on offer are actually closer to LE 150 per month." One Zabbal with eight children gave a similar figure: whereas he used to make LE 10 a day (US$1.60), foreign contractors offered him LE 5 a day.

== Pig cull ==
=== Government order ===
In April 2009, the first cases of the H1N1 influenza were found in Mexico. By the end of that month, it was estimated that up to 169 people died due to the epidemic. All of the deaths, except for one, occurred in Mexico. Egypt responded to this outbreak of H1N1 by ordering the culling of its swine population, an act which had a devastating impact on the livelihood of 70,000 Zabbaleen families. This decision was made not by the Health Ministry, but directly by the Parliament. International organizations, including the United Nations criticized the Egyptian government for its decision. Egypt was the only country in the world to take such a drastic decision as to cull an estimated 300,000 pigs. This decision was made despite the general agreement that H1N1 is not transmitted by pigs. Furthermore, there were no cases of swine flu found in Egypt during the time when the pig cull was executed. The actual slaughter of the pigs was ordered by the Egyptian Agricultural Ministry in April 2009. Although government authorities stated that the slaughtering itself was humane, and in accordance with Islamic law, witnesses testify a lot of cruelty and violence in the culling. According to Slackman, "Piglets were documented being stabbed and tossed into piles, large pigs beaten with metal rods, their carcasses dumped in the sand." Interviews conducted among those within the Zabbaleen communities of Mansheyet Nasser (Mokattam), Ard el Lewa, and Bulaq el Dakrour reported police beatings when protests against the culling would occur. H1N1 influenza was officially declared as a pandemic by the World Health Organization in June 2009. The pandemic was then declared to be officially over by the World Health Organization on August 10, 2010.

=== Explanations for the cull ===
When first ordering the pig cull, the Egyptian government asserted that it was a precaution to forestall national fears of the imminent pandemic. Later, after the pig cull, the government stated that its decision to order the pig cull was directly affected by the global breakout of H5N1 virus, more commonly known as bird flu, several years earlier and a fear that the two strains of viruses could possibly combine to form a more lethal virus. Later, the Egyptian government openly stated that the pig cull was no longer just an act to prevent swine flu; rather, it was part of a plan to clean up the Zabbaleen and allow them to live in sanitary conditions. According to Sabir Abdel Aziz Galal, chief of the infectious disease department in the Ministry of agriculture, "We want them to live a better life. humanely treated; it's a very difficult life." In contrast to the explanations officially given by the Egyptian government, many other observers, especially in the Western media, as well as the Zabbaleen themselves perceived a religious bias in the execution of the pig cull. In a New York Times article, Slackman asserted that, "The Zabbaleen are Christians. Egypt is a majority Muslim country. The Zabbaleen are convinced that the government wants to use the swine flu scare not to help improve their lives but to get pigs out of Egypt. Islam prohibits eating pork." In another New York Times article, Audi writes, "Most of Egypt's pig farmers are Christians, and some accuse the government of using swine flu fears to punish them economically." According to Rev. Samaan Ibrahim, a priest from a Zabbaleen neighborhood, "The bottom line is pigs are not welcome in Egypt." In an article by the BBC, Fraser argues along a similar line, saying that the Coptic Christian minority were targeted by the government for a main source of their income, the rearing of pigs. A similar opinion is voiced by Engi Wassef in her documentary, Marina of the Zabbaleen. Fahmi and Sutton echo a similar explanation: "The adverse effect of the slaughtering of the pigs on the Zabbaleen's livelihoods might be part of the ongoing gentrification of garbage city for land speculations and the taking over of their recycling economy by entrepreneurial businesses."

=== Effect on the Zabbaleen ===
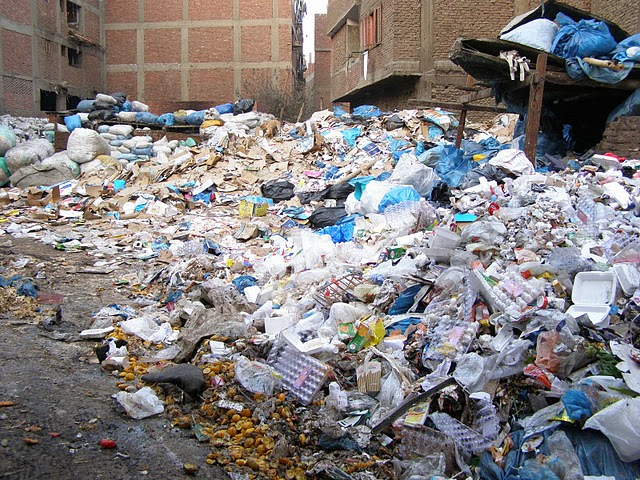
Increased trash on a street in Mokattam village after pig cull

The pig cull negatively affected the Zabbaleen in several ways. First, because the pigs eat the organic waste, they are a vital component in their recycling system, the pig cull literally destroyed the Zabbaleen recycling system. Deprived of their pig herds, the Zabbaleen stopped collecting such organic trash, leaving food piles to rot in the streets, leading to the increase of trash in the streets. According to Engi Wassef, recycling and sorting activities in the Zabbaleen villages all but ceased after the pig cull, because without the pigs, the sorting and recycling activities of the Zabbaleen became economically unfeasible. Less trash was brought into the village, because there was no place to put the trash. Hence, the entire recycling system was broken, placing the Zabbaleen out of work.

Another negative effect of the pig cull on the Zabbaleen was the loss of the economic value of the pigs themselves. According to Fahmi and Sutton, pigs are the main source of income for the Zabbaleen. Before the cull, the Zabbaleen had collected 6,000 tons of MSW daily, of which 60 percent was organic waste which was consumed by the pigs. Every six months, the Zabbaleen would take their pigs to traders, earning around 450LE (approximately US$80) per pig. Although the Egyptian government made financial compensations for some of pigs slaughtered; compensations were not given to all of the Zabbaleen who lost pigs to the cull and those who received compensation received far less money compared to what they would have received from selling the pigs to traders. According to one Zabbaleen pig breeder, "The government paid me between LE 50 (US$10) and LE 250 (US$50) for each pig I lost, depending on its size, whilst meat processors would have given me as much as LE 1,000 (US$200)." The pig cull also resulted in increased cases of malnutrition and anaemia in Zabbaleen children because prior to the cull, pork had been the only affordable source of animal protein for most of the Zabbaleen.

=== Effect on Cairo ===
Many observers noticed an immediate increase in piles of trash on the streets of Cairo after the pig cull. Because in the Zabbaleen system of recycling, it is the pigs who initially eat the organic waste, the pig cull had a negative effect on the cleanliness of Cairo's streets. According to Khalil in an article by Al Masry Al Youm, "The elimination of the pigs prompted more trash than usual to immediately start clogging the streets of the capital." In a New York Times article from September 2009, Slackman states that the Egyptian government was warned before its actual execution that the pig cull, if executed, "the city would be overwhelmed with trash." Slackman notes that after the pig cull, "rotting food piles up on the streets of middle-class neighborhoods like Heliopolis and in the poor streets of communities like Imbaba." In an article by Bloomberg, Williams also observes a garbage crisis piling up on the streets of Cairo after the pig cull. This piling up of organic MSW became hazardous because the organic waste then became a source of infectious diseases and led to an increase of rat infestation.

== See also ==
- Waste management in Egypt
