= Ezbet Bekhit =

Community in Cairo, Egypt

Ezbet Bekhit (Bekheit hamlet) is a self-built community located in the Manshiyat Naser district in Cairo, Egypt. As of 2003, it has a population of 37,000. On September 6, 2008, over 100 residents were killed, and thousands displaced due to the Duweika Rockslide.
