= Maqaduniya =

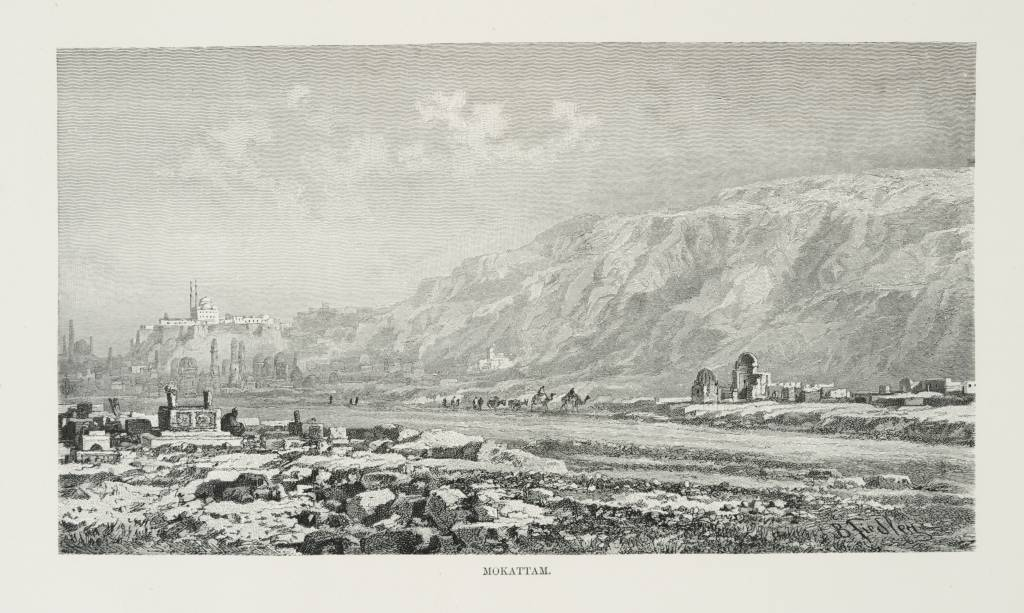
Mokattam Hills near Cairo

Maqaduniya (Arabic: مقدونية) is a region in Medieval Egypt comprising Fustat, Ain Shams, Giza and Memphis.

== Name ==
It is unknown if Egyptian Maqaduniya is related to Balkan region of the same name.

Yaqut al-Hamawi in his Kitāb Mu'jam al-Buldān says:

"Maqaduniya is the name of Misr in Ancient Greek."

Paul Casanova connects Maqaduniya to one of the Ancient Egyptian names of Memphis – Makha-to-ui (Ancient Egyptian: Mḫꜣ.t-Tꜣ.wy, lit. 'Scales of the Two Lands', reconstructed pronunciation: møʔχəˈtoːw).

It could be also related to the name of Mokattam Hills which Casanova derives from a denomination of the compound Heliopolite deity (Hor)-em-akhet-Atum (Horus of the Horizon–Atum), the compound which is also present in one of the Sphinx's names – Harmachis (Coptic: ϩⲁⲣⲙⲁϣⲓ Harmashi).
