= Garbage Dreams =

2009 film

- Directed by: Mai Iskander
- Produced by: Mai Iskander
- Cinematography: Mai Iskander
- Release dates: April 3, 2009 (Phoenix); July 31, 2009 (United States)
- Running time: 79 minutes
- Country: United States
- Languages: English; Egyptian Arabic

Garbage Dreams is a 2009 feature length documentary film produced and directed by Mai Iskander. Filmed over the course of four years, Garbage Dreams follows three teenage boys growing up in Egypt's garbage village. Garbage Dreams aired on the PBS program Independent Lens for the occasion of Earth Day 2010 and has been screened at international film festivals.

== Synopsis ==
Garbage Dreams follows three teenage boys born into the trash trade and growing up in the world's largest garbage village, on the outskirts of Cairo, Egypt. It is the home to 60,000 Zaballeen, also spelled "Zabbaleen" as Arabic for "garbage people." Far ahead of any modern "Green" initiatives, the Zaballeen survive by recycling 80 percent of the garbage they collect. When their community is suddenly faced with the globalization of its trade, each of the teenage boys is forced to make choices that will impact his future and the survival of his community.

== Release ==
Garbage Dreams premiered at the 2009 SXSW Film Festival, where it ran in the US Documentary Competition Garbage Dreams had its international premiere in Europe at the twenty-second International Documentary Film Festival Amsterdam and its Middle Eastern premiere at the Dubai International Film Festival.

Garbage Dreams was shortlisted for the 2010 Academy Awards in the category of Best Feature Length Documentary, was nominated for the 2010 Best Documentary by the Directors Guild of America, and has won 26 international awards including the Al Gore Reel Current Award and IDA Humanitas Award.

Garbage Dreams aired on PBS Independent Lens for the occasion of Earth Day 2010. It has been screened in over 100 international film festivals, including the Woodstock Film Festival, the Hollywood Film Festival, the Bel Air Film Festival, Maryland Film Festival, and the Seattle International Film Festival.

== Critical reception ==
Former U.S. Vice President Al Gore presented the 2009 REEL Current Award to the documentary Garbage Dreams at the Nashville Film Festival. He said of the film, "Garbage Dreams is a moving story of young men searching for a ways to eke out a living for their families and facing tough choices as they try to do the right thing for the planet."

In Variety Ronnie Scheib called the film "Stunning debut ... [Iskander's] lensing grants her subjects immense dignity (they never appear "other" in their poverty) and her film its curious beauty."

In her review in The New York Times, Jeannette Catsoulis said "Expertly weaving personal fears, family tensions and political action, 'Garbage Dreams' records the tremblings of a culture at a crossroads."

In The Hollywood Reporter Frank Scheck wrote "Championed by Oscar winner Al Gore and the spur for a million-dollar donation by the Bill and Melinda Gates Foundation, Garbage Dreams could ride its sociological importance to Oscar recognition."

In The Village Voice Andrew Schenker called Garbage Dreams a "handsomely shot and intermittently fascinating look at Cairo's Zaballeen community."

== Awards ==
- Al Gore REEL Current Award 2009 (winner) at the Nashville Film Festival
- Humanitas Award 2009 (winner) at the International Documentary Association Documentary Awards
- Best Documentary 2009 (winner) at the Bermuda International Film Festival
- Best Documentary 2009 (winner) at the Vail Film Festival
- World Cinema Audience Award 2009 (winner) at the Phoenix Film Festival
- Shortlisted for Academy Award Documentary Feature 2009

== See also ==
- Marina of the Zabbaleen
