= Mokattam =

Urban district in Cairo, Egypt

Coordinates: 30.02°N 31.30°E

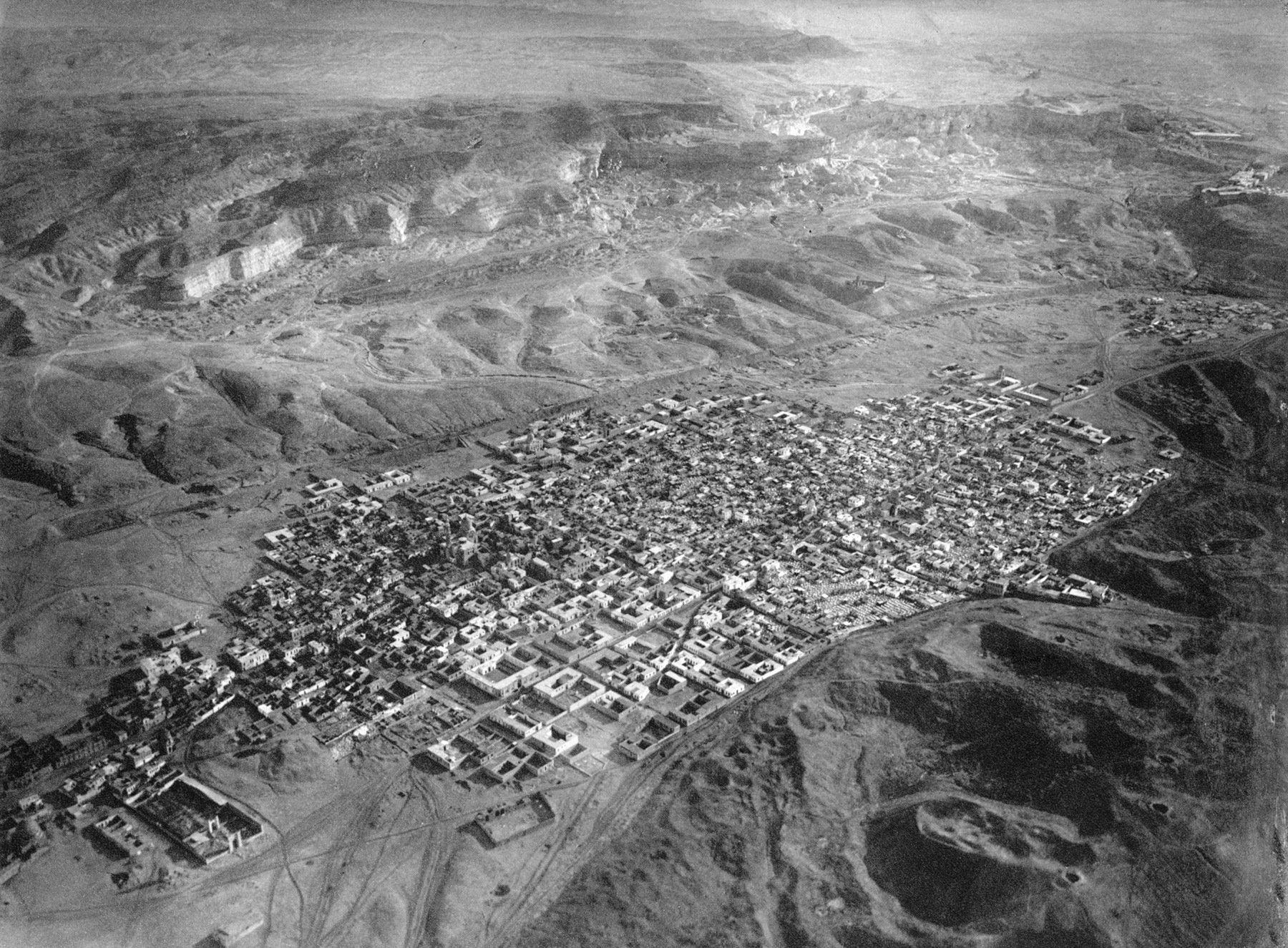
Mokattam (upper area), above the City of the Dead—Cairo necropolis, in a 1904 aerial view by Eduard Spelterini from a hot air balloon.

The area, seen in 2017.

The Mokattam (Arabic: المقطم [elmoˈʔɑtˤ.tˤɑm], also spelled Muqattam), also known as the Mukattam Mountain or Hills, is the name of an Eastern Desert plateau as well as the district built over it in the Southern Area of Cairo, Egypt.

== Etymology ==
The Arabic name Mokattam means cut off or broken off and apparently refers to how the low range of hills is divided into three sections. Paul Casanova advocated the idea that it is a corruption of an older name Maqaduniya (Arabic: مقدونية), mentioned in Medieval Arabic sources, which he derives from Makhetow (Ancient Egyptian: Mḫꜣ.t-Tꜣ.wy, lit. 'Scales of the Two Lands'), one of the names of Memphis.

== Landform ==
The Mokattam Formation, named after the hills, outcrops throughout the plateau. The highest segment is a low mountain landform called Moqattam Mountain. In the past the exposed Mokattam Formation was an important ancient Egyptian quarry site for limestone, used in the construction of temples and pyramids.

== Settlement ==
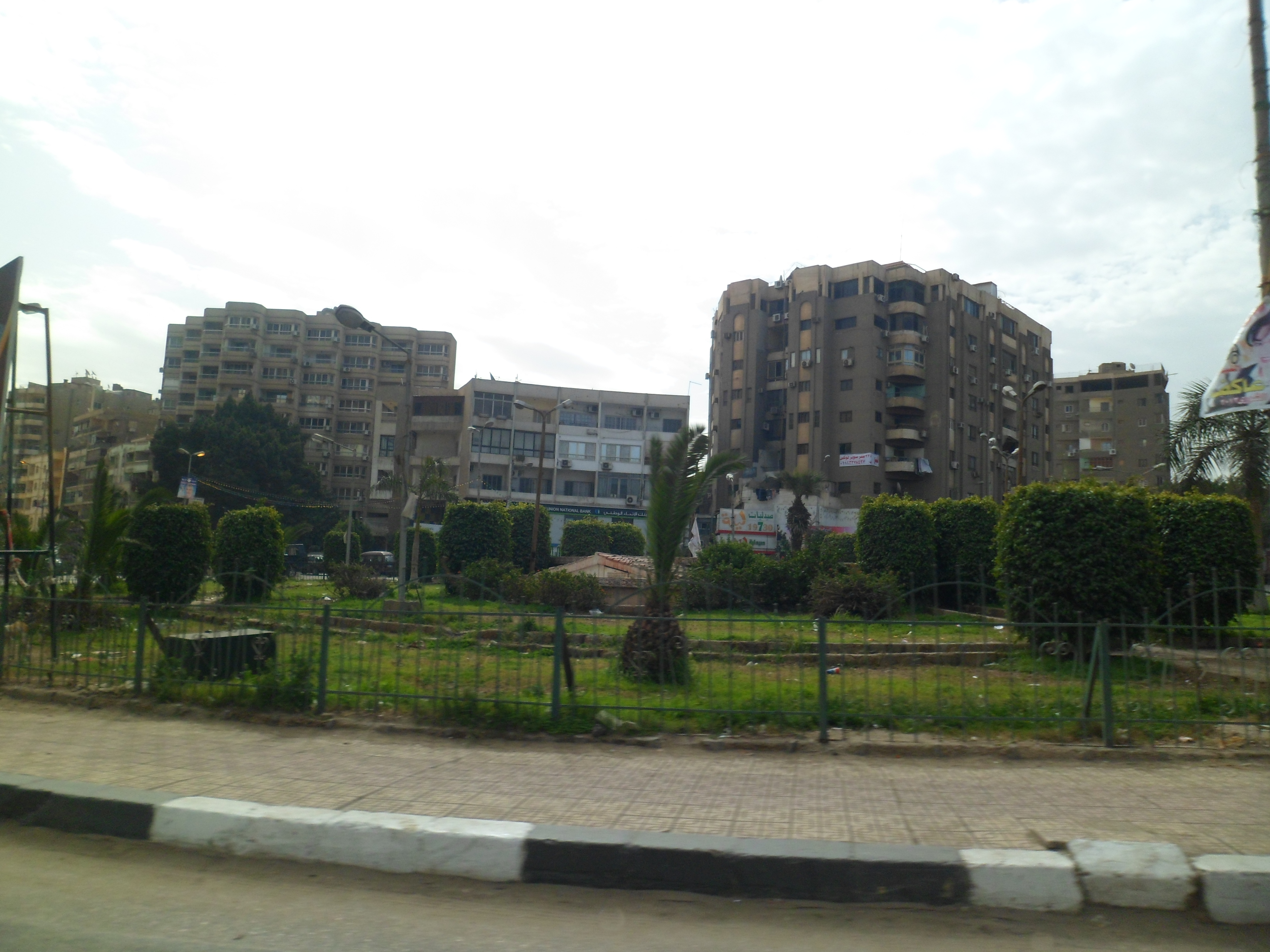
Nafoura Square-Mokattam

The hills are in the region of ancient Fustat, the new capital founded by Amr ibn al-As after the Muslim conquest of Egypt in 642 CE. The Zabbaleen people, who are an integral part of collecting and processing Cairo's municipal solid waste, live in Manshiyat Naser, Garbage City, at the foot of the Mokattam Hills.

EMAAR Misr, the Egyptian subsidiary of the Dubai-based real estate organization Emaar Properties built Uptown Cairo in Mokattam.

== Municipal district and population ==
The Moqattam district lies in the Southern Area of Cairo, Egypt. In 2017, it had 224,138 residents in its 10 shiakhas:

Shiakha	Code 2017	Population
`Abd, al-	011210	13,792
Aḥyâ'	011202	24,202
Aṭlas C	011209	39,191
Jîza (Gizeh)	011205	15,361
Mukaṭṭam	011201	19,426
Naṣr al-	011203	9,903
Sab`în Faddân, al-	011207	47,943
Sharq li-l-Ta'mîn, al-	011204	19,743
Subḥî Ḥusayn	011208	19,389
Ṣa`îd, al-	011206	15,188

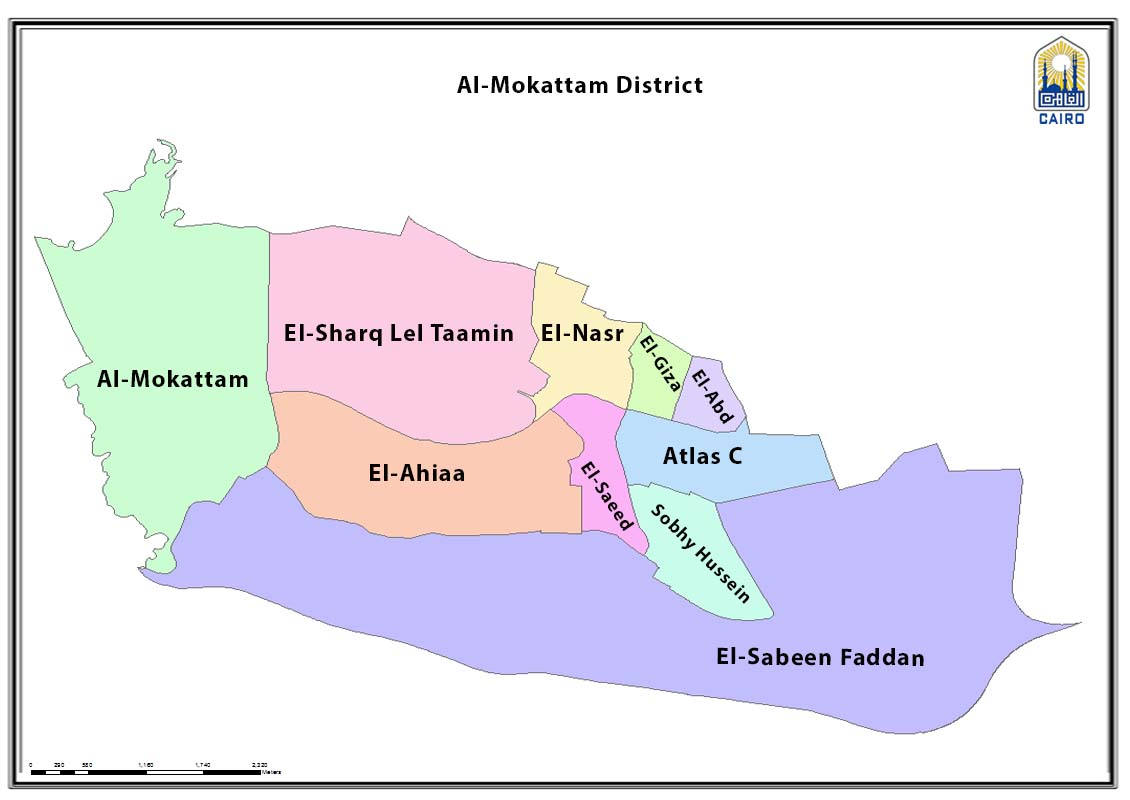
Mokattam district map, Cairo

== Sports ==
In Mokkattam, like other places in Cairo, the locals support either Al Ahly SC or El Zamalek, yet Mokkattam itself has a football team that plays in the Egyptian third division called Misr Insurance (Masr Le El Tammeen). Moreover, the top division club Al Mokawloon Al Arab SC actually lies on the border of the Mokkattam mountain.

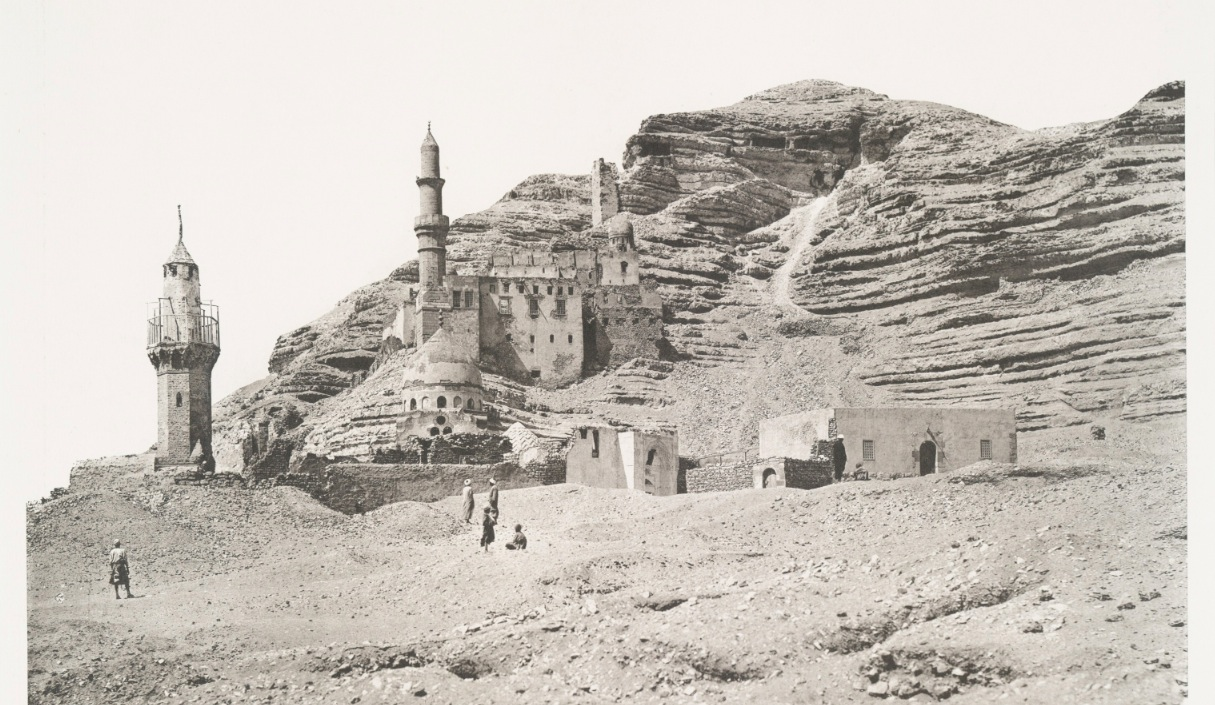
An example of the integration of architecture into the landscape c.1887

== Simon the Tanner ==
Mokattam is widely known in the Coptic Church, as it is believed that the mountain has moved up and down when the Coptic Pope Abraham of Alexandria, following the advice of Saint Simon the Tanner, performed a mass near it in order to prove to the Caliph that the Gospel is true when it says that "if one has faith like a grain of mustard one can move a mountain". The name "Broken-off Mountain" may be related to the fact that in the story the mountain breaks off from the underlying rock and rises up, before coming back down again.

== See also ==
- Maqaduniya, a region of Medieval Egypt
- City of the Dead, Islamic necropolis and cemetery
- List of types of limestone, ancient Egyptians quarried limestone in the hills
- Sayyidah Zainab District
