= Makuria =

Medieval kingdom in Lower Nubia

Coordinates: 18°13′28″N 30°44′33″E

Kingdom of Makuria ⲇⲱⲧⲁⲩⲟ (Old Nubian) Dotawo Μακουρία (Greek) Makouria المقرة (Arabic) al-Muqurra
- 5th century–late 15th century
- Alleged flag of Makuria according to the Book of Knowledge of All Kingdoms (c. 1350)

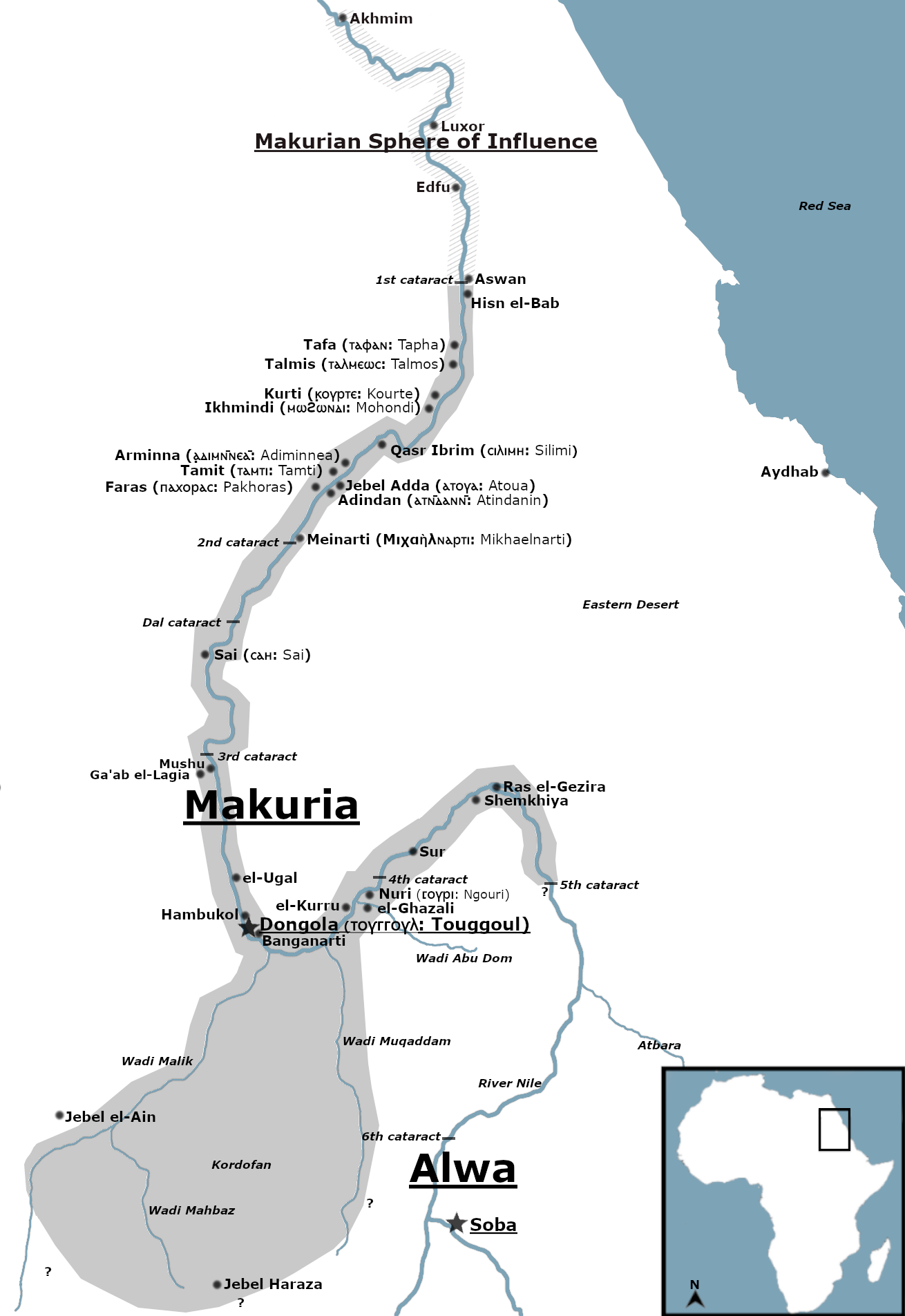
- Makuria at the end of the 10th century
- Capital: Dongola (5th century – 1365); Gebel Adda (after 1365)
- Common languages: Nubian; Greek (ecclesiastical); Coptic (until 11th century); Arabic (diplomacy & trade with Egypt)
- Religion: Animism (until mid-6th century): Greek Orthodox (mid-6th century – c. 7th century); Coptic Orthodox (after c. 7th century)
- Government: Monarchy
- King
  - fl. 651–652: Qalidurut (first known king)
  - fl. 1463: Joel (last known king)
- History
  - Established: 5th century
  - Disintegration: 1365
  - Disestablished: late 15th century
- Currency: Gold
Preceded by	Succeeded by
Kingdom of Kush	Banu Kanz; Funj Sultanate
- Today part of: Sudan; Egypt

Makuria (Old Nubian: ⲇⲱⲧⲁⲩⲟ, Dotawo; Greek: Μακουρία, romanized: Makouria; Arabic: المقرة, romanized: al-Muqurra) was a medieval Nubian kingdom in what is today northern Sudan and southern Egypt. Its capital was Dongola (Old Nubian: ⲧⲟⲩⲅⲅⲟⲩⲗ, Touggoul) in the Dongola Reach, about halfway between the 3rd and 4th Nile cataract.

Coming into being after the collapse of the Kingdom of Kush in the 4th century, it originally covered the Nile Valley from the 3rd cataract to somewhere south of Abu Hamed at Mograt Island. The capital of Dongola was founded around 500 and soon after, in the mid-6th century, Makuria converted to Christianity. Probably in the early 7th century Makuria annexed its northern neighbour Nobatia, now sharing a border with Byzantine Egypt.

In 652 a Rashidun Arab army invaded and besieged Dongola, but was repulsed. Both sides signed the Baqt treaty which would ensure largely uninterrupted peace between Egypt and Makuria until the 13th century. The period from the 9th to 11th century saw the peak of Makuria's cultural development resulting in the construction of buildings like the Throne Hall of Dongola, the great cruciform church of Dongola, and the Banganarti monastery, alongside the development of arts such as wall paintings and finely crafted and decorated pottery. Nubian became increasingly important as written language, but Coptic, Greek and Arabic are also recorded. Makuria maintained close dynastic ties with the fellow Nubian kingdom of Alodia to the south and expanded into northern Kordofan, while also exterting a limited political and cultural influence in Upper Egypt as far north as Akhmim.

Increased aggression from Mamluk Egypt, internal discord, Bedouin incursions and possibly the plague and the shift of trade routes led to the state's decline in the 13th and 14th century. In the 1310s and 1320s it was briefly ruled by Muslim kings. Due to a civil war in 1365, the kingdom was reduced to a rump state that lost much of its southern territories, including Dongola. The last recorded king, probably residing in Gebel Adda, lived about 1460. Makuria probably collapsed soon after, in the late 15th century. In the 1560s the Ottomans occupied Lower Nubia, while the former Makurian territories south of the 3rd cataract, including Dongola, had been annexed by the Islamic Funj Sultanate by the early 16th century.

== Sources ==
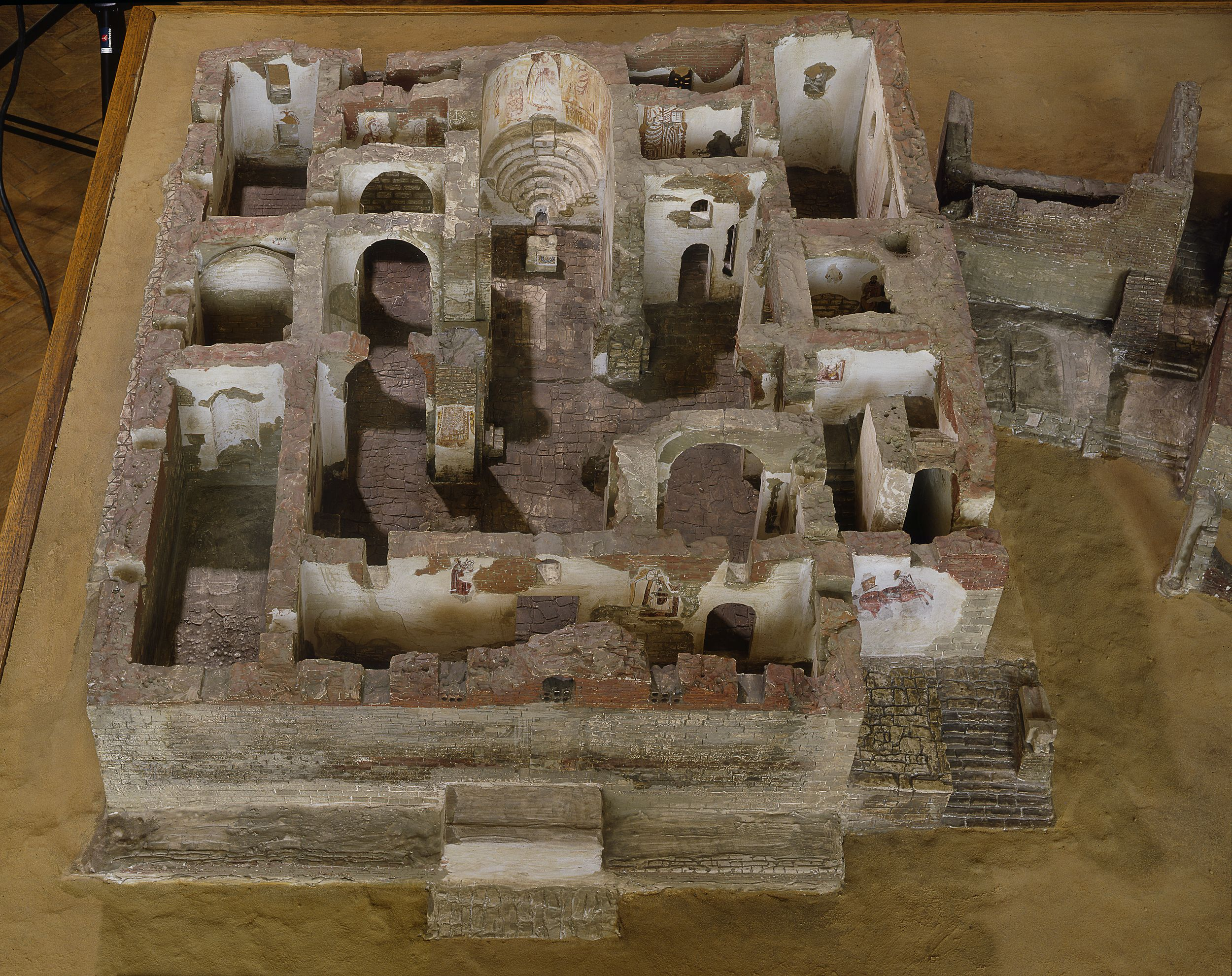
A model of the Faras Cathedral at the state of its excavation in the early 1960s. The rediscovery of the church and its magnificent paintings revolutionized the knowledge of Christian Nubia.

Makuria is much better known than its neighbor Alodia to the south, but there are still many gaps in our knowledge. The most important source for the history of the area is various Arab travelers and historians who passed through Nubia during this period. These accounts are often problematic as many of the Arab writers were biased against their Christian neighbors. These works generally focus on only the military conflicts between Egypt and Nubia. One exception is Ibn Selim el-Aswani, an Egyptian diplomat who traveled to Dongola when Makuria was at the height of its power in the 10th century and left a detailed account.

The Nubians were a literate society, and a fair body of writing survives from the period. These documents were written in the Old Nubian language in an uncial variety of the Greek alphabet extended with some Coptic symbols and some symbols unique to Nubian. Written in a language that is closely related to the modern Nobiin tongue, these documents have long been deciphered. However, the vast majority of them are works dealing with religion or legal records that are of little use to historians. The largest known collection, found at Qasr Ibrim, does contain some valuable governmental records.

The construction of the Aswan High Dam in 1964 threatened to flood what had once been the northern half of Makuria. In 1960, UNESCO launched a massive effort to do as much archaeological work as possible before the flooding occurred. Thousands of experts were brought from around the world over the next few years. Some of the more important Makurian sites looked at were the city of Faras and its cathedral, excavated by a team from Poland; the British work at Qasr Ibrim; and the University of Ghana's work at the town of Debeira West, which gave important information on daily life in medieval Nubia. All of these sites are in what was Nobatia; the only major archaeological site in Makuria itself is the partial exploration of the capital at Old Dongola.

== History ==
=== Early period (5th–8th century) ===
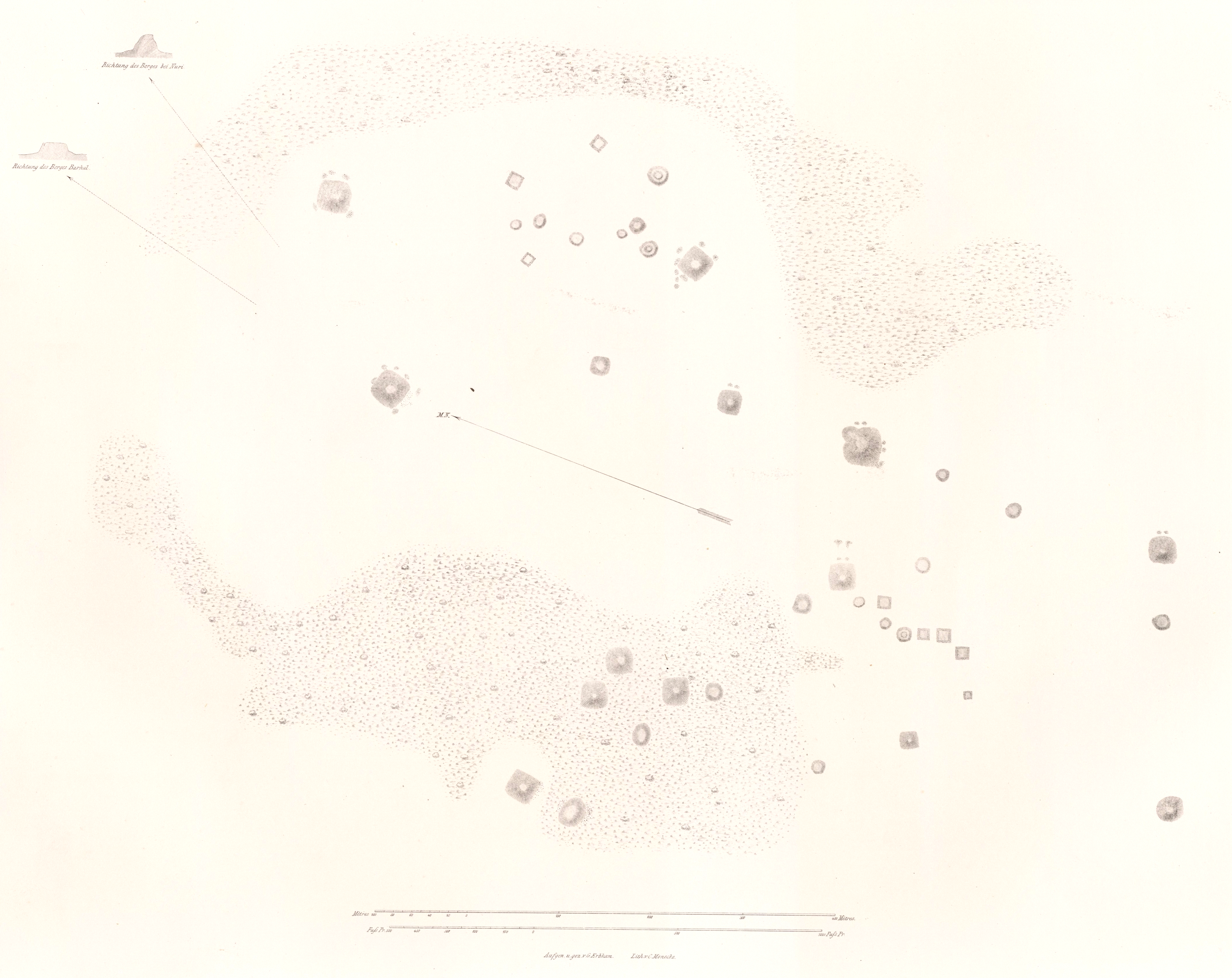
19th century ground plan of the tumulus field of Tanqasi (late 3rd—first half of the 6th century). Since then, many new tumuli have been noted there, although most of them still await excavation.

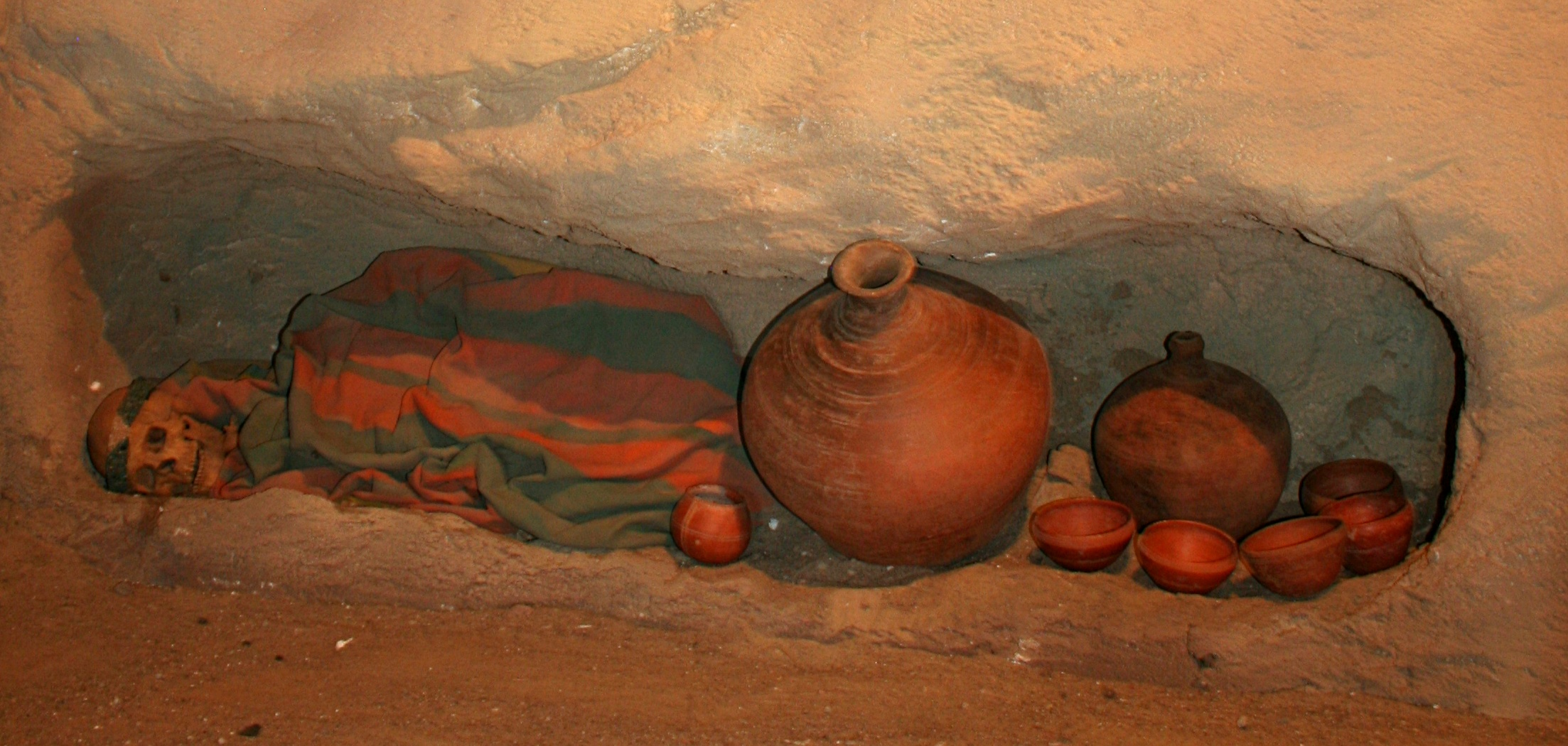
Burial within a tumulus of the tumulus field of Kassinger Bahri (second half of the 4th century–early 6th century)

By the early 4th century, if not before, the Kingdom of Kush with its capital Meroe was collapsing. The region which would later constitute Makuria, i.e. the Nile Valley between the third Nile cataract and the great Nile bend of the fourth/fifth cataract, has been proposed to have seceded from Kush already in the 3rd century. Here, a homogenous and relatively isolated culture dubbed as "pre-Makuria" developed. During the 4th and 5th centuries, the region of Napata, located near the fourth cataract and formerly being one of the most important political and sacred places of Kush, served as the center for a new regional elite buried in large tumuli like those at el Zuma or Tanqasi. There was a significant population growth accompanied by social transformations. As a result, the Kushites were absorbed into the Nubians, a people originally from Kordofan that had settled in the Nile Valley in the 4th century AD. Thus, a new Makurian society and state emerged by the 5th century. In the late 5th century one of the first Makurian kings moved the power base of the still-developing kingdom from Napata to further downstream, where the fortress of Dongola, the new seat of the royal court, was founded and which soon developed a vast urban district. Many more fortresses were built along the banks of the Nile, probably not intended to serve a military purpose, but to foster urbanization.

Already at the time of the foundation of Dongola contacts were maintained with the Byzantine Empire. In the 530s, the Byzantines under Emperor Justinian mounted a policy of expansion. The Nubians were part of his plan to win allies against the Sasanian Persians by converting them to Christianity, the Byzantine state religion. The imperial court, however, was divided in two sects, believing in two different natures of Jesus Christ: Justinian belonged to the Chalcedonians, the official denomination of the empire, while his wife Theodora was a Miaphysite, who were the strongest in Egypt. John of Ephesus described how two competing missions were sent to Nubia, with the Miaphysite arriving first in, and converting, the northern kingdom of Nobatia in 543. While the Nobatian king refused Justinian's mission to travel further south archaeological records might suggest that Makuria converted still in the first half of the 6th century. The chronicler John of Biclar recorded that in around 568 Makuria had “received the faith of Christ”. In 573 a Makurian delegation arrived in Constantinople, offering ivory and a giraffe and declaring its good relationship with the Byzantines. Unlike Nobatia in the north (with which Makuria seemed to have been in enmity) and Alodia in the south Makuria embraced the Chalcedonian doctrine. The early ecclesiastical architecture at Dongola confirms the close relations maintained with the empire, trade between the two states was flourishing.

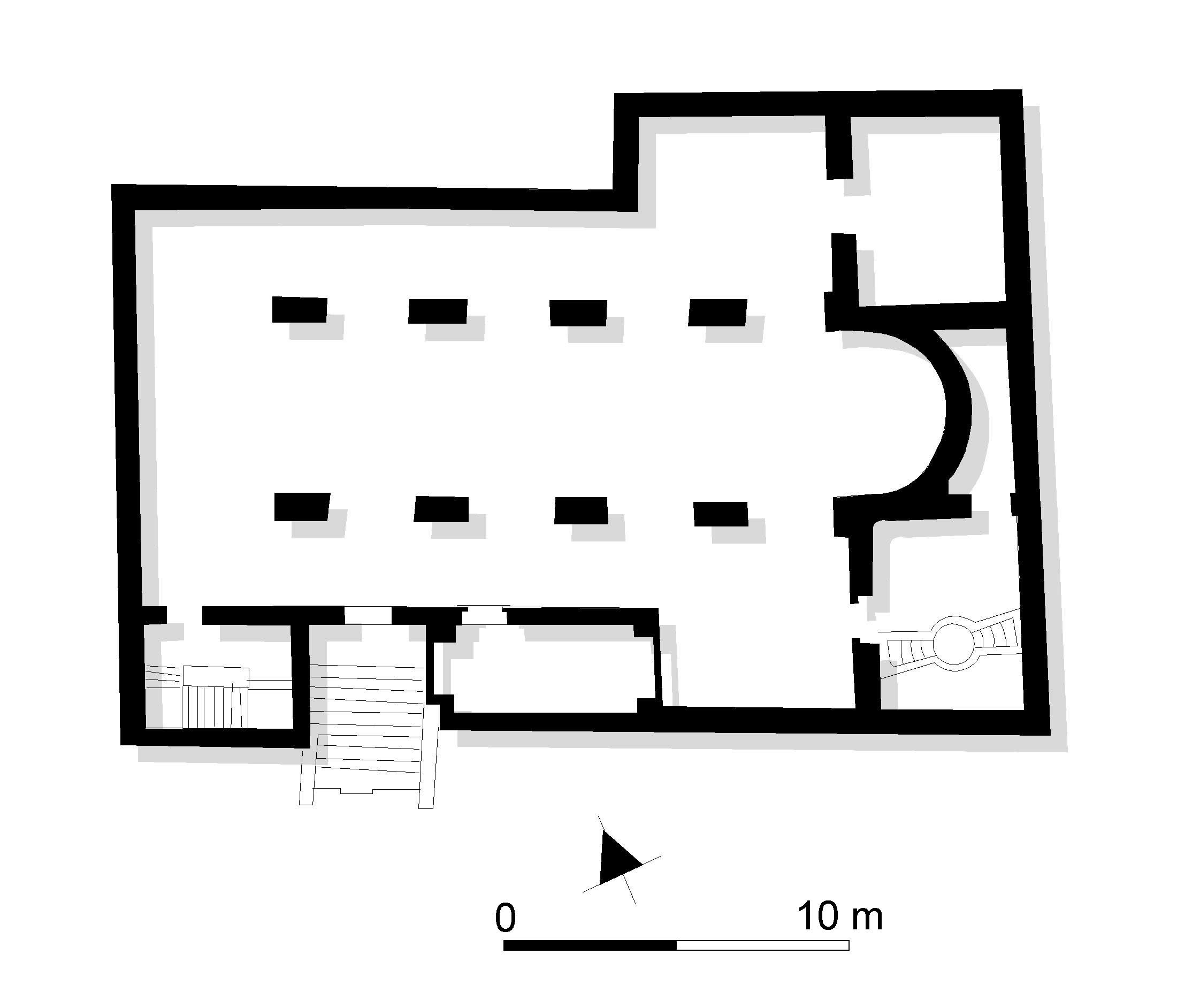
Ground plan of the "Old Church" in Dongola, founded in the mid-6th century

In the 7th century, Makuria annexed its northern neighbour Nobatia. While there are several contradicting theories, (Note: Theory I places that event at the time of the Sasanian invasion, theory II at the time between the first and second Arab invasion, i.e. 642 and 652, and the third at the turn of the seventh century.) it seems likely that this occurred soon after the Sasanian occupation of Egypt, presumably during the 620s, but before 642. Before the Sasanian invasion, Nobatia used to have strong ties with Egypt and was thus hit hard by its fall. Perhaps it was also invaded by the Sasanians itself: some local churches from that period show traces of destruction and subsequent rebuilding. Thus weakened, Nobatia fell to Makuria, making Makuria extend as far north as Philae near the first cataract. A new bishopric was founded in Faras in around 630 (Note: It has also been argued that the bishopric was not founded, but merely reestablished.) and two new cathedrals styled after the basilica of Dongola were built in Faras and Qasr Ibrim. It is not known what happened to the royal Nobatian family after the unification, but it is recorded that Nobatia remained a separate entity within the unified kingdom governed by an Eparch.

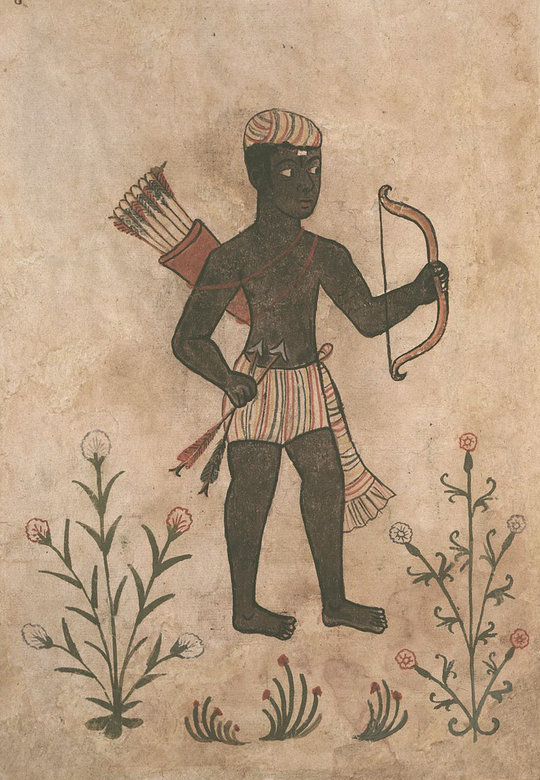
A Nubian archer on a Portuguese manuscript from the 16th century

Between 639 and 641 the Muslim Arabs overran Byzantine Egypt. A Byzantine request for help remained unanswered by the Nubians due to conflicts with the Beja. In 641 or 642 the Arabs sent a first expedition into Makuria. While it is not clear how far south (Note: Recently it has been suggested that the Arabs fought the Nubians not in Nubia, but in Upper Egypt, which remained a battle zone contested by both parties until the Arab conquest of Aswan in 652.) it penetrated, it was eventually defeated. A second invasion led by Abd Allah ibn Sa'd ibn Abi al-Sarh followed in 651/652, when the attackers pushed as far south as Dongola. Dongola was besieged and bombarded by catapults. While they damaged parts of the town they could not penetrate the walls of the citadel. Muslim sources highlight the skill of the Nubian archers in repelling the invasion. With both sides being unable to decide the battle in their favour, Abi Sarh and the Makurian king Qalidurut eventually met and drew up a treaty known as Baqt. Initially it was a ceasefire also containing an annual exchange of goods (Makurian slaves for Egyptian wheat, textiles etc.), an exchange typical for historical North East African states and perhaps being a continuation of terms already existing between the Nubians and Byzantines. Probably in Umayyad times the treaty was expanded by regulating the safety of Nubians in Egypt and Muslims in Makuria. While some modern scholars view the Baqt as a submission of Makuria to the Muslims it is clear that it was not: the exchanged goods were of equal value and Makuria was recognized as an independent state, being one of the few to beat back the Arabs during the early Islamic expansion. The Baqt would remain in force for more than six centuries, although at times interrupted by mutual raids.

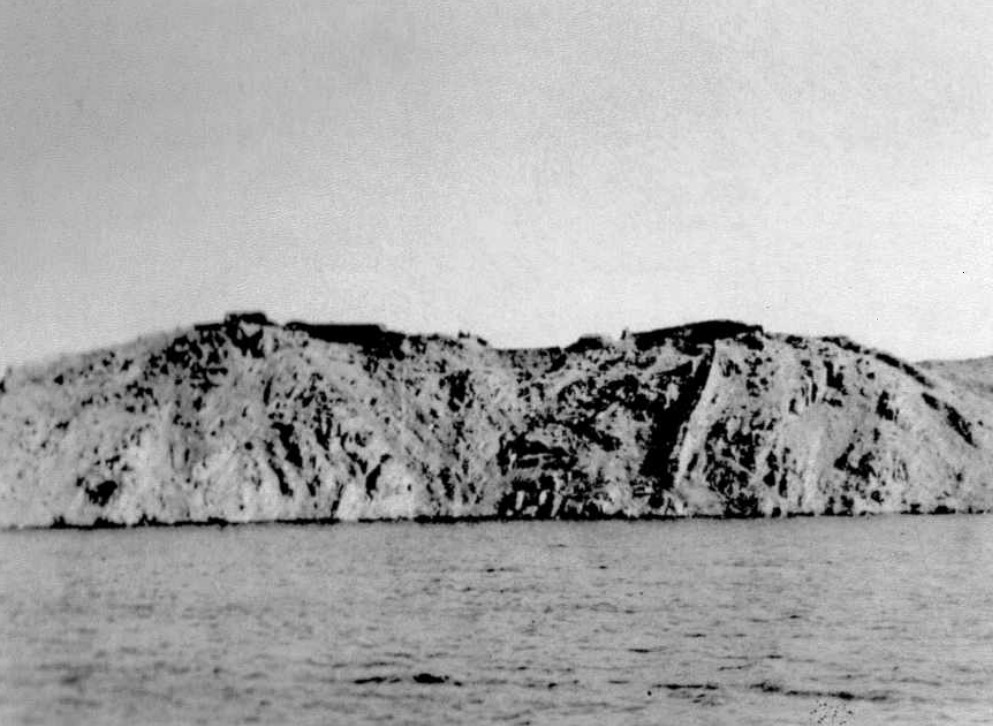
The Hisn el-Bab castle opposite of (now submerged) Philae Island at the southern end of the First Nile Cataract marked the border between Egypt and Makuria from the 7th–12th centuries.

The 8th century was a period of consolidation. Under king Merkurios, who lived in the late 7th and early 8th century and whom the Coptic biograph John the Deacon approvingly refers to as “the new Constantine”, the state seems to have been reorganized and Miaphysite Christianity to have become the official creed. He probably also founded the monumental Ghazali monastery (around 5000 m^{2}) in Wadi Abu Dom. Zacharias, Merkurios' son and successor, renounced his claim to the throne and went into a monastery, but maintained the right to proclaim a successor. Within a few years there were three different kings and several Muslim raids until before 747, the throne was seized by Kyriakos. In that year, John the Deacon claims, the Umayyad governor of Egypt imprisoned the Coptic Patriarch, resulting in a Makurian invasion and siege of Fustat, the Egyptian capital, after which the Patriarch was released. This episode has been referred to as “Christian Egyptian propaganda”, although it is still likely that Upper Egypt was subject to a Makurian campaign, perhaps a raid. Nubian influence in Upper Egypt would remain strong. Three years later, in 750, after the fall of the Umayyad Calipate, the sons of Marwan II, the last Umayyad Caliph, fled to Nubia and asked Kyriakos for asylum, although without success. In around 760 Makuria was probably visited by the Chinese traveller Du Huan.

=== Zenith (9th–11th century) ===
Between the 9th and 11th centuries the kingdom was at its peak. During the reign of king Ioannes in the early 9th century, relations with Egypt were cut and the Baqt ceased to be paid. Upon Ioannes' death in 835 an Abbasid emissary arrived, demanding the Makurian payment of the missing 14 annual payments and threatening with war if the demands are not met. Thus confronted with a demand for more than 5000 slaves, Zakharias III "Augustus", the new king, had his son Georgios I crowned king, probably to increase his prestige, and sent him to the caliph in Baghdad to negotiate. (Note: Zakharias, presumably already quite powerful during the lifetime of Ioannes, was the son of Ioannes. The matrilineal Nubian succession demanded that only the son of the king's sister could be the next king, hence making Zakharias an illegiimate king. And he seems to establish a new patrilineal succession that would last for 2 centuries until king Solomon) The arrival of Georgios and his entourage in Baghdad was vividly described by the 12th-century historian Michael Rabo. A few months afterwards Georgios, who was described as educated and well-mannered, managed to convince the caliph of remitting the Nubian debts and reducing the Baqt payments to a three-year rhythm. In 836 or early 837 Georgios returned to Nubia. After his return a new church was built in Dongola, the Cruciform Church, which had an approximate height of 28 metres (92 ft) and came to be the largest building in the entire kingdom. A new palace, the so-called Throne Hall of Dongola, was also built, showing strong Byzantine influences.

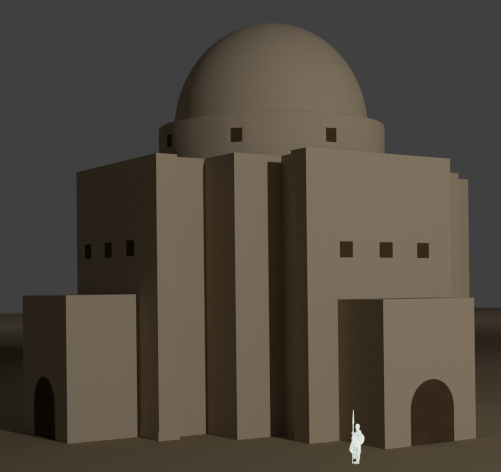
Reconstruction of the 9th century "Cruciform Church" of Dongola. It was the largest church in the kingdom, measuring c. 28 x 37,3 x 34,8m. It served as a source of inspiration not only for many Nubian, but even Ethiopian churches like the famous rock–hewn churches of Lalibela.

In 831 a punitive campaign of the Abbasid caliph al-Mu'tasim defeated the Beja east of Nubia. As a result, they had to submit to the Caliph, thus expanding nominal Muslim authority over much of the Sudanese Eastern Desert. In 834 al-Mu'tasim ordered that the Egyptian Arab Bedouins, who had been declining as a military force since the rise of the Abbasids, were not to receive any more payments. Discontented and dispossessed, they pushed southwards. The road into Nubia was, however, blocked by Makuria: while there existed communities of Arab settlers in Lower Nubia the great mass of the Arab nomads was forced to settle among the Beja, driven also by the motivation to exploit the local gold mines. In the mid-9th century the Arab adventurer al-Umari hired a private army and settled at a mine near Abu Hamad in eastern Makuria. After a confrontation between both parties, al-Umari occupied Makurian territories along the Nile. King Georgios I sent an elite force commanded by his son in law, Nyuti, but he failed to defeat the Arabs and rebelled against the crown himself. King Georgios then sent his oldest son, presumably the later Georgios II, but he was abandoned by his army and was forced to flee to Alodia. The Makurian king then sent another son, Zacharias, who worked together with al-Umari to kill Nyuti before eventually defeating al-Umari himself and pushing him into the desert. Afterward, al-Umari attempted to establish himself in Lower Nubia, but was soon pushed out again before finally being murdered during the reign of the Tulunid Sultan Ahmad ibn Tulun (868–884).

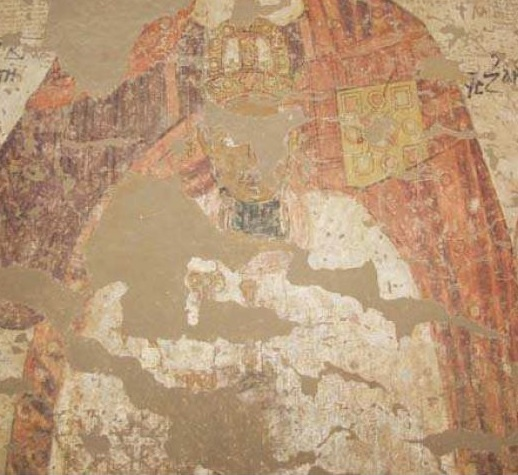
Mural from Sonqi Tino showing King Georgios II (r. late 10th century)

During the rule of the autonomous Ikhshidid dynasty in Egypt, relations between Makuria and Egypt worsened: in 951 a Makurian army marched against Egypt's Kharga Oasis, killing and enslaving many people. Five years later the Makurians attacked Aswan, but were subsequently chased as far south as Qasr Ibrim. A new Makurian attack on Aswan followed immediately, which was answered by another Egyptian retaliation, this time capturing Qasr Ibrim. This did not put a hold on Makurian aggression and between 962 and 964 they again attacked, this time pushing as far north as Akhmim. Parts of Upper Egypt apparently remained occupied by Makuria for several years. Ikhshidid Egypt eventually fell in 969, when it was conquered by the Shiite Fatimid Caliphate. Immediately afterward the Fatimids sent the emissary Ibn Salim al-Aswani to the Makurian king Georgios III. Georgios accepted the first request of the emissary, the resumption of the Baqt, but declined the second one, the conversion to Islam, after a lengthy discussion with his bishops and learned men, and instead invited the Fatimid governor of Egypt to embrace Christianity. Afterwards, he granted al-Aswani permission to celebrate Eid al-Adha outside of Dongola with drums and trumpets, though not without the discontent of some of his subjects. Relations between Makuria and Fatimid Egypt were to remain peaceful, as the Fatimids needed the Nubians as allies against their Sunni enemies.

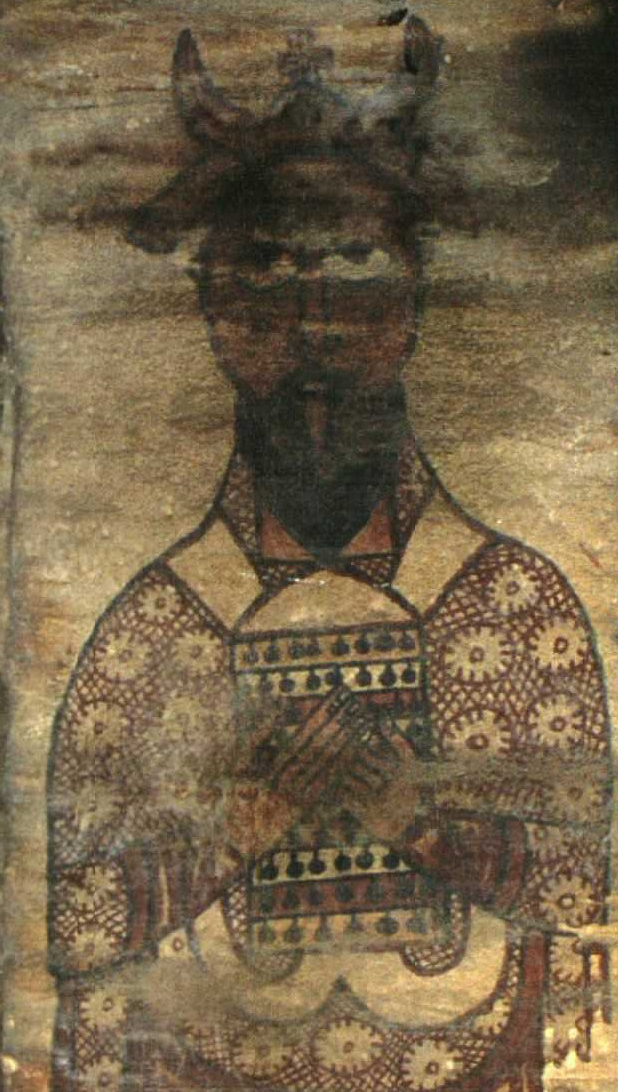
13th-century depiction of a dignitary in the northern Ethiopian church of Qorqor Maryam. Nubian influence is not only suggested by the horned headgear the dignitary is wearing, resembling that of Nobadian eparchs, but also by the style of the painting itself, executed in a Nubian style common during the 10th-12th centuries.

The kingdom of Makuria was, at least temporarily, exercising influence over the Nubian-speaking populations of Kordofan, the region between the Nile Valley and Darfur, as is suggested by an account of the 10th century traveller Ibn Hawqal as well as oral traditions. With the southern Nubian kingdom of Alodia, with which Makuria shared its border somewhere between Abu Hamad and the Nile-Atbara confluence, Makuria seemed to have maintained a dynastic union, as according to the accounts of Arab geographers from the 10th century and Nubian sources from the 12th century. Archaeological evidence shows an increased Makurian influence on Alodian art and architecture from the 8th century. Meanwhile, evidence for contact with Christian Ethiopia is surprisingly scarce. An exceptional case was the mediation of Georgios III between Patriarch Philotheos and some Ethiopian monarch, perhaps the late Aksumite emperor Anbessa Wudem or his successor Dil Ne'ad. Ethiopian monks travelled through Nubia to reach Jerusalem, a graffito from the church of Sonqi Tino testifies its visit by an Ethiopian abuna. Such travellers also transmitted knowledge of Nubian architecture, which influenced several medieval Ethiopian churches.

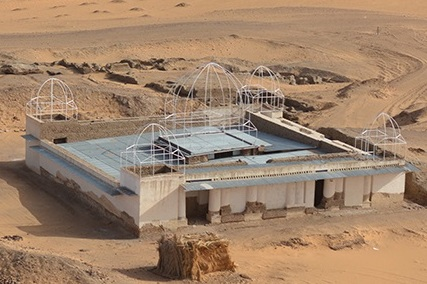
The 11th-century Banganarti church, initiated by Archbishop Georgios

During the second half of the 11th century, Makuria saw great cultural and religious reforms, referred to as "Nubization". The main initiator has been suggested to have been Georgios, the archbishop of Dongola and hence the head of the Makurian church. He seems to have popularized the Nubian language as written language to counter the growing influence of Arabic in the Coptic Church and introduced the cult of dead rulers and bishops as well as indigenous Nubian saints. A new, unique church was built in Banganarti, probably becoming one of the most important ones in the entire kingdom. In the same period Makuria also began to adopt a new royal dress and regalia and perhaps also Nubian terminology in administration and titles, all suggested to have initially come from Alodia in the south.

=== Decline (12th century – 1366) ===
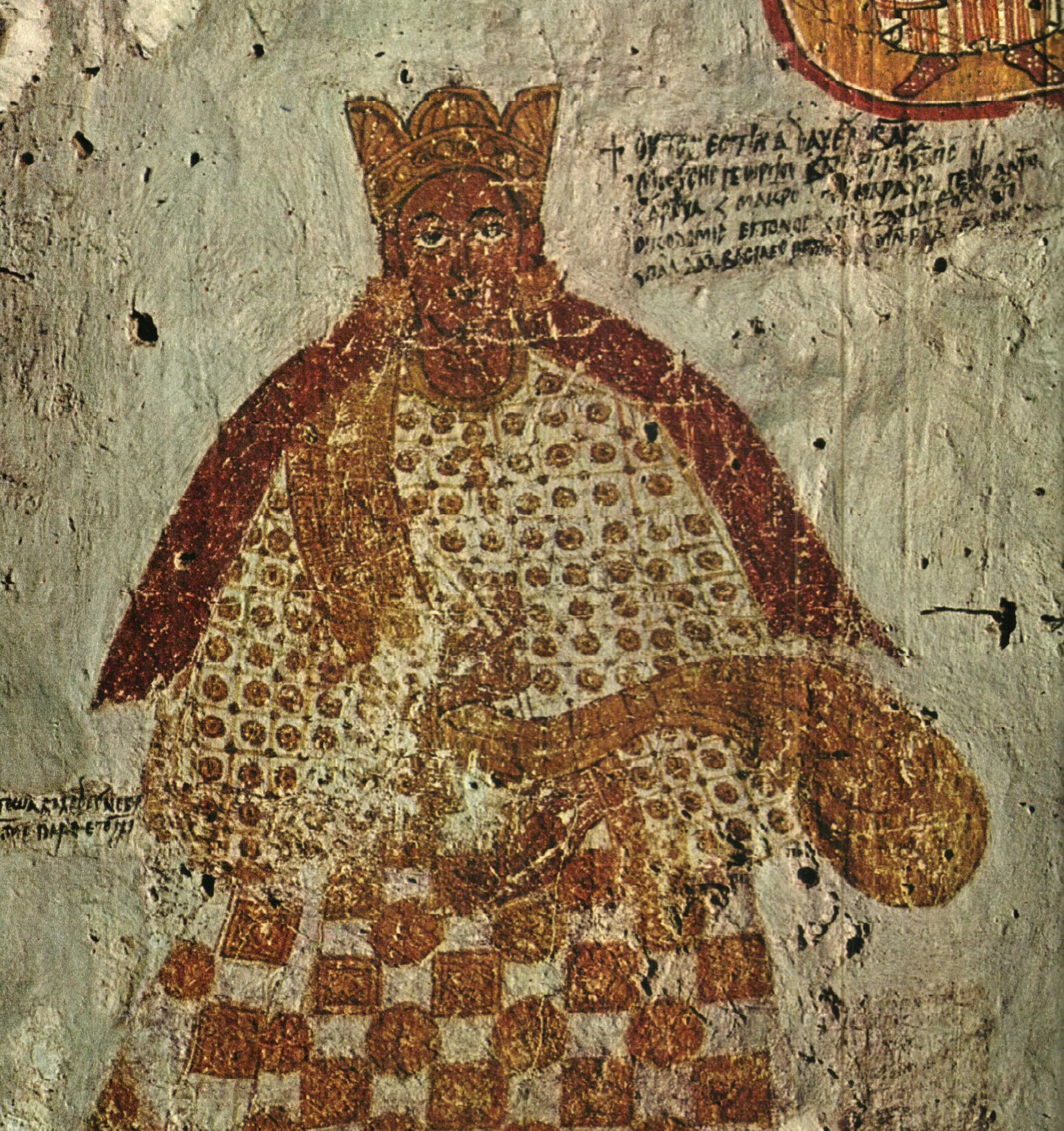
Mural from Faras depicting king Moses George. It has also been suggested that the mural depicts his mother Mari instead.

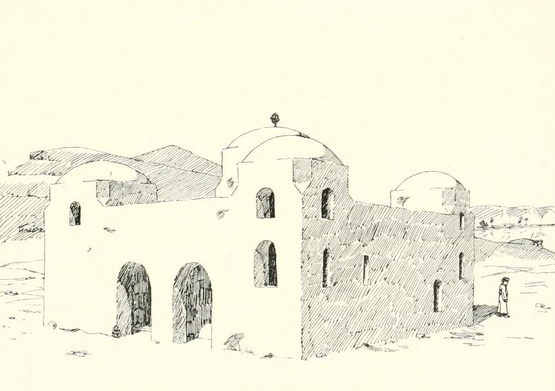
Reconstruction of the domed church of Adindan

In 1171 Saladin overthrew the Fatimid dynasty, which signaled new hostilities between Egypt and Nubia. The following year a Makurian army pillaged Aswan and advanced even further north. It is not clear if this campaign was intended to aid the Fatimids or was merely a raid exploiting the unstable situation in Egypt The latter seems more likely, however, as the Makurians apparently soon withdrew. A subsequent expedition by Saladin's brother Turan-Shah conquered Qasr Ibrim in January 1173, reportedly sacking it and converting its church into a mosque. King Moses Georgios, who probably ruled over both Makuria and Alodia, initiated peace negotiations, but in vain. A detachment of Kurdish troops stationed in Qasr Ibrim would raid Lower Nubia for the next two years until in 1175 a Nubian army finally arrived to confront the invaders at Adindan near Faras. Before battle, however, the Kurdish commander drowned in the Nile, resulting in the retreat of Saladin's troops out of Nubia. Afterwards peace seems to have prevailed and Nubian affairs were not discussed by foreign observers for nearly a century.

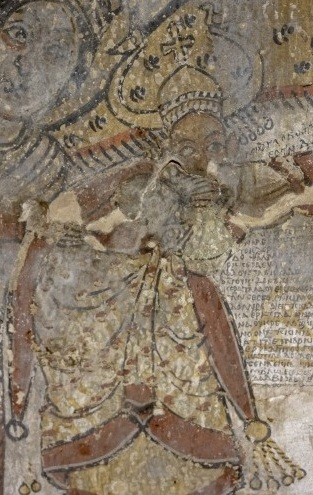
Possible depiction of king David from Dongola

Relations with Egypt worsened with the ascension of the Mamluks under Baybars in 1260. Already in 1265 a Mamluk army allegedly raided Makuria as far south as Dongola. Meanwhile, they also expanded southwards along the African Red Sea coast. In 1268/9 king David usurped the throne and in 1272 sacked the Red Sea port of Aidhab, located on an important pilgrimage route to Mecca. In response the Mamluks sent a punitive expedition to Lower Nubia. After David attacked another Mamluk town, Aswan, the Mamluks dispatched a large army on 20 January 1276, accompanied by a relative of David called Mashkouda. After conquering Gebel Adda and Meinarti it met the Nubian army at Dongola, defeating it decisively. Afterwards Dongola was sacked. David fled to the Kingdom of al-Abwab in the south, which had once been Alodia's northernmost province, but was now a kingdom of its own. Its king, Adur, handed David over to Baybars, who imprisoned him and other family members in Cairo.

Mashkouda was installed on the Makurian throne on 4 June 1276 and had to swear an oath of fealty to Baybars, thus turning Makuria into a Mamluk vassal state. He was forced to send regular tribute in addition to the Baqt, transfer Lower Nubia to Baybars and collect Jizya from every adult, although the latter conditions were probably never put into action. The Mamluks had Mashkouda assassinated soon after. By 1286 a new king had seized power, Simamon. In the late 1280s the Mamluks launched at least two new invasions to depose the king, although the Mamluk sources contradict each other in regard of the timeline and who was replaced by whom. One source, Al-Nuwayri, described the devastation caused by the Mamluks between Meinarti and Dongola, killing everyone who had not fled, plundering the villages and destroying the agriculture. Archaeological evidence from Dongola confirms the heavy destruction and depopulation caused by the Mamluks, although there were attempts to rebuild it afterwards, including the construction of the modest "Tower Church" (14.6 x 9.7m) in the 14th century. The kingdom of al-Abwab reportedly caused destruction in Makuria as well. The Mamluk invasions diminished the wealth of the Makurian elite, which was no longer able to sponsor the rapidly declining monasteries.

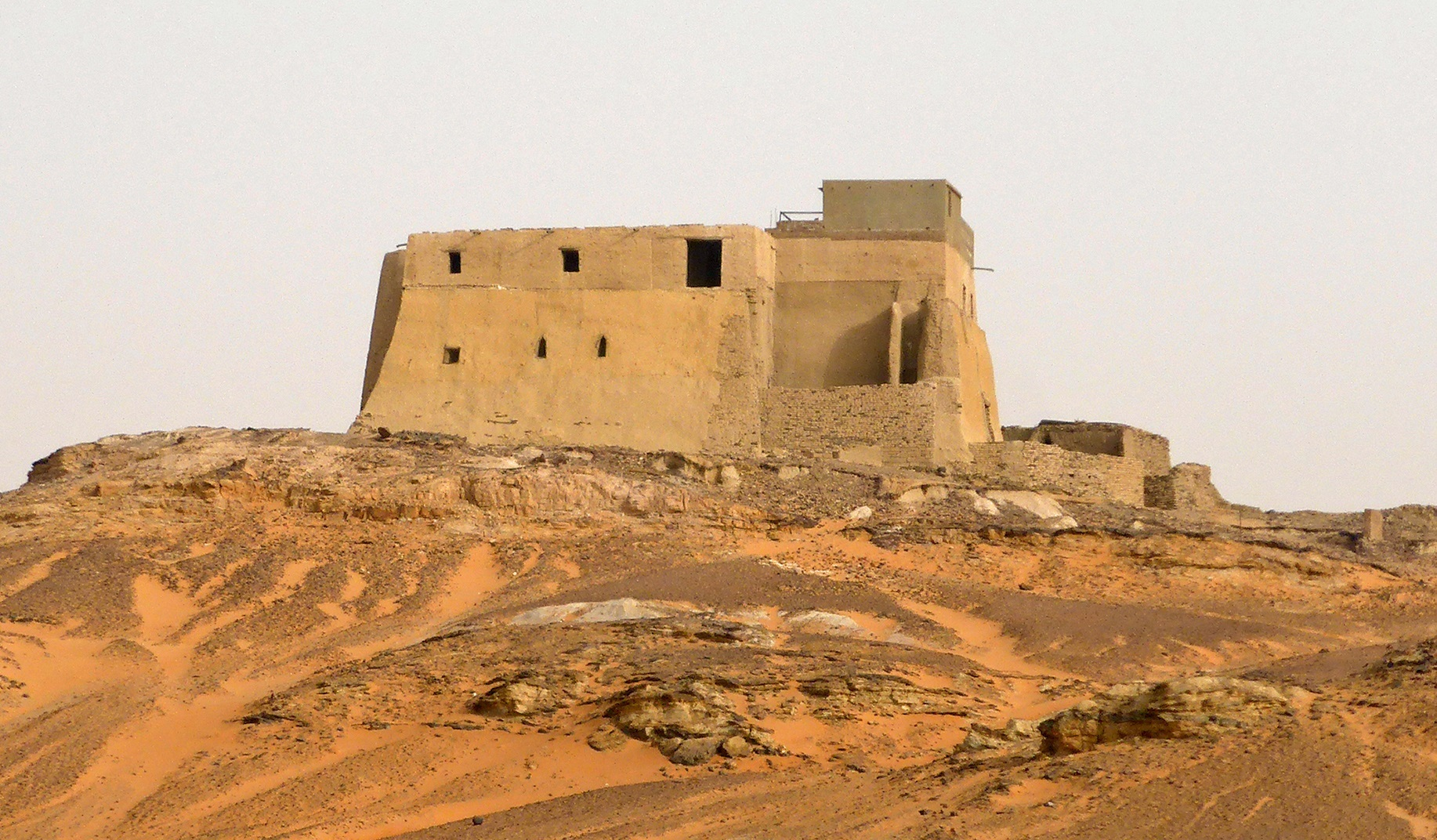
The Throne Hall of Dongola, which Abdallah Barshanbu converted into a mosque in 1317

In 1311 Kudanbes killed his brother Ayay and usurped the throne. Despite his attempt to appease Sultan Al-Nasir Muhammad the latter eventually sent an expedition to install a new king on the throne, Abdallah Barshanbu. Being a convert to Islam, he became Makuria's first Muslim king in 1316. Deeply unpopular, he was slain in late 1317 by another Muslim named Muhammad, another nephew of king David and Emir (kanz ad-dawla) of the Banu Kanz tribe from Aswan. In 1323 Sultan Al-Nasir Muhammad tried to install the same Kudanbes he had deposed in 1316, but as soon as the Mamluk army left Muhammad seized the throne once more. In return for paying tribute the Mamluks finally recognized him as rightful Makurian king. Between 1328 and 1331 he had been replaced by a Christian king, Siti, who ruled at least until December 1333. He is known from various Nubian sources from Lower Nubia to Kordofan, suggesting that Makuria remained powerful and centralized during his reign. The next decades remain murky, but there seem to have been both Christian and Muslim kings. Emir Muhammad continued to lay claim on the Makurian crown.

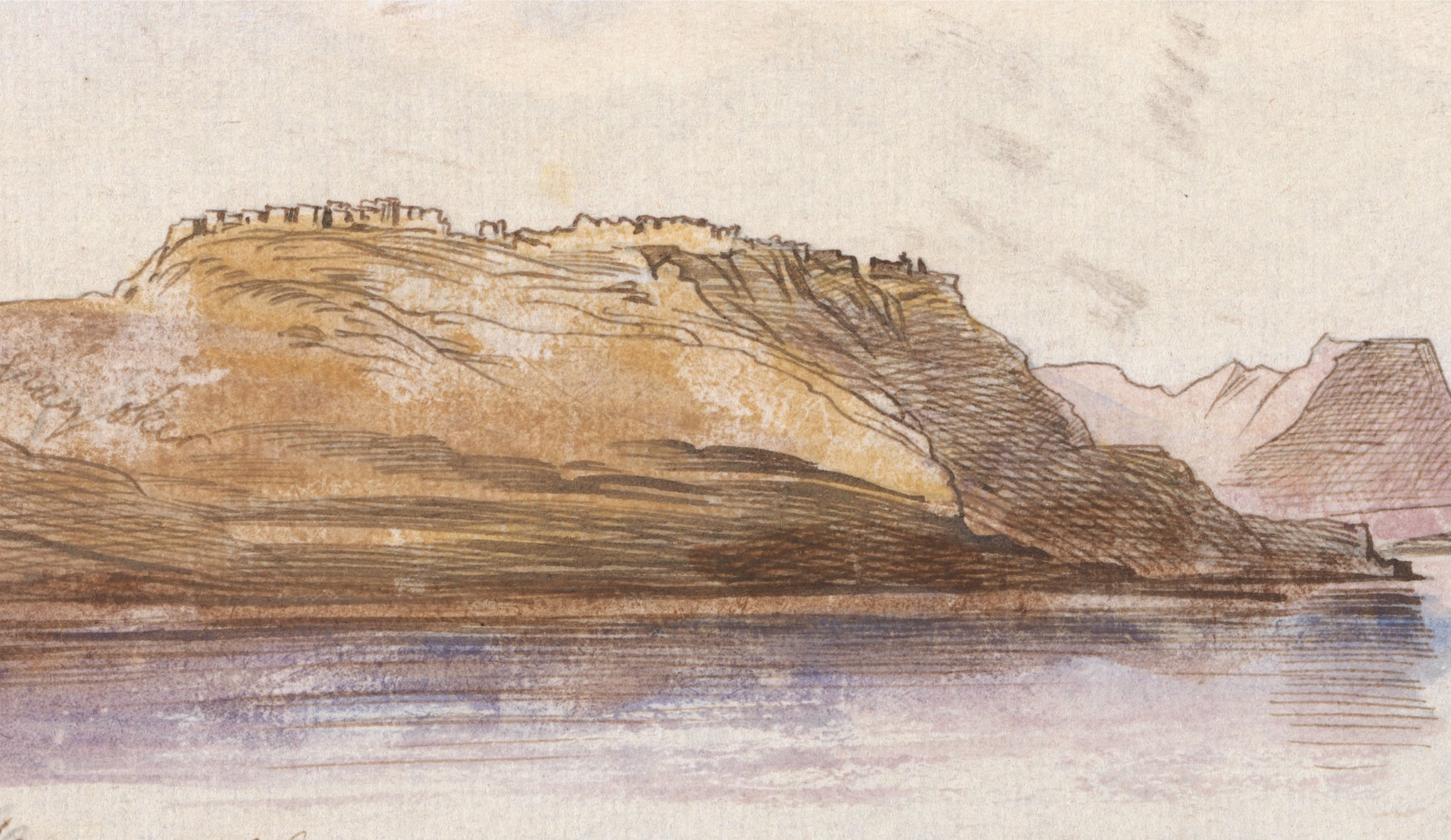
Sketch of Gebel Adda by Edward Lear, 1867

In 1347 the plague entered Egypt and soon spread as far south as Aswan. While no source expilicitly states as much, it might have spread into Nubia, as the archaeological record shows a drastic decline of Christian Nubia from about the mid-14th century. The plague may have devastated the sedentary population, while nomads like the Bedouin were hardly affected and were soon pressuring Makuria. The historian Ibn Khaldun claimed that Juhayna Bedouin pillaged Nubia, seized control of the land and turned the Nubians into nomads. He might have referred to a migration caused by the Mamluks quashing a Bedouin revolt in Upper Egypt in 1353, although Ibn Khaldun exaggerated the impact of the Bedouin on Nubia. Most of them did not settle in Makuria, but migrated further south. Two tribes that did, however, came to play a role in a new Makurian civil war: in 1365 an unnamed nephew of the king allied with the Banu Ja'd tribe to kill his uncle in battle and seize the throne. The brother of the late king was elected as new king and retreated to Gebel Adda in Lower Nubia. The usurper who resided in Dongola betrayed the Banu Ja'd, killed many of their sheikhs and moved to Gebel Adda to make peace with his uncle. The Mamluks sent an army to aid Makuria against the Bedouin. It relieved a siege of Gebel Adda and defeated the Banu Ikrima tribe near the 2nd cataract. Reconquering Dongola was deemed too dangerous and the Mamluks returned to Egypt right after, in early 1366.

=== Terminal period (1366–late 15th century) ===
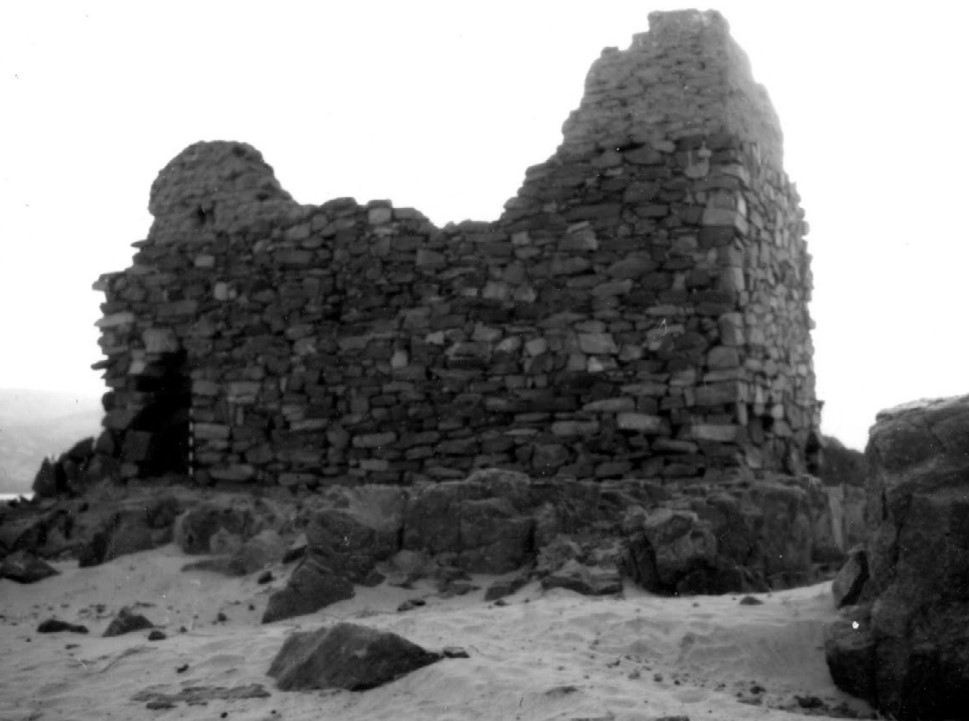
A ruined "castle house" in the southern Batn-El-Hajar

With Dongola abandoned Makuria was now centered around the castles of Gebel Adda and Qasr Ibrim. Its territory was greatly diminished, extending at least from Qasr Ibrim in the north to Meinarti at the 2nd cataract, from where the Mamluks had expelled the Banu Ikrima. It was likely larger, however, perhaps still extending as far north as the 1st cataract to the 3rd cataract in the south. It has been suggested that its territory coincided with the distribution of a type of defensive structure termed "castle house", most of which probably built about the 14th and 15th centuries between Qasr Ibrim and the 3rd cataract. It remains unknown if Makuria ever attempted to reconquer Dongola, which continued to remain an important town. It is unclear who ruled Dongola after 1366. Several graffiti from Banganarti mention a "small king of the town of Dongola" called Paper, who may have ruled over a post-Makurian kingdom of Dongola. This interpretation remains problematic, however.

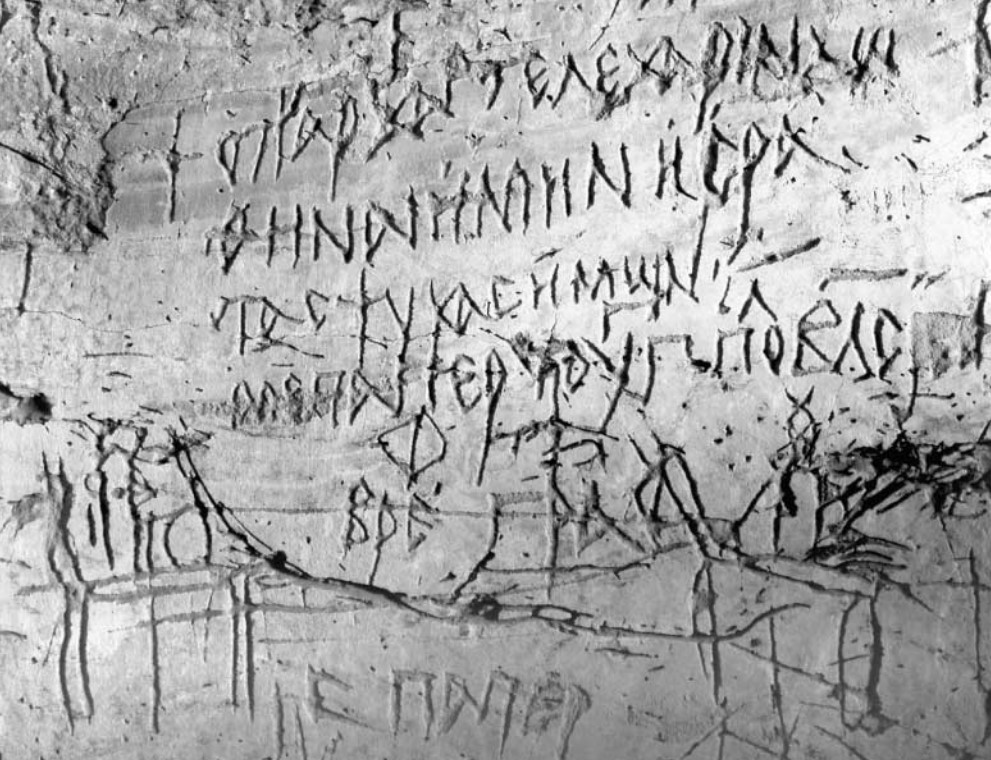
Graffito from Banganarti mentioning Paper, "small king" of Dongola

Very little is known about the history of Makuria after 1366. In 1367 the Mamluks sent letters to two Nubian rulers. One, Apakyre, had his seat in Gebel Adda and the other, a certain Shihab al-Din Majid, in Qasr Ibrim. Both were very likely the protagonists of the previous civil war. In 1397 a presumably Makurian king called Nazir was dethroned by his unnamed cousin and fled to Egypt, helping the Mamluks against a Bedouin coalition led by the Banu Kanz. The Banu Kanz were finally expelled from Aswan in 1412/3 and soon intermarried with the Nubians as far south as Wadi es-Sebua, if not Korosko. This resulted in the ethnogenesis of the Muslim-Nubian Kunuz tribe, while Makuria lost the border to Egypt for good. A graffito from Gebel Adda that likely dates to the 14th–15th centuries mentions an Eparch called Akiri and some unnamed king (previously read as "Taanego"), while others mention a king Koudlaniel as well as a certain king Tienossi of Ilenat. The last known Makurian king is Joel, who is mentioned in two inscriptions and two documents, one of which from 1463. (Note: The other is without a date, but was previously read as being from 1483/4.) Perhaps it was under Joel that Makuria experienced one final renaissance.

Makuria most likely collapsed soon after the reign of Joel, probably still in the late 15th century. The palatial complex of Gebel Adda and its church were abandoned still in the 15th century, while Qasr Ibrim was completely abandoned. About the year 1500 a Syrian traveller called John visited Nubia. He reported to the Portuguese missionary Francisco Álvares that the Nubians were still nominal Christians who had no king but only lords. Each lord resided in a castle, of which there were around 150 in number. On the other hand, another 16th-century Portuguese source, historian João de Barros, mentioned a Christian Nubian queen called Gaua who sent an embassy to Ethiopia in the early 1520s. It remains unclear where exactly said embassy originated, although Upper Nubia seems more likely. In 1518 an Egyptian source mentioned a Nubian ruler, but without saying where he resided and if he was Christian or Muslim. In the mid-16th century the Ottomans finally conquered Nubia as far south as the 3rd cataract, but Ottoman sources do not mention any Nubian kingdoms. Further south Dongola had been annexed by the recently established and Islamized Funj Sultanate with its capital Sennar by 1523.

== Government ==
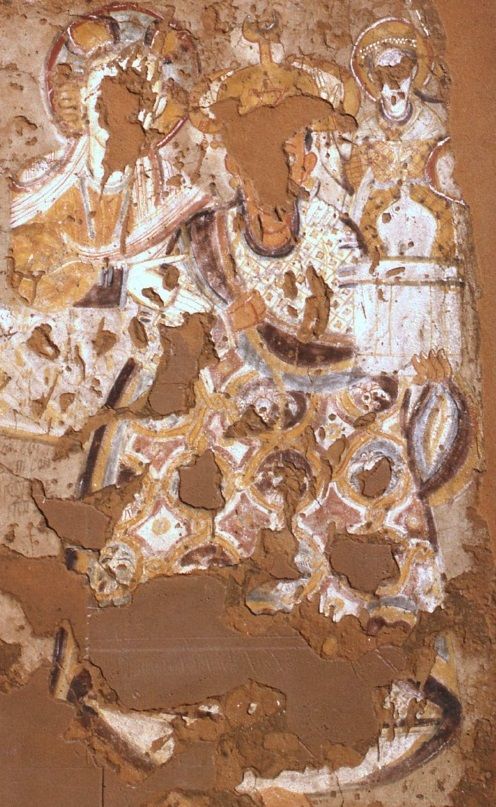
Wall painting from Abd el-Qadir depicting an eparch of Nobatia called Marikouda (c. 1270)

Makuria was a monarchy ruled by a king based in Dongola. The king was also considered a priest and could perform mass. How succession was decided is not clear. Early writers indicate it was from father to son. After the 12th century, however, it seems clear that Makuria was using the uncle-to-sister's-son system. A Coptic source from the mid 8th century refers to king Cyriacos as "orthodox Abyssinian king of Makuria" as well as "Greek king", with "Abyssinian" probably reflecting the Miaphysite Coptic church and "Greek" the Byzantine Orthodox one. In 1186 king Moses Georgios called himself "king of Alodia, Makuria, Nobadia, Dalmatia (Note: "Dalmatia" or "Damaltia" is probably an error for Tolmeita (ancient Ptolemais in Libya), which was a part of the patriarch of Alexandria's title: "archbishop of the great city of Alexandria and the city of Babylon (Cairo), and Nobadia, Alodia, Makuria, Dalmatia and Axioma (Axum)." It has been proposed that there was some confusion in the 1186 document between the titles of the king and the patriarch.) and Axioma."

Little is known about government below the king. A wide array of officials, generally using Byzantine titles, are mentioned, but their roles are never explained. One figure who is well-known, thanks to the documents found at Qasr Ibrim, is the Eparch of Nobatia, who seems to have been the viceroy in that region after it was annexed to Makuria. The Eparch's records make clear that he was also responsible for trade and diplomacy with the Egyptians. Early records make it seem like the Eparch was appointed by the king, but later ones indicate that the position had become hereditary. Towns and villages seem to have been administrated by a sort of mayor, the tot (ⲧⲟⲧ).

The elite of Makuria was drawn from noblemen who the Islamic sources called "princes". It was them who constituted the courtiers, military commanders and bishops. They were apparently powerful enough to openly exlaim their discontent and even depose the ruler if they were unhappy with him, despite claims in Islamic sources that the power of the Makurian king was absolute. A selected few of them, the elders (ⲅⲟⲣⲧⲓ: gorti), constituted a council that assisted the king in his decision making. Such councils of elders were led by a lord (ⳟⲟⲇⲇ: ngodd), a title that also appears on other, less clear occasions. The queen mother (ⳟⲟⲛⲛⲉⲛ: ngonnen) also bore a key role in advising the king. In 1292 an unnamed Makurian king is even reported to have claimed that "it was only the women who direct the kings [...]"

The bishops might have played a role in the governance of the state. Ibn Selim el-Aswani noted that before the king responded to his mission he met with a council of bishops. El-Aswani described a highly centralized state, but other writers state that Makuria was a federation of thirteen kingdoms presided over by the great king at Dongola.

== Culture ==
Historians early on considered Christian Nubia as historically considered to be something of a backwater, because their graves were small and lacking the grave goods of previous eras. Modern scholars understand that this was due to cultural differences, and that the Makurians actually had rich and vibrant arts and culture.

=== Languages ===
==== Nubian ====
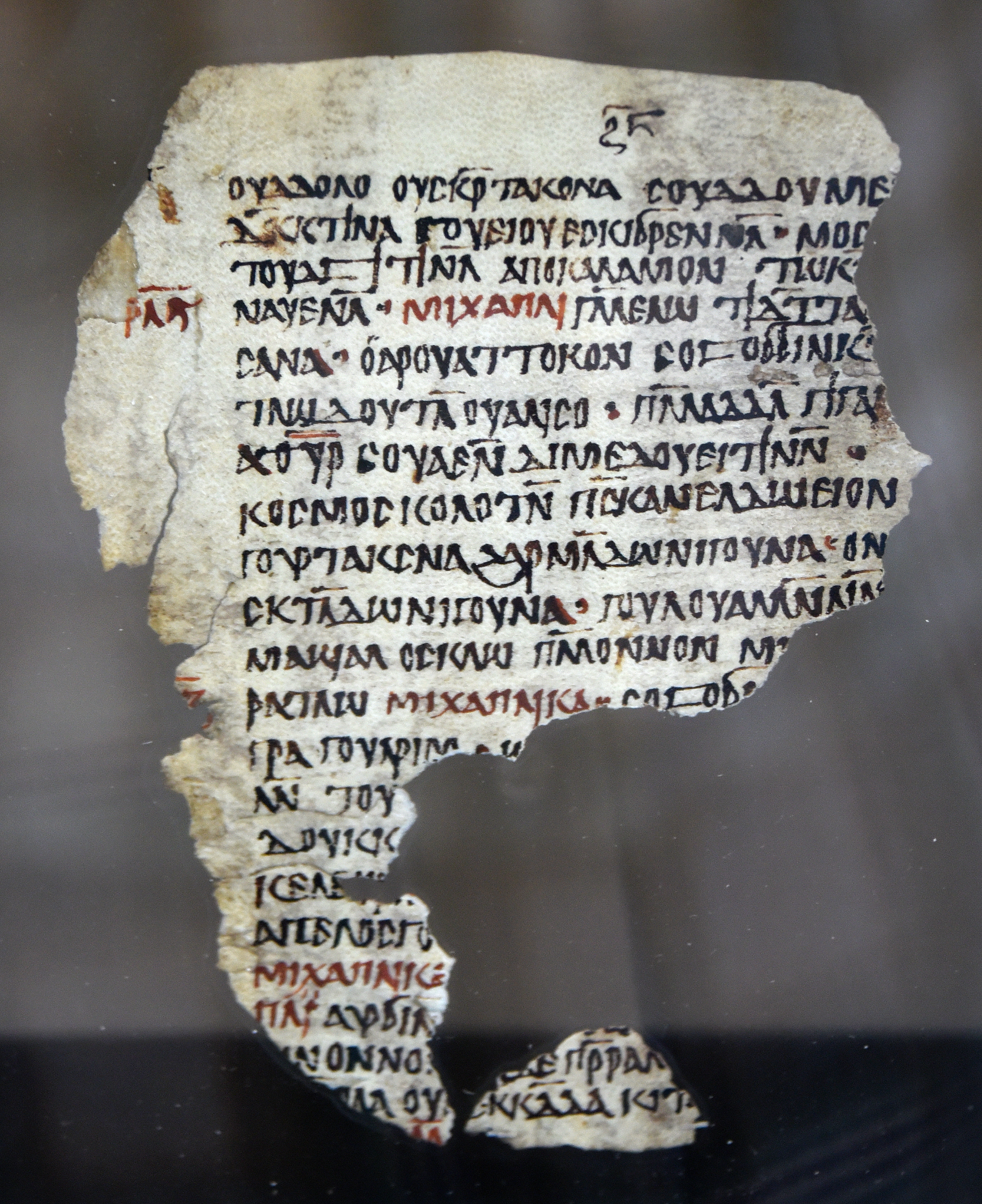
A page from an Old Nubian translation of the Liber Institutionis Michaelis Archangelis from the 9th–10th century, found at Qasr Ibrim, now housed in the British Museum. The name of Michael appears in red.

In the riverine territories of Makuria the population spoke two Nubian languages: Old Nobiin, which was spoken in what was once Nobatia from the 1st cataract to about the 3rd cataract; and Old Dongolawi in Makuria proper. About the late 14th or 15th century some Dongolawi-speakers seem to have migrated to Lower Nubia, whose language eventually developed into Kenzi. Within the Makurian territories of northern Kordofan so-called Hill Nubian languages were spoken, one of which being the now-extinct Haraza language.

Nobiin was written based on the Coptic Alphabet and several letters from the Meroitic cursive script. As it would eventually adopt Dongolawi vocabulary this language, generally called Old Nubian, became a koiné literary language that coexisted with the spoken Nubian varieties. The codification of Old Nubian probably happened soon after the introduction of Christianity in the 6th century. Old Nubian was initially rarely used, mainly in glosses, with the first dated inscription being from 797. Its usage rapidly increased from the 11th century and eventually peaked in the 13th. It was used in literary texts of mainly religious character (for example biblical texts, homilies or hagiographies, all of which were translations), documents of legal (mostly land sales) and administrative nature and finally visitor inscriptions left in cult places. After the 15th century Old Nubian ceased to be written and Nubian became an oral language once again.

==== Others ====
Beside Nubian there existed three other languages in medieval Nubia: Greek, Coptic and Arabic. Greek is the language that is attested the most often. It was a highly prestigious sacral language associated with the Christian Scriptures and the liturgy. Ostraca with receipts for the shipment of grain suggest that Greek may have also been used for administrative and commercial purposes during the 6th–8th centuries. Funerary stelae, which were produced until the 12th century, often featured a rather sophisticated Greek following late antique models. Late inscriptions, however, show that over time Greek in Makuria became increasingly "Nubianized".

Coptic, the second language, is mainly represented by funerary stelae, with the southernmost known ones coming from the Ghazali monastery and el-Koro south of Mograt island. Like Greek it was also used for Christian literary texts and, in Lower Nubia at least, for judicial and economic documents. Coptic also served as the language of communication with Egypt and the Coptic Church. Coptic monks, traders and refugees escaping Islamic persecution settled in Makuria, while Nubian priests and bishops would have studied in Egyptian monasteries. Coptic as a written language fell out of fashion in both Makuria and Egypt about the 11th century, although its knowledge was cultivated by the Makurian court at least until the 12th century.

Lastly, Arabic is mainly represented by 30 epitaphs from Lower Nubia which date from the 9th–12th centuries as well as over 50 documents from Qasr Ibrim, most of them from the 11th and 12th centuries and composed by Fatimid merchants who were active in Lower Nubia. A small Arab community is attested to have settled in Lower Nubia by the 9th century, but just a century later they reportedly started to speak Nubian instead of Arabic, suggesting a process of assimiliation. After the 11th century, with the decline of Coptic, Arabic became the language of commerce and diplomatic correspondence with Egypt. Nubia's eventual Arabization is often linked to the arrival of Bedouin migrants in the 14th century, but it has also been argued that this process occurred under the Islamic Funj Sultanate instead. Arabic was slow to replace Nubian as a spoken language in the former Makurian territories, which remained partially Arabized at best as late as the 19th century. (Note: Western travellers noted that Nubian was spoken north of Korti. The Shaigiya tribe between Korti and the 4th cataract was bilingual in Arabic and Nubian. Most found that only Arabic was spoken upstream of the 4th cataract, although a handful reported Nubian-speaking groups as far south as the 5th cataract, if not Shendi. Northern Kordofan was largely Arabized barring a few isolated communities.)

=== Arts ===
==== Wallpaintings ====
As of 2019, around 650 murals distributed over 25 sites have been recorded, with more paintings still awaiting publication. One of the most important discoveries of the rushed work prior to the flooding of Lower Nubia was the Cathedral of Faras. This large building had been completely filled with sand preserving a series of paintings. Similar, but less well preserved, paintings have been found at several other sites in Makuria, including palaces and private homes, giving an impression of Makurian art. The style and content was heavily influenced by Byzantine art, and also showed influence from Egyptian Coptic art and from Palestine. Mainly religious in nature, it depicts many of the standard Christian scenes. Also illustrated are a number of Makurian kings and bishops, with noticeably darker skin than the Biblical figures.

Gallery

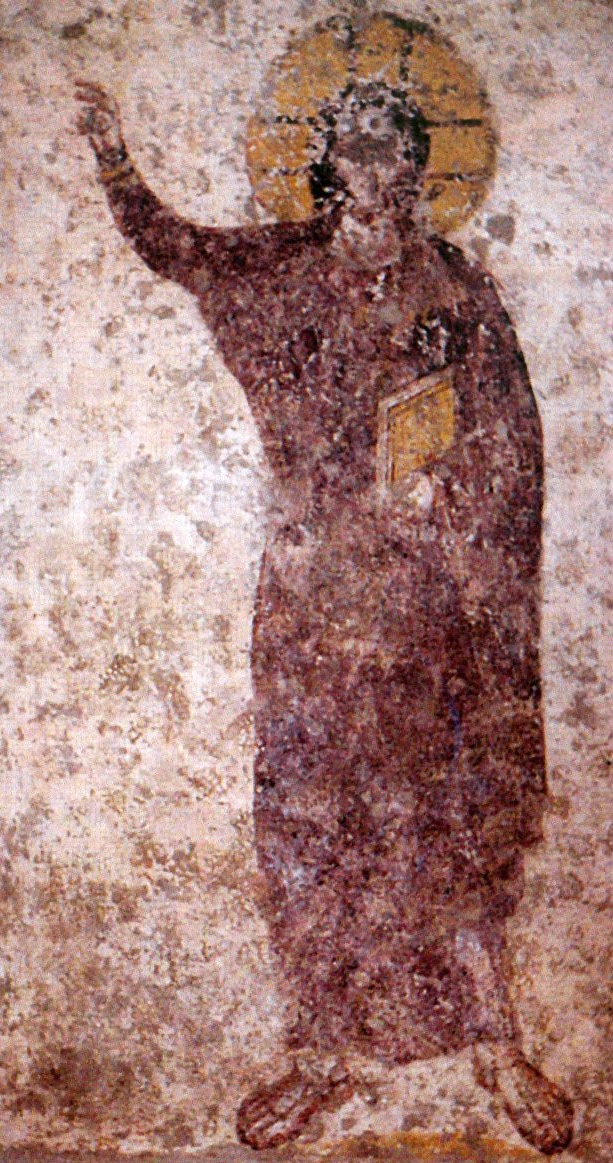
Christ, Abu Oda (second half of the 7th century)

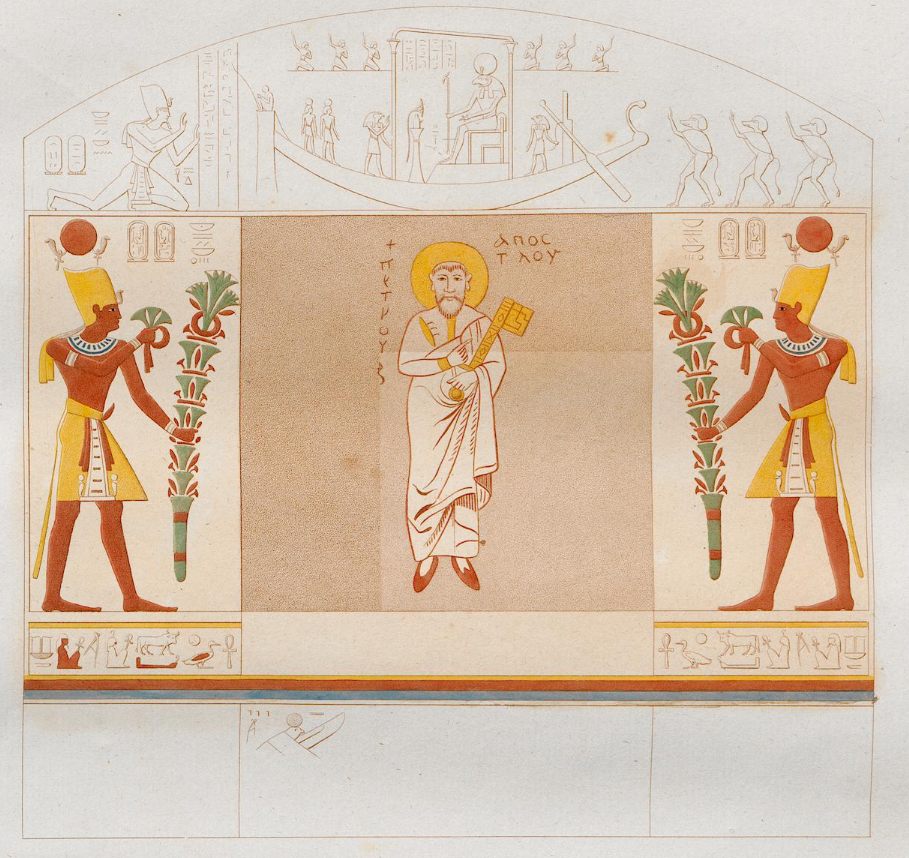
Saint Peter inserted into a Pharaonic painting, Wadi es-Sebua (late 7th-early 8th century)

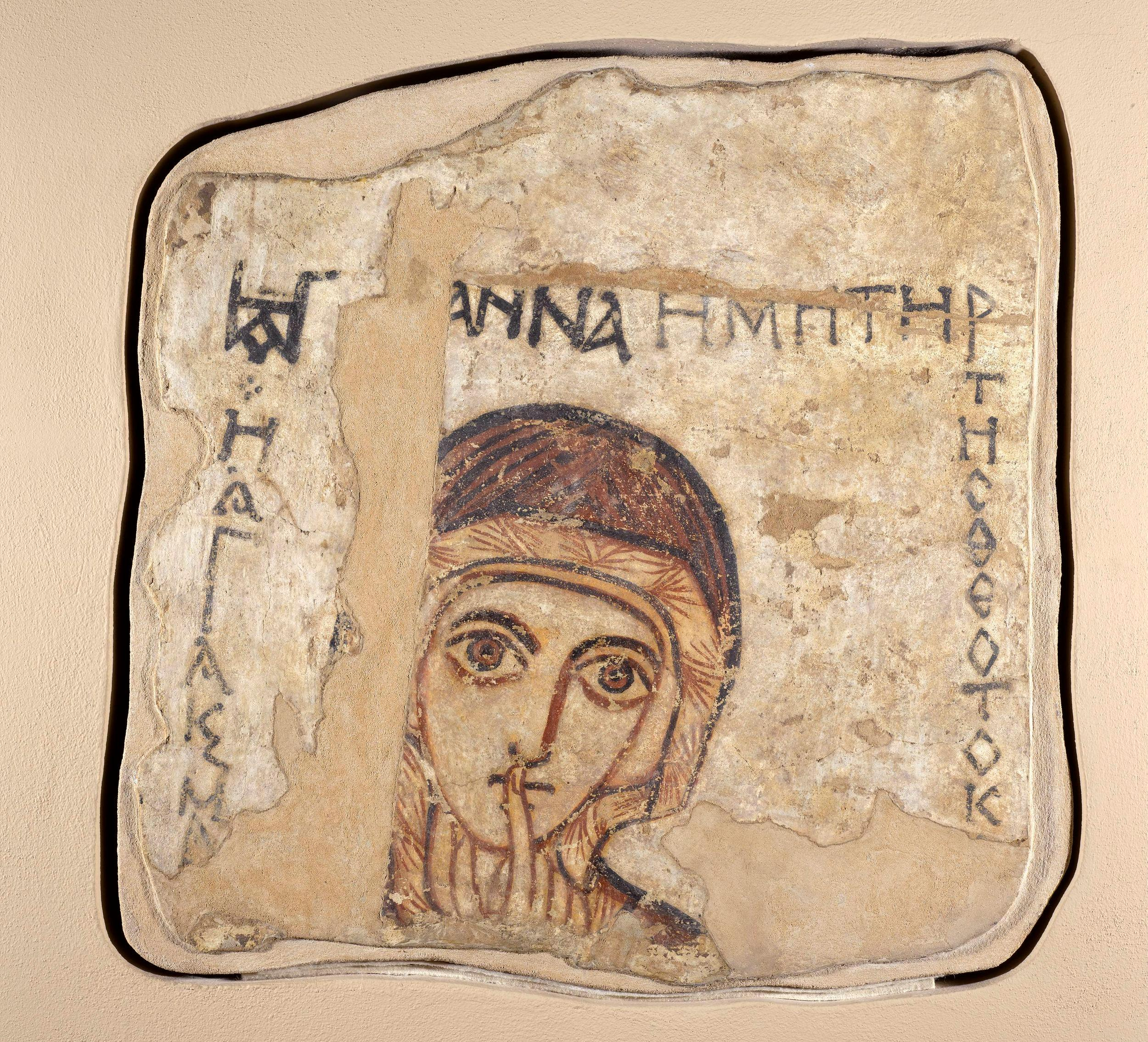
St. Anne, Faras (8th-first half of the 9th century)

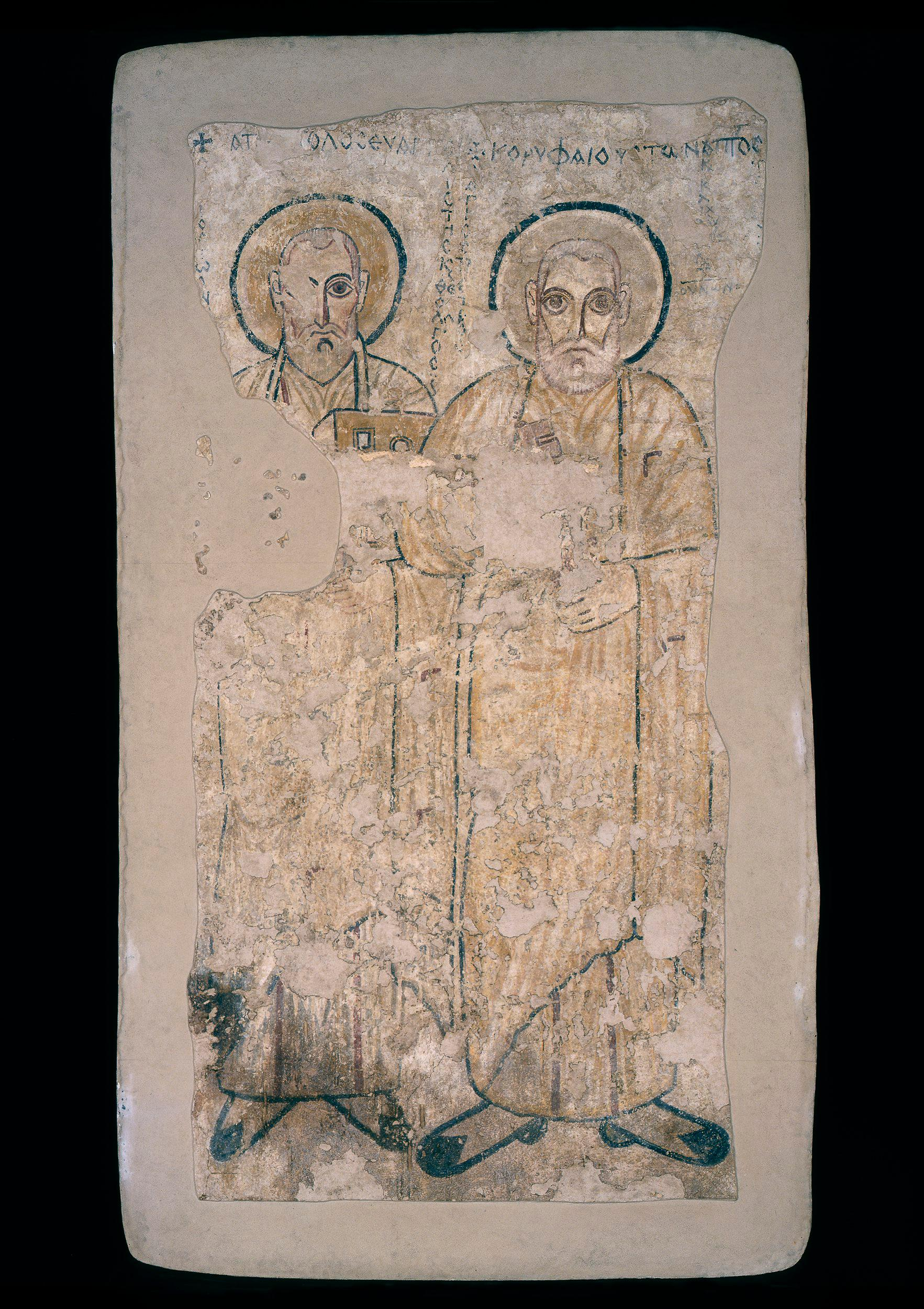
Apostle Saints Peter and John (8th-first half of the 10th century)

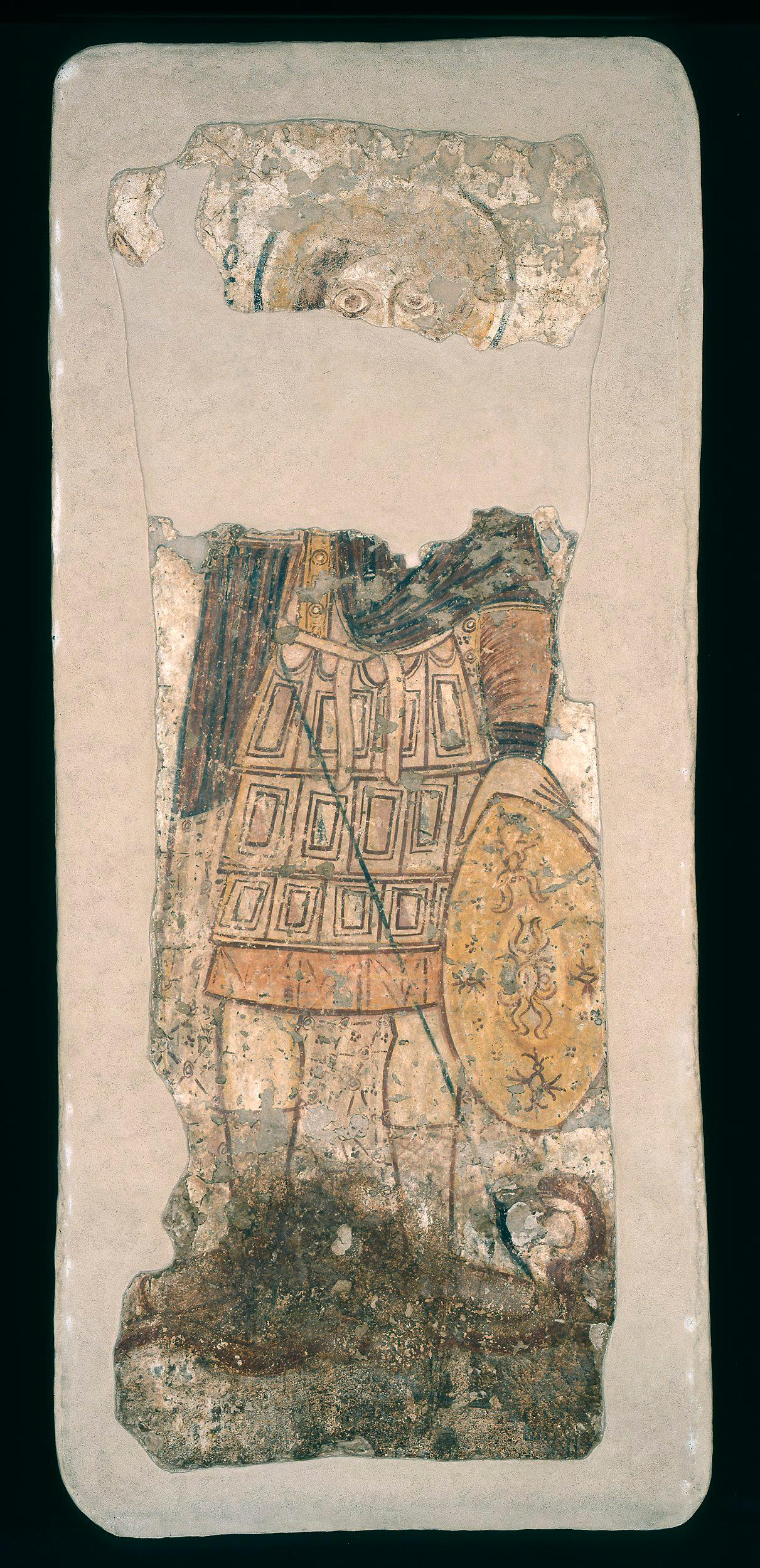
Warrior saint with spear and shield, Faras (9th century)

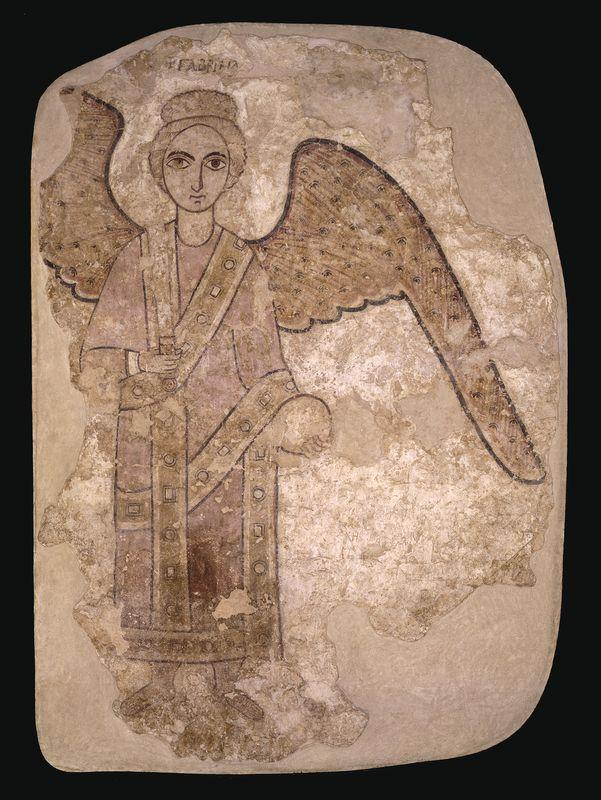
Archangel Gabriel with sword, Faras (9th-first quarter of the 10th century)

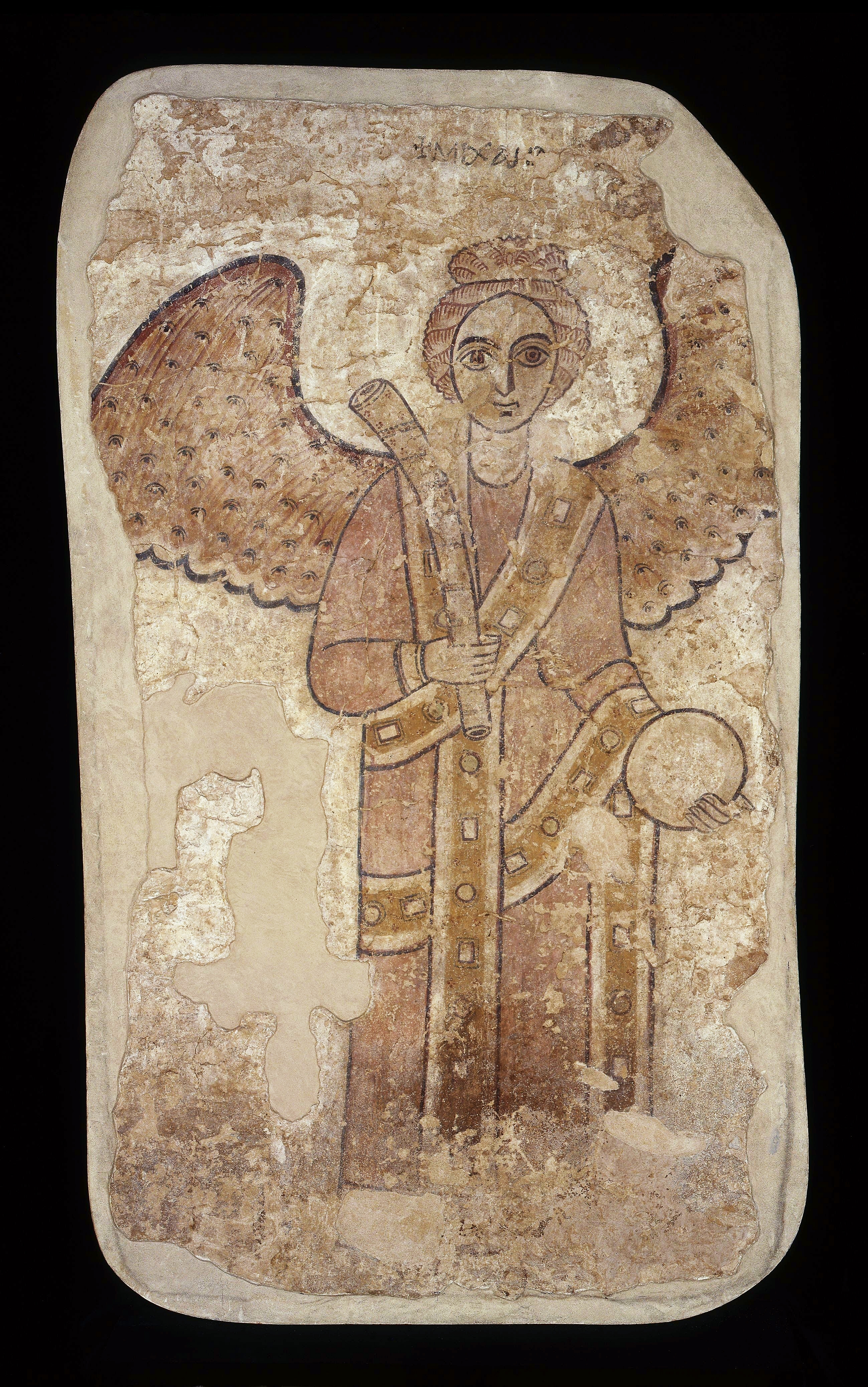
St. Gabriel with a trumpet and orb. (9th century)

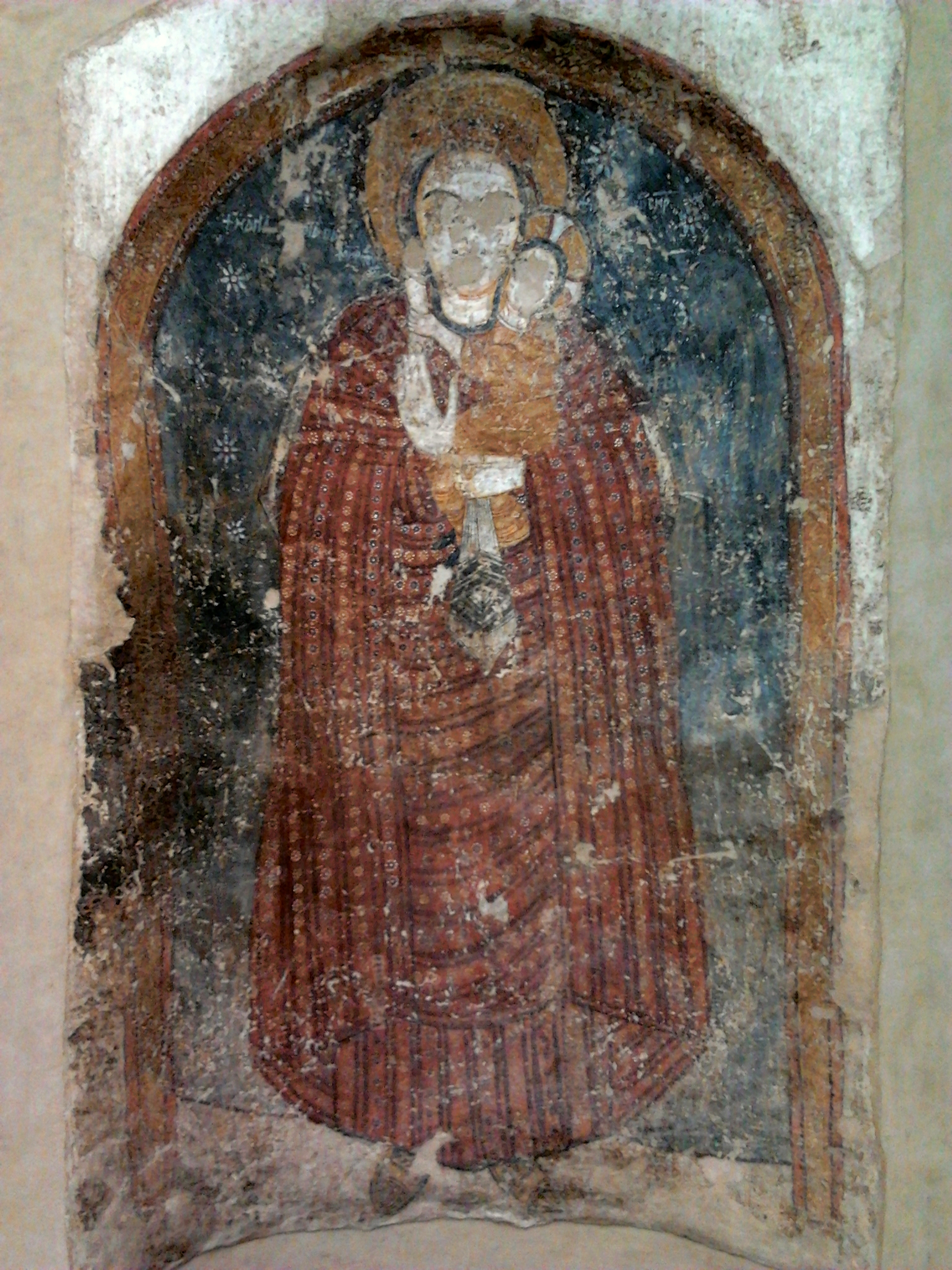
Madonna and Christ Child, Faras (10th century)

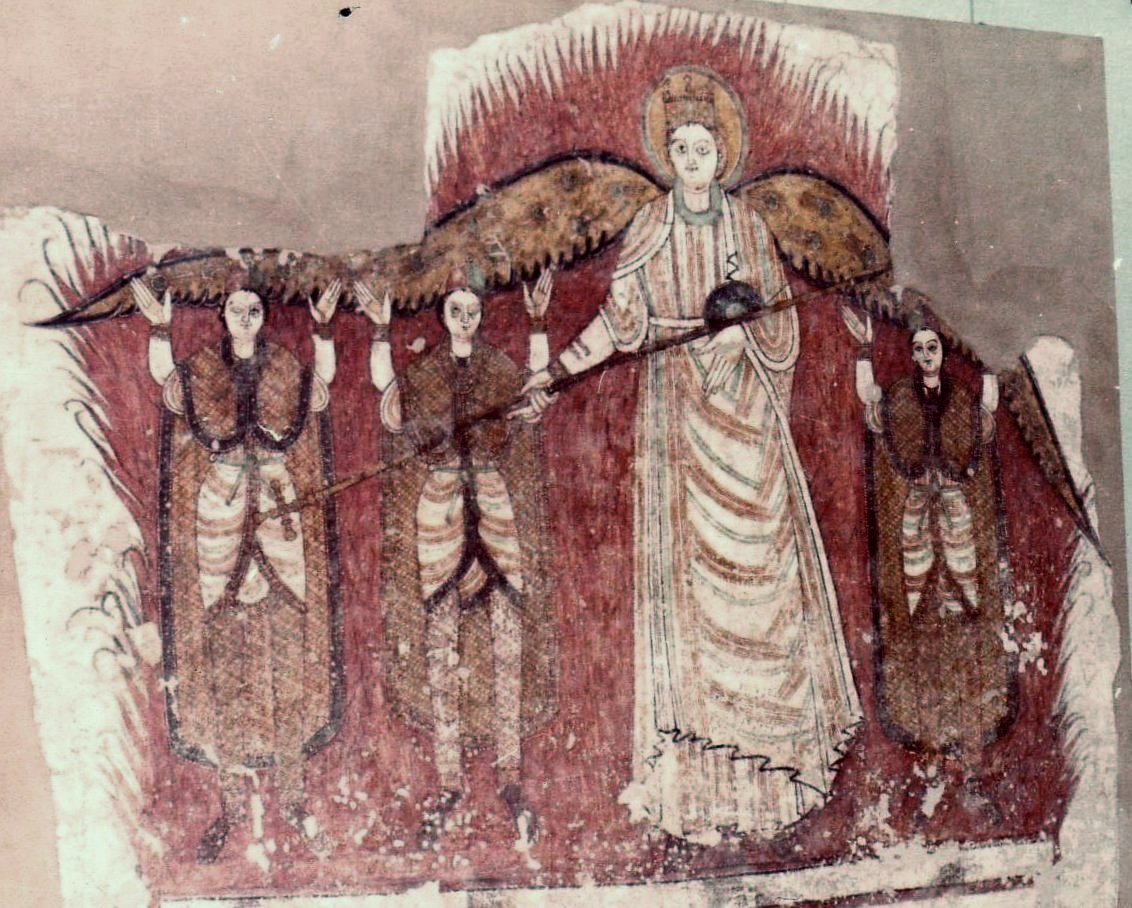
Three youths in the furnace, Faras (last quarter of the 10th century)

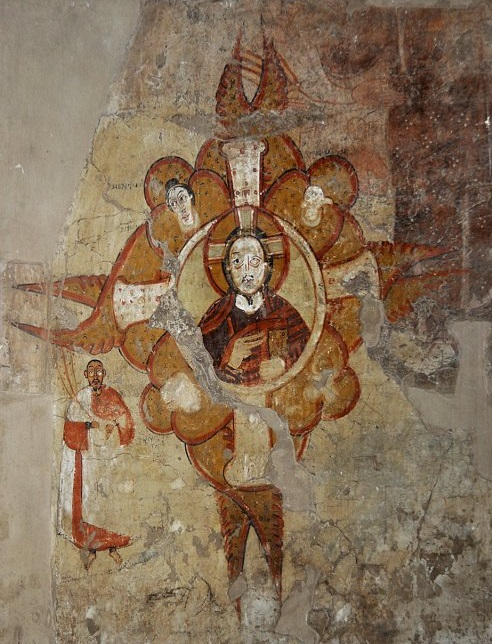
Theophany and bishop, Abdallah Nirqi (late 10th-early 11th century)

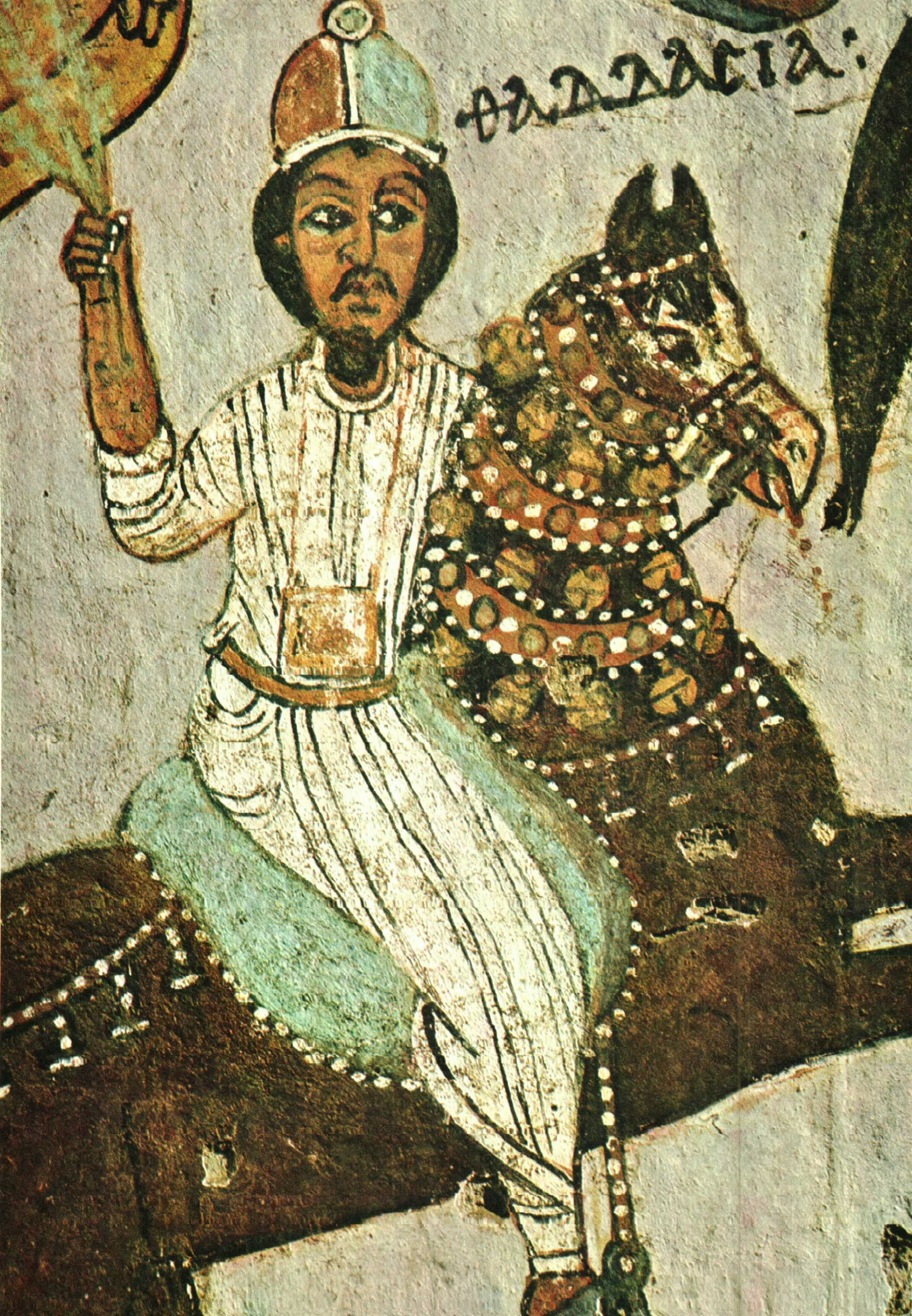
Magi on horseback, Faras (late 10th–early 11th century)

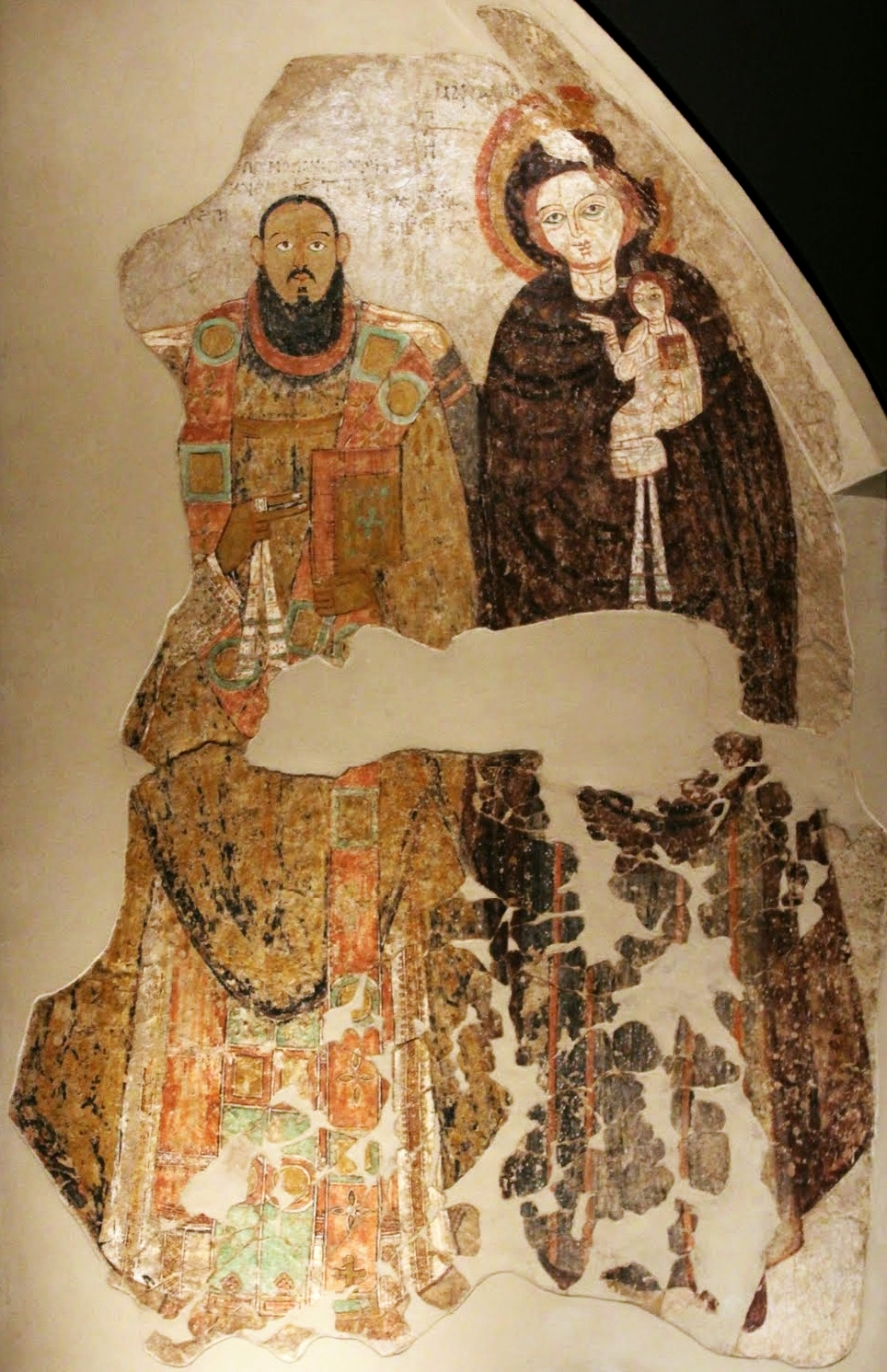
Bishop Marianos with Madonna and Christ Child, Faras (first half of the 11th century)

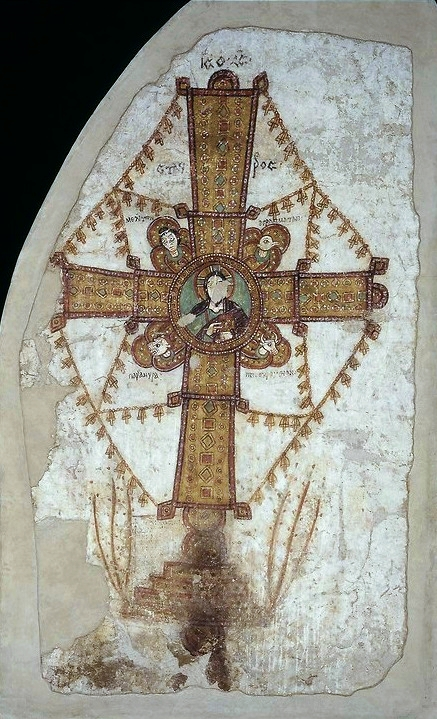
Elaborate cross, Faras (11th century)

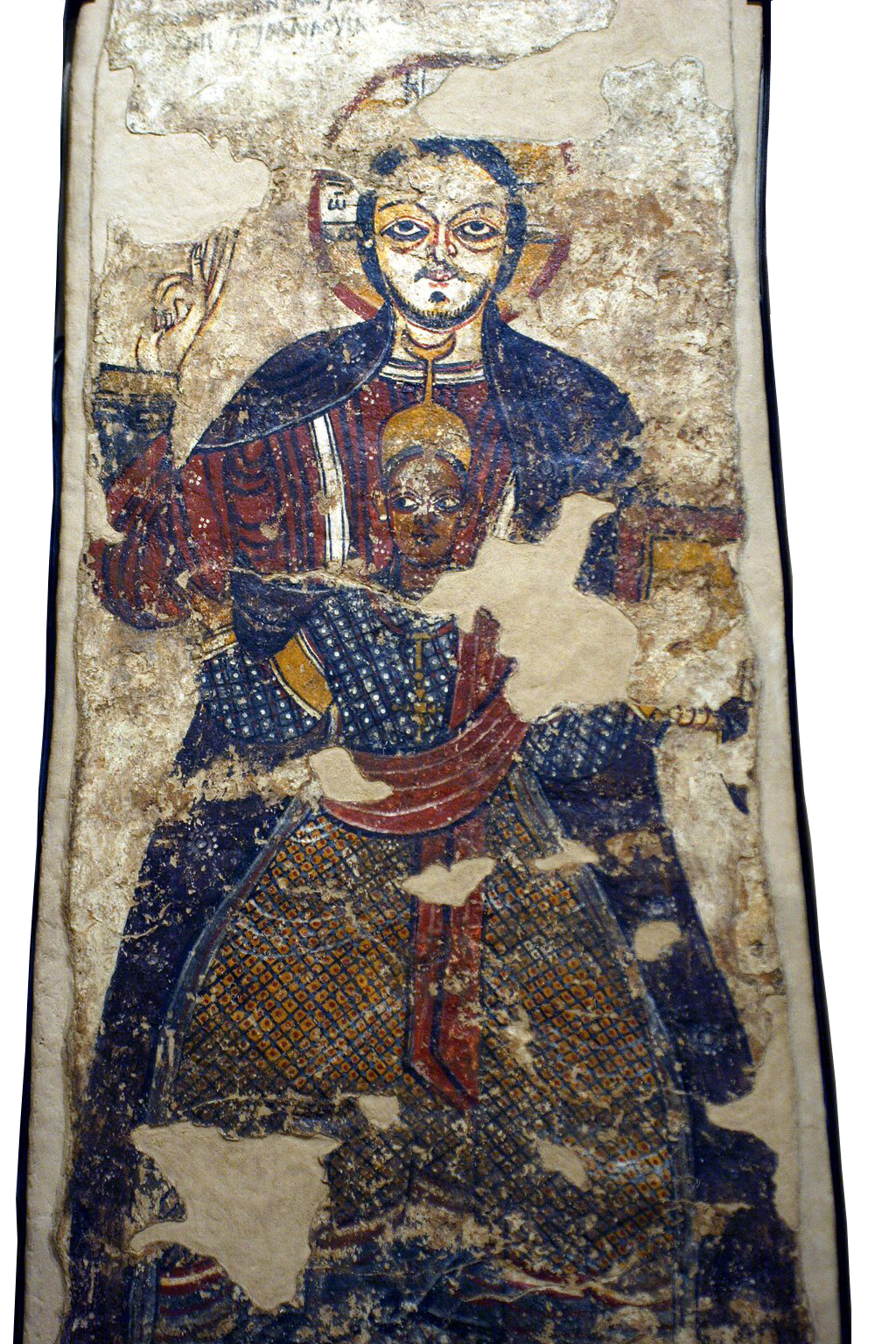
Nubian dignitary and Christ, Faras (12th century)

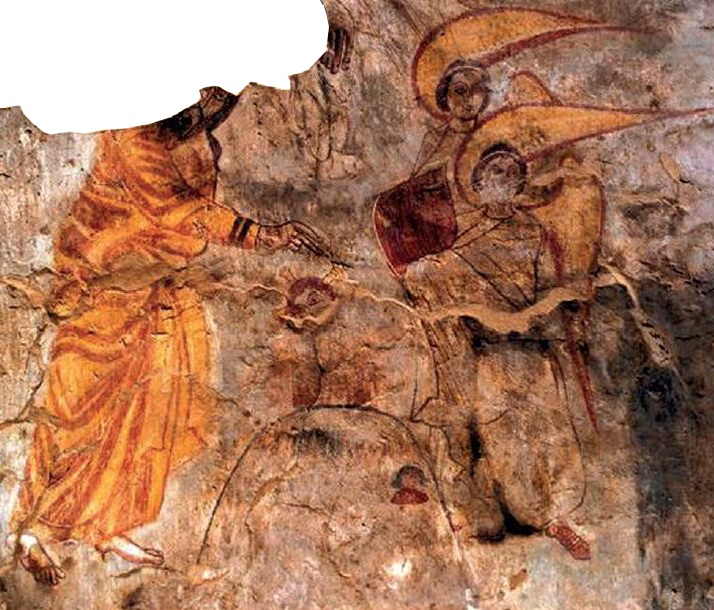
Baptism of Christ, Old Dongola (12th–13th century)

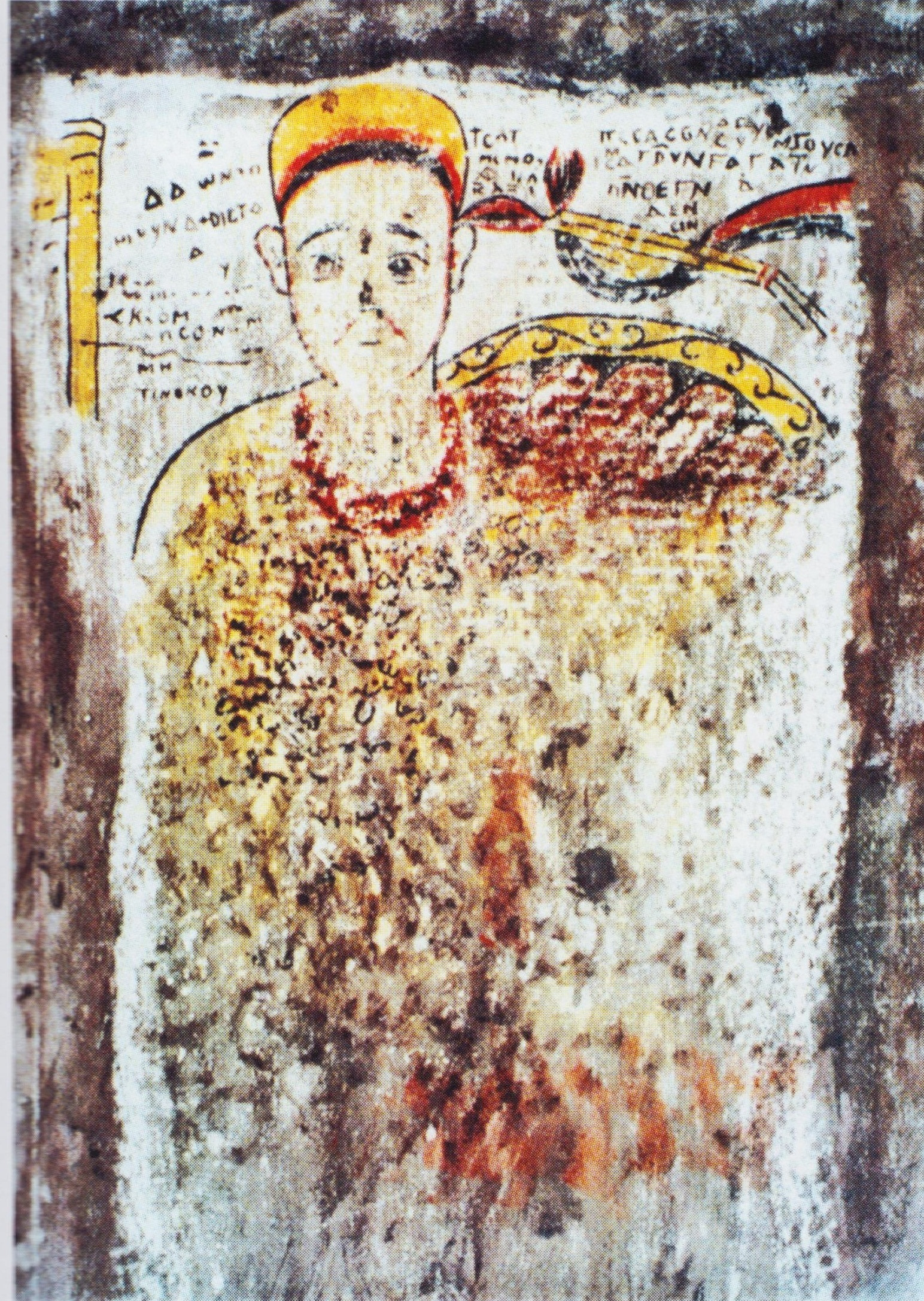
Warrior saint, Meinarti (late 13th-mid 14th century)

==== Manuscript illustrations ====
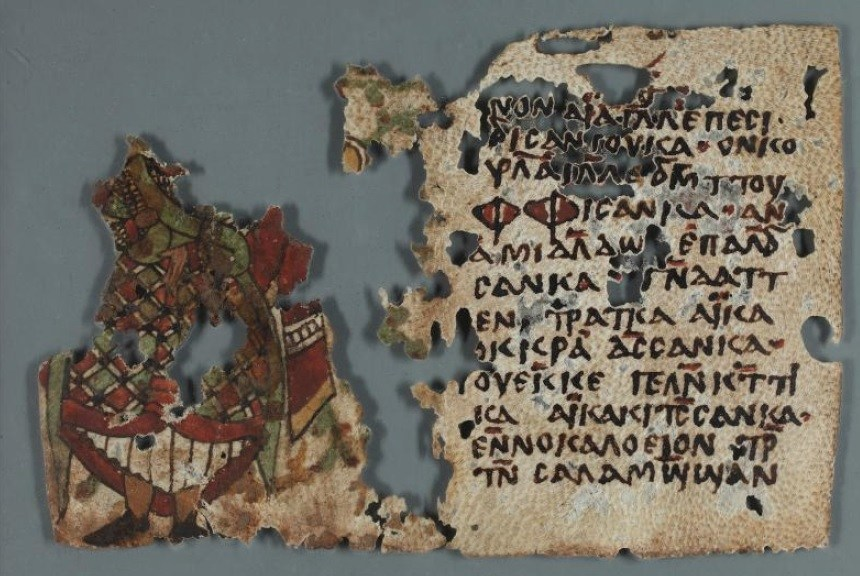
Old Nubian manuscript from Serra East (973) showing some richly robed individual

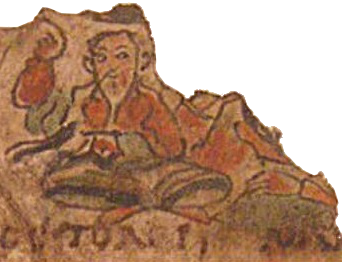
Detail of a manuscript from Serra East showing a sitting man

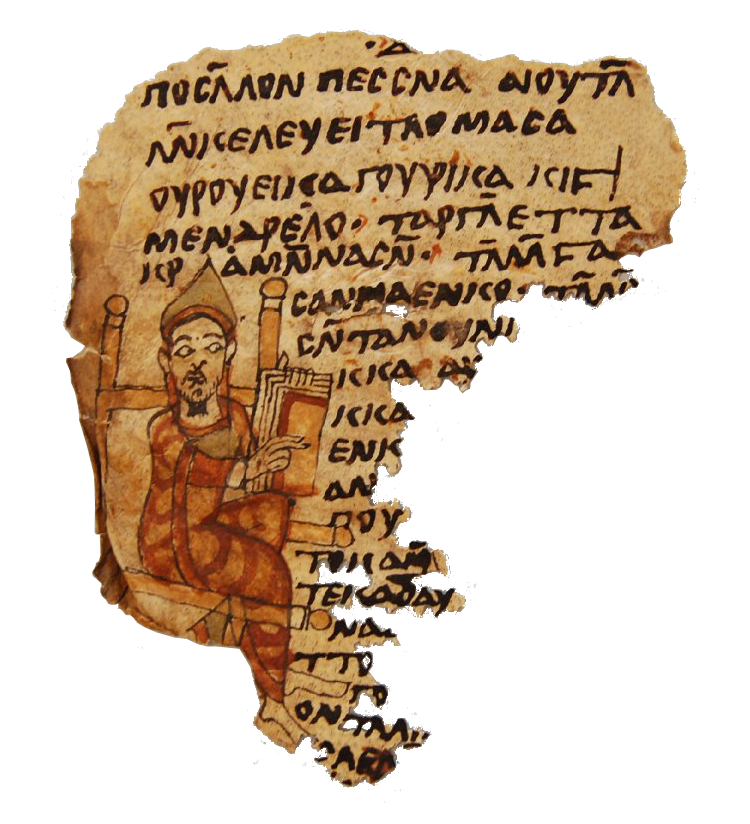
Old Nubian manuscript from Qasr Ibrim showing a bishop

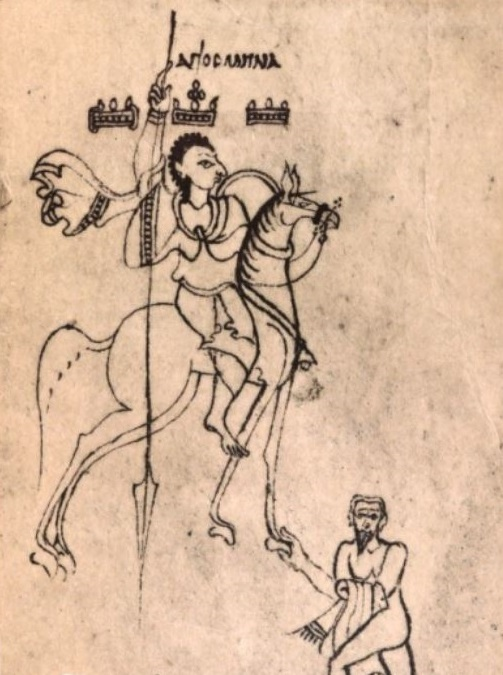
St. Menas and boatman on an Old Nubian manuscript found in Edfu

==== Pottery ====
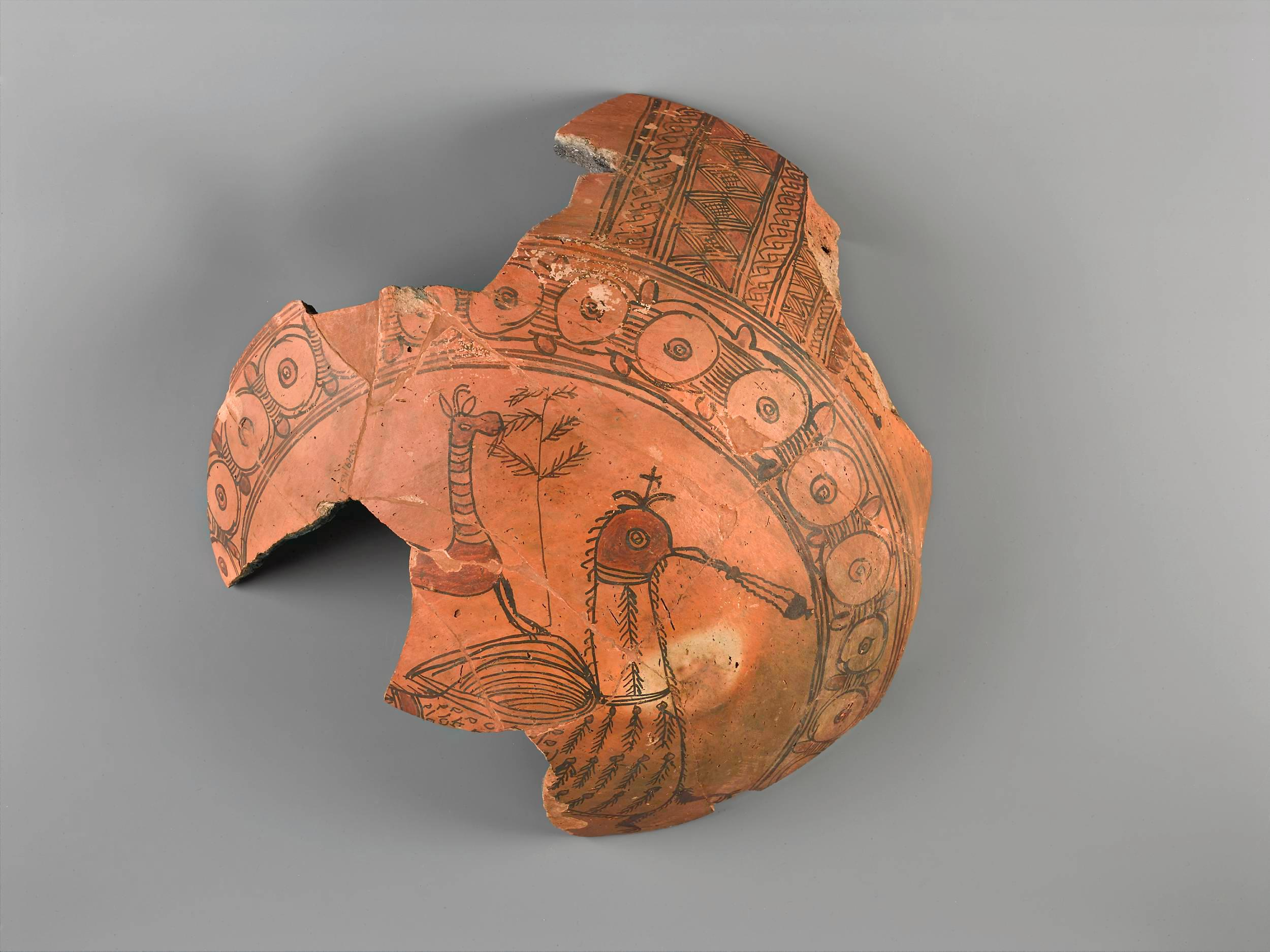
Pottery fragment from Faras, c. 900.

Shinnie refers to Nubian pottery as the "richest indigenous pottery tradition on the African continent." Scholars divide the pottery into three eras. The early period, from 550 to 650 according to Adams, or to 750 according to Shinnie, saw fairly simple pottery similar to that of the late Roman Empire. It also saw much of Nubian pottery imported from Egypt rather than produced domestically. Adams feels this trade ended with the invasion of 652; Shinnie links it to the collapse of Umayyad rule in 750. After this domestic production increased, with a major production facility at Faras. In this middle era, which lasted until around 1100, the pottery was painted with floral and zoomorphic scenes and showed distinct Umayyad and even Sassanian influences. The late period during Makuria's decline saw domestic production again fall in favour of imports from Egypt. Pottery produced in Makuria became less ornate, but better control of firing temperatures allowed different colours of clay.

=== Role of women ===
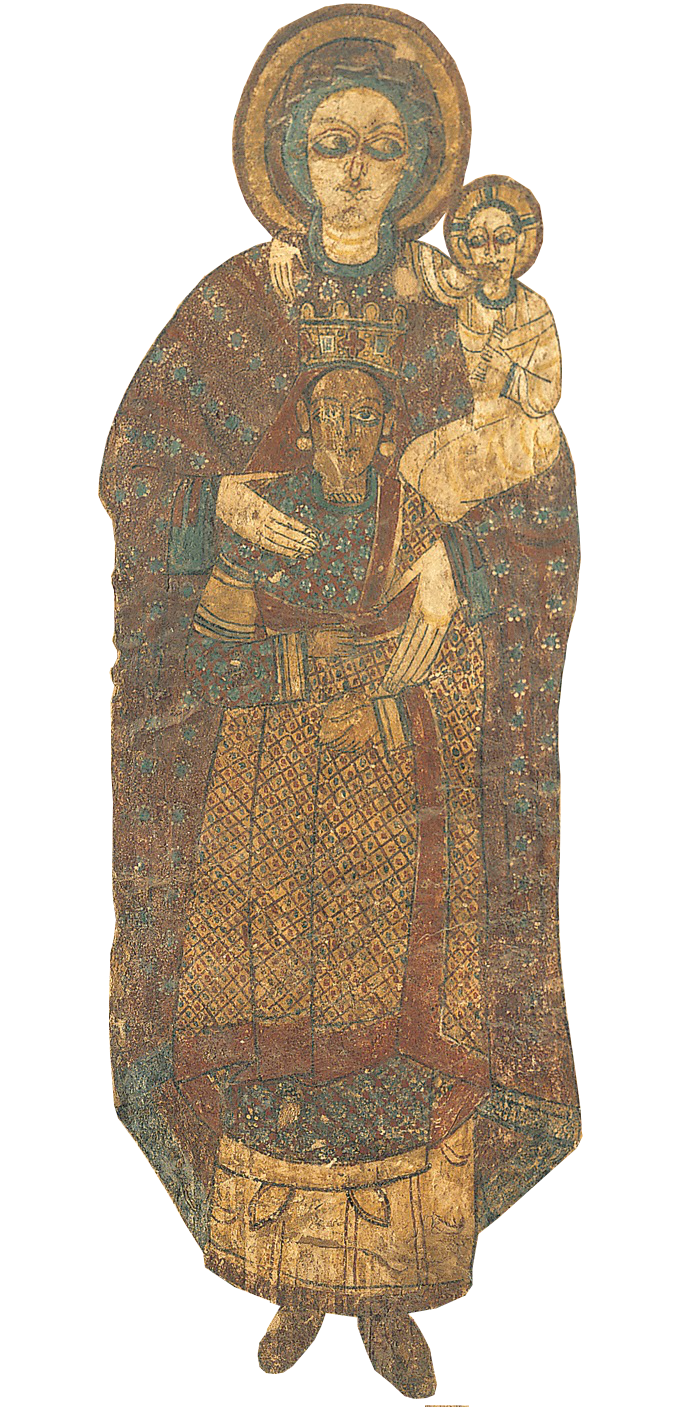
Makurian princess protected by Virgin Mary and Christ Child, Faras (12th century)

The Christian kingdom was fairly egalitarian and women enjoyed a somewhat equal social standing. The later period of matrilineal succession gave the queen mother and the sister of the current king as forthcoming queen mother political relevance. This importance is attested by the fact that she appears in legal documents. Another female political title was the asta ("daughter"), perhaps some type of courtesy title of some sort.

Women had access to education and there is evidence that, like in Byzantine Egypt, female scribes existed. Private land tenure was open to both men and women, meaning that both could own, buy and sell land. Transfers of land from mother to daughter were common. They could also be the patrons of churches and wall paintings. Inscriptions from the cathedral of Faras indicate that around every second wall painting had a female sponsor. An inscription from Faras suggests that women could sometimes also serve as deacons.

=== Hygiene ===
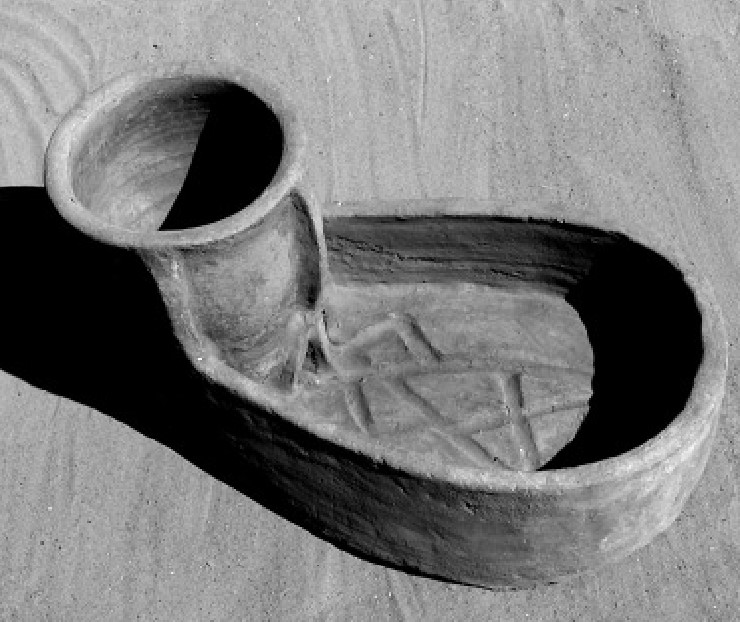
Ceramic toilet, Dongola

Latrines were a common sight in Nubian domestic buildings. In Dongola all houses had ceramic toilets. Some houses in Cerra Matto (Serra East) featured privies with ceramic toilets, which were connected to a small chamber with a stone-lined clean out window to the outside and a brick ventilation flue. Biconical pieces of clay served as the equivalent of toilet paper.

One house in Dongola featured a vaulted bathroom, fed by a system of pipes attached to a water tank. A furnace heated up both the water and the air, which was circulated into the richly decorated bathroom via flues in the walls. The monastic complex of Hambukol is thought to have had a room serving as a steam bath. The Ghazali monastery in Wadi Abu Dom also might have featured several bathrooms.

== Religion ==
=== Paganism ===
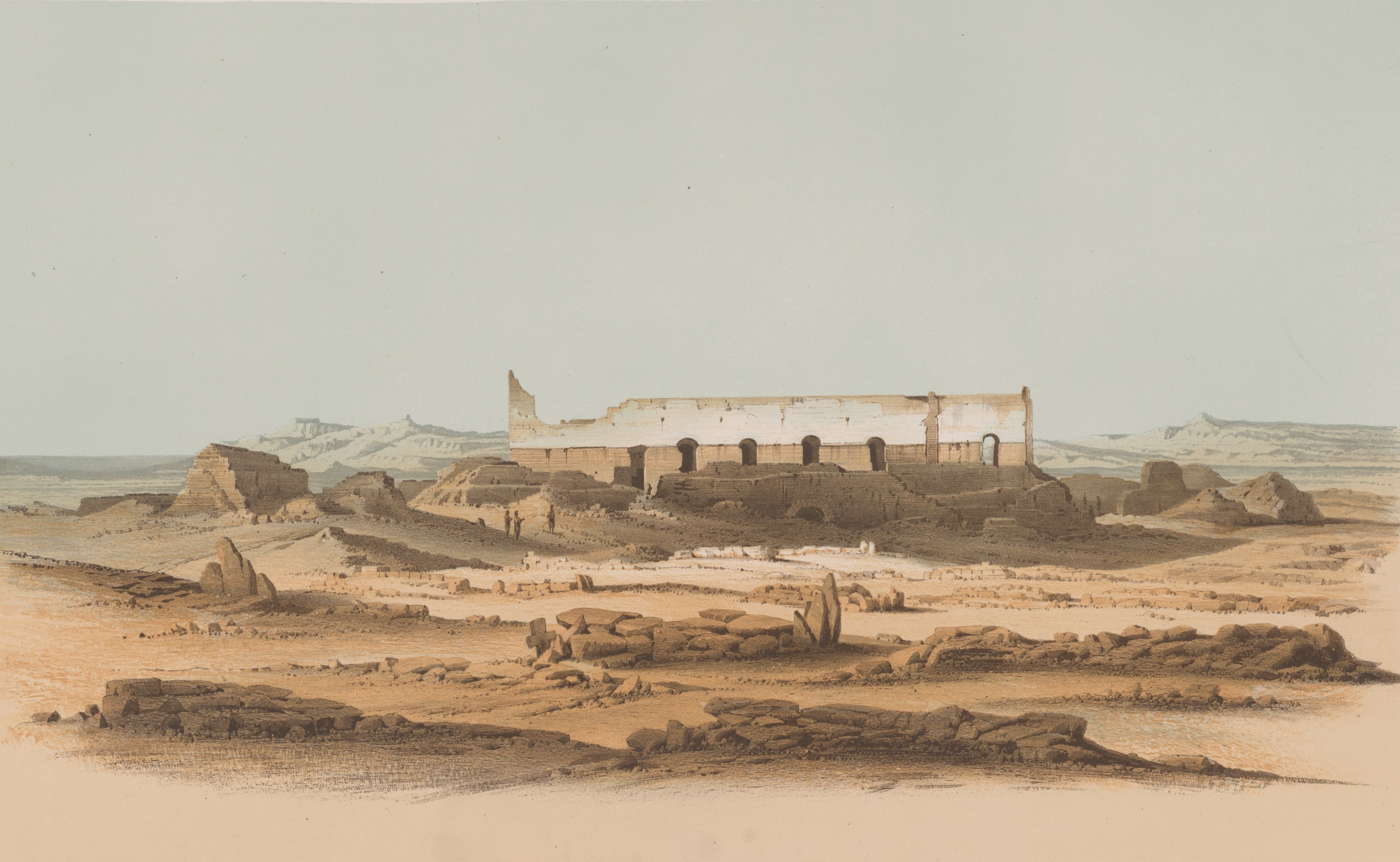
The remains of the Ghazali monastery on a mid-19th century painting by Karl Richard Lepsius

One of the most debated issues among scholars is over the religion of Makuria. Up to the 5th century the old faith of Meroe, the Kushite religion seems to have remained strong, even while ancient Egyptian religion, its counterpart in Egypt, disappeared. In the 5th century the Nubians went so far as to launch an invasion of Egypt when the Christians there tried to turn some of the main temples into churches. A portion of the Nubian population seemingly remained Animist as late as the 10th century, for el-Aswani reported that "[s]ome of them do not know the Creator and adore the Sun and the Day; some others adore whatever they like; trees or animals."

=== Christianity ===
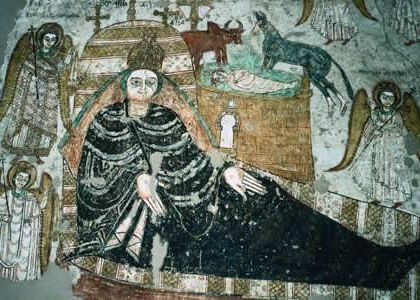
A painting from the Faras Cathedral depicting the birth of Jesus

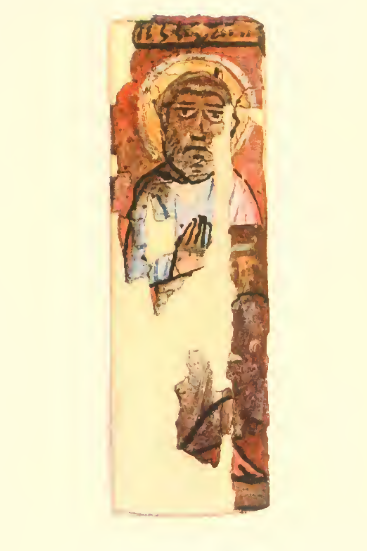
Wood painting from Wadi Halfa depicting some Christian saint

Archaeological evidence in this period finds a number of Christian ornaments in Nubia, and some scholars feel that this implies that conversion from below was already taking place. Others argue that it is more likely that these reflected the faith of the manufacturers in Egypt rather than the buyers in Nubia.

Certain conversion came with a series of 6th-century missions. The Byzantine Empire dispatched an official party to try to convert the kingdoms to Chalcedonian Christianity, but Empress Theodora reportedly conspired to delay the party to allow a group of Miaphysites to arrive first. John of Ephesus reports that the Monophysites successfully converted the kingdoms of Nobatia and Alodia, but that Makuria remained hostile. John of Biclarum states that Makuria then embraced the rival Byzantine Melkite Christianity. Archaeological evidence seems to point to a rapid conversion brought about by an official adoption of the new faith. Millennia-old traditions such as the building of elaborate tombs, and the burying of expensive grave goods with the dead were abandoned, and temples throughout the region seem to have been converted to churches. Churches eventually were built in virtually every town and village.

After this point the exact course of Makurian Christianity is much disputed. It is clear that by c. 710 Makuria had become officially Coptic and loyal to the Coptic patriarch of Alexandria; the king of Makuria became the defender of the patriarch of Alexandria, occasionally intervening militarily to protect him, as Kyriakos did in 722. This same period saw Melkite Makuria absorb the Coptic Nobatia, historians have long wondered why the conquering state adopted the religion of its rival. It is fairly clear that Egyptian Coptic influence was far stronger in the region, and that Byzantine power was fading, and this might have played a role. Historians are also divided on whether this was the end of the Melkite/Coptic split as there is some evidence that a Melkite minority persisted until the end of the kingdom.

==== Church infrastructure ====
The Makurian church was divided into seven bishoprics: Kalabsha, Qupta, Qasr Ibrim, Faras, Sai, Dongola, and Suenkur. Unlike Ethiopia, it appears that no national church was established and all seven bishops reported directly to the Coptic patriarch of Alexandria. The bishops were appointed by the patriarch, not the king, though they seem to have largely been local Nubians rather than Egyptians.

==== Monasticism ====
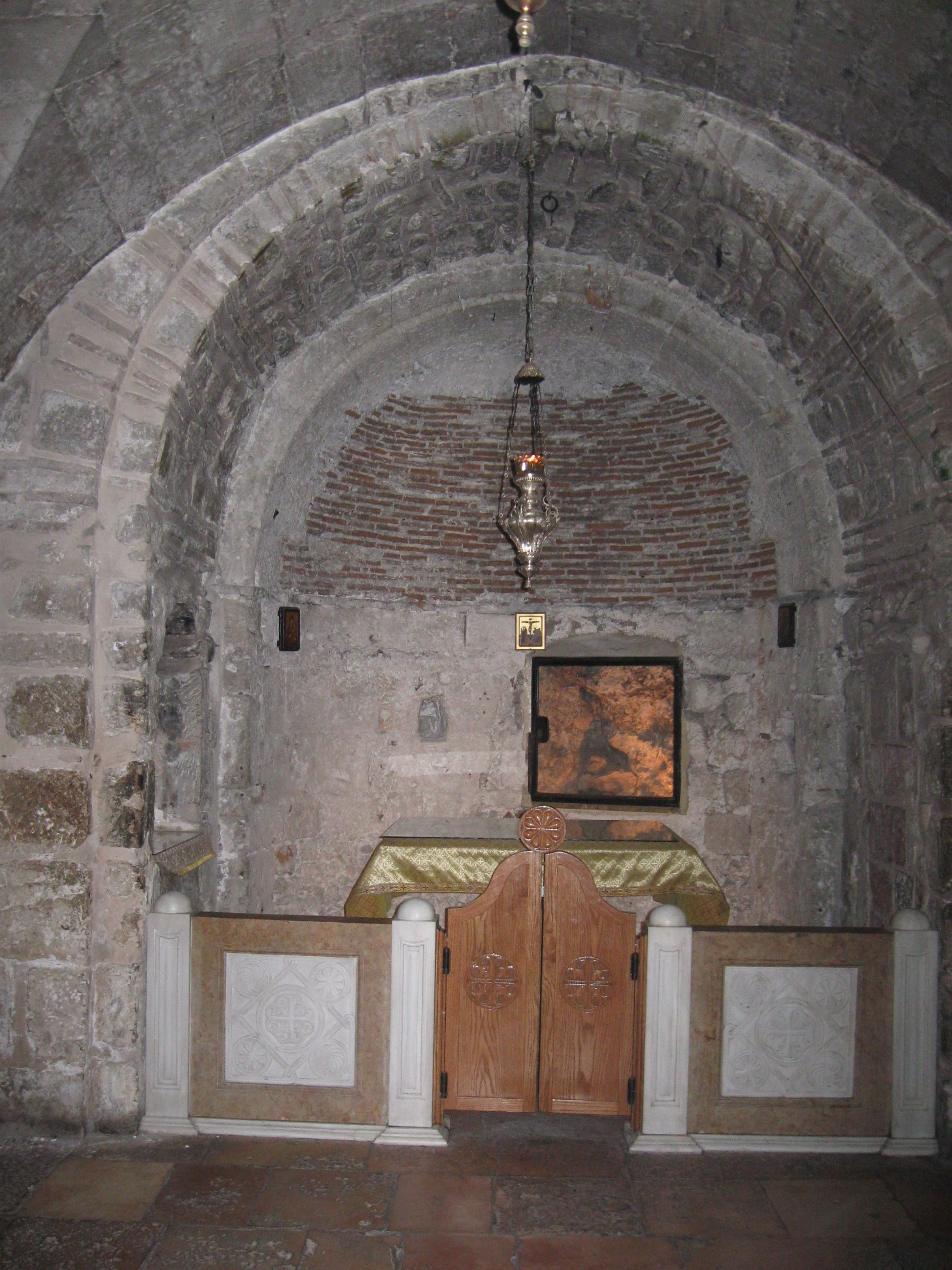
The Adam chapel of the Church of the Holy Sepulchre in Jerusalem, which during the Crusades was owned by Nubian monks.

Unlike in Egypt, there is not much evidence for monasticism in Makuria. According to Adams there are only three archaeological sites that are certainly monastic. All three are fairly small and quite Coptic, leading to the possibility that they were set up by Egyptian refugees rather than indigenous Makurians. Since the 10th/11th century the Nubians had their own monastery in the Egyptian Wadi El Natrun valley.

=== Islam ===
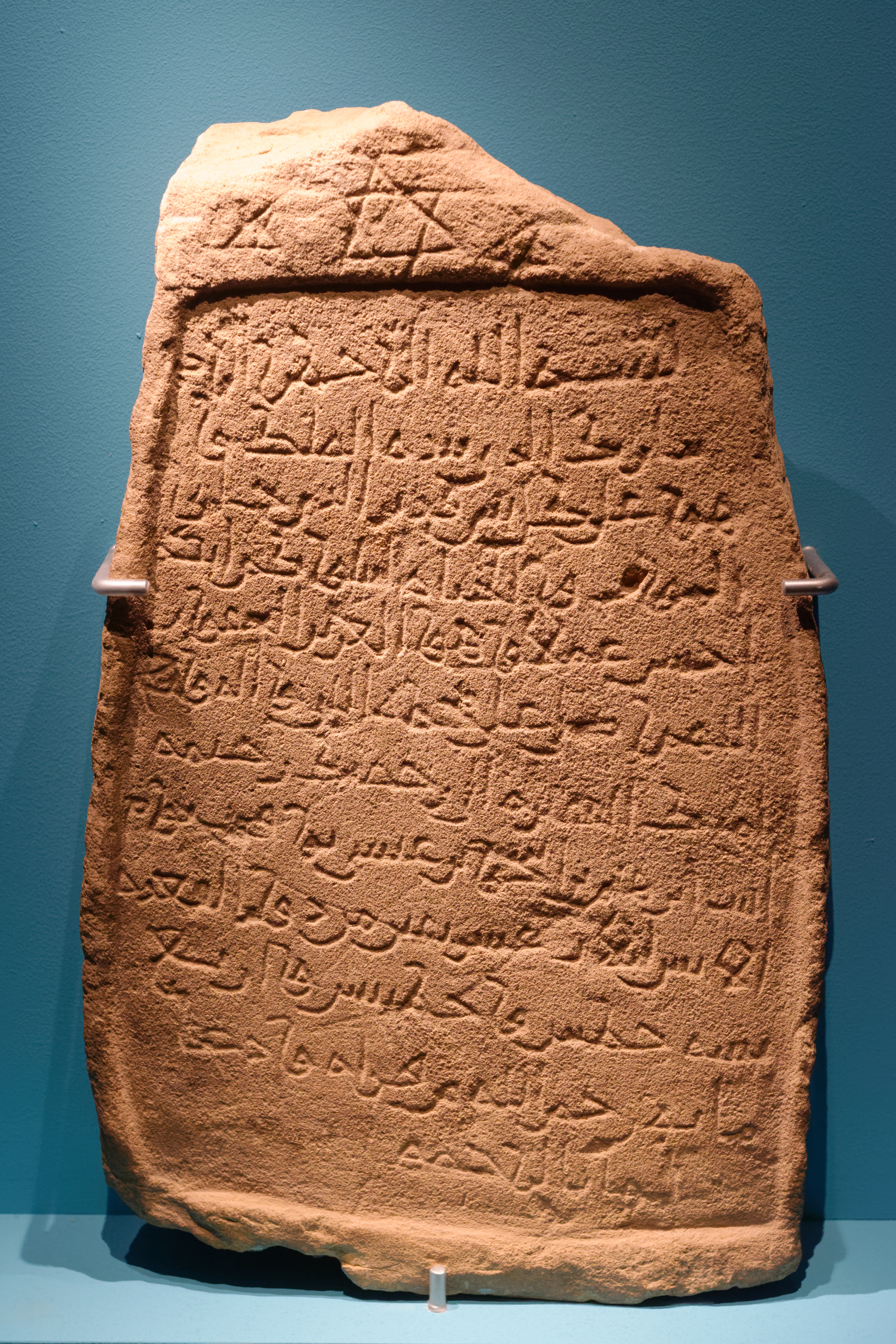
Muslim tombstone from Meinarti (11th century)

The Baqt guaranteed the security of Muslims travelling in Makuria, but prohibited their settlement in the kingdom. However, the latter point was, not maintained: Muslim migrants, probably merchants and artisans, are confirmed to have settled in Lower Nubia from the 9th century and to have intermarried with the locals, thus laying the foundation for a small Muslim population as far south as the Batn el-Hajar. Arabic documents from Qasr Ibrim confirm that these Muslims had their own communal judiciary, but still regarded the Eparch of Nobatia as their suzerain. It seems likely that they had own mosques, though none have been identified archaeologically, with a possible exception being in Gebel Adda.

In Dongola, there was no larger number of Muslims until the end of the 13th century. Before that date, Muslim residents were limited to merchants and diplomats. In the late 10th century, when al-Aswani came to Dongola, there was, despite being demanded in the Baqt, still no mosque; he and around 60 other Muslims had to pray outside of the city. It is not until 1317, with the conversion of the throne hall by Abdallah Barshambu, when a mosque is firmly attested. While the Jizya, the Islamic head tax enforced on non-Muslims, was established after the Mamluk invasion of 1276 and Makuria was periodically governed by Muslim kings since Abdallah Barshambu, the majority of the Nubians remained Christian. The actual Islamization of Nubia began in the late 14th century, with the arrival of the first in a series of Muslim teachers propagating Islam.

== Economy ==
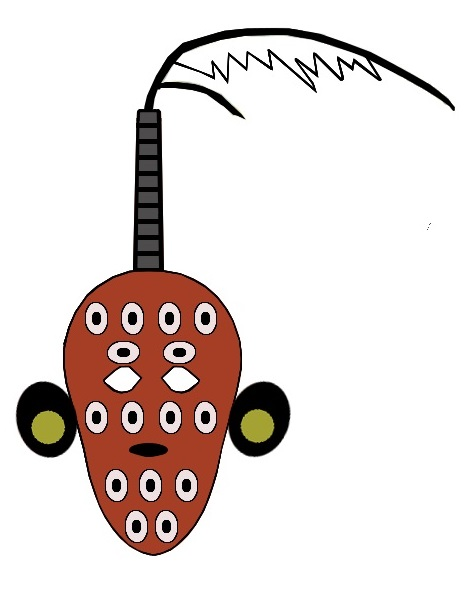
A Makurian dancing mask as depicted on a mural from Dongola.

The main economic activity in Makuria was agriculture, with farmers growing several crops a year of barley, millet, and dates. The methods used were generally the same that had been used for millennia. Small plots of well irrigated land were lined along the banks of the Nile, which would be fertilized by the river's annual flooding. One important technological advance was the saqiya, an oxen-powered water wheel, that was introduced in the Roman period and helped increase yields and population density. Settlement patterns indicate that land was divided into individual plots rather than as in a manorial system. The peasants lived in small villages composed of clustered houses of sun-dried brick.

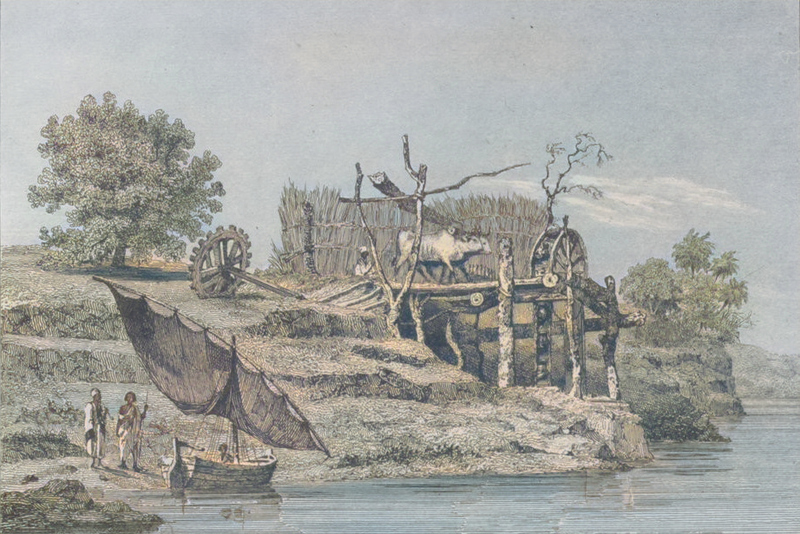
A Nubian saqiya wheel in the 19th century

Important industries included the production of pottery, based at Faras, and weaving based at Dongola. Smaller local industries include leatherworking, metalworking, and the widespread production of baskets, mats, and sandals from palm fibre. Also important was the gold mined in the Red Sea Hills to the east of Makuria.

Cattle were of great economic importance. It is possible that their breeding and marketing was controlled by the central administration. A great assemblage of 13th century cattle bones from Old Dongola has been linked with a mass slaughter by the invading Mamluks, who attempted to weaken the Makurian economy.

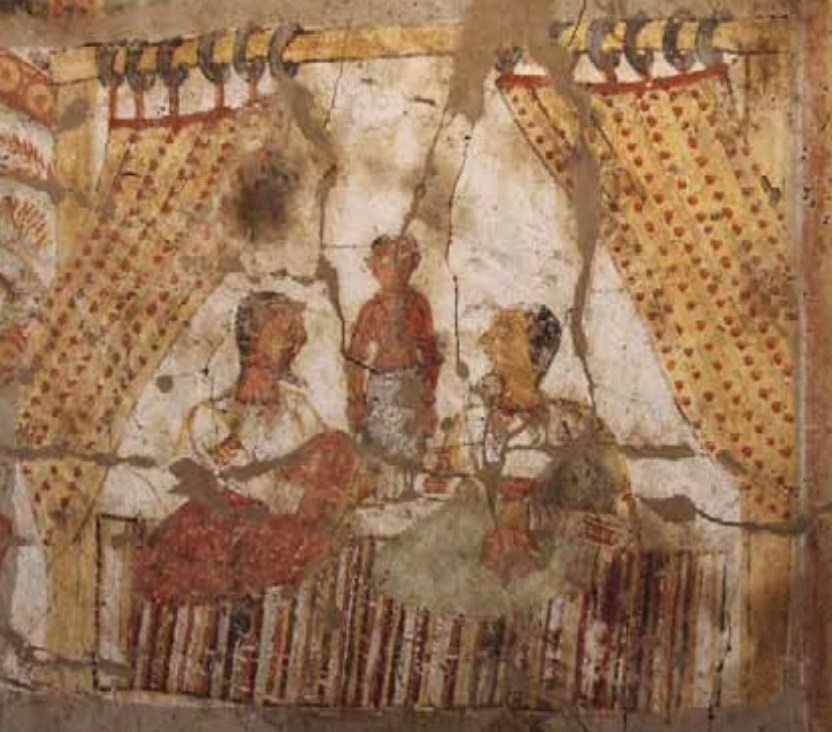
Financial transaction scene from Dongola (12th century)

Makurian trade was largely by barter as the state never adopted a currency, though Egyptian coins were common in the north. Makurian trade with Egypt was of great importance. From Egypt a wide array of luxury and manufactured goods were imported. The main Makurian export was slaves. The slaves sent north were not from Makuria itself, but rather from further south and west in Africa. Little is known about Makurian trade and relations with other parts of Africa. There is some archaeological evidence of contacts and trade with the areas to the west, especially Kordofan. Additionally, contacts to Darfur and Kanem-Bornu seem probable, but there are only few evidences. There seem to have been important political relations between Makuria and Christian Ethiopia to the south-east. For instance, in the 10th century, Georgios II successfully intervened on behalf of the unnamed ruler at that time, and persuaded Patriarch Philotheos of Alexandria to at last ordain an abuna, or metropolitan, for the Ethiopian Orthodox Church. However, there is little evidence of much other interaction between the two Christian states.

== Contact with Latin Europe ==
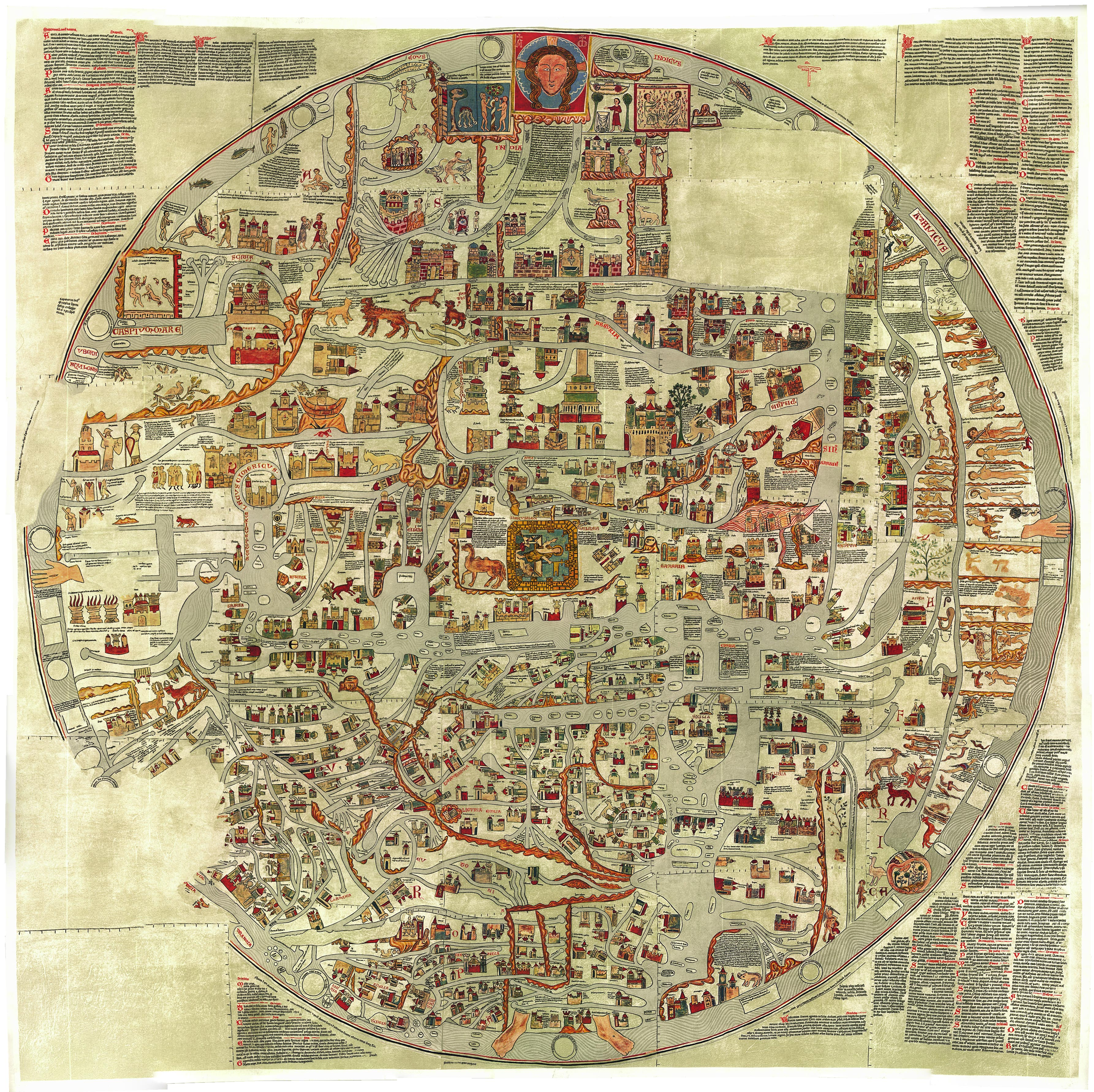
Growing aware of Christian Nubia, the Europeans included it in their cartography between the 12th and 15th centuries. The peak of this awareness marked the Ebstorf map of c. 1300. The legend concerning Nubia reads: “The people who live here are called the Nubians. This people always go naked. (Note: The claim of complete nakedness should not be taken for a fact, as it reflects an ancient stereotype.) They are honest and devout Christians. They are rich in gold and live on trade. They have three kings and the same number of bishops. (Note: This might be a reference to the original three kingdoms of Nobatia, Makuria and Alodia, unless the author was implying the semi-autonomous status of Nobatia within Makuria.) They pay frequent visits to Jerusalem in vast crowds, carrying with them a lot of wealth which is offered to the Sepulchre of the Lord.”

Thanks to the crusades western Europe grew increasingly aware of the existence of Christian Nubia during the 12th and 13th centuries. By the early 14th century there were even proposals to ally with the Nubians for another crusade against the Mamluks. Nubian characters also start to be featured in crusader songs, first displayed as Muslims and later, after the 12th century and with increasing knowledge of Nubia, as Christians. Contacts between crusaders and western pilgrims on the one side and Nubians on the other occurred in Jerusalem, where European accounts from the 12th–14th centuries attest the existence of a Nubian community, and also, if not primarily in Egypt, where many Nubians were living and where European merchants were highly active. Perhaps there also existed a Nubian community in crusader-controlled Famagusta, Cyprus. In the mid-14th century pilgrim Niccolò da Poggibonsi claimed that the Nubians had sympathies for the Latins and hence the Mamluk Sultan did not allow Latins to travel to Nubia as he was afraid that they might convince the Nubians to start a war, although in the contemporary Book of Knowledge of All Kingdoms it was written that Genoese traders were present in Dongola. A text was found in Qasr Ibrim apparently mixing Nubian with Italian as well as a Catalan playing card. An inscription written in Provencal from the second half of the 13th century/14th century was found in Banganarti.

== See also ==
- List of rulers of Makuria
- History of Sudan
