= Min Naiben =

Chinese physicist and politician (1935–2018)

- 闵乃本
- Born: 9 August 1935; Rugao, Jiangsu, China
- Died: 16 September 2018 (aged 83); Nanjing, Jiangsu, China
- Education: Nanjing University; Tohoku University
- Awards: TWAS Prize (1999); Ho Leung Ho Lee Prize; First Prize of National Natural Science (2006)
- Scientific career
- Fields: Crystallography
- Workplaces: Nanjing University
- Academic advisors: Feng Duan

Min Naiben (simplified Chinese: 闵乃本; traditional Chinese: 閔乃本; pinyin: Mǐn Nǎiběn; 9 August 1935 – 16 September 2018), also known as Nai-Ben Ming, was a Chinese materials scientist, physicist, and politician. He was a Standing Committee member of the 9th Central Committee of the Jiusan Society and vice-president of the 10th and 11th Central Committee of the Jiusan Society.

== Biography ==
Min was born in Rugao, Jiangsu, on August 9, 1935. After graduating from Shanghai Advanced Mechanical Vocational School (now University of Shanghai for Science and Technology) in 1954, he studied and then taught at Nanjing University. In 1982 he was hired as an associate visiting professor at the University of Utah. In 1986 he became a guest professor at Tohoku University. In 1986, Min was appointed as the group leader of Physics Group of the National Natural Science Foundation of China, a position in which he remained until 1992. In 1990–1991 he taught as a guest professor at the University of Alabama. He joined the Jiusan Society in 1995. He was elected an academician of the Chinese Academy of Sciences in 1991 and a fellow of The World Academy of Sciences in 2001.

On September 16, 2018, he died of an illness in Nanjing, Jiangsu.

== Papers ==
- Min Naiben (1993). "Defect Mechanism of Crystal Growth and Their Kinetics". Journal of Crystal Growth. 128 (1–4): 104–112. Bibcode:1993JCrGr.128..104M. doi:10.1016/0022-0248(93)90303-E.
- Min Naiben (1999). "Superlattices and Microstructures of Dielectric Materials". Advanced Materials. 11 (13): 1079–1089. doi:10.1002/(SICI)1521-4095(199909)11:13<1079::AID-ADMA1079>3.0.CO;2-5.
- Min Naiben; Y. Y. Zhu (1992). "Ultrasonic Excitation and Propagation in an Acoustic Superlattice". J. Appl. Phys. 72 (3). 1992: 904–914. Bibcode:1992JAP....72..904Z. doi:10.1063/1.351766.
- Min Naiben; M. H. Lu; C. Zhang; L. Feng; J. Zhao; Y. F. Chen; Y. W. Mao; J. Zi; Y. Y. Zhu; S. N. Zhu (2007). "Negative Birefraction of Acoustic Waves in a Sonic Crystal". Nature Materials. 6 (10): 744–748. Bibcode:2007NatMa...6..744L. doi:10.1038/nmat1987. PMID 17721539.
- Min Naiben; Y. Q. Lu; Y. Y. Zhu; Y. F. Chen; S. N. Zhu; Y. J. Feng (1999). "Optical Properties of an Ionic type Phononic Crystal" (PDF). Science. 284 (5421): 1822–1824. doi:10.1126/science.284.5421.1822. PMID 10364551. S2CID 34650474. Archived from the original (PDF) on 2020-01-10.
- Min Naiben; S. N. Zhu; Y. Y. Zhu (1997). "QuasiPhasematched Thirdharmonicgeneration in a Quasiperiodic Optical Superlattice". Science. 278: 843–846.
- Min Naiben; Y. L. Lu; T. Wei; F. Duewer; Y. Q. Lu; P. G. Schultz; X. D. Xiang (1997). "Nondestruct ive Imaging of Dielectric Constant Profiles and Ferroelectric Domains with a Scanning tip Microwave Near field Microscope". Science. 276 (5321): 2004–2006. CiteSeerX 10.1.1.706.4836. doi:10.1126/science.276.5321.2004.
- Min Naiben; M. Wang; W. J. Pvan Enckevort; P. Bennema (1994). "Formation of a Mesh like Electrodeposition Induced by Electroconvection". Nature. 367 (6462): 438–441. Bibcode:1994Natur.367..438W. doi:10.1038/367438a0. S2CID 4333661.

== Awards and honors ==
- 1999 TWAS Prize for Physics, "for design and fabrication of periodic and quasiperiodic dielectric superlattices and realization of second harmonic generation (SHG), multiple wavelength SHG, third harmonic generation, optical stability, polariton excitation, and ultrasonic generation with high frequency".
- Ho Leung Ho Lee Prize for Physics
- 2006 First Prize of National Natural Science
- Asteroid 199953 Mingnaiben, discovered by the PMO NEO Survey Program in 2007, was named in his honor. The official naming citation was published by the Minor Planet Center on 22 July 2013 (M.P.C. 84382).
