= Laboratory of Solid State Microstructure, Nanjing University =

Facility in Nanjing, China

Laboratory of Solid State Microstructure (LSSMS, Chinese: 固体微结构物理国家重点实验室) is located in Nanjing University, China. It is a key laboratory in physics, associated with such faculties as schools of physics and electronics and department of materials of engineering school at Nanjing University.

The Laboratory has accomplished many achievements and enjoys international fame. Nature magazine listed it as one of the two best research groups approaching/with world-class standards in East Asia apart from Japan. The Institute for Scientific Information listed it as the No. 1 laboratory in China as published in Science magazine.

== History ==
- In 1984, Nanjing University Institute of Solid State Physics was changed to State Key Laboratory of Solid State Microstructures of Nanjing University, which was mainly associated with the Department of Physics of Nanjing University at the time.
- Nanjing National Laboratory of Microstructures, which mainly based upon LSSMS and LCC (State Key Laboratory of Coordination Chemistry) at Nanjing University, was formally started to establish in 2006, with estimated investment of RMB 300 million, and before that, in 2004, NU received endowment of RMB 50 million from Cyrus Tang Foundation for its establishment, and the National Microstructures Laboratory Building - Cyrus Tang Building, was completed in 2007.

== Research areas ==
- Physics of microstructured dielectric materials
- Nano-structured materials and physics
- Aggregations and pattern formation under non-equilibrium conditions
- Dynamics of microstructural assembly and modulation
- Strong correlation effect in solids
- Phase transitions
- Other related microstructural physics in solids

== Notable scientists ==
- Feng Duan
- Ming Naiben
