= Meanings of minor-planet names: 199001–200000 =

As minor planet discoveries are confirmed, they are given a permanent number by the IAU's Minor Planet Center (MPC), and the discoverers can then submit names for them, following the IAU's naming conventions. The list below concerns those minor planets in the specified number-range that have received names, and explains the meanings of those names.

Official naming citations of newly named small Solar System bodies are approved and published in a bulletin by IAU's Working Group for Small Bodies Nomenclature (WGSBN). Before May 2021, citations were published in MPC's Minor Planet Circulars for many decades. Recent citations can also be found on the JPL Small-Body Database (SBDB). Until his death in 2016, German astronomer Lutz D. Schmadel compiled these citations into the Dictionary of Minor Planet Names (DMP) and regularly updated the collection.

Based on Paul Herget's The Names of the Minor Planets, Schmadel also researched the unclear origin of numerous asteroids, most of which had been named prior to World War II. This article incorporates text from this source, which is in the public domain: SBDB New namings may only be added to this list below after official publication as the preannouncement of names is condemned. The WGSBN publishes a comprehensive guideline for the naming rules of non-cometary small Solar System bodies.

== 199001–199100 ==
| Named minor planet | Provisional | This minor planet was named for... | Ref · Catalog |
|---|---|---|---|
There are no named minor planets in this number range

== 199101–199200 ==
back to top

| Named minor planet | Provisional | This minor planet was named for... | Ref · Catalog |
|---|---|---|---|
| 199194 Calcatreppola | 2006 AO | Eryngium maritimum also known as Calcatreppola marittima, is a plant that can be found near seashores in Sardinia, Italy. The island's inhabitants name it "Corra de screu". | JPL · 199194 |

== 199201–199300 ==
back to top

| Named minor planet | Provisional | This minor planet was named for... | Ref · Catalog |
|---|---|---|---|
| 199261 Cassandralejoly | 2006 BN_{12} | Cassandra Lejoly (b. 1992), a Belgian-American astronomer. | IAU · 199261 |

== 199301–199400 ==
back to top

| Named minor planet | Provisional | This minor planet was named for... | Ref · Catalog |
|---|---|---|---|
There are no named minor planets in this number range

== 199401–199500 ==
back to top

| Named minor planet | Provisional | This minor planet was named for... | Ref · Catalog |
|---|---|---|---|
There are no named minor planets in this number range

== 199501–199600 ==
back to top

| Named minor planet | Provisional | This minor planet was named for... | Ref · Catalog |
|---|---|---|---|
| 199574 Webbert | 2006 EX_{67} | Richard Webbert (born 1959), a senior electrical engineer at the Johns Hopkins University Applied Physics Laboratory, who worked for the New Horizons mission to Pluto as the Power Systems Lead | JPL · 199574 |

== 199601–199700 ==
back to top

| Named minor planet | Provisional | This minor planet was named for... | Ref · Catalog |
|---|---|---|---|
| 199630 Szitkay | 2006 GS | Gábor Szitkay (b. 1964), a Hungarian amateur astronomer and astrophotographer. | IAU · 199630 |
| 199631 Giuseppesprizzi | 2006 GX | Giuseppe Sprizzi (born 1973), son-in-law of Italian amateur astronomer Vincenzo Casulli who discovered this minor planet | JPL · 199631 |
| 199632 Mahlerede | 2006 GX_{1} | Ede Mahler (1857–1945), a Hungarian-Austrian orientalist, astronomer and archaeologist. | IAU · 199632 |
| 199677 Terzani | 2006 HH_{6} | Tiziano Terzani (1938–2004), Italian writer and journalist | JPL · 199677 |
| 199687 Erősszsolt | 2006 HA_{18} | Zsolt Erőss (1968–2013), the most successful Hungarian high-altitude mountaineer | JPL · 199687 |
| 199688 Kisspéter | 2006 HK_{18} | Péter Kiss (1986–2013), the first Hungarian mountaineer, who scaled all 82 four-thousanders in the Alps | JPL · 199688 |
| 199696 Kemenesi | 2006 HD_{31} | Gábor Kemenesi (b. 1987), a Hungarian biologist and virus researcher. | IAU · 199696 |

== 199701–199800 ==
back to top

| Named minor planet | Provisional | This minor planet was named for... | Ref · Catalog |
|---|---|---|---|
| 199741 Weidner | 2006 HC_{152} | Scott E. Weidner (born 1961), an Assistant Vice President for Engineering at Princeton University, who worked for the New Horizons mission to Pluto as a SWAP Instrument Project Manager | JPL · 199741 |
| 199757 Shagunsingh | 2006 JB_{45} | Shagun Singh (b. 1991), an American physician. | IAU · 199757 |
| 199763 Davidgregory | 2006 JJ_{77} | David Arthur Gregory (born 1951), a Canadian physician in St. Thomas, Ontario, who is an expert and collector of meteorites | JPL · 199763 |

== 199801–199900 ==
back to top

| Named minor planet | Provisional | This minor planet was named for... | Ref · Catalog |
|---|---|---|---|
| 199838 Hafili | 2007 EY_{38} | Mohamed Ali Hafili (born 1980), a Moroccan amateur astronomer from Marrakesh who has organized several astronomical events in Morocco such as festivals, school stargazing and astronomical trips in the desert | JPL · 199838 |
| 199900 Brunoganz | 2007 GA_{1} | Bruno Ganz (1941–2019), a Swiss actor of theater and cinema | JPL · 199900 |

== 199901–200000 ==
back to top

| Named minor planet | Provisional | This minor planet was named for... | Ref · Catalog |
|---|---|---|---|
| 199947 Qaidam | 2007 HR_{7} | Qaidam, meaning salt marshes in Mongolian, located in the north of Qinghai-Tibet Plateau, is one of the China's four big basins and the main region of Haixi Mongolian-Tibetan Autonomous Prefecture | JPL · 199947 |
| 199950 Sierpc | 2007 HK_{16} | Sierpc, one of the oldest towns in the Mazovie Region of Poland | JPL · 199950 |
| 199953 Mingnaiben | 2007 HK_{28} | Min Naiben (1935–2018), a Chinese physicist, materials scientist, professor at Nanjing University, and an academician of the Chinese Academy of Sciences | JPL · 199953 |
| 199986 Chervone | 2007 JD_{21} | The Ukrainian village of Chervone, where airplanes had been manufactured, is located near the discovering Andrushivka Astronomical Observatory | JPL · 199986 |
| 199991 Adriencoffinet | 2007 JX_{24} | Adrien Coffinet (born 1990), a French astrophysicist and former exoplanet hunter at Geneva Observatory, who now works as a science journalist for Futura-Sciences (Src). | IAU · 199991 |
| 199999 Nickgrossman | 2007 JZ_{39} | Nathaniel “Nick” Grossman, American mathematician and Professor Emeritus at UCLA. | IAU · 199999 |
| 200000 Danielparrott | 2007 JT_{40} | Daniel Parrott (born 1987) is an American amateur astronomer and computer programmer. Parrott authored the software Tycho for asteroid discovery and follow up which is in wide use among amateur and professional astronomers. | IAU · 200000 |

back to top

| Preceded by 198,001–199,000 | Meanings of minor-planet names List of minor planets: 199,001–200,000 | Succeeded by 200,001–201,000 |
