= List of minor planets: 199001–200000 =

The following is a partial list of minor planets, running from minor-planet number 199001 through 200000, inclusive. The primary data for this and other partial lists is based on JPL's "Small-Body Orbital Elements" and data available from the Minor Planet Center. Critical list information is also provided by the MPC, unless otherwise specified from Lowell Observatory. A detailed description of the table's columns and additional sources are given on the main page including a complete list of every page in this series, and a statistical break-up on the dynamical classification of minor planets.

Also see the summary list of all named bodies in numerical and alphabetical order, and the corresponding naming citations for the number range of this particular list. New namings may only be added to this list after official publication, as the preannouncement of names is condemned by the Working Group for Small Bodies Nomenclature of the International Astronomical Union.

Near-Earth obj.	MBA (inner)	MBA (outer)	Centaur
Mars-crosser	MBA (middle)	Jupiter trojan	Trans-Neptunian obj.
Unclassified

== 199001–199100 ==
Designation			Discovery			Properties		Ref
Permanent	Provisional	Named after	Date	Site	Discoverer(s)	Category	Diam.	Ref
199001	2005 WM_{51}	—	November 25, 2005	Kitt Peak	Spacewatch	·	850 m	MPC · JPL
199002	2005 WO_{55}	—	November 28, 2005	Junk Bond	D. Healy	·	1.1 km	MPC · JPL
199003	2005 WJ_{56}	—	November 29, 2005	Socorro	LINEAR	ATE +1km · PHA	830 m	MPC · JPL
199004	2005 WM_{66}	—	November 22, 2005	Kitt Peak	Spacewatch	·	1.3 km	MPC · JPL
199005	2005 WH_{67}	—	November 22, 2005	Kitt Peak	Spacewatch	CLA	2.5 km	MPC · JPL
199006	2005 WY_{68}	—	November 25, 2005	Mount Lemmon	Mount Lemmon Survey	·	1.1 km	MPC · JPL
199007	2005 WH_{70}	—	November 26, 2005	Mount Lemmon	Mount Lemmon Survey	MAS	990 m	MPC · JPL
199008	2005 WP_{72}	—	November 25, 2005	Kitt Peak	Spacewatch	·	1.2 km	MPC · JPL
199009	2005 WU_{73}	—	November 26, 2005	Mount Lemmon	Mount Lemmon Survey	·	870 m	MPC · JPL
199010	2005 WK_{80}	—	November 25, 2005	Mount Lemmon	Mount Lemmon Survey	·	1.1 km	MPC · JPL
199011	2005 WZ_{86}	—	November 28, 2005	Mount Lemmon	Mount Lemmon Survey	MAS	1.1 km	MPC · JPL
199012	2005 WS_{87}	—	November 28, 2005	Mount Lemmon	Mount Lemmon Survey	·	1.4 km	MPC · JPL
199013	2005 WJ_{89}	—	November 25, 2005	Mount Lemmon	Mount Lemmon Survey	·	1.3 km	MPC · JPL
199014	2005 WS_{89}	—	November 26, 2005	Catalina	CSS	·	1.1 km	MPC · JPL
199015	2005 WF_{91}	—	November 28, 2005	Catalina	CSS	·	2.8 km	MPC · JPL
199016	2005 WF_{92}	—	November 25, 2005	Mount Lemmon	Mount Lemmon Survey	(2076)	1.3 km	MPC · JPL
199017	2005 WS_{93}	—	November 25, 2005	Mount Lemmon	Mount Lemmon Survey	·	1.7 km	MPC · JPL
199018	2005 WB_{94}	—	November 26, 2005	Kitt Peak	Spacewatch	·	1.2 km	MPC · JPL
199019	2005 WG_{95}	—	November 26, 2005	Kitt Peak	Spacewatch	·	1.7 km	MPC · JPL
199020	2005 WA_{98}	—	November 26, 2005	Kitt Peak	Spacewatch	NYS	1.9 km	MPC · JPL
199021	2005 WB_{98}	—	November 26, 2005	Kitt Peak	Spacewatch	·	1.3 km	MPC · JPL
199022	2005 WD_{99}	—	November 28, 2005	Mount Lemmon	Mount Lemmon Survey	V	860 m	MPC · JPL
199023	2005 WR_{101}	—	November 29, 2005	Socorro	LINEAR	·	910 m	MPC · JPL
199024	2005 WZ_{103}	—	November 28, 2005	Catalina	CSS	·	2.2 km	MPC · JPL
199025	2005 WO_{104}	—	November 28, 2005	Catalina	CSS	·	860 m	MPC · JPL
199026	2005 WC_{105}	—	November 29, 2005	Catalina	CSS	·	1.1 km	MPC · JPL
199027	2005 WZ_{116}	—	November 30, 2005	Socorro	LINEAR	·	4.0 km	MPC · JPL
199028	2005 WT_{117}	—	November 28, 2005	Socorro	LINEAR	·	1.1 km	MPC · JPL
199029	2005 WX_{118}	—	November 25, 2005	Mount Lemmon	Mount Lemmon Survey	·	1.1 km	MPC · JPL
199030	2005 WQ_{135}	—	November 25, 2005	Mount Lemmon	Mount Lemmon Survey	·	790 m	MPC · JPL
199031	2005 WX_{136}	—	November 26, 2005	Mount Lemmon	Mount Lemmon Survey	·	980 m	MPC · JPL
199032	2005 WT_{138}	—	November 26, 2005	Mount Lemmon	Mount Lemmon Survey	·	1.5 km	MPC · JPL
199033	2005 WU_{139}	—	November 26, 2005	Mount Lemmon	Mount Lemmon Survey	·	1.6 km	MPC · JPL
199034	2005 WU_{141}	—	November 28, 2005	Mount Lemmon	Mount Lemmon Survey	·	4.2 km	MPC · JPL
199035	2005 WC_{143}	—	November 30, 2005	Kitt Peak	Spacewatch	·	2.1 km	MPC · JPL
199036	2005 WY_{148}	—	November 28, 2005	Kitt Peak	Spacewatch	·	1.5 km	MPC · JPL
199037	2005 WB_{149}	—	November 28, 2005	Kitt Peak	Spacewatch	V	1.1 km	MPC · JPL
199038	2005 WC_{151}	—	November 28, 2005	Socorro	LINEAR	·	940 m	MPC · JPL
199039	2005 WL_{154}	—	November 29, 2005	Kitt Peak	Spacewatch	·	2.0 km	MPC · JPL
199040	2005 WS_{154}	—	November 29, 2005	Kitt Peak	Spacewatch	·	930 m	MPC · JPL
199041	2005 WY_{156}	—	November 30, 2005	Kitt Peak	Spacewatch	·	970 m	MPC · JPL
199042	2005 WB_{157}	—	November 22, 2005	Kitt Peak	Spacewatch	·	1.0 km	MPC · JPL
199043	2005 WH_{157}	—	November 25, 2005	Catalina	CSS	·	1.0 km	MPC · JPL
199044	2005 WU_{157}	—	November 25, 2005	Mount Lemmon	Mount Lemmon Survey	·	1.4 km	MPC · JPL
199045	2005 WA_{158}	—	November 26, 2005	Mount Lemmon	Mount Lemmon Survey	·	930 m	MPC · JPL
199046	2005 WU_{158}	—	November 29, 2005	Socorro	LINEAR	·	1.3 km	MPC · JPL
199047	2005 WB_{167}	—	November 30, 2005	Kitt Peak	Spacewatch	·	820 m	MPC · JPL
199048	2005 WX_{174}	—	November 30, 2005	Kitt Peak	Spacewatch	·	1.6 km	MPC · JPL
199049	2005 WN_{178}	—	November 30, 2005	Kitt Peak	Spacewatch	·	3.4 km	MPC · JPL
199050	2005 WS_{185}	—	November 30, 2005	Socorro	LINEAR	·	1.4 km	MPC · JPL
199051	2005 WF_{188}	—	November 30, 2005	Kitt Peak	Spacewatch	·	1.4 km	MPC · JPL
199052	2005 WO_{188}	—	November 30, 2005	Kitt Peak	Spacewatch	·	2.9 km	MPC · JPL
199053	2005 WA_{195}	—	November 30, 2005	Socorro	LINEAR	·	820 m	MPC · JPL
199054	2005 WB_{195}	—	November 30, 2005	Socorro	LINEAR	·	920 m	MPC · JPL
199055	2005 WU_{195}	—	November 25, 2005	Mount Lemmon	Mount Lemmon Survey	V	680 m	MPC · JPL
199056	2005 WQ_{204}	—	November 25, 2005	Mount Lemmon	Mount Lemmon Survey	·	840 m	MPC · JPL
199057	2005 XT_{1}	—	December 4, 2005	Socorro	LINEAR	·	1.0 km	MPC · JPL
199058	2005 XC_{5}	—	December 5, 2005	Goodricke-Pigott	Goodricke-Pigott	·	1.3 km	MPC · JPL
199059	2005 XP_{6}	—	December 2, 2005	Mount Lemmon	Mount Lemmon Survey	·	1.2 km	MPC · JPL
199060	2005 XR_{7}	—	December 4, 2005	Socorro	LINEAR	·	1.7 km	MPC · JPL
199061	2005 XE_{13}	—	December 1, 2005	Kitt Peak	Spacewatch	·	1.1 km	MPC · JPL
199062	2005 XD_{15}	—	December 1, 2005	Kitt Peak	Spacewatch	V	930 m	MPC · JPL
199063	2005 XE_{16}	—	December 1, 2005	Kitt Peak	Spacewatch	·	1.1 km	MPC · JPL
199064	2005 XP_{16}	—	December 1, 2005	Kitt Peak	Spacewatch	·	870 m	MPC · JPL
199065	2005 XY_{19}	—	December 2, 2005	Kitt Peak	Spacewatch	NYS	1.4 km	MPC · JPL
199066	2005 XA_{22}	—	December 2, 2005	Socorro	LINEAR	·	1.9 km	MPC · JPL
199067	2005 XO_{32}	—	December 4, 2005	Kitt Peak	Spacewatch	·	1.2 km	MPC · JPL
199068	2005 XM_{40}	—	December 5, 2005	Mount Lemmon	Mount Lemmon Survey	·	2.2 km	MPC · JPL
199069	2005 XN_{41}	—	December 7, 2005	Socorro	LINEAR	·	720 m	MPC · JPL
199070	2005 XX_{45}	—	December 2, 2005	Kitt Peak	Spacewatch	·	2.0 km	MPC · JPL
199071	2005 XJ_{51}	—	December 2, 2005	Kitt Peak	Spacewatch	·	1.9 km	MPC · JPL
199072	2005 XR_{56}	—	December 5, 2005	Mount Lemmon	Mount Lemmon Survey	·	1.1 km	MPC · JPL
199073	2005 XV_{57}	—	December 1, 2005	Kitt Peak	Spacewatch	EOS	3.0 km	MPC · JPL
199074	2005 XQ_{63}	—	December 5, 2005	Mount Lemmon	Mount Lemmon Survey	·	1.4 km	MPC · JPL
199075	2005 XS_{65}	—	December 5, 2005	Socorro	LINEAR	·	910 m	MPC · JPL
199076	2005 XX_{65}	—	December 7, 2005	Socorro	LINEAR	·	1.3 km	MPC · JPL
199077	2005 XA_{68}	—	December 5, 2005	Kitt Peak	Spacewatch	·	3.6 km	MPC · JPL
199078	2005 XB_{74}	—	December 6, 2005	Kitt Peak	Spacewatch	·	1.1 km	MPC · JPL
199079	2005 XS_{77}	—	December 9, 2005	Socorro	LINEAR	CLA	3.3 km	MPC · JPL
199080	2005 XC_{78}	—	December 2, 2005	Mount Lemmon	Mount Lemmon Survey	·	1.0 km	MPC · JPL
199081	2005 XP_{79}	—	December 4, 2005	Kitt Peak	Spacewatch	·	3.9 km	MPC · JPL
199082	2005 XM_{82}	—	December 10, 2005	Kitt Peak	Spacewatch	·	1.1 km	MPC · JPL
199083	2005 XY_{91}	—	December 4, 2005	Catalina	CSS	·	1.2 km	MPC · JPL
199084	2005 XN_{104}	—	December 1, 2005	Kitt Peak	M. W. Buie	·	5.6 km	MPC · JPL
199085	2005 XO_{104}	—	December 1, 2005	Kitt Peak	M. W. Buie	·	2.8 km	MPC · JPL
199086	2005 XS_{114}	—	December 5, 2005	Mount Lemmon	Mount Lemmon Survey	·	2.0 km	MPC · JPL
199087	2005 XF_{115}	—	December 1, 2005	Kitt Peak	Spacewatch	·	2.8 km	MPC · JPL
199088	2005 XX_{116}	—	December 4, 2005	Kitt Peak	Spacewatch	·	610 m	MPC · JPL
199089	2005 YC_{7}	—	December 21, 2005	Catalina	CSS	·	960 m	MPC · JPL
199090	2005 YO_{7}	—	December 22, 2005	Kitt Peak	Spacewatch	MAS	890 m	MPC · JPL
199091	2005 YF_{10}	—	December 21, 2005	Kitt Peak	Spacewatch	·	1.3 km	MPC · JPL
199092	2005 YZ_{11}	—	December 21, 2005	Kitt Peak	Spacewatch	·	2.5 km	MPC · JPL
199093	2005 YX_{17}	—	December 23, 2005	Kitt Peak	Spacewatch	·	2.2 km	MPC · JPL
199094	2005 YD_{22}	—	December 24, 2005	Kitt Peak	Spacewatch	·	3.4 km	MPC · JPL
199095	2005 YO_{23}	—	December 24, 2005	Kitt Peak	Spacewatch	PHO	970 m	MPC · JPL
199096	2005 YF_{24}	—	December 24, 2005	Kitt Peak	Spacewatch	·	1.6 km	MPC · JPL
199097	2005 YU_{27}	—	December 22, 2005	Kitt Peak	Spacewatch	NYS	1.5 km	MPC · JPL
199098	2005 YN_{28}	—	December 22, 2005	Kitt Peak	Spacewatch	(5)	2.0 km	MPC · JPL
199099	2005 YH_{31}	—	December 22, 2005	Kitt Peak	Spacewatch	·	1.5 km	MPC · JPL
199100	2005 YL_{31}	—	December 22, 2005	Kitt Peak	Spacewatch	·	800 m	MPC · JPL

== 199101–199200 ==
back to top

Designation			Discovery			Properties		Ref
Permanent	Provisional	Named after	Date	Site	Discoverer(s)	Category	Diam.	Ref
199101	2005 YR_{31}	—	December 22, 2005	Kitt Peak	Spacewatch	·	970 m	MPC · JPL
199102	2005 YO_{34}	—	December 24, 2005	Kitt Peak	Spacewatch	·	1.9 km	MPC · JPL
199103	2005 YY_{35}	—	December 25, 2005	Kitt Peak	Spacewatch	·	1.5 km	MPC · JPL
199104	2005 YF_{43}	—	December 24, 2005	Kitt Peak	Spacewatch	·	1.0 km	MPC · JPL
199105	2005 YM_{43}	—	December 24, 2005	Kitt Peak	Spacewatch	·	1.1 km	MPC · JPL
199106	2005 YP_{46}	—	December 25, 2005	Kitt Peak	Spacewatch	·	970 m	MPC · JPL
199107	2005 YH_{47}	—	December 25, 2005	Kitt Peak	Spacewatch	MAS	1.0 km	MPC · JPL
199108	2005 YO_{47}	—	December 26, 2005	Kitt Peak	Spacewatch	·	1.5 km	MPC · JPL
199109	2005 YJ_{48}	—	December 22, 2005	Kitt Peak	Spacewatch	NYS	1.7 km	MPC · JPL
199110	2005 YJ_{49}	—	December 22, 2005	Kitt Peak	Spacewatch	·	1.6 km	MPC · JPL
199111	2005 YN_{49}	—	December 22, 2005	Kitt Peak	Spacewatch	·	1.1 km	MPC · JPL
199112	2005 YN_{50}	—	December 25, 2005	Kitt Peak	Spacewatch	NYS	1.8 km	MPC · JPL
199113	2005 YO_{56}	—	December 22, 2005	Kitt Peak	Spacewatch	NYS	1.4 km	MPC · JPL
199114	2005 YG_{58}	—	December 24, 2005	Kitt Peak	Spacewatch	·	6.3 km	MPC · JPL
199115	2005 YV_{60}	—	December 23, 2005	Kitt Peak	Spacewatch	·	1.4 km	MPC · JPL
199116	2005 YZ_{60}	—	December 23, 2005	Kitt Peak	Spacewatch	·	960 m	MPC · JPL
199117	2005 YC_{67}	—	December 26, 2005	Kitt Peak	Spacewatch	·	1.7 km	MPC · JPL
199118	2005 YV_{75}	—	December 24, 2005	Kitt Peak	Spacewatch	·	1.4 km	MPC · JPL
199119	2005 YF_{77}	—	December 24, 2005	Kitt Peak	Spacewatch	·	1.1 km	MPC · JPL
199120	2005 YX_{78}	—	December 24, 2005	Kitt Peak	Spacewatch	·	1.9 km	MPC · JPL
199121	2005 YG_{82}	—	December 24, 2005	Kitt Peak	Spacewatch	·	1.5 km	MPC · JPL
199122	2005 YT_{82}	—	December 24, 2005	Kitt Peak	Spacewatch	MAS	1.1 km	MPC · JPL
199123	2005 YW_{83}	—	December 24, 2005	Kitt Peak	Spacewatch	NYS	1.5 km	MPC · JPL
199124	2005 YQ_{90}	—	December 26, 2005	Mount Lemmon	Mount Lemmon Survey	·	1.5 km	MPC · JPL
199125	2005 YJ_{92}	—	December 27, 2005	Mount Lemmon	Mount Lemmon Survey	·	1.8 km	MPC · JPL
199126	2005 YA_{94}	—	December 26, 2005	Catalina	CSS	·	2.4 km	MPC · JPL
199127	2005 YF_{94}	—	December 26, 2005	Catalina	CSS	·	3.2 km	MPC · JPL
199128	2005 YG_{94}	—	December 27, 2005	Catalina	CSS	·	1.6 km	MPC · JPL
199129	2005 YN_{94}	—	December 21, 2005	Kitt Peak	Spacewatch	·	2.2 km	MPC · JPL
199130	2005 YJ_{95}	—	December 25, 2005	Kitt Peak	Spacewatch	·	3.5 km	MPC · JPL
199131	2005 YC_{96}	—	December 25, 2005	Kitt Peak	Spacewatch	·	900 m	MPC · JPL
199132	2005 YO_{96}	—	December 26, 2005	Kitt Peak	Spacewatch	·	910 m	MPC · JPL
199133	2005 YT_{98}	—	December 26, 2005	Kitt Peak	Spacewatch	·	1.1 km	MPC · JPL
199134	2005 YN_{100}	—	December 22, 2005	Kitt Peak	Spacewatch	·	1.7 km	MPC · JPL
199135	2005 YE_{107}	—	December 25, 2005	Mount Lemmon	Mount Lemmon Survey	·	840 m	MPC · JPL
199136	2005 YU_{107}	—	December 25, 2005	Kitt Peak	Spacewatch	·	1.1 km	MPC · JPL
199137	2005 YN_{108}	—	December 25, 2005	Kitt Peak	Spacewatch	·	1.9 km	MPC · JPL
199138	2005 YX_{112}	—	December 25, 2005	Mount Lemmon	Mount Lemmon Survey	·	1.4 km	MPC · JPL
199139	2005 YN_{116}	—	December 25, 2005	Kitt Peak	Spacewatch	·	1.2 km	MPC · JPL
199140	2005 YA_{117}	—	December 25, 2005	Kitt Peak	Spacewatch	·	2.0 km	MPC · JPL
199141	2005 YJ_{121}	—	December 28, 2005	Mount Lemmon	Mount Lemmon Survey	·	1 km	MPC · JPL
199142	2005 YB_{126}	—	December 26, 2005	Kitt Peak	Spacewatch	·	1.9 km	MPC · JPL
199143	2005 YC_{126}	—	December 26, 2005	Kitt Peak	Spacewatch	·	1.2 km	MPC · JPL
199144	2005 YL_{127}	—	December 28, 2005	Palomar	NEAT	·	1.1 km	MPC · JPL
199145	2005 YY_{128}	—	December 30, 2005	Kitt Peak	Spacewatch	APO · PHA	780 m	MPC · JPL
199146	2005 YQ_{136}	—	December 26, 2005	Kitt Peak	Spacewatch	·	1 km	MPC · JPL
199147	2005 YV_{136}	—	December 26, 2005	Kitt Peak	Spacewatch	·	1.3 km	MPC · JPL
199148	2005 YG_{143}	—	December 28, 2005	Mount Lemmon	Mount Lemmon Survey	·	1.9 km	MPC · JPL
199149	2005 YV_{145}	—	December 29, 2005	Socorro	LINEAR	·	970 m	MPC · JPL
199150	2005 YJ_{150}	—	December 25, 2005	Kitt Peak	Spacewatch	·	1 km	MPC · JPL
199151	2005 YC_{154}	—	December 29, 2005	Socorro	LINEAR	·	960 m	MPC · JPL
199152	2005 YG_{156}	—	December 26, 2005	Mount Lemmon	Mount Lemmon Survey	·	840 m	MPC · JPL
199153	2005 YP_{159}	—	December 27, 2005	Kitt Peak	Spacewatch	·	1.3 km	MPC · JPL
199154	2005 YV_{164}	—	December 29, 2005	Catalina	CSS	·	1.8 km	MPC · JPL
199155	2005 YH_{166}	—	December 27, 2005	Kitt Peak	Spacewatch	·	1.7 km	MPC · JPL
199156	2005 YL_{170}	—	December 31, 2005	Kitt Peak	Spacewatch	·	1.6 km	MPC · JPL
199157	2005 YN_{170}	—	December 31, 2005	Kitt Peak	Spacewatch	·	1.4 km	MPC · JPL
199158	2005 YG_{171}	—	December 30, 2005	Socorro	LINEAR	NYS	1.8 km	MPC · JPL
199159	2005 YW_{171}	—	December 22, 2005	Catalina	CSS	AEG	5.8 km	MPC · JPL
199160	2005 YD_{174}	—	December 28, 2005	Catalina	CSS	·	2.0 km	MPC · JPL
199161	2005 YV_{176}	—	December 22, 2005	Kitt Peak	Spacewatch	·	970 m	MPC · JPL
199162	2005 YC_{178}	—	December 22, 2005	Kitt Peak	Spacewatch	·	2.3 km	MPC · JPL
199163	2005 YN_{179}	—	December 27, 2005	Kitt Peak	Spacewatch	·	1.7 km	MPC · JPL
199164	2005 YB_{180}	—	December 27, 2005	Kitt Peak	Spacewatch	·	1.7 km	MPC · JPL
199165	2005 YK_{180}	—	December 30, 2005	7300 Observatory	W. K. Y. Yeung	·	1.1 km	MPC · JPL
199166	2005 YS_{180}	—	December 21, 2005	Catalina	CSS	·	1.8 km	MPC · JPL
199167	2005 YH_{182}	—	December 30, 2005	7300 Observatory	W. K. Y. Yeung	slow	2.0 km	MPC · JPL
199168	2005 YP_{184}	—	December 27, 2005	Mount Lemmon	Mount Lemmon Survey	NYS	1.3 km	MPC · JPL
199169	2005 YZ_{200}	—	December 22, 2005	Kitt Peak	Spacewatch	·	2.3 km	MPC · JPL
199170	2005 YK_{202}	—	December 25, 2005	Kitt Peak	Spacewatch	·	4.2 km	MPC · JPL
199171	2005 YD_{204}	—	December 25, 2005	Mount Lemmon	Mount Lemmon Survey	MAS	1.1 km	MPC · JPL
199172	2005 YH_{204}	—	December 25, 2005	Mount Lemmon	Mount Lemmon Survey	NYS	1.5 km	MPC · JPL
199173	2005 YU_{211}	—	December 28, 2005	Catalina	CSS	·	1.7 km	MPC · JPL
199174	2005 YR_{212}	—	December 29, 2005	Socorro	LINEAR	·	1.7 km	MPC · JPL
199175	2005 YN_{213}	—	December 29, 2005	Palomar	NEAT	·	2.0 km	MPC · JPL
199176	2005 YW_{216}	—	December 29, 2005	Kitt Peak	Spacewatch	·	1.1 km	MPC · JPL
199177	2005 YU_{219}	—	December 30, 2005	Socorro	LINEAR	·	2.2 km	MPC · JPL
199178	2005 YY_{220}	—	December 22, 2005	Catalina	CSS	·	1.2 km	MPC · JPL
199179	2005 YD_{226}	—	December 25, 2005	Mount Lemmon	Mount Lemmon Survey	·	1.7 km	MPC · JPL
199180	2005 YQ_{227}	—	December 25, 2005	Kitt Peak	Spacewatch	·	1.6 km	MPC · JPL
199181	2005 YA_{235}	—	December 28, 2005	Mount Lemmon	Mount Lemmon Survey	NYS	1.8 km	MPC · JPL
199182	2005 YD_{246}	—	December 30, 2005	Kitt Peak	Spacewatch	(5)	1.2 km	MPC · JPL
199183	2005 YU_{256}	—	December 30, 2005	Kitt Peak	Spacewatch	·	1.2 km	MPC · JPL
199184	2005 YS_{263}	—	December 25, 2005	Kitt Peak	Spacewatch	·	1.8 km	MPC · JPL
199185	2005 YU_{264}	—	December 25, 2005	Kitt Peak	Spacewatch	(5)	1.5 km	MPC · JPL
199186	2005 YF_{267}	—	December 24, 2005	Kitt Peak	Spacewatch	·	4.0 km	MPC · JPL
199187	2005 YP_{269}	—	December 25, 2005	Mount Lemmon	Mount Lemmon Survey	·	1.9 km	MPC · JPL
199188	2005 YY_{269}	—	December 26, 2005	Mount Lemmon	Mount Lemmon Survey	·	5.4 km	MPC · JPL
199189	2005 YL_{270}	—	December 27, 2005	Mount Lemmon	Mount Lemmon Survey	·	1.5 km	MPC · JPL
199190	2005 YF_{273}	—	December 30, 2005	Kitt Peak	Spacewatch	·	870 m	MPC · JPL
199191	2005 YQ_{282}	—	December 26, 2005	Mount Lemmon	Mount Lemmon Survey	·	1.5 km	MPC · JPL
199192	2005 YK_{290}	—	December 30, 2005	Mount Lemmon	Mount Lemmon Survey	·	4.0 km	MPC · JPL
199193	2006 AM	—	January 3, 2006	RAS	Lowe, A.	·	2.6 km	MPC · JPL
199194 Calcatreppola	2006 AO	Calcatreppola	January 3, 2006	Gnosca	S. Sposetti	·	990 m	MPC · JPL
199195	2006 AD_{1}	—	January 2, 2006	Mount Lemmon	Mount Lemmon Survey	·	1.7 km	MPC · JPL
199196	2006 AZ_{2}	—	January 4, 2006	Catalina	CSS	·	5.1 km	MPC · JPL
199197	2006 AX_{3}	—	January 5, 2006	Kitami	K. Endate	·	1.8 km	MPC · JPL
199198	2006 AC_{5}	—	January 2, 2006	Catalina	CSS	·	710 m	MPC · JPL
199199	2006 AP_{5}	—	January 2, 2006	Catalina	CSS	·	4.6 km	MPC · JPL
199200	2006 AE_{6}	—	January 2, 2006	Socorro	LINEAR	·	3.9 km	MPC · JPL

== 199201–199300 ==
back to top

Designation			Discovery			Properties		Ref
Permanent	Provisional	Named after	Date	Site	Discoverer(s)	Category	Diam.	Ref
199201	2006 AP_{10}	—	January 4, 2006	Catalina	CSS	·	1.1 km	MPC · JPL
199202	2006 AE_{11}	—	January 4, 2006	Mount Lemmon	Mount Lemmon Survey	·	1.4 km	MPC · JPL
199203	2006 AZ_{17}	—	January 5, 2006	Socorro	LINEAR	·	1.3 km	MPC · JPL
199204	2006 AT_{18}	—	January 5, 2006	Kitt Peak	Spacewatch	·	4.3 km	MPC · JPL
199205	2006 AB_{19}	—	January 5, 2006	Kitt Peak	Spacewatch	·	1.9 km	MPC · JPL
199206	2006 AN_{19}	—	January 4, 2006	Mount Lemmon	Mount Lemmon Survey	·	2.0 km	MPC · JPL
199207	2006 AB_{20}	—	January 5, 2006	Catalina	CSS	V	1.1 km	MPC · JPL
199208	2006 AX_{20}	—	January 5, 2006	Catalina	CSS	·	850 m	MPC · JPL
199209	2006 AR_{21}	—	January 5, 2006	Catalina	CSS	·	2.5 km	MPC · JPL
199210	2006 AS_{21}	—	January 5, 2006	Catalina	CSS	·	3.4 km	MPC · JPL
199211	2006 AW_{21}	—	January 5, 2006	Catalina	CSS	V	850 m	MPC · JPL
199212	2006 AH_{22}	—	January 5, 2006	Catalina	CSS	·	1.2 km	MPC · JPL
199213	2006 AK_{22}	—	January 5, 2006	Catalina	CSS	·	1.9 km	MPC · JPL
199214	2006 AY_{27}	—	January 5, 2006	Mount Lemmon	Mount Lemmon Survey	·	2.2 km	MPC · JPL
199215	2006 AF_{29}	—	January 6, 2006	Anderson Mesa	LONEOS	NYS	1.7 km	MPC · JPL
199216	2006 AJ_{29}	—	January 6, 2006	Mount Lemmon	Mount Lemmon Survey	·	3.6 km	MPC · JPL
199217	2006 AO_{30}	—	January 4, 2006	Catalina	CSS	·	3.7 km	MPC · JPL
199218	2006 AL_{32}	—	January 5, 2006	Anderson Mesa	LONEOS	·	2.1 km	MPC · JPL
199219	2006 AO_{37}	—	January 4, 2006	Kitt Peak	Spacewatch	·	1.3 km	MPC · JPL
199220	2006 AD_{41}	—	January 7, 2006	Kitt Peak	Spacewatch	·	3.1 km	MPC · JPL
199221	2006 AD_{42}	—	January 6, 2006	Kitt Peak	Spacewatch	·	1.1 km	MPC · JPL
199222	2006 AR_{42}	—	January 6, 2006	Kitt Peak	Spacewatch	·	1.2 km	MPC · JPL
199223	2006 AO_{43}	—	January 6, 2006	Mount Lemmon	Mount Lemmon Survey	·	3.9 km	MPC · JPL
199224	2006 AF_{45}	—	January 2, 2006	Catalina	CSS	·	3.0 km	MPC · JPL
199225	2006 AC_{47}	—	January 6, 2006	Catalina	CSS	·	1.9 km	MPC · JPL
199226	2006 AL_{48}	—	January 8, 2006	Mount Lemmon	Mount Lemmon Survey	BRA	2.8 km	MPC · JPL
199227	2006 AO_{49}	—	January 5, 2006	Kitt Peak	Spacewatch	·	950 m	MPC · JPL
199228	2006 AN_{52}	—	January 5, 2006	Anderson Mesa	LONEOS	·	1.1 km	MPC · JPL
199229	2006 AY_{58}	—	January 4, 2006	Mount Lemmon	Mount Lemmon Survey	·	2.3 km	MPC · JPL
199230	2006 AV_{65}	—	January 8, 2006	Kitt Peak	Spacewatch	·	1.1 km	MPC · JPL
199231	2006 AB_{66}	—	January 8, 2006	Mount Lemmon	Mount Lemmon Survey	·	2.4 km	MPC · JPL
199232	2006 AF_{68}	—	January 5, 2006	Mount Lemmon	Mount Lemmon Survey	MAS	960 m	MPC · JPL
199233	2006 AT_{68}	—	January 5, 2006	Mount Lemmon	Mount Lemmon Survey	·	1.4 km	MPC · JPL
199234	2006 AC_{70}	—	January 6, 2006	Kitt Peak	Spacewatch	·	820 m	MPC · JPL
199235	2006 AU_{72}	—	January 6, 2006	Kitt Peak	Spacewatch	RAF	1.4 km	MPC · JPL
199236	2006 AA_{73}	—	January 7, 2006	Mount Lemmon	Mount Lemmon Survey	·	2.0 km	MPC · JPL
199237	2006 AJ_{74}	—	January 5, 2006	Anderson Mesa	LONEOS	ERI	3.1 km	MPC · JPL
199238	2006 AM_{77}	—	January 6, 2006	Kitt Peak	Spacewatch	·	3.4 km	MPC · JPL
199239	2006 AQ_{77}	—	January 6, 2006	Mount Lemmon	Mount Lemmon Survey	·	970 m	MPC · JPL
199240	2006 AW_{84}	—	January 6, 2006	Anderson Mesa	LONEOS	·	1.6 km	MPC · JPL
199241	2006 AC_{85}	—	January 6, 2006	Socorro	LINEAR	·	2.5 km	MPC · JPL
199242	2006 AK_{86}	—	January 6, 2006	Catalina	CSS	PHO	3.7 km	MPC · JPL
199243	2006 AO_{90}	—	January 6, 2006	Kitt Peak	Spacewatch	MAS	1.0 km	MPC · JPL
199244	2006 AK_{91}	—	January 7, 2006	Kitt Peak	Spacewatch	·	1.4 km	MPC · JPL
199245	2006 AR_{92}	—	January 7, 2006	Mount Lemmon	Mount Lemmon Survey	·	1.5 km	MPC · JPL
199246	2006 AJ_{97}	—	January 5, 2006	Catalina	CSS	·	4.1 km	MPC · JPL
199247	2006 AE_{98}	—	January 5, 2006	Mount Lemmon	Mount Lemmon Survey	THM	3.5 km	MPC · JPL
199248	2006 AM_{100}	—	January 8, 2006	Mount Lemmon	Mount Lemmon Survey	PAD	4.4 km	MPC · JPL
199249	2006 AZ_{101}	—	January 5, 2006	Mount Lemmon	Mount Lemmon Survey	·	6.0 km	MPC · JPL
199250	2006 AE_{102}	—	January 8, 2006	Mount Lemmon	Mount Lemmon Survey	NYS	1.3 km	MPC · JPL
199251	2006 BZ	—	January 18, 2006	Palomar	NEAT	PHO	2.0 km	MPC · JPL
199252	2006 BF_{2}	—	January 20, 2006	Kitt Peak	Spacewatch	V	800 m	MPC · JPL
199253	2006 BN_{2}	—	January 20, 2006	Kitt Peak	Spacewatch	·	2.8 km	MPC · JPL
199254	2006 BU_{2}	—	January 20, 2006	Catalina	CSS	·	4.1 km	MPC · JPL
199255	2006 BB_{4}	—	January 21, 2006	Kitt Peak	Spacewatch	THM	2.7 km	MPC · JPL
199256	2006 BQ_{5}	—	January 21, 2006	Mount Lemmon	Mount Lemmon Survey	KOR	2.0 km	MPC · JPL
199257	2006 BW_{9}	—	January 20, 2006	Kitt Peak	Spacewatch	·	2.3 km	MPC · JPL
199258	2006 BN_{11}	—	January 20, 2006	Kitt Peak	Spacewatch	·	3.0 km	MPC · JPL
199259	2006 BF_{12}	—	January 21, 2006	Mount Lemmon	Mount Lemmon Survey	·	1.4 km	MPC · JPL
199260	2006 BJ_{12}	—	January 21, 2006	Anderson Mesa	LONEOS	·	1.0 km	MPC · JPL
199261 Cassandralejoly	2006 BN_{12}	Cassandralejoly	January 21, 2006	Kitt Peak	Spacewatch	·	3.0 km	MPC · JPL
199262	2006 BB_{13}	—	January 21, 2006	Mount Lemmon	Mount Lemmon Survey	·	2.0 km	MPC · JPL
199263	2006 BB_{14}	—	January 22, 2006	Mount Lemmon	Mount Lemmon Survey	·	1.6 km	MPC · JPL
199264	2006 BC_{14}	—	January 22, 2006	Mount Lemmon	Mount Lemmon Survey	·	1.5 km	MPC · JPL
199265	2006 BT_{15}	—	January 22, 2006	Mount Lemmon	Mount Lemmon Survey	·	2.1 km	MPC · JPL
199266	2006 BC_{20}	—	January 22, 2006	Anderson Mesa	LONEOS	·	5.1 km	MPC · JPL
199267	2006 BW_{20}	—	January 22, 2006	Mount Lemmon	Mount Lemmon Survey	MAS	990 m	MPC · JPL
199268	2006 BB_{22}	—	January 22, 2006	Mount Lemmon	Mount Lemmon Survey	fast	2.1 km	MPC · JPL
199269	2006 BZ_{22}	—	January 22, 2006	Mount Lemmon	Mount Lemmon Survey	EOS	3.2 km	MPC · JPL
199270	2006 BC_{29}	—	January 23, 2006	Socorro	LINEAR	GEF	1.7 km	MPC · JPL
199271	2006 BU_{30}	—	January 20, 2006	Kitt Peak	Spacewatch	·	3.1 km	MPC · JPL
199272	2006 BS_{31}	—	January 20, 2006	Kitt Peak	Spacewatch	·	2.0 km	MPC · JPL
199273	2006 BV_{31}	—	January 20, 2006	Kitt Peak	Spacewatch	NYS	1.5 km	MPC · JPL
199274	2006 BW_{31}	—	January 20, 2006	Kitt Peak	Spacewatch	MAS	1.2 km	MPC · JPL
199275	2006 BU_{32}	—	January 21, 2006	Kitt Peak	Spacewatch	·	2.8 km	MPC · JPL
199276	2006 BY_{33}	—	January 21, 2006	Kitt Peak	Spacewatch	·	2.5 km	MPC · JPL
199277	2006 BA_{34}	—	January 21, 2006	Kitt Peak	Spacewatch	·	3.4 km	MPC · JPL
199278	2006 BV_{37}	—	January 23, 2006	Mount Lemmon	Mount Lemmon Survey	·	2.3 km	MPC · JPL
199279	2006 BN_{40}	—	January 21, 2006	Kitt Peak	Spacewatch	PAD	3.4 km	MPC · JPL
199280	2006 BE_{44}	—	January 23, 2006	Catalina	CSS	EOS	3.8 km	MPC · JPL
199281	2006 BU_{44}	—	January 23, 2006	Mount Lemmon	Mount Lemmon Survey	·	3.3 km	MPC · JPL
199282	2006 BS_{45}	—	January 23, 2006	Mount Lemmon	Mount Lemmon Survey	·	2.8 km	MPC · JPL
199283	2006 BW_{46}	—	January 23, 2006	Mount Lemmon	Mount Lemmon Survey	·	1.9 km	MPC · JPL
199284	2006 BB_{47}	—	January 24, 2006	Socorro	LINEAR	·	1.7 km	MPC · JPL
199285	2006 BP_{53}	—	January 25, 2006	Kitt Peak	Spacewatch	·	1.2 km	MPC · JPL
199286	2006 BC_{54}	—	January 25, 2006	Kitt Peak	Spacewatch	NYS	1.6 km	MPC · JPL
199287	2006 BX_{54}	—	January 25, 2006	Nyukasa	Japan Aerospace Exploration Agency	·	2.7 km	MPC · JPL
199288	2006 BX_{56}	—	January 22, 2006	Mount Lemmon	Mount Lemmon Survey	·	890 m	MPC · JPL
199289	2006 BO_{57}	—	January 23, 2006	Kitt Peak	Spacewatch	·	3.9 km	MPC · JPL
199290	2006 BQ_{58}	—	January 23, 2006	Socorro	LINEAR	MRX	1.7 km	MPC · JPL
199291	2006 BB_{60}	—	January 25, 2006	Kitt Peak	Spacewatch	·	2.5 km	MPC · JPL
199292	2006 BD_{63}	—	January 21, 2006	Palomar	NEAT	·	2.0 km	MPC · JPL
199293	2006 BC_{66}	—	January 23, 2006	Kitt Peak	Spacewatch	·	2.0 km	MPC · JPL
199294	2006 BN_{68}	—	January 23, 2006	Kitt Peak	Spacewatch	MAS	1.2 km	MPC · JPL
199295	2006 BQ_{68}	—	January 23, 2006	Kitt Peak	Spacewatch	·	2.0 km	MPC · JPL
199296	2006 BA_{76}	—	January 23, 2006	Kitt Peak	Spacewatch	·	2.2 km	MPC · JPL
199297	2006 BB_{79}	—	January 23, 2006	Kitt Peak	Spacewatch	·	970 m	MPC · JPL
199298	2006 BL_{79}	—	January 23, 2006	Kitt Peak	Spacewatch	·	3.8 km	MPC · JPL
199299	2006 BV_{79}	—	January 23, 2006	Kitt Peak	Spacewatch	·	2.0 km	MPC · JPL
199300	2006 BB_{80}	—	January 23, 2006	Kitt Peak	Spacewatch	·	4.2 km	MPC · JPL

== 199301–199400 ==
back to top

Designation			Discovery			Properties		Ref
Permanent	Provisional	Named after	Date	Site	Discoverer(s)	Category	Diam.	Ref
199301	2006 BC_{82}	—	January 23, 2006	Kitt Peak	Spacewatch	·	1.4 km	MPC · JPL
199302	2006 BD_{82}	—	January 23, 2006	Kitt Peak	Spacewatch	·	4.3 km	MPC · JPL
199303	2006 BM_{83}	—	January 25, 2006	Kitt Peak	Spacewatch	·	1.1 km	MPC · JPL
199304	2006 BV_{83}	—	January 25, 2006	Kitt Peak	Spacewatch	·	1.8 km	MPC · JPL
199305	2006 BR_{86}	—	January 25, 2006	Kitt Peak	Spacewatch	MAS	1.0 km	MPC · JPL
199306	2006 BL_{91}	—	January 26, 2006	Kitt Peak	Spacewatch	·	1.8 km	MPC · JPL
199307	2006 BR_{93}	—	January 26, 2006	Kitt Peak	Spacewatch	·	3.1 km	MPC · JPL
199308	2006 BS_{93}	—	January 26, 2006	Kitt Peak	Spacewatch	MAS	660 m	MPC · JPL
199309	2006 BF_{98}	—	January 27, 2006	Socorro	LINEAR	·	1.5 km	MPC · JPL
199310	2006 BB_{99}	—	January 27, 2006	Catalina	CSS	GEF	2.2 km	MPC · JPL
199311	2006 BJ_{99}	—	January 22, 2006	Mount Lemmon	Mount Lemmon Survey	·	1.4 km	MPC · JPL
199312	2006 BN_{101}	—	January 23, 2006	Mount Lemmon	Mount Lemmon Survey	·	1.0 km	MPC · JPL
199313	2006 BZ_{101}	—	January 23, 2006	Mount Lemmon	Mount Lemmon Survey	·	3.7 km	MPC · JPL
199314	2006 BG_{102}	—	January 23, 2006	Mount Lemmon	Mount Lemmon Survey	KOR	1.6 km	MPC · JPL
199315	2006 BN_{103}	—	January 23, 2006	Mount Lemmon	Mount Lemmon Survey	EMA	3.4 km	MPC · JPL
199316	2006 BR_{103}	—	January 23, 2006	Mount Lemmon	Mount Lemmon Survey	·	1.6 km	MPC · JPL
199317	2006 BQ_{107}	—	January 25, 2006	Kitt Peak	Spacewatch	·	2.4 km	MPC · JPL
199318	2006 BA_{113}	—	January 25, 2006	Kitt Peak	Spacewatch	·	1.9 km	MPC · JPL
199319	2006 BJ_{114}	—	January 25, 2006	Kitt Peak	Spacewatch	·	3.0 km	MPC · JPL
199320	2006 BB_{117}	—	January 26, 2006	Kitt Peak	Spacewatch	·	800 m	MPC · JPL
199321	2006 BN_{117}	—	January 26, 2006	Mount Lemmon	Mount Lemmon Survey	·	1.3 km	MPC · JPL
199322	2006 BC_{118}	—	January 26, 2006	Kitt Peak	Spacewatch	·	3.7 km	MPC · JPL
199323	2006 BB_{120}	—	January 26, 2006	Kitt Peak	Spacewatch	·	3.2 km	MPC · JPL
199324	2006 BD_{122}	—	January 26, 2006	Kitt Peak	Spacewatch	·	5.0 km	MPC · JPL
199325	2006 BJ_{122}	—	January 26, 2006	Kitt Peak	Spacewatch	·	1.4 km	MPC · JPL
199326	2006 BR_{122}	—	January 26, 2006	Kitt Peak	Spacewatch	KOR	2.2 km	MPC · JPL
199327	2006 BR_{128}	—	January 26, 2006	Mount Lemmon	Mount Lemmon Survey	·	2.5 km	MPC · JPL
199328	2006 BC_{131}	—	January 26, 2006	Kitt Peak	Spacewatch	·	2.0 km	MPC · JPL
199329	2006 BH_{131}	—	January 26, 2006	Kitt Peak	Spacewatch	·	4.2 km	MPC · JPL
199330	2006 BS_{131}	—	January 26, 2006	Kitt Peak	Spacewatch	(12739)	2.5 km	MPC · JPL
199331	2006 BT_{131}	—	January 26, 2006	Kitt Peak	Spacewatch	·	2.2 km	MPC · JPL
199332	2006 BU_{131}	—	January 26, 2006	Kitt Peak	Spacewatch	·	2.6 km	MPC · JPL
199333	2006 BZ_{131}	—	January 26, 2006	Kitt Peak	Spacewatch	·	2.9 km	MPC · JPL
199334	2006 BS_{133}	—	January 26, 2006	Mount Lemmon	Mount Lemmon Survey	·	1.7 km	MPC · JPL
199335	2006 BX_{133}	—	January 26, 2006	Mount Lemmon	Mount Lemmon Survey	·	2.4 km	MPC · JPL
199336	2006 BU_{138}	—	January 28, 2006	Mount Lemmon	Mount Lemmon Survey	AGN	1.6 km	MPC · JPL
199337	2006 BE_{147}	—	January 31, 2006	7300 Observatory	W. K. Y. Yeung	WIT	1.5 km	MPC · JPL
199338	2006 BM_{148}	—	January 22, 2006	Catalina	CSS	·	1.0 km	MPC · JPL
199339	2006 BS_{150}	—	January 25, 2006	Kitt Peak	Spacewatch	·	1.0 km	MPC · JPL
199340	2006 BA_{155}	—	January 25, 2006	Kitt Peak	Spacewatch	·	1.6 km	MPC · JPL
199341	2006 BM_{157}	—	January 25, 2006	Kitt Peak	Spacewatch	·	2.2 km	MPC · JPL
199342	2006 BW_{157}	—	January 25, 2006	Kitt Peak	Spacewatch	·	1.6 km	MPC · JPL
199343	2006 BY_{157}	—	January 25, 2006	Kitt Peak	Spacewatch	·	2.0 km	MPC · JPL
199344	2006 BL_{158}	—	January 25, 2006	Kitt Peak	Spacewatch	·	1.9 km	MPC · JPL
199345	2006 BS_{158}	—	January 26, 2006	Mount Lemmon	Mount Lemmon Survey	·	1.5 km	MPC · JPL
199346	2006 BP_{161}	—	January 26, 2006	Anderson Mesa	LONEOS	fast	3.5 km	MPC · JPL
199347	2006 BA_{162}	—	January 26, 2006	Catalina	CSS	·	1.1 km	MPC · JPL
199348	2006 BW_{162}	—	January 26, 2006	Mount Lemmon	Mount Lemmon Survey	·	3.0 km	MPC · JPL
199349	2006 BB_{163}	—	January 26, 2006	Mount Lemmon	Mount Lemmon Survey	·	4.0 km	MPC · JPL
199350	2006 BJ_{163}	—	January 26, 2006	Mount Lemmon	Mount Lemmon Survey	·	3.0 km	MPC · JPL
199351	2006 BT_{165}	—	January 26, 2006	Mount Lemmon	Mount Lemmon Survey	·	2.9 km	MPC · JPL
199352	2006 BD_{167}	—	January 26, 2006	Mount Lemmon	Mount Lemmon Survey	·	2.4 km	MPC · JPL
199353	2006 BP_{168}	—	January 26, 2006	Mount Lemmon	Mount Lemmon Survey	KOR	1.9 km	MPC · JPL
199354	2006 BR_{179}	—	January 27, 2006	Mount Lemmon	Mount Lemmon Survey	·	1.9 km	MPC · JPL
199355	2006 BD_{180}	—	January 27, 2006	Mount Lemmon	Mount Lemmon Survey	NYS	940 m	MPC · JPL
199356	2006 BW_{182}	—	January 27, 2006	Mount Lemmon	Mount Lemmon Survey	·	2.0 km	MPC · JPL
199357	2006 BY_{182}	—	January 27, 2006	Mount Lemmon	Mount Lemmon Survey	·	5.4 km	MPC · JPL
199358	2006 BZ_{182}	—	January 27, 2006	Mount Lemmon	Mount Lemmon Survey	·	2.7 km	MPC · JPL
199359	2006 BG_{183}	—	January 27, 2006	Mount Lemmon	Mount Lemmon Survey	·	3.6 km	MPC · JPL
199360	2006 BP_{186}	—	January 28, 2006	Mount Lemmon	Mount Lemmon Survey	·	1.9 km	MPC · JPL
199361	2006 BV_{186}	—	January 28, 2006	Mount Lemmon	Mount Lemmon Survey	RAF	1.3 km	MPC · JPL
199362	2006 BR_{188}	—	January 28, 2006	Kitt Peak	Spacewatch	ADE	2.2 km	MPC · JPL
199363	2006 BQ_{189}	—	January 28, 2006	Kitt Peak	Spacewatch	·	2.4 km	MPC · JPL
199364	2006 BY_{190}	—	January 28, 2006	Kitt Peak	Spacewatch	·	3.5 km	MPC · JPL
199365	2006 BN_{192}	—	January 30, 2006	Kitt Peak	Spacewatch	·	1.4 km	MPC · JPL
199366	2006 BP_{195}	—	January 30, 2006	Kitt Peak	Spacewatch	·	2.4 km	MPC · JPL
199367	2006 BZ_{198}	—	January 30, 2006	Kitt Peak	Spacewatch	·	3.1 km	MPC · JPL
199368	2006 BE_{201}	—	January 31, 2006	Mount Lemmon	Mount Lemmon Survey	·	2.2 km	MPC · JPL
199369	2006 BY_{201}	—	January 31, 2006	Kitt Peak	Spacewatch	·	2.9 km	MPC · JPL
199370	2006 BA_{203}	—	January 31, 2006	Kitt Peak	Spacewatch	·	2.6 km	MPC · JPL
199371	2006 BA_{211}	—	January 31, 2006	Catalina	CSS	EUN	2.2 km	MPC · JPL
199372	2006 BZ_{211}	—	January 31, 2006	Kitt Peak	Spacewatch	EOS	3.2 km	MPC · JPL
199373	2006 BT_{216}	—	January 26, 2006	Anderson Mesa	LONEOS	·	2.6 km	MPC · JPL
199374	2006 BW_{218}	—	January 28, 2006	Mount Lemmon	Mount Lemmon Survey	·	1.4 km	MPC · JPL
199375	2006 BB_{219}	—	January 28, 2006	Mount Lemmon	Mount Lemmon Survey	·	3.0 km	MPC · JPL
199376	2006 BO_{222}	—	January 30, 2006	Kitt Peak	Spacewatch	NYS	2.7 km	MPC · JPL
199377	2006 BW_{223}	—	January 30, 2006	Kitt Peak	Spacewatch	·	1.7 km	MPC · JPL
199378	2006 BA_{224}	—	January 30, 2006	Kitt Peak	Spacewatch	(5)	1.6 km	MPC · JPL
199379	2006 BX_{226}	—	January 30, 2006	Kitt Peak	Spacewatch	·	1.6 km	MPC · JPL
199380	2006 BK_{227}	—	January 30, 2006	Kitt Peak	Spacewatch	·	2.9 km	MPC · JPL
199381	2006 BP_{227}	—	January 30, 2006	Kitt Peak	Spacewatch	·	2.7 km	MPC · JPL
199382	2006 BH_{240}	—	January 31, 2006	Kitt Peak	Spacewatch	·	2.5 km	MPC · JPL
199383	2006 BY_{247}	—	January 31, 2006	Kitt Peak	Spacewatch	THM	2.7 km	MPC · JPL
199384	2006 BC_{248}	—	January 31, 2006	Kitt Peak	Spacewatch	·	1.6 km	MPC · JPL
199385	2006 BT_{248}	—	January 31, 2006	Kitt Peak	Spacewatch	·	2.9 km	MPC · JPL
199386	2006 BV_{249}	—	January 31, 2006	Mount Lemmon	Mount Lemmon Survey	V	740 m	MPC · JPL
199387	2006 BP_{251}	—	January 31, 2006	Kitt Peak	Spacewatch	·	1.4 km	MPC · JPL
199388	2006 BA_{252}	—	January 31, 2006	Kitt Peak	Spacewatch	·	2.7 km	MPC · JPL
199389	2006 BH_{254}	—	January 31, 2006	Kitt Peak	Spacewatch	·	630 m	MPC · JPL
199390	2006 BD_{255}	—	January 31, 2006	Kitt Peak	Spacewatch	·	1.3 km	MPC · JPL
199391	2006 BN_{255}	—	January 31, 2006	Kitt Peak	Spacewatch	·	2.7 km	MPC · JPL
199392	2006 BB_{257}	—	January 31, 2006	Kitt Peak	Spacewatch	(5)	2.3 km	MPC · JPL
199393	2006 BJ_{264}	—	January 31, 2006	Kitt Peak	Spacewatch	KOR	1.8 km	MPC · JPL
199394	2006 BU_{264}	—	January 31, 2006	Kitt Peak	Spacewatch	AGN	1.5 km	MPC · JPL
199395	2006 BE_{265}	—	January 31, 2006	Kitt Peak	Spacewatch	·	4.0 km	MPC · JPL
199396	2006 BA_{266}	—	January 31, 2006	Kitt Peak	Spacewatch	VER	4.0 km	MPC · JPL
199397	2006 BD_{266}	—	January 31, 2006	Kitt Peak	Spacewatch	·	2.6 km	MPC · JPL
199398	2006 BO_{266}	—	January 31, 2006	Kitt Peak	Spacewatch	·	3.3 km	MPC · JPL
199399	2006 BT_{268}	—	January 27, 2006	Catalina	CSS	·	2.2 km	MPC · JPL
199400	2006 BZ_{273}	—	January 26, 2006	Kitt Peak	Spacewatch	MAS	1.0 km	MPC · JPL

== 199401–199500 ==
back to top

Designation			Discovery			Properties		Ref
Permanent	Provisional	Named after	Date	Site	Discoverer(s)	Category	Diam.	Ref
199401	2006 BG_{274}	—	January 23, 2006	Mount Lemmon	Mount Lemmon Survey	·	1.4 km	MPC · JPL
199402	2006 BW_{274}	—	January 23, 2006	Mount Lemmon	Mount Lemmon Survey	·	4.1 km	MPC · JPL
199403	2006 CM_{9}	—	February 1, 2006	Catalina	CSS	EUN	2.4 km	MPC · JPL
199404	2006 CG_{14}	—	February 1, 2006	Kitt Peak	Spacewatch	·	1.2 km	MPC · JPL
199405	2006 CV_{17}	—	February 1, 2006	Kitt Peak	Spacewatch	KOR	2.2 km	MPC · JPL
199406	2006 CF_{19}	—	February 1, 2006	Mount Lemmon	Mount Lemmon Survey	·	1.3 km	MPC · JPL
199407	2006 CF_{21}	—	February 1, 2006	Catalina	CSS	PHO	2.0 km	MPC · JPL
199408	2006 CC_{27}	—	February 2, 2006	Kitt Peak	Spacewatch	·	2.7 km	MPC · JPL
199409	2006 CW_{29}	—	February 2, 2006	Kitt Peak	Spacewatch	V	1.3 km	MPC · JPL
199410	2006 CY_{34}	—	February 2, 2006	Mount Lemmon	Mount Lemmon Survey	·	1.5 km	MPC · JPL
199411	2006 CZ_{38}	—	February 2, 2006	Kitt Peak	Spacewatch	·	1.9 km	MPC · JPL
199412	2006 CR_{41}	—	February 2, 2006	Kitt Peak	Spacewatch	·	1.6 km	MPC · JPL
199413	2006 CV_{42}	—	February 2, 2006	Kitt Peak	Spacewatch	·	3.0 km	MPC · JPL
199414	2006 CV_{43}	—	February 2, 2006	Mount Lemmon	Mount Lemmon Survey	·	2.2 km	MPC · JPL
199415	2006 CY_{43}	—	February 2, 2006	Kitt Peak	Spacewatch	GEF	2.2 km	MPC · JPL
199416	2006 CJ_{53}	—	February 4, 2006	Kitt Peak	Spacewatch	KOR	2.0 km	MPC · JPL
199417	2006 CJ_{57}	—	February 4, 2006	Mount Lemmon	Mount Lemmon Survey	KOR	1.8 km	MPC · JPL
199418	2006 CU_{57}	—	February 4, 2006	Mount Lemmon	Mount Lemmon Survey	NEM	3.9 km	MPC · JPL
199419	2006 DG	—	February 21, 2006	RAS	Lowe, A.	·	1.8 km	MPC · JPL
199420	2006 DQ_{1}	—	February 20, 2006	Kitt Peak	Spacewatch	·	1.0 km	MPC · JPL
199421	2006 DX_{1}	—	February 20, 2006	Kitt Peak	Spacewatch	MAS	810 m	MPC · JPL
199422	2006 DZ_{1}	—	February 20, 2006	Kitt Peak	Spacewatch	·	2.6 km	MPC · JPL
199423	2006 DR_{6}	—	February 20, 2006	Mount Lemmon	Mount Lemmon Survey	AGN	1.9 km	MPC · JPL
199424	2006 DA_{7}	—	February 20, 2006	Catalina	CSS	·	4.0 km	MPC · JPL
199425	2006 DD_{8}	—	February 20, 2006	Kitt Peak	Spacewatch	HYG	5.1 km	MPC · JPL
199426	2006 DE_{8}	—	February 20, 2006	Kitt Peak	Spacewatch	·	2.6 km	MPC · JPL
199427	2006 DC_{12}	—	February 20, 2006	Catalina	CSS	·	2.7 km	MPC · JPL
199428	2006 DS_{12}	—	February 21, 2006	Catalina	CSS	·	2.5 km	MPC · JPL
199429	2006 DJ_{13}	—	February 22, 2006	Catalina	CSS	·	3.0 km	MPC · JPL
199430	2006 DP_{19}	—	February 20, 2006	Kitt Peak	Spacewatch	EMA	4.2 km	MPC · JPL
199431	2006 DD_{20}	—	February 20, 2006	Kitt Peak	Spacewatch	NYS	1.4 km	MPC · JPL
199432	2006 DH_{22}	—	February 20, 2006	Kitt Peak	Spacewatch	THM	3.6 km	MPC · JPL
199433	2006 DY_{22}	—	February 20, 2006	Kitt Peak	Spacewatch	MRX	1.6 km	MPC · JPL
199434	2006 DJ_{23}	—	February 20, 2006	Kitt Peak	Spacewatch	·	1.8 km	MPC · JPL
199435	2006 DT_{24}	—	February 20, 2006	Kitt Peak	Spacewatch	·	2.6 km	MPC · JPL
199436	2006 DV_{25}	—	February 20, 2006	Kitt Peak	Spacewatch	·	2.1 km	MPC · JPL
199437	2006 DN_{26}	—	February 20, 2006	Mount Lemmon	Mount Lemmon Survey	·	1.9 km	MPC · JPL
199438	2006 DR_{30}	—	February 20, 2006	Kitt Peak	Spacewatch	·	2.3 km	MPC · JPL
199439	2006 DN_{31}	—	February 20, 2006	Mount Lemmon	Mount Lemmon Survey	·	2.0 km	MPC · JPL
199440	2006 DU_{31}	—	February 20, 2006	Mount Lemmon	Mount Lemmon Survey	·	3.6 km	MPC · JPL
199441	2006 DY_{31}	—	February 20, 2006	Mount Lemmon	Mount Lemmon Survey	·	3.3 km	MPC · JPL
199442	2006 DL_{33}	—	February 20, 2006	Kitt Peak	Spacewatch	·	2.1 km	MPC · JPL
199443	2006 DN_{33}	—	February 20, 2006	Kitt Peak	Spacewatch	·	2.5 km	MPC · JPL
199444	2006 DM_{34}	—	February 20, 2006	Kitt Peak	Spacewatch	·	6.2 km	MPC · JPL
199445	2006 DU_{34}	—	February 20, 2006	Mount Lemmon	Mount Lemmon Survey	KOR	1.8 km	MPC · JPL
199446	2006 DM_{35}	—	February 20, 2006	Mount Lemmon	Mount Lemmon Survey	AGN	1.6 km	MPC · JPL
199447	2006 DG_{36}	—	February 20, 2006	Mount Lemmon	Mount Lemmon Survey	·	2.5 km	MPC · JPL
199448	2006 DQ_{37}	—	February 20, 2006	Mount Lemmon	Mount Lemmon Survey	·	4.1 km	MPC · JPL
199449	2006 DD_{38}	—	February 21, 2006	Anderson Mesa	LONEOS	·	2.7 km	MPC · JPL
199450	2006 DF_{38}	—	February 21, 2006	Anderson Mesa	LONEOS	AGN	1.6 km	MPC · JPL
199451	2006 DH_{38}	—	February 21, 2006	Anderson Mesa	LONEOS	MAS	860 m	MPC · JPL
199452	2006 DK_{38}	—	February 21, 2006	Anderson Mesa	LONEOS	·	3.3 km	MPC · JPL
199453	2006 DL_{39}	—	February 21, 2006	Mount Lemmon	Mount Lemmon Survey	KOR	2.1 km	MPC · JPL
199454	2006 DQ_{39}	—	February 22, 2006	Catalina	CSS	EUN	1.9 km	MPC · JPL
199455	2006 DY_{40}	—	February 22, 2006	Catalina	CSS	·	5.8 km	MPC · JPL
199456	2006 DF_{41}	—	February 23, 2006	Kitt Peak	Spacewatch	·	2.6 km	MPC · JPL
199457	2006 DN_{41}	—	February 23, 2006	Anderson Mesa	LONEOS	·	3.7 km	MPC · JPL
199458	2006 DJ_{45}	—	February 20, 2006	Mount Lemmon	Mount Lemmon Survey	·	2.4 km	MPC · JPL
199459	2006 DT_{46}	—	February 20, 2006	Mount Lemmon	Mount Lemmon Survey	·	2.5 km	MPC · JPL
199460	2006 DB_{47}	—	February 20, 2006	Mount Lemmon	Mount Lemmon Survey	·	2.7 km	MPC · JPL
199461	2006 DP_{52}	—	February 24, 2006	Palomar	NEAT	·	2.2 km	MPC · JPL
199462	2006 DZ_{52}	—	February 24, 2006	Kitt Peak	Spacewatch	·	2.0 km	MPC · JPL
199463	2006 DX_{57}	—	February 24, 2006	Mount Lemmon	Mount Lemmon Survey	·	2.9 km	MPC · JPL
199464	2006 DY_{57}	—	February 24, 2006	Mount Lemmon	Mount Lemmon Survey	·	1.3 km	MPC · JPL
199465	2006 DX_{58}	—	February 24, 2006	Kitt Peak	Spacewatch	KOR	2.3 km	MPC · JPL
199466	2006 DC_{59}	—	February 24, 2006	Mount Lemmon	Mount Lemmon Survey	KOR	2.1 km	MPC · JPL
199467	2006 DW_{59}	—	February 24, 2006	Mount Lemmon	Mount Lemmon Survey	·	3.0 km	MPC · JPL
199468	2006 DF_{60}	—	February 24, 2006	Kitt Peak	Spacewatch	·	2.9 km	MPC · JPL
199469	2006 DR_{60}	—	February 24, 2006	Kitt Peak	Spacewatch	·	1.1 km	MPC · JPL
199470	2006 DL_{62}	—	February 25, 2006	Socorro	LINEAR	·	940 m	MPC · JPL
199471	2006 DR_{64}	—	February 20, 2006	Catalina	CSS	·	3.3 km	MPC · JPL
199472	2006 DT_{64}	—	February 20, 2006	Catalina	CSS	HOF	4.3 km	MPC · JPL
199473	2006 DW_{64}	—	February 20, 2006	Catalina	CSS	·	3.9 km	MPC · JPL
199474	2006 DD_{66}	—	February 21, 2006	Catalina	CSS	·	4.2 km	MPC · JPL
199475	2006 DQ_{66}	—	February 22, 2006	Catalina	CSS	·	2.6 km	MPC · JPL
199476	2006 DS_{66}	—	February 22, 2006	Socorro	LINEAR	NYS	1.5 km	MPC · JPL
199477	2006 DV_{66}	—	February 22, 2006	Anderson Mesa	LONEOS	·	3.7 km	MPC · JPL
199478	2006 DE_{73}	—	February 22, 2006	Anderson Mesa	LONEOS	NYS ·	3.2 km	MPC · JPL
199479	2006 DM_{73}	—	February 22, 2006	Mount Lemmon	Mount Lemmon Survey	MAR	1.9 km	MPC · JPL
199480	2006 DY_{73}	—	February 23, 2006	Kitt Peak	Spacewatch	(5)	1.5 km	MPC · JPL
199481	2006 DO_{74}	—	February 24, 2006	Kitt Peak	Spacewatch	AGN	1.5 km	MPC · JPL
199482	2006 DE_{76}	—	February 24, 2006	Kitt Peak	Spacewatch	·	1.5 km	MPC · JPL
199483	2006 DY_{76}	—	February 24, 2006	Kitt Peak	Spacewatch	·	6.1 km	MPC · JPL
199484	2006 DA_{77}	—	February 24, 2006	Kitt Peak	Spacewatch	·	1.9 km	MPC · JPL
199485	2006 DH_{79}	—	February 24, 2006	Kitt Peak	Spacewatch	KOR	1.8 km	MPC · JPL
199486	2006 DP_{79}	—	February 24, 2006	Kitt Peak	Spacewatch	·	1.8 km	MPC · JPL
199487	2006 DY_{81}	—	February 24, 2006	Kitt Peak	Spacewatch	·	4.1 km	MPC · JPL
199488	2006 DB_{83}	—	February 24, 2006	Kitt Peak	Spacewatch	·	2.3 km	MPC · JPL
199489	2006 DO_{83}	—	February 24, 2006	Kitt Peak	Spacewatch	NYS	1.2 km	MPC · JPL
199490	2006 DT_{84}	—	February 24, 2006	Kitt Peak	Spacewatch	AGN	1.6 km	MPC · JPL
199491	2006 DD_{85}	—	February 24, 2006	Kitt Peak	Spacewatch	HOF	4.2 km	MPC · JPL
199492	2006 DX_{87}	—	February 24, 2006	Kitt Peak	Spacewatch	·	3.2 km	MPC · JPL
199493	2006 DG_{89}	—	February 24, 2006	Kitt Peak	Spacewatch	·	2.4 km	MPC · JPL
199494	2006 DR_{91}	—	February 24, 2006	Kitt Peak	Spacewatch	KOR	1.8 km	MPC · JPL
199495	2006 DS_{92}	—	February 24, 2006	Kitt Peak	Spacewatch	THM	3.3 km	MPC · JPL
199496	2006 DA_{94}	—	February 24, 2006	Kitt Peak	Spacewatch	KOR	2.2 km	MPC · JPL
199497	2006 DE_{94}	—	February 24, 2006	Kitt Peak	Spacewatch	·	2.0 km	MPC · JPL
199498	2006 DX_{95}	—	February 24, 2006	Kitt Peak	Spacewatch	·	3.0 km	MPC · JPL
199499	2006 DN_{96}	—	February 24, 2006	Kitt Peak	Spacewatch	EOS	2.7 km	MPC · JPL
199500	2006 DD_{103}	—	February 25, 2006	Mount Lemmon	Mount Lemmon Survey	·	2.5 km	MPC · JPL

== 199501–199600 ==
back to top

Designation			Discovery			Properties		Ref
Permanent	Provisional	Named after	Date	Site	Discoverer(s)	Category	Diam.	Ref
199501	2006 DG_{104}	—	February 25, 2006	Kitt Peak	Spacewatch	·	1.8 km	MPC · JPL
199502	2006 DH_{110}	—	February 25, 2006	Socorro	LINEAR	·	4.8 km	MPC · JPL
199503	2006 DZ_{110}	—	February 25, 2006	Kitt Peak	Spacewatch	·	2.2 km	MPC · JPL
199504	2006 DT_{112}	—	February 27, 2006	Mount Lemmon	Mount Lemmon Survey	·	1.2 km	MPC · JPL
199505	2006 DT_{115}	—	February 27, 2006	Kitt Peak	Spacewatch	·	2.0 km	MPC · JPL
199506	2006 DF_{117}	—	February 27, 2006	Kitt Peak	Spacewatch	·	2.6 km	MPC · JPL
199507	2006 DQ_{118}	—	February 28, 2006	Mount Lemmon	Mount Lemmon Survey	·	2.7 km	MPC · JPL
199508	2006 DJ_{122}	—	February 23, 2006	Anderson Mesa	LONEOS	·	3.4 km	MPC · JPL
199509	2006 DV_{122}	—	February 24, 2006	Catalina	CSS	BRA	3.2 km	MPC · JPL
199510	2006 DW_{122}	—	February 24, 2006	Anderson Mesa	LONEOS	·	3.5 km	MPC · JPL
199511	2006 DH_{124}	—	February 24, 2006	Mount Lemmon	Mount Lemmon Survey	KOR	1.9 km	MPC · JPL
199512	2006 DR_{124}	—	February 24, 2006	Kitt Peak	Spacewatch	KOR	1.4 km	MPC · JPL
199513	2006 DU_{127}	—	February 25, 2006	Mount Lemmon	Mount Lemmon Survey	·	2.4 km	MPC · JPL
199514	2006 DW_{134}	—	February 25, 2006	Mount Lemmon	Mount Lemmon Survey	·	3.2 km	MPC · JPL
199515	2006 DF_{135}	—	February 25, 2006	Mount Lemmon	Mount Lemmon Survey	AGN	1.6 km	MPC · JPL
199516	2006 DM_{137}	—	February 25, 2006	Kitt Peak	Spacewatch	NYS	1.4 km	MPC · JPL
199517	2006 DJ_{139}	—	February 25, 2006	Kitt Peak	Spacewatch	·	2.2 km	MPC · JPL
199518	2006 DQ_{141}	—	February 25, 2006	Kitt Peak	Spacewatch	(12739)	2.7 km	MPC · JPL
199519	2006 DH_{143}	—	February 25, 2006	Mount Lemmon	Mount Lemmon Survey	KOR	1.9 km	MPC · JPL
199520	2006 DT_{143}	—	February 25, 2006	Mount Lemmon	Mount Lemmon Survey	·	2.9 km	MPC · JPL
199521	2006 DX_{143}	—	February 25, 2006	Mount Lemmon	Mount Lemmon Survey	HOF	4.4 km	MPC · JPL
199522	2006 DX_{147}	—	February 25, 2006	Kitt Peak	Spacewatch	KOR	1.9 km	MPC · JPL
199523	2006 DM_{150}	—	February 25, 2006	Kitt Peak	Spacewatch	(5)	1.8 km	MPC · JPL
199524	2006 DV_{152}	—	February 25, 2006	Kitt Peak	Spacewatch	·	2.5 km	MPC · JPL
199525	2006 DJ_{156}	—	February 27, 2006	Kitt Peak	Spacewatch	·	2.0 km	MPC · JPL
199526	2006 DC_{164}	—	February 27, 2006	Mount Lemmon	Mount Lemmon Survey	NYS	1.2 km	MPC · JPL
199527	2006 DT_{179}	—	February 27, 2006	Mount Lemmon	Mount Lemmon Survey	AGN	2.0 km	MPC · JPL
199528	2006 DF_{188}	—	February 27, 2006	Kitt Peak	Spacewatch	·	3.5 km	MPC · JPL
199529	2006 DB_{189}	—	February 27, 2006	Kitt Peak	Spacewatch	·	3.4 km	MPC · JPL
199530	2006 DJ_{190}	—	February 27, 2006	Kitt Peak	Spacewatch	·	2.3 km	MPC · JPL
199531	2006 DV_{191}	—	February 27, 2006	Kitt Peak	Spacewatch	·	2.0 km	MPC · JPL
199532	2006 DX_{196}	—	February 24, 2006	Catalina	CSS	EUN	2.0 km	MPC · JPL
199533	2006 DN_{197}	—	February 24, 2006	Catalina	CSS	·	2.9 km	MPC · JPL
199534	2006 DM_{198}	—	February 27, 2006	Mount Lemmon	Mount Lemmon Survey	THM	3.6 km	MPC · JPL
199535	2006 DU_{199}	—	February 24, 2006	Catalina	CSS	·	2.9 km	MPC · JPL
199536	2006 DT_{201}	—	February 20, 2006	Catalina	CSS	·	6.8 km	MPC · JPL
199537	2006 DY_{201}	—	February 20, 2006	Socorro	LINEAR	·	4.6 km	MPC · JPL
199538	2006 DE_{203}	—	February 22, 2006	Anderson Mesa	LONEOS	·	3.5 km	MPC · JPL
199539	2006 DN_{203}	—	February 22, 2006	Catalina	CSS	·	2.1 km	MPC · JPL
199540	2006 DD_{206}	—	February 25, 2006	Mount Lemmon	Mount Lemmon Survey	·	2.4 km	MPC · JPL
199541	2006 DV_{206}	—	February 25, 2006	Mount Lemmon	Mount Lemmon Survey	·	2.8 km	MPC · JPL
199542	2006 DM_{208}	—	February 25, 2006	Kitt Peak	Spacewatch	·	2.6 km	MPC · JPL
199543	2006 DL_{210}	—	February 20, 2006	Kitt Peak	Spacewatch	·	3.9 km	MPC · JPL
199544	2006 DG_{212}	—	February 25, 2006	Mount Lemmon	Mount Lemmon Survey	·	2.5 km	MPC · JPL
199545	2006 DB_{215}	—	February 25, 2006	Mount Lemmon	Mount Lemmon Survey	KOR	1.7 km	MPC · JPL
199546	2006 DT_{216}	—	February 21, 2006	Mount Lemmon	Mount Lemmon Survey	·	2.0 km	MPC · JPL
199547	2006 ET_{7}	—	March 2, 2006	Kitt Peak	Spacewatch	·	1.5 km	MPC · JPL
199548	2006 EN_{10}	—	March 2, 2006	Kitt Peak	Spacewatch	·	2.9 km	MPC · JPL
199549	2006 EQ_{11}	—	March 2, 2006	Kitt Peak	Spacewatch	·	1.9 km	MPC · JPL
199550	2006 EE_{15}	—	March 2, 2006	Kitt Peak	Spacewatch	AST	3.6 km	MPC · JPL
199551	2006 EE_{17}	—	March 2, 2006	Mount Lemmon	Mount Lemmon Survey	KOR	2.0 km	MPC · JPL
199552	2006 EC_{18}	—	March 2, 2006	Mount Lemmon	Mount Lemmon Survey	·	2.3 km	MPC · JPL
199553	2006 EU_{18}	—	March 2, 2006	Kitt Peak	Spacewatch	(29841)	2.1 km	MPC · JPL
199554	2006 EA_{20}	—	March 2, 2006	Kitt Peak	Spacewatch	·	2.6 km	MPC · JPL
199555	2006 EV_{24}	—	March 3, 2006	Kitt Peak	Spacewatch	HYG	2.9 km	MPC · JPL
199556	2006 EF_{27}	—	March 3, 2006	Socorro	LINEAR	·	5.2 km	MPC · JPL
199557	2006 EQ_{34}	—	March 3, 2006	Kitt Peak	Spacewatch	·	1.7 km	MPC · JPL
199558	2006 EV_{34}	—	March 3, 2006	Kitt Peak	Spacewatch	·	4.0 km	MPC · JPL
199559	2006 EZ_{34}	—	March 3, 2006	Kitt Peak	Spacewatch	KOR	2.0 km	MPC · JPL
199560	2006 EB_{40}	—	March 4, 2006	Kitt Peak	Spacewatch	·	2.5 km	MPC · JPL
199561	2006 EO_{40}	—	March 4, 2006	Kitt Peak	Spacewatch	·	3.3 km	MPC · JPL
199562	2006 EO_{41}	—	March 4, 2006	Catalina	CSS	·	2.1 km	MPC · JPL
199563	2006 EP_{41}	—	March 4, 2006	Catalina	CSS	·	3.9 km	MPC · JPL
199564	2006 ES_{41}	—	March 4, 2006	Catalina	CSS	·	6.1 km	MPC · JPL
199565	2006 EH_{43}	—	March 5, 2006	Kitt Peak	Spacewatch	·	2.0 km	MPC · JPL
199566	2006 EG_{47}	—	March 4, 2006	Kitt Peak	Spacewatch	(17392)	2.3 km	MPC · JPL
199567	2006 EA_{48}	—	March 4, 2006	Kitt Peak	Spacewatch	·	4.8 km	MPC · JPL
199568	2006 EF_{48}	—	March 4, 2006	Kitt Peak	Spacewatch	·	2.7 km	MPC · JPL
199569	2006 ED_{57}	—	March 5, 2006	Kitt Peak	Spacewatch	·	3.4 km	MPC · JPL
199570	2006 EA_{58}	—	March 5, 2006	Kitt Peak	Spacewatch	·	2.1 km	MPC · JPL
199571	2006 EK_{62}	—	March 5, 2006	Kitt Peak	Spacewatch	DOR	3.9 km	MPC · JPL
199572	2006 EN_{65}	—	March 5, 2006	Kitt Peak	Spacewatch	·	2.0 km	MPC · JPL
199573	2006 EE_{67}	—	March 8, 2006	Kitt Peak	Spacewatch	·	3.1 km	MPC · JPL
199574 Webbert	2006 EX_{67}	Webbert	March 2, 2006	Kitt Peak	M. W. Buie	·	880 m	MPC · JPL
199575	2006 EU_{72}	—	March 5, 2006	Kitt Peak	Spacewatch	·	2.1 km	MPC · JPL
199576	2006 EZ_{72}	—	March 3, 2006	Kitt Peak	Spacewatch	NEM	3.2 km	MPC · JPL
199577	2006 FH_{1}	—	March 21, 2006	Mount Lemmon	Mount Lemmon Survey	·	1.3 km	MPC · JPL
199578	2006 FQ_{2}	—	March 23, 2006	Kitt Peak	Spacewatch	·	3.5 km	MPC · JPL
199579	2006 FV_{2}	—	March 23, 2006	Kitt Peak	Spacewatch	·	1.3 km	MPC · JPL
199580	2006 FD_{3}	—	March 23, 2006	Kitt Peak	Spacewatch	KOR	1.8 km	MPC · JPL
199581	2006 FM_{8}	—	March 23, 2006	Mount Lemmon	Mount Lemmon Survey	·	1.4 km	MPC · JPL
199582	2006 FT_{8}	—	March 23, 2006	Mount Lemmon	Mount Lemmon Survey	KOR	2.1 km	MPC · JPL
199583	2006 FO_{10}	—	March 21, 2006	Socorro	LINEAR	·	4.7 km	MPC · JPL
199584	2006 FS_{12}	—	March 23, 2006	Kitt Peak	Spacewatch	·	4.1 km	MPC · JPL
199585	2006 FP_{13}	—	March 23, 2006	Kitt Peak	Spacewatch	·	4.9 km	MPC · JPL
199586	2006 FH_{14}	—	March 23, 2006	Kitt Peak	Spacewatch	·	3.3 km	MPC · JPL
199587	2006 FD_{16}	—	March 23, 2006	Mount Lemmon	Mount Lemmon Survey	NEM	2.7 km	MPC · JPL
199588	2006 FO_{16}	—	March 23, 2006	Mount Lemmon	Mount Lemmon Survey	·	3.1 km	MPC · JPL
199589	2006 FV_{17}	—	March 23, 2006	Kitt Peak	Spacewatch	fast	2.0 km	MPC · JPL
199590	2006 FC_{18}	—	March 23, 2006	Kitt Peak	Spacewatch	EOS	2.8 km	MPC · JPL
199591	2006 FJ_{19}	—	March 23, 2006	Mount Lemmon	Mount Lemmon Survey	·	4.3 km	MPC · JPL
199592	2006 FU_{19}	—	March 23, 2006	Mount Lemmon	Mount Lemmon Survey	KOR	1.6 km	MPC · JPL
199593	2006 FB_{20}	—	March 23, 2006	Mount Lemmon	Mount Lemmon Survey	KOR	1.9 km	MPC · JPL
199594	2006 FC_{20}	—	March 23, 2006	Mount Lemmon	Mount Lemmon Survey	·	2.3 km	MPC · JPL
199595	2006 FH_{20}	—	March 23, 2006	Mount Lemmon	Mount Lemmon Survey	·	2.8 km	MPC · JPL
199596	2006 FD_{23}	—	March 24, 2006	Mount Lemmon	Mount Lemmon Survey	·	3.3 km	MPC · JPL
199597	2006 FK_{23}	—	March 24, 2006	Kitt Peak	Spacewatch	·	2.3 km	MPC · JPL
199598	2006 FV_{23}	—	March 24, 2006	Kitt Peak	Spacewatch	·	2.3 km	MPC · JPL
199599	2006 FX_{23}	—	March 24, 2006	Kitt Peak	Spacewatch	(5)	1.5 km	MPC · JPL
199600	2006 FS_{24}	—	March 24, 2006	Kitt Peak	Spacewatch	HOF	4.3 km	MPC · JPL

== 199601–199700 ==
back to top

Designation			Discovery			Properties		Ref
Permanent	Provisional	Named after	Date	Site	Discoverer(s)	Category	Diam.	Ref
199601	2006 FU_{24}	—	March 24, 2006	Kitt Peak	Spacewatch	·	1.7 km	MPC · JPL
199602	2006 FH_{25}	—	March 24, 2006	Kitt Peak	Spacewatch	·	3.1 km	MPC · JPL
199603	2006 FN_{25}	—	March 24, 2006	Kitt Peak	Spacewatch	·	2.8 km	MPC · JPL
199604	2006 FN_{26}	—	March 24, 2006	Socorro	LINEAR	·	4.5 km	MPC · JPL
199605	2006 FG_{34}	—	March 24, 2006	Catalina	CSS	·	2.7 km	MPC · JPL
199606	2006 FL_{34}	—	March 24, 2006	Mount Lemmon	Mount Lemmon Survey	·	4.9 km	MPC · JPL
199607	2006 FP_{34}	—	March 25, 2006	Palomar	NEAT	·	4.3 km	MPC · JPL
199608	2006 FK_{35}	—	March 24, 2006	Kitt Peak	Spacewatch	·	3.9 km	MPC · JPL
199609	2006 FR_{36}	—	March 21, 2006	Socorro	LINEAR	·	3.1 km	MPC · JPL
199610	2006 FJ_{37}	—	March 24, 2006	Catalina	CSS	·	5.2 km	MPC · JPL
199611	2006 FS_{38}	—	March 23, 2006	Kitt Peak	Spacewatch	HYG	6.6 km	MPC · JPL
199612	2006 FE_{39}	—	March 23, 2006	Catalina	CSS	KOR	2.1 km	MPC · JPL
199613	2006 FN_{40}	—	March 25, 2006	Kitt Peak	Spacewatch	·	2.4 km	MPC · JPL
199614	2006 FQ_{40}	—	March 26, 2006	Kitt Peak	Spacewatch	ANF	2.0 km	MPC · JPL
199615	2006 FD_{41}	—	March 26, 2006	Mount Lemmon	Mount Lemmon Survey	·	3.0 km	MPC · JPL
199616	2006 FX_{41}	—	March 26, 2006	Mount Lemmon	Mount Lemmon Survey	NYS	2.0 km	MPC · JPL
199617	2006 FR_{42}	—	March 26, 2006	Mount Lemmon	Mount Lemmon Survey	KOR	2.1 km	MPC · JPL
199618	2006 FG_{43}	—	March 29, 2006	Socorro	LINEAR	EOS	3.4 km	MPC · JPL
199619	2006 FT_{43}	—	March 23, 2006	Catalina	CSS	·	1.3 km	MPC · JPL
199620	2006 FN_{44}	—	March 23, 2006	Kitt Peak	Spacewatch	·	4.3 km	MPC · JPL
199621	2006 FL_{45}	—	March 24, 2006	Socorro	LINEAR	·	4.4 km	MPC · JPL
199622	2006 FR_{45}	—	March 24, 2006	Anderson Mesa	LONEOS	·	3.8 km	MPC · JPL
199623	2006 FV_{45}	—	March 25, 2006	Jarnac	Jarnac	·	3.1 km	MPC · JPL
199624	2006 FD_{46}	—	March 25, 2006	Mount Lemmon	Mount Lemmon Survey	·	4.7 km	MPC · JPL
199625	2006 FH_{47}	—	March 23, 2006	Catalina	CSS	·	3.7 km	MPC · JPL
199626	2006 FV_{49}	—	March 26, 2006	Anderson Mesa	LONEOS	·	3.7 km	MPC · JPL
199627	2006 FV_{52}	—	March 25, 2006	Kitt Peak	Spacewatch	EUN	1.6 km	MPC · JPL
199628	2006 FA_{53}	—	March 23, 2006	Kitt Peak	Spacewatch	·	3.9 km	MPC · JPL
199629	2006 FB_{53}	—	March 23, 2006	Kitt Peak	Spacewatch	AGN	1.9 km	MPC · JPL
199630 Szitkay	2006 GS	Szitkay	April 2, 2006	Piszkéstető	K. Sárneczky	·	2.9 km	MPC · JPL
199631 Giuseppesprizzi	2006 GX	Giuseppesprizzi	April 2, 2006	Vallemare di Borbona	V. S. Casulli	AGN	2.0 km	MPC · JPL
199632 Mahlerede	2006 GX_{1}	Mahlerede	April 2, 2006	Piszkéstető	K. Sárneczky	·	3.1 km	MPC · JPL
199633	2006 GF_{3}	—	April 7, 2006	Ottmarsheim	C. Rinner	DOR	4.4 km	MPC · JPL
199634	2006 GA_{4}	—	April 2, 2006	Kitt Peak	Spacewatch	·	2.0 km	MPC · JPL
199635	2006 GW_{4}	—	April 2, 2006	Kitt Peak	Spacewatch	·	2.6 km	MPC · JPL
199636	2006 GU_{5}	—	April 2, 2006	Kitt Peak	Spacewatch	HYG	5.5 km	MPC · JPL
199637	2006 GY_{5}	—	April 2, 2006	Kitt Peak	Spacewatch	·	3.3 km	MPC · JPL
199638	2006 GH_{9}	—	April 2, 2006	Kitt Peak	Spacewatch	(17392)	2.3 km	MPC · JPL
199639	2006 GF_{11}	—	April 2, 2006	Kitt Peak	Spacewatch	·	4.1 km	MPC · JPL
199640	2006 GC_{12}	—	April 2, 2006	Kitt Peak	Spacewatch	HNS	1.7 km	MPC · JPL
199641	2006 GR_{12}	—	April 2, 2006	Kitt Peak	Spacewatch	·	2.7 km	MPC · JPL
199642	2006 GF_{17}	—	April 2, 2006	Kitt Peak	Spacewatch	·	2.9 km	MPC · JPL
199643	2006 GO_{17}	—	April 2, 2006	Kitt Peak	Spacewatch	·	3.0 km	MPC · JPL
199644	2006 GB_{18}	—	April 2, 2006	Kitt Peak	Spacewatch	·	5.2 km	MPC · JPL
199645	2006 GD_{18}	—	April 2, 2006	Kitt Peak	Spacewatch	·	2.5 km	MPC · JPL
199646	2006 GC_{21}	—	April 2, 2006	Kitt Peak	Spacewatch	·	3.2 km	MPC · JPL
199647	2006 GR_{21}	—	April 2, 2006	Mount Lemmon	Mount Lemmon Survey	·	2.2 km	MPC · JPL
199648	2006 GT_{22}	—	April 2, 2006	Kitt Peak	Spacewatch	·	4.7 km	MPC · JPL
199649	2006 GM_{23}	—	April 2, 2006	Kitt Peak	Spacewatch	EOS	2.7 km	MPC · JPL
199650	2006 GK_{30}	—	April 2, 2006	Mount Lemmon	Mount Lemmon Survey	·	1.8 km	MPC · JPL
199651	2006 GV_{31}	—	April 6, 2006	Bergisch Gladbach	W. Bickel	EOS	3.4 km	MPC · JPL
199652	2006 GW_{32}	—	April 7, 2006	Mount Lemmon	Mount Lemmon Survey	THM	3.4 km	MPC · JPL
199653	2006 GF_{37}	—	April 8, 2006	Mount Lemmon	Mount Lemmon Survey	KOR	1.9 km	MPC · JPL
199654	2006 GL_{38}	—	April 2, 2006	Anderson Mesa	LONEOS	T_{j} (2.99)	7.2 km	MPC · JPL
199655	2006 GC_{39}	—	April 12, 2006	Palomar	NEAT	slow	2.0 km	MPC · JPL
199656	2006 GC_{42}	—	April 8, 2006	Siding Spring	SSS	·	4.8 km	MPC · JPL
199657	2006 GP_{42}	—	April 7, 2006	Catalina	CSS	·	4.7 km	MPC · JPL
199658	2006 GD_{43}	—	April 2, 2006	Kitt Peak	Spacewatch	(5)	1.5 km	MPC · JPL
199659	2006 GD_{44}	—	April 2, 2006	Kitt Peak	Spacewatch	·	1.9 km	MPC · JPL
199660	2006 GR_{45}	—	April 8, 2006	Mount Lemmon	Mount Lemmon Survey	V	1.3 km	MPC · JPL
199661	2006 GV_{46}	—	April 9, 2006	Kitt Peak	Spacewatch	·	2.7 km	MPC · JPL
199662	2006 GB_{47}	—	April 9, 2006	Kitt Peak	Spacewatch	·	4.8 km	MPC · JPL
199663	2006 GG_{47}	—	April 9, 2006	Kitt Peak	Spacewatch	·	3.8 km	MPC · JPL
199664	2006 GX_{47}	—	April 9, 2006	Kitt Peak	Spacewatch	·	3.4 km	MPC · JPL
199665	2006 GX_{48}	—	April 9, 2006	Kitt Peak	Spacewatch	·	2.4 km	MPC · JPL
199666	2006 GA_{49}	—	April 9, 2006	Kitt Peak	Spacewatch	HYG	4.8 km	MPC · JPL
199667	2006 GF_{50}	—	April 8, 2006	Siding Spring	SSS	·	3.8 km	MPC · JPL
199668	2006 GH_{50}	—	April 9, 2006	Catalina	CSS	·	2.2 km	MPC · JPL
199669	2006 GM_{52}	—	April 7, 2006	Catalina	CSS	EOS	3.2 km	MPC · JPL
199670	2006 GM_{54}	—	April 2, 2006	Kitt Peak	Spacewatch	·	2.7 km	MPC · JPL
199671	2006 HV	—	April 18, 2006	Kitt Peak	Spacewatch	(5)	2.2 km	MPC · JPL
199672	2006 HV_{2}	—	April 18, 2006	Kitt Peak	Spacewatch	·	3.6 km	MPC · JPL
199673	2006 HH_{3}	—	April 18, 2006	Kitt Peak	Spacewatch	·	4.5 km	MPC · JPL
199674	2006 HX_{3}	—	April 18, 2006	Kitt Peak	Spacewatch	·	4.4 km	MPC · JPL
199675	2006 HE_{4}	—	April 19, 2006	Mount Lemmon	Mount Lemmon Survey	·	1.9 km	MPC · JPL
199676	2006 HC_{5}	—	April 19, 2006	Palomar	NEAT	·	2.9 km	MPC · JPL
199677 Terzani	2006 HH_{6}	Terzani	April 20, 2006	Vallemare di Borbona	V. S. Casulli	·	4.6 km	MPC · JPL
199678	2006 HA_{8}	—	April 18, 2006	Kitt Peak	Spacewatch	·	6.3 km	MPC · JPL
199679	2006 HN_{8}	—	April 19, 2006	Kitt Peak	Spacewatch	·	3.2 km	MPC · JPL
199680	2006 HT_{8}	—	April 19, 2006	Kitt Peak	Spacewatch	·	3.1 km	MPC · JPL
199681	2006 HQ_{12}	—	April 19, 2006	Mount Lemmon	Mount Lemmon Survey	KOR	2.0 km	MPC · JPL
199682	2006 HV_{13}	—	April 19, 2006	Palomar	NEAT	·	4.7 km	MPC · JPL
199683	2006 HL_{15}	—	April 19, 2006	Palomar	NEAT	·	3.0 km	MPC · JPL
199684	2006 HY_{16}	—	April 20, 2006	Junk Bond	D. Healy	·	2.8 km	MPC · JPL
199685	2006 HJ_{17}	—	April 19, 2006	Palomar	NEAT	·	2.1 km	MPC · JPL
199686	2006 HK_{17}	—	April 21, 2006	RAS	Lowe, A.	·	5.2 km	MPC · JPL
199687 Erősszsolt	2006 HA_{18}	Erősszsolt	April 21, 2006	Piszkéstető	K. Sárneczky	THM	3.1 km	MPC · JPL
199688 Kisspéter	2006 HK_{18}	Kisspéter	April 21, 2006	Piszkéstető	K. Sárneczky	EOS	2.1 km	MPC · JPL
199689	2006 HA_{22}	—	April 20, 2006	Kitt Peak	Spacewatch	·	2.6 km	MPC · JPL
199690	2006 HG_{22}	—	April 20, 2006	Kitt Peak	Spacewatch	AGN	1.4 km	MPC · JPL
199691	2006 HO_{23}	—	April 20, 2006	Kitt Peak	Spacewatch	JUN	1.4 km	MPC · JPL
199692	2006 HT_{23}	—	April 20, 2006	Kitt Peak	Spacewatch	·	3.6 km	MPC · JPL
199693	2006 HB_{24}	—	April 20, 2006	Kitt Peak	Spacewatch	·	3.5 km	MPC · JPL
199694	2006 HE_{28}	—	April 20, 2006	Kitt Peak	Spacewatch	·	3.1 km	MPC · JPL
199695	2006 HB_{30}	—	April 19, 2006	Catalina	CSS	·	1.8 km	MPC · JPL
199696 Kemenesi	2006 HD_{31}	Kemenesi	April 25, 2006	Piszkéstető	K. Sárneczky	·	5.5 km	MPC · JPL
199697	2006 HC_{33}	—	April 19, 2006	Palomar	NEAT	·	5.0 km	MPC · JPL
199698	2006 HG_{35}	—	April 19, 2006	Mount Lemmon	Mount Lemmon Survey	THM	3.5 km	MPC · JPL
199699	2006 HC_{40}	—	April 21, 2006	Kitt Peak	Spacewatch	EOS	2.8 km	MPC · JPL
199700	2006 HF_{40}	—	April 21, 2006	Kitt Peak	Spacewatch	CYB	3.8 km	MPC · JPL

== 199701–199800 ==
back to top

Designation			Discovery			Properties		Ref
Permanent	Provisional	Named after	Date	Site	Discoverer(s)	Category	Diam.	Ref
199701	2006 HV_{40}	—	April 21, 2006	Kitt Peak	Spacewatch	JUN	1.3 km	MPC · JPL
199702	2006 HB_{41}	—	April 21, 2006	Kitt Peak	Spacewatch	·	6.4 km	MPC · JPL
199703	2006 HR_{42}	—	April 24, 2006	Anderson Mesa	LONEOS	·	3.2 km	MPC · JPL
199704	2006 HF_{43}	—	April 24, 2006	Mount Lemmon	Mount Lemmon Survey	·	3.7 km	MPC · JPL
199705	2006 HR_{45}	—	April 25, 2006	Kitt Peak	Spacewatch	THM	3.7 km	MPC · JPL
199706	2006 HW_{45}	—	April 25, 2006	Kitt Peak	Spacewatch	·	3.0 km	MPC · JPL
199707	2006 HU_{46}	—	April 20, 2006	Kitt Peak	Spacewatch	·	3.4 km	MPC · JPL
199708	2006 HD_{56}	—	April 25, 2006	Kitt Peak	Spacewatch	·	3.3 km	MPC · JPL
199709	2006 HU_{56}	—	April 19, 2006	Palomar	NEAT	·	6.3 km	MPC · JPL
199710	2006 HL_{58}	—	April 30, 2006	Kanab	Sheridan, E. E.	·	2.3 km	MPC · JPL
199711	2006 HR_{59}	—	April 24, 2006	Socorro	LINEAR	·	3.4 km	MPC · JPL
199712	2006 HY_{60}	—	April 28, 2006	Socorro	LINEAR	·	5.2 km	MPC · JPL
199713	2006 HD_{65}	—	April 24, 2006	Kitt Peak	Spacewatch	·	3.9 km	MPC · JPL
199714	2006 HK_{68}	—	April 24, 2006	Mount Lemmon	Mount Lemmon Survey	·	4.3 km	MPC · JPL
199715	2006 HJ_{78}	—	April 26, 2006	Kitt Peak	Spacewatch	3:2	7.0 km	MPC · JPL
199716	2006 HS_{79}	—	April 26, 2006	Kitt Peak	Spacewatch	·	2.5 km	MPC · JPL
199717	2006 HZ_{81}	—	April 26, 2006	Kitt Peak	Spacewatch	EOS	2.4 km	MPC · JPL
199718	2006 HE_{83}	—	April 26, 2006	Kitt Peak	Spacewatch	·	5.4 km	MPC · JPL
199719	2006 HV_{83}	—	April 26, 2006	Kitt Peak	Spacewatch	·	5.5 km	MPC · JPL
199720	2006 HV_{84}	—	April 26, 2006	Kitt Peak	Spacewatch	URS	5.3 km	MPC · JPL
199721	2006 HX_{84}	—	April 26, 2006	Kitt Peak	Spacewatch	·	5.8 km	MPC · JPL
199722	2006 HS_{85}	—	April 27, 2006	Kitt Peak	Spacewatch	·	2.5 km	MPC · JPL
199723	2006 HR_{86}	—	April 27, 2006	Socorro	LINEAR	(5)	1.8 km	MPC · JPL
199724	2006 HE_{87}	—	April 30, 2006	Kitt Peak	Spacewatch	·	4.6 km	MPC · JPL
199725	2006 HO_{87}	—	April 30, 2006	Kitt Peak	Spacewatch	·	2.5 km	MPC · JPL
199726	2006 HR_{87}	—	April 30, 2006	Kitt Peak	Spacewatch	GEF	2.0 km	MPC · JPL
199727	2006 HJ_{88}	—	April 30, 2006	Kitt Peak	Spacewatch	·	2.7 km	MPC · JPL
199728	2006 HF_{95}	—	April 30, 2006	Kitt Peak	Spacewatch	·	2.7 km	MPC · JPL
199729	2006 HO_{101}	—	April 30, 2006	Kitt Peak	Spacewatch	EOS	3.1 km	MPC · JPL
199730	2006 HX_{104}	—	April 19, 2006	Catalina	CSS	EOS	2.8 km	MPC · JPL
199731	2006 HO_{107}	—	April 30, 2006	Kitt Peak	Spacewatch	·	3.9 km	MPC · JPL
199732	2006 HR_{109}	—	April 30, 2006	Catalina	CSS	·	4.4 km	MPC · JPL
199733	2006 HY_{109}	—	April 21, 2006	Palomar	NEAT	MAR	1.9 km	MPC · JPL
199734	2006 HK_{110}	—	April 26, 2006	Siding Spring	SSS	·	8.1 km	MPC · JPL
199735	2006 HF_{111}	—	April 24, 2006	Anderson Mesa	LONEOS	·	4.5 km	MPC · JPL
199736	2006 HA_{112}	—	April 30, 2006	Catalina	CSS	·	3.2 km	MPC · JPL
199737	2006 HX_{113}	—	April 25, 2006	Mount Lemmon	Mount Lemmon Survey	·	2.7 km	MPC · JPL
199738	2006 HG_{115}	—	April 26, 2006	Kitt Peak	Spacewatch	AST	2.2 km	MPC · JPL
199739	2006 HU_{123}	—	April 24, 2006	Kitt Peak	Spacewatch	·	1.9 km	MPC · JPL
199740	2006 HX_{151}	—	April 19, 2006	Mount Lemmon	Mount Lemmon Survey	AGN	1.6 km	MPC · JPL
199741 Weidner	2006 HC_{152}	Weidner	April 26, 2006	Cerro Tololo	M. W. Buie	·	3.0 km	MPC · JPL
199742	2006 JD	—	May 1, 2006	Wrightwood	J. W. Young	EOS	3.1 km	MPC · JPL
199743	2006 JS_{2}	—	May 2, 2006	Mount Lemmon	Mount Lemmon Survey	·	5.5 km	MPC · JPL
199744	2006 JP_{8}	—	May 1, 2006	Kitt Peak	Spacewatch	EOS	2.3 km	MPC · JPL
199745	2006 JF_{9}	—	May 1, 2006	Kitt Peak	Spacewatch	·	5.5 km	MPC · JPL
199746	2006 JZ_{11}	—	May 1, 2006	Kitt Peak	Spacewatch	TEL	3.4 km	MPC · JPL
199747	2006 JX_{13}	—	May 3, 2006	Kitt Peak	Spacewatch	·	3.2 km	MPC · JPL
199748	2006 JD_{14}	—	May 4, 2006	Mount Lemmon	Mount Lemmon Survey	·	3.6 km	MPC · JPL
199749	2006 JH_{14}	—	May 4, 2006	Mount Lemmon	Mount Lemmon Survey	MRX	1.4 km	MPC · JPL
199750	2006 JO_{25}	—	May 5, 2006	Mount Lemmon	Mount Lemmon Survey	·	2.6 km	MPC · JPL
199751	2006 JL_{27}	—	May 1, 2006	Socorro	LINEAR	·	2.7 km	MPC · JPL
199752	2006 JS_{28}	—	May 3, 2006	Kitt Peak	Spacewatch	·	3.5 km	MPC · JPL
199753	2006 JD_{36}	—	May 4, 2006	Kitt Peak	Spacewatch	RAF	1.6 km	MPC · JPL
199754	2006 JJ_{38}	—	May 6, 2006	Mount Lemmon	Mount Lemmon Survey	·	4.5 km	MPC · JPL
199755	2006 JD_{39}	—	May 6, 2006	Mount Lemmon	Mount Lemmon Survey	KOR	2.2 km	MPC · JPL
199756	2006 JN_{40}	—	May 7, 2006	Kitt Peak	Spacewatch	·	2.1 km	MPC · JPL
199757 Shagunsingh	2006 JB_{45}	Shagunsingh	May 7, 2006	Mount Lemmon	Mount Lemmon Survey	·	6.3 km	MPC · JPL
199758	2006 JU_{46}	—	May 1, 2006	Socorro	LINEAR	·	4.0 km	MPC · JPL
199759	2006 JH_{48}	—	May 5, 2006	Anderson Mesa	LONEOS	·	1.9 km	MPC · JPL
199760	2006 JB_{50}	—	May 2, 2006	Mount Lemmon	Mount Lemmon Survey	EOS	2.5 km	MPC · JPL
199761	2006 JT_{50}	—	May 2, 2006	Mount Lemmon	Mount Lemmon Survey	·	4.1 km	MPC · JPL
199762	2006 JC_{56}	—	May 1, 2006	Socorro	LINEAR	·	5.7 km	MPC · JPL
199763 Davidgregory	2006 JJ_{77}	Davidgregory	May 1, 2006	Mauna Kea	P. A. Wiegert	·	3.2 km	MPC · JPL
199764	2006 KN_{1}	—	May 20, 2006	Reedy Creek	J. Broughton	·	4.6 km	MPC · JPL
199765	2006 KT_{3}	—	May 19, 2006	Mount Lemmon	Mount Lemmon Survey	·	1.6 km	MPC · JPL
199766	2006 KJ_{4}	—	May 19, 2006	Mount Lemmon	Mount Lemmon Survey	·	4.4 km	MPC · JPL
199767	2006 KW_{12}	—	May 20, 2006	Kitt Peak	Spacewatch	·	3.0 km	MPC · JPL
199768	2006 KN_{16}	—	May 21, 2006	Mount Lemmon	Mount Lemmon Survey	AST	3.1 km	MPC · JPL
199769	2006 KA_{22}	—	May 19, 2006	Catalina	CSS	·	4.2 km	MPC · JPL
199770	2006 KB_{23}	—	May 20, 2006	Anderson Mesa	LONEOS	·	5.2 km	MPC · JPL
199771	2006 KQ_{23}	—	May 16, 2006	Siding Spring	SSS	·	5.0 km	MPC · JPL
199772	2006 KY_{23}	—	May 19, 2006	Anderson Mesa	LONEOS	·	4.8 km	MPC · JPL
199773	2006 KB_{28}	—	May 20, 2006	Kitt Peak	Spacewatch	·	3.5 km	MPC · JPL
199774	2006 KK_{30}	—	May 20, 2006	Kitt Peak	Spacewatch	THM	3.3 km	MPC · JPL
199775	2006 KL_{31}	—	May 20, 2006	Kitt Peak	Spacewatch	KOR	1.6 km	MPC · JPL
199776	2006 KF_{36}	—	May 20, 2006	Kitt Peak	Spacewatch	·	7.1 km	MPC · JPL
199777	2006 KL_{53}	—	May 21, 2006	Kitt Peak	Spacewatch	AGN	1.5 km	MPC · JPL
199778	2006 KW_{60}	—	May 22, 2006	Kitt Peak	Spacewatch	·	3.8 km	MPC · JPL
199779	2006 KV_{72}	—	May 23, 2006	Kitt Peak	Spacewatch	·	3.8 km	MPC · JPL
199780	2006 KY_{75}	—	May 24, 2006	Palomar	NEAT	·	2.7 km	MPC · JPL
199781	2006 KJ_{80}	—	May 25, 2006	Mount Lemmon	Mount Lemmon Survey	·	4.8 km	MPC · JPL
199782	2006 KZ_{89}	—	May 22, 2006	Siding Spring	SSS	·	2.2 km	MPC · JPL
199783	2006 KG_{98}	—	May 26, 2006	Kitt Peak	Spacewatch	·	5.1 km	MPC · JPL
199784	2006 KL_{105}	—	May 30, 2006	Mount Lemmon	Mount Lemmon Survey	·	3.1 km	MPC · JPL
199785	2006 KK_{110}	—	May 31, 2006	Mount Lemmon	Mount Lemmon Survey	·	3.7 km	MPC · JPL
199786	2006 KQ_{115}	—	May 29, 2006	Kitt Peak	Spacewatch	EOS	2.9 km	MPC · JPL
199787	2006 LG_{3}	—	June 15, 2006	Kitt Peak	Spacewatch	·	3.4 km	MPC · JPL
199788	2006 LU_{3}	—	June 15, 2006	Kitt Peak	Spacewatch	VER	5.3 km	MPC · JPL
199789	2006 MV_{5}	—	June 17, 2006	Kitt Peak	Spacewatch	·	3.5 km	MPC · JPL
199790	2006 MN_{7}	—	June 18, 2006	Kitt Peak	Spacewatch	·	4.5 km	MPC · JPL
199791	2006 MN_{9}	—	June 19, 2006	Kitt Peak	Spacewatch	L4	15 km	MPC · JPL
199792	2006 PJ_{1}	—	August 6, 2006	Lulin Observatory	Lin, C.-S., Q. Ye	L4	16 km	MPC · JPL
199793	2006 PK_{14}	—	August 15, 2006	Palomar	NEAT	L4	15 km	MPC · JPL
199794	2006 QF_{105}	—	August 28, 2006	Catalina	CSS	·	4.7 km	MPC · JPL
199795	2006 UB_{198}	—	October 20, 2006	Kitt Peak	Spacewatch	·	2.0 km	MPC · JPL
199796	2006 UN_{217}	—	October 28, 2006	Mount Lemmon	Mount Lemmon Survey	L4	11 km	MPC · JPL
199797	2006 UY_{240}	—	October 23, 2006	Mount Lemmon	Mount Lemmon Survey	·	2.1 km	MPC · JPL
199798	2006 UF_{256}	—	October 27, 2006	Mount Lemmon	Mount Lemmon Survey	H	890 m	MPC · JPL
199799	2006 WY_{200}	—	November 22, 2006	Mount Lemmon	Mount Lemmon Survey	·	1.7 km	MPC · JPL
199800	2006 YF_{11}	—	December 21, 2006	Palomar	NEAT	H	910 m	MPC · JPL

== 199801–199900 ==
back to top

Designation			Discovery			Properties		Ref
Permanent	Provisional	Named after	Date	Site	Discoverer(s)	Category	Diam.	Ref
199801	2007 AE_{12}	—	January 10, 2007	Mount Lemmon	Mount Lemmon Survey	APO · PHA	480 m	MPC · JPL
199802	2007 BA_{18}	—	January 17, 2007	Kitt Peak	Spacewatch	·	1.1 km	MPC · JPL
199803	2007 BJ_{66}	—	January 27, 2007	Mount Lemmon	Mount Lemmon Survey	MAS	1.1 km	MPC · JPL
199804	2007 BD_{70}	—	January 27, 2007	Mount Lemmon	Mount Lemmon Survey	·	1.9 km	MPC · JPL
199805	2007 BE_{70}	—	January 27, 2007	Mount Lemmon	Mount Lemmon Survey	EUN	1.8 km	MPC · JPL
199806	2007 CA	—	February 5, 2007	Palomar	NEAT	H	1.1 km	MPC · JPL
199807	2007 CY_{51}	—	February 9, 2007	Kitt Peak	Spacewatch	·	1.4 km	MPC · JPL
199808	2007 CA_{57}	—	February 15, 2007	Palomar	NEAT	NYS	2.0 km	MPC · JPL
199809	2007 CE_{61}	—	February 14, 2007	Črni Vrh	J. Skvarč, H. Mikuž	H	930 m	MPC · JPL
199810	2007 DO_{8}	—	February 21, 2007	Catalina	CSS	·	8.6 km	MPC · JPL
199811	2007 DD_{13}	—	February 16, 2007	Palomar	NEAT	·	1.8 km	MPC · JPL
199812	2007 DE_{17}	—	February 17, 2007	Kitt Peak	Spacewatch	·	970 m	MPC · JPL
199813	2007 DN_{28}	—	February 17, 2007	Kitt Peak	Spacewatch	·	1.2 km	MPC · JPL
199814	2007 DD_{33}	—	February 17, 2007	Kitt Peak	Spacewatch	MAS	1.1 km	MPC · JPL
199815	2007 DL_{34}	—	February 17, 2007	Kitt Peak	Spacewatch	MAS	870 m	MPC · JPL
199816	2007 DR_{36}	—	February 17, 2007	Kitt Peak	Spacewatch	·	880 m	MPC · JPL
199817	2007 DY_{49}	—	February 16, 2007	Catalina	CSS	H	790 m	MPC · JPL
199818	2007 DG_{53}	—	February 19, 2007	Mount Lemmon	Mount Lemmon Survey	·	1.4 km	MPC · JPL
199819	2007 DU_{53}	—	February 19, 2007	Mount Lemmon	Mount Lemmon Survey	NYS	1.6 km	MPC · JPL
199820	2007 DF_{71}	—	February 21, 2007	Kitt Peak	Spacewatch	·	990 m	MPC · JPL
199821	2007 DA_{83}	—	February 23, 2007	Catalina	CSS	·	8.2 km	MPC · JPL
199822	2007 DJ_{85}	—	February 21, 2007	Socorro	LINEAR	·	1.1 km	MPC · JPL
199823	2007 DL_{97}	—	February 23, 2007	Kitt Peak	Spacewatch	·	1.8 km	MPC · JPL
199824	2007 DO_{97}	—	February 23, 2007	Kitt Peak	Spacewatch	·	940 m	MPC · JPL
199825	2007 DX_{97}	—	February 23, 2007	Kitt Peak	Spacewatch	·	730 m	MPC · JPL
199826	2007 DB_{105}	—	February 23, 2007	Mount Lemmon	Mount Lemmon Survey	·	820 m	MPC · JPL
199827	2007 DE_{105}	—	February 23, 2007	Mount Lemmon	Mount Lemmon Survey	·	570 m	MPC · JPL
199828	2007 DK_{105}	—	February 27, 2007	Kitt Peak	Spacewatch	·	1.5 km	MPC · JPL
199829	2007 DL_{112}	—	February 25, 2007	Mount Lemmon	Mount Lemmon Survey	·	1.7 km	MPC · JPL
199830	2007 EH_{8}	—	March 9, 2007	Palomar	NEAT	·	1.2 km	MPC · JPL
199831	2007 EA_{15}	—	March 9, 2007	Mount Lemmon	Mount Lemmon Survey	·	780 m	MPC · JPL
199832	2007 EX_{20}	—	March 10, 2007	Kitt Peak	Spacewatch	NYS	1.3 km	MPC · JPL
199833	2007 EP_{23}	—	March 10, 2007	Mount Lemmon	Mount Lemmon Survey	(13314)	4.4 km	MPC · JPL
199834	2007 EG_{24}	—	March 10, 2007	Mount Lemmon	Mount Lemmon Survey	·	2.0 km	MPC · JPL
199835	2007 EK_{25}	—	March 10, 2007	Mount Lemmon	Mount Lemmon Survey	MAS	930 m	MPC · JPL
199836	2007 EE_{27}	—	March 12, 2007	Altschwendt	W. Ries	·	1.2 km	MPC · JPL
199837	2007 EC_{30}	—	March 9, 2007	Kitt Peak	Spacewatch	·	930 m	MPC · JPL
199838 Hafili	2007 EY_{38}	Hafili	March 11, 2007	Vicques	M. Ory	·	3.0 km	MPC · JPL
199839	2007 ER_{45}	—	March 9, 2007	Kitt Peak	Spacewatch	·	1.2 km	MPC · JPL
199840	2007 EB_{47}	—	March 9, 2007	Kitt Peak	Spacewatch	NYS	1.4 km	MPC · JPL
199841	2007 EC_{47}	—	March 9, 2007	Kitt Peak	Spacewatch	NYS	1.6 km	MPC · JPL
199842	2007 EE_{47}	—	March 9, 2007	Kitt Peak	Spacewatch	·	890 m	MPC · JPL
199843	2007 EX_{53}	—	March 11, 2007	Mount Lemmon	Mount Lemmon Survey	·	2.7 km	MPC · JPL
199844	2007 EX_{63}	—	March 10, 2007	Kitt Peak	Spacewatch	·	930 m	MPC · JPL
199845	2007 EN_{71}	—	March 10, 2007	Kitt Peak	Spacewatch	·	1.7 km	MPC · JPL
199846	2007 EY_{71}	—	March 10, 2007	Kitt Peak	Spacewatch	·	1.2 km	MPC · JPL
199847	2007 EJ_{75}	—	March 10, 2007	Kitt Peak	Spacewatch	V	1.1 km	MPC · JPL
199848	2007 EK_{75}	—	March 10, 2007	Kitt Peak	Spacewatch	·	2.9 km	MPC · JPL
199849	2007 EB_{76}	—	March 10, 2007	Kitt Peak	Spacewatch	MAS	950 m	MPC · JPL
199850	2007 EC_{79}	—	March 10, 2007	Kitt Peak	Spacewatch	NYS	1.9 km	MPC · JPL
199851	2007 ER_{79}	—	March 10, 2007	Kitt Peak	Spacewatch	·	2.0 km	MPC · JPL
199852	2007 EB_{80}	—	March 10, 2007	Palomar	NEAT	(194)	2.4 km	MPC · JPL
199853	2007 EP_{83}	—	March 12, 2007	Kitt Peak	Spacewatch	·	1.4 km	MPC · JPL
199854	2007 EL_{86}	—	March 13, 2007	Kitt Peak	Spacewatch	·	3.0 km	MPC · JPL
199855	2007 EO_{87}	—	March 13, 2007	Mount Lemmon	Mount Lemmon Survey	H	800 m	MPC · JPL
199856	2007 ER_{91}	—	March 10, 2007	Kitt Peak	Spacewatch	MAS	1.0 km	MPC · JPL
199857	2007 EC_{97}	—	March 10, 2007	Mount Lemmon	Mount Lemmon Survey	·	3.9 km	MPC · JPL
199858	2007 EW_{97}	—	March 11, 2007	Catalina	CSS	H	820 m	MPC · JPL
199859	2007 EB_{101}	—	March 11, 2007	Kitt Peak	Spacewatch	CLA	2.4 km	MPC · JPL
199860	2007 EP_{113}	—	March 12, 2007	Kitt Peak	Spacewatch	·	1.1 km	MPC · JPL
199861	2007 EG_{117}	—	March 13, 2007	Mount Lemmon	Mount Lemmon Survey	·	2.3 km	MPC · JPL
199862	2007 EY_{118}	—	March 13, 2007	Mount Lemmon	Mount Lemmon Survey	·	2.2 km	MPC · JPL
199863	2007 EM_{119}	—	March 13, 2007	Mount Lemmon	Mount Lemmon Survey	·	2.1 km	MPC · JPL
199864	2007 EN_{119}	—	March 13, 2007	Mount Lemmon	Mount Lemmon Survey	V	1.1 km	MPC · JPL
199865	2007 ED_{133}	—	March 9, 2007	Mount Lemmon	Mount Lemmon Survey	·	960 m	MPC · JPL
199866	2007 EQ_{135}	—	March 10, 2007	Mount Lemmon	Mount Lemmon Survey	·	750 m	MPC · JPL
199867	2007 ES_{141}	—	March 12, 2007	Kitt Peak	Spacewatch	(2076)	810 m	MPC · JPL
199868	2007 EF_{145}	—	March 12, 2007	Mount Lemmon	Mount Lemmon Survey	·	960 m	MPC · JPL
199869	2007 EN_{165}	—	March 15, 2007	Kitt Peak	Spacewatch	V	960 m	MPC · JPL
199870	2007 EP_{165}	—	March 15, 2007	Mount Lemmon	Mount Lemmon Survey	H	710 m	MPC · JPL
199871	2007 EG_{166}	—	March 10, 2007	Mount Lemmon	Mount Lemmon Survey	·	1.4 km	MPC · JPL
199872	2007 EP_{169}	—	March 13, 2007	Kitt Peak	Spacewatch	·	2.5 km	MPC · JPL
199873	2007 EQ_{169}	—	March 13, 2007	Kitt Peak	Spacewatch	·	1.3 km	MPC · JPL
199874	2007 ER_{171}	—	March 11, 2007	Mount Lemmon	Mount Lemmon Survey	·	850 m	MPC · JPL
199875	2007 EB_{196}	—	March 15, 2007	Catalina	CSS	H	820 m	MPC · JPL
199876	2007 EE_{198}	—	March 15, 2007	Mount Lemmon	Mount Lemmon Survey	·	2.0 km	MPC · JPL
199877	2007 ES_{199}	—	March 9, 2007	Kitt Peak	Spacewatch	MAS	1.1 km	MPC · JPL
199878	2007 EV_{202}	—	March 9, 2007	Kitt Peak	Spacewatch	·	4.0 km	MPC · JPL
199879	2007 EJ_{213}	—	March 9, 2007	Mount Lemmon	Mount Lemmon Survey	NYS	1.9 km	MPC · JPL
199880	2007 EP_{213}	—	March 9, 2007	Kitt Peak	Spacewatch	·	1.9 km	MPC · JPL
199881	2007 ER_{213}	—	March 9, 2007	Kitt Peak	Spacewatch	·	1.2 km	MPC · JPL
199882	2007 EZ_{213}	—	March 11, 2007	Mount Lemmon	Mount Lemmon Survey	V	790 m	MPC · JPL
199883	2007 ES_{214}	—	March 15, 2007	Kitt Peak	Spacewatch	·	1.3 km	MPC · JPL
199884	2007 EP_{218}	—	March 10, 2007	Kitt Peak	Spacewatch	·	2.2 km	MPC · JPL
199885	2007 ED_{220}	—	March 13, 2007	Mount Lemmon	Mount Lemmon Survey	·	1.0 km	MPC · JPL
199886	2007 FH	—	March 16, 2007	Socorro	LINEAR	ERI	2.4 km	MPC · JPL
199887	2007 FF_{10}	—	March 16, 2007	Kitt Peak	Spacewatch	·	1.5 km	MPC · JPL
199888	2007 FW_{11}	—	March 17, 2007	Kitt Peak	Spacewatch	·	1.2 km	MPC · JPL
199889	2007 FM_{19}	—	March 20, 2007	Mount Lemmon	Mount Lemmon Survey	EUN	1.2 km	MPC · JPL
199890	2007 FT_{30}	—	March 20, 2007	Mount Lemmon	Mount Lemmon Survey	·	1.5 km	MPC · JPL
199891	2007 FG_{34}	—	March 25, 2007	Mount Lemmon	Mount Lemmon Survey	·	1.5 km	MPC · JPL
199892	2007 FO_{35}	—	March 20, 2007	Catalina	CSS	H	930 m	MPC · JPL
199893	2007 FC_{37}	—	March 26, 2007	Mount Lemmon	Mount Lemmon Survey	·	1.7 km	MPC · JPL
199894	2007 FO_{37}	—	March 26, 2007	Mount Lemmon	Mount Lemmon Survey	·	2.3 km	MPC · JPL
199895	2007 FK_{38}	—	March 29, 2007	Palomar	NEAT	·	1.8 km	MPC · JPL
199896	2007 FB_{39}	—	March 28, 2007	Siding Spring	SSS	JUN	1.5 km	MPC · JPL
199897	2007 FO_{41}	—	March 26, 2007	Mount Lemmon	Mount Lemmon Survey	·	1.3 km	MPC · JPL
199898	2007 FD_{42}	—	March 26, 2007	Mount Lemmon	Mount Lemmon Survey	·	1.1 km	MPC · JPL
199899	2007 GV	—	April 6, 2007	Palomar	NEAT	·	4.4 km	MPC · JPL
199900 Brunoganz	2007 GA_{1}	Brunoganz	April 8, 2007	Vallemare di Borbona	V. S. Casulli	·	2.9 km	MPC · JPL

== 199901–200000 ==
back to top

Designation			Discovery			Properties		Ref
Permanent	Provisional	Named after	Date	Site	Discoverer(s)	Category	Diam.	Ref
199901	2007 GG_{5}	—	April 12, 2007	Bergisch Gladbach	W. Bickel	·	1.9 km	MPC · JPL
199902	2007 GC_{9}	—	April 7, 2007	Catalina	CSS	NYS	1.6 km	MPC · JPL
199903	2007 GO_{14}	—	April 11, 2007	Kitt Peak	Spacewatch	·	3.3 km	MPC · JPL
199904	2007 GW_{14}	—	April 11, 2007	Catalina	CSS	·	4.0 km	MPC · JPL
199905	2007 GN_{16}	—	April 11, 2007	Kitt Peak	Spacewatch	V	940 m	MPC · JPL
199906	2007 GS_{16}	—	April 11, 2007	Kitt Peak	Spacewatch	EUN	1.4 km	MPC · JPL
199907	2007 GB_{17}	—	April 11, 2007	Kitt Peak	Spacewatch	·	1.9 km	MPC · JPL
199908	2007 GK_{17}	—	April 11, 2007	Kitt Peak	Spacewatch	·	1.4 km	MPC · JPL
199909	2007 GY_{18}	—	April 11, 2007	Kitt Peak	Spacewatch	NYS	1.9 km	MPC · JPL
199910	2007 GM_{19}	—	April 11, 2007	Kitt Peak	Spacewatch	MAS	770 m	MPC · JPL
199911	2007 GH_{20}	—	April 11, 2007	Kitt Peak	Spacewatch	·	3.7 km	MPC · JPL
199912	2007 GO_{21}	—	April 11, 2007	Mount Lemmon	Mount Lemmon Survey	THM	3.1 km	MPC · JPL
199913	2007 GO_{22}	—	April 11, 2007	Mount Lemmon	Mount Lemmon Survey	NYS	1.6 km	MPC · JPL
199914	2007 GW_{22}	—	April 11, 2007	Mount Lemmon	Mount Lemmon Survey	·	1.9 km	MPC · JPL
199915	2007 GC_{23}	—	April 11, 2007	Mount Lemmon	Mount Lemmon Survey	·	2.4 km	MPC · JPL
199916	2007 GN_{23}	—	April 11, 2007	Kitt Peak	Spacewatch	MAS	1.0 km	MPC · JPL
199917	2007 GL_{26}	—	April 14, 2007	Kitt Peak	Spacewatch	·	1.4 km	MPC · JPL
199918	2007 GO_{26}	—	April 14, 2007	Kitt Peak	Spacewatch	·	1.2 km	MPC · JPL
199919	2007 GJ_{27}	—	April 14, 2007	Kitt Peak	Spacewatch	HOF	4.7 km	MPC · JPL
199920	2007 GC_{28}	—	April 15, 2007	Kitt Peak	Spacewatch	·	2.8 km	MPC · JPL
199921	2007 GS_{29}	—	April 12, 2007	Siding Spring	SSS	·	2.4 km	MPC · JPL
199922	2007 GX_{31}	—	April 11, 2007	Siding Spring	SSS	·	3.0 km	MPC · JPL
199923	2007 GU_{33}	—	April 11, 2007	Mount Lemmon	Mount Lemmon Survey	·	2.1 km	MPC · JPL
199924	2007 GC_{34}	—	April 13, 2007	Siding Spring	SSS	·	1.4 km	MPC · JPL
199925	2007 GZ_{35}	—	April 14, 2007	Kitt Peak	Spacewatch	V	800 m	MPC · JPL
199926	2007 GG_{36}	—	April 14, 2007	Kitt Peak	Spacewatch	·	920 m	MPC · JPL
199927	2007 GO_{36}	—	April 14, 2007	Kitt Peak	Spacewatch	BRG	2.0 km	MPC · JPL
199928	2007 GB_{37}	—	April 14, 2007	Kitt Peak	Spacewatch	·	4.2 km	MPC · JPL
199929	2007 GG_{37}	—	April 14, 2007	Kitt Peak	Spacewatch	V	710 m	MPC · JPL
199930	2007 GA_{39}	—	April 14, 2007	Kitt Peak	Spacewatch	MIS	3.4 km	MPC · JPL
199931	2007 GJ_{40}	—	April 14, 2007	Kitt Peak	Spacewatch	KOR	1.6 km	MPC · JPL
199932	2007 GL_{40}	—	April 14, 2007	Kitt Peak	Spacewatch	·	1.7 km	MPC · JPL
199933	2007 GV_{40}	—	April 14, 2007	Kitt Peak	Spacewatch	·	1.4 km	MPC · JPL
199934	2007 GR_{45}	—	April 14, 2007	Kitt Peak	Spacewatch	·	1.4 km	MPC · JPL
199935	2007 GB_{48}	—	April 14, 2007	Kitt Peak	Spacewatch	THM	3.1 km	MPC · JPL
199936	2007 GO_{49}	—	April 15, 2007	Kitt Peak	Spacewatch	·	3.1 km	MPC · JPL
199937	2007 GU_{49}	—	April 15, 2007	Socorro	LINEAR	H	980 m	MPC · JPL
199938	2007 GD_{51}	—	April 15, 2007	Kitt Peak	Spacewatch	V	830 m	MPC · JPL
199939	2007 GU_{51}	—	April 15, 2007	Kitt Peak	Spacewatch	HYG	3.8 km	MPC · JPL
199940	2007 GD_{59}	—	April 15, 2007	Kitt Peak	Spacewatch	·	1.0 km	MPC · JPL
199941	2007 GD_{61}	—	April 15, 2007	Kitt Peak	Spacewatch	·	1.1 km	MPC · JPL
199942	2007 GQ_{65}	—	April 15, 2007	Kitt Peak	Spacewatch	·	960 m	MPC · JPL
199943	2007 GO_{67}	—	April 15, 2007	Kitt Peak	Spacewatch	·	2.4 km	MPC · JPL
199944	2007 GM_{73}	—	April 15, 2007	Catalina	CSS	·	1.1 km	MPC · JPL
199945	2007 GC_{75}	—	April 14, 2007	Kitt Peak	Spacewatch	·	3.4 km	MPC · JPL
199946	2007 HE_{2}	—	April 16, 2007	Mount Lemmon	Mount Lemmon Survey	·	1.3 km	MPC · JPL
199947 Qaidam	2007 HR_{7}	Qaidam	April 16, 2007	XuYi	PMO NEO Survey Program	·	3.4 km	MPC · JPL
199948	2007 HK_{9}	—	April 18, 2007	Kitt Peak	Spacewatch	KOR	1.8 km	MPC · JPL
199949	2007 HR_{15}	—	April 21, 2007	Pises	Pises	·	3.0 km	MPC · JPL
199950 Sierpc	2007 HK_{16}	Sierpc	April 16, 2007	Antares	Astronomical Research Observatory	·	2.3 km	MPC · JPL
199951	2007 HE_{24}	—	April 18, 2007	Socorro	LINEAR	·	2.2 km	MPC · JPL
199952	2007 HZ_{25}	—	April 18, 2007	Kitt Peak	Spacewatch	·	1.6 km	MPC · JPL
199953 Mingnaiben	2007 HK_{28}	Mingnaiben	April 18, 2007	XuYi	PMO NEO Survey Program	·	2.1 km	MPC · JPL
199954	2007 HP_{28}	—	April 19, 2007	Mount Lemmon	Mount Lemmon Survey	JUN	980 m	MPC · JPL
199955	2007 HD_{30}	—	April 19, 2007	Mount Lemmon	Mount Lemmon Survey	·	2.1 km	MPC · JPL
199956	2007 HK_{35}	—	April 19, 2007	Kitt Peak	Spacewatch	·	1.6 km	MPC · JPL
199957	2007 HA_{38}	—	April 20, 2007	Kitt Peak	Spacewatch	·	1.8 km	MPC · JPL
199958	2007 HT_{41}	—	April 20, 2007	Kitt Peak	Spacewatch	·	2.8 km	MPC · JPL
199959	2007 HJ_{44}	—	April 23, 2007	Tiki	S. F. Hönig, Teamo, N.	·	2.9 km	MPC · JPL
199960	2007 HZ_{47}	—	April 20, 2007	Kitt Peak	Spacewatch	·	1.6 km	MPC · JPL
199961	2007 HF_{48}	—	April 20, 2007	Kitt Peak	Spacewatch	·	1.0 km	MPC · JPL
199962	2007 HB_{50}	—	April 20, 2007	Kitt Peak	Spacewatch	·	1.4 km	MPC · JPL
199963	2007 HD_{52}	—	April 20, 2007	Kitt Peak	Spacewatch	EOS	3.3 km	MPC · JPL
199964	2007 HQ_{53}	—	April 20, 2007	Lulin Observatory	LUSS	·	1.2 km	MPC · JPL
199965	2007 HG_{65}	—	April 22, 2007	Catalina	CSS	PHO	1.7 km	MPC · JPL
199966	2007 HL_{65}	—	April 22, 2007	Catalina	CSS	·	2.6 km	MPC · JPL
199967	2007 HG_{67}	—	April 23, 2007	Kitt Peak	Spacewatch	·	1.3 km	MPC · JPL
199968	2007 HE_{68}	—	April 23, 2007	Kitt Peak	Spacewatch	·	1.6 km	MPC · JPL
199969	2007 HV_{72}	—	April 22, 2007	Kitt Peak	Spacewatch	THM	2.7 km	MPC · JPL
199970	2007 HE_{75}	—	April 22, 2007	Kitt Peak	Spacewatch	THM	2.6 km	MPC · JPL
199971	2007 HA_{76}	—	April 22, 2007	Kitt Peak	Spacewatch	·	1.4 km	MPC · JPL
199972	2007 HC_{84}	—	April 27, 2007	Kitt Peak	Spacewatch	H	860 m	MPC · JPL
199973	2007 HX_{85}	—	April 24, 2007	Kitt Peak	Spacewatch	KON	3.6 km	MPC · JPL
199974	2007 HY_{89}	—	April 19, 2007	Mount Lemmon	Mount Lemmon Survey	·	900 m	MPC · JPL
199975	2007 HG_{90}	—	April 20, 2007	Kitt Peak	Spacewatch	EUN	1.5 km	MPC · JPL
199976	2007 JR	—	May 7, 2007	Mount Lemmon	Mount Lemmon Survey	·	2.6 km	MPC · JPL
199977	2007 JB_{1}	—	May 7, 2007	Kitt Peak	Spacewatch	·	1.2 km	MPC · JPL
199978	2007 JZ_{1}	—	May 7, 2007	Catalina	CSS	·	3.3 km	MPC · JPL
199979	2007 JS_{4}	—	May 7, 2007	Catalina	CSS	·	3.8 km	MPC · JPL
199980	2007 JN_{5}	—	May 9, 2007	Mount Lemmon	Mount Lemmon Survey	·	1.5 km	MPC · JPL
199981	2007 JQ_{12}	—	May 7, 2007	Catalina	CSS	·	4.6 km	MPC · JPL
199982	2007 JG_{13}	—	May 8, 2007	Anderson Mesa	LONEOS	·	1.9 km	MPC · JPL
199983	2007 JJ_{13}	—	May 8, 2007	Lulin Observatory	LUSS	EUN	1.9 km	MPC · JPL
199984	2007 JP_{16}	—	May 7, 2007	Kitt Peak	Spacewatch	V	900 m	MPC · JPL
199985	2007 JG_{17}	—	May 7, 2007	Kitt Peak	Spacewatch	·	1.5 km	MPC · JPL
199986 Chervone	2007 JD_{21}	Chervone	May 9, 2007	Andrushivka	Andrushivka	·	4.1 km	MPC · JPL
199987	2007 JL_{21}	—	May 12, 2007	Tiki	S. F. Hönig, Teamo, N.	LIX	4.7 km	MPC · JPL
199988	2007 JM_{21}	—	May 12, 2007	Tiki	S. F. Hönig, Teamo, N.	·	2.7 km	MPC · JPL
199989	2007 JK_{23}	—	May 7, 2007	Catalina	CSS	RAF	1.9 km	MPC · JPL
199990	2007 JT_{23}	—	May 8, 2007	Anderson Mesa	LONEOS	·	1.6 km	MPC · JPL
199991 Adriencoffinet	2007 JX_{24}	Adriencoffinet	May 9, 2007	Mount Lemmon	Mount Lemmon Survey	·	1.3 km	MPC · JPL
199992	2007 JW_{25}	—	May 9, 2007	Kitt Peak	Spacewatch	·	2.4 km	MPC · JPL
199993	2007 JP_{27}	—	May 9, 2007	Kitt Peak	Spacewatch	·	3.6 km	MPC · JPL
199994	2007 JJ_{29}	—	May 10, 2007	Mount Lemmon	Mount Lemmon Survey	·	2.2 km	MPC · JPL
199995	2007 JV_{33}	—	May 12, 2007	Mount Lemmon	Mount Lemmon Survey	·	3.0 km	MPC · JPL
199996	2007 JA_{34}	—	May 9, 2007	Mount Lemmon	Mount Lemmon Survey	·	1.9 km	MPC · JPL
199997	2007 JB_{36}	—	May 11, 2007	Catalina	CSS	BAR	2.5 km	MPC · JPL
199998	2007 JU_{39}	—	May 11, 2007	Siding Spring	SSS	·	2.2 km	MPC · JPL
199999 Nickgrossman	2007 JZ_{39}	Nickgrossman	May 12, 2007	Mount Lemmon	Mount Lemmon Survey	·	2.7 km	MPC · JPL
200000 Danielparrott	2007 JT_{40}	Danielparrott	May 12, 2007	Mount Lemmon	Mount Lemmon Survey	·	3.2 km	MPC · JPL

back to top

== See also ==
- Meanings of minor-planet names: 199001–200000
