= Feng Duan =

Chinese physicist (1923–2020)

- Born: June 11, 1923; Suzhou, Jiangsu, China
- Died: December 15, 2020 (aged 97); Nanjing, Jiangsu, China
- Education: National Central University
- Spouse: Chen Lianfang
- Scientific career
- Fields: Solid-state physics
- Workplaces: Nanjing University
- Notable students: Xiang Zhang; Min Naiben

Chinese name
- Traditional Chinese: 馮端
- Simplified Chinese: 冯端
Transcriptions
Standard Mandarin
- Hanyu Pinyin: Féng Duān

Feng Duan (Chinese: 冯端; 11 June 1923 – 15 December 2020) was a physicist of China, an expert in solid-state physics. He was a member of the Chinese Academy of Sciences. He was a delegate to the 6th, 7th and 8th National People's Congress.

== Etymology ==
Because he was born before the Dragon Boat Festival (端午节; Duān Wǔ Jié), so his father named him "Duan".

== Biography ==
Feng was born in Suzhou, Jiangsu, though his ancestral hometown is Shaoxing, Zhejiang. His father Feng Zupei (冯祖培) was an official in the Nationalist government. Feng has two elder brothers. All of them were alumni of National Central University. The eldest, Feng Huan went to United States in 1947, and served in GE R&D center as a senior engineer. His second elder brother, Feng Kang, was a prominent Chinese mathematician, and also a member of CAS. His elder sister Feng Hui (冯慧) was a researcher at the Institute of Zoology, Chinese Academy of Sciences. His brother-in-law Ye Duzheng was a meteorologist and a member of CAS. In 1942, after graduating from Suzhou High School, Feng entered National Central University (renamed Nanjing University after 1949), studying physics. He graduated in 1946 and stayed at the University, serving as a teaching assistant in physics department. Later, he became a lecturer, an associate professor, and eventually attained the title of professor. Feng was the president of graduate school of Nanjing University, and the director of state key laboratory of solid-state micro-structure physics. He used to serve as president of China Physics Society, first scientist of "Nano Material Science", a "climbing project" of National Commission of Science and Technology, and the chairman of Jiangsu Science and Technology Association. Feng was elected to member of Chinese Academy of Sciences (CAS) in 1980.

Feng was the chairman of alumni association of National Central University.

Feng died on December 15, 2020, in Nanjing, Jiangsu, aged 97.

== Personal life ==
Feng married Chen Lianfang (陈廉方) in Nanjing on April 1, 1955. Chen was a high school Chinese teacher and graduated from department of foreign language of National Central University in 1945.

== Honours and awards ==
- 1980 Member of the Chinese Academy of Sciences (CAS)
- 1993 member of The World Academy of Sciences (TWAS)
