= Zerodur =

Extremely durable glass-ceramic

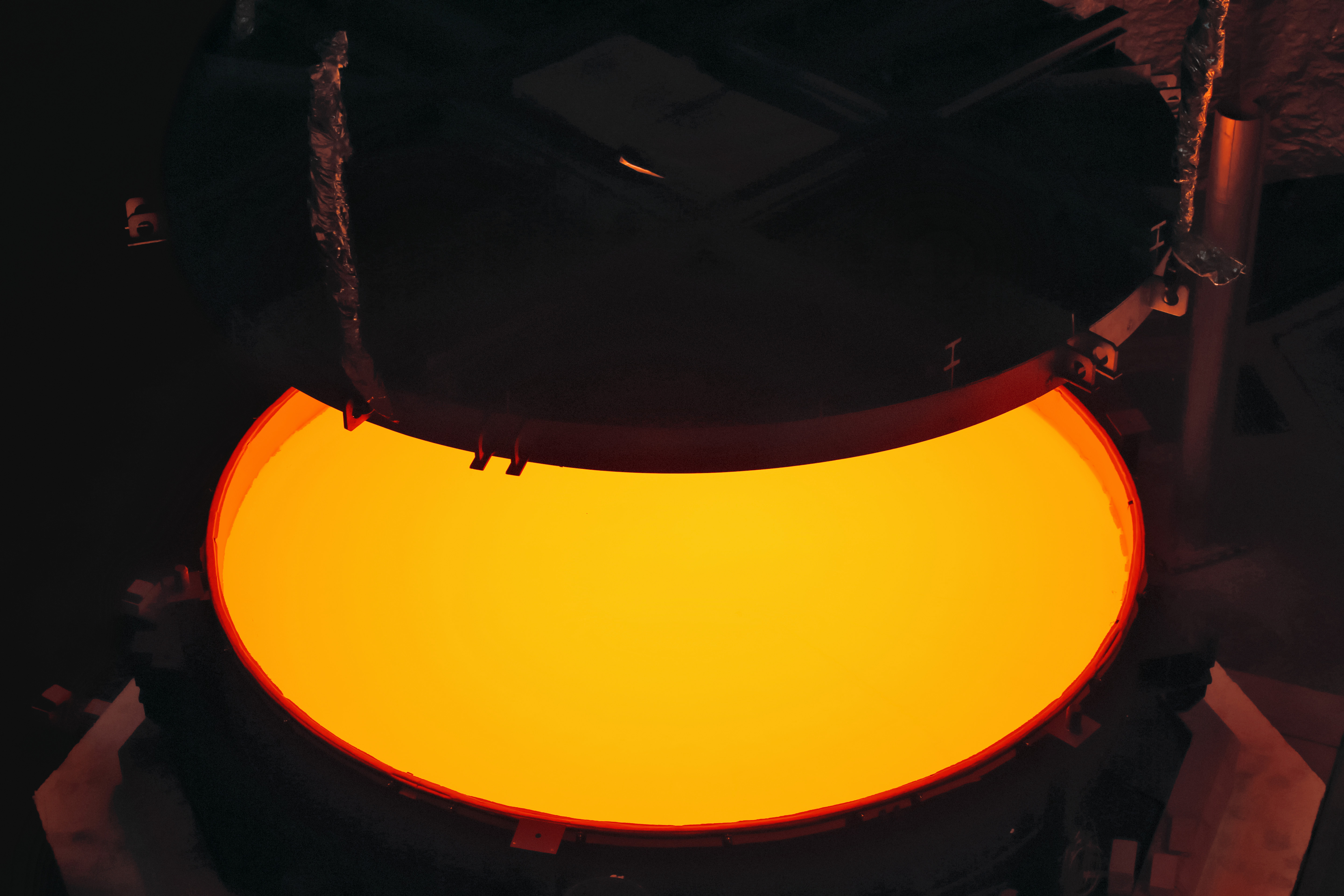
Opening of the ELT secondary mirror Zerodur blank mold containing the glass at first annealing at the Schott AG 4-meter blank annealing facility in Mainz, Germany.

Zerodur is a lithium-aluminosilicate glass-ceramic manufactured by Schott AG. Zerodur has a near zero coefficient of thermal expansion (CTE), and is used for high-precision applications in telescope optics, microlithography machines and inertial navigation systems.

== Manufacturing process ==
Zerodur is produced in a two-step process involving melting and ceramization. Depending on the size of the blanks, each step can take several months.

First, raw materials including main components of lithium oxide (Li_{2}O), alumina (Al_{2}O_{3}), and silica (SiO_{2}) are melted at high temperatures of around 1600 °C, poured into molds, and annealed in a controlled cooling process that relieves internal stresses that develop during forming. Then the glass undergoes a ceramization process involving controlled volume crystallization, which creates high-quartz nano-crystallites of 30 nm to 50 nm. The negative CTE of the crystals compensates for the positive CTE of the residual glass matrix, which gives Zerodur its near zero thermal expansion.

== Applications ==
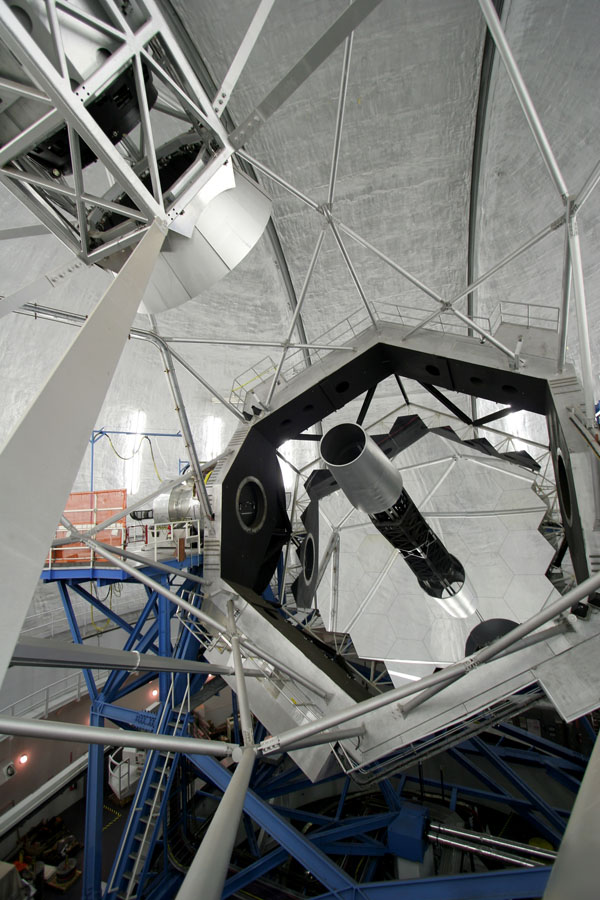
The Keck II Telescope showing the segmented primary mirror made of Zerodur

The main applications for Zerodur include telescope optics in astronomy and space applications, lithography machines for microchips and displays, and inertial measurements systems for navigation.

In astronomy, it is used for mirror substrates in large telescopes such as the Hobby-Eberly Telescope, the Keck I and Keck II telescopes, the Gran Telescopio Canarias, the Devasthal Optical Telescope, the European Southern Observatory's 8.2 m Very Large Telescope, and the 39 m Extremely Large Telescope. It also has been used for the primary mirror of SOFIA's airborne telescope.

ASA (AstroSysteme Austria) also produces some telescopes with Zerodur.

In space, it has been used for the imager in Meteosat Earth observation satellites, and for the optical bench in the LISA Pathfinder mission.

In microlithography, Zerodur is used in wafer steppers and scanner machines for precise and reproducible wafer positioning. It is also used as a component in refractive optics for photolithography.

In inertial measurement units, Zerodur is used in ring laser gyroscopes.

== Properties ==
Zerodur has both an amorphous (vitreous) component and a crystalline component. Its most important properties are:

- The material exhibits a particularly low thermal expansion, with a mean value of 0 ± 0.007×10^{−6} K^{−1} within the temperature range of 0 to 50 °C.
- High 3D homogeneity with few inclusions, bubbles and internal stria.
- Hardness similar to that of borosilicate glass.
- High affinity for coatings.
- Low helium permeability.
- Non-porous.
- Good chemical stability.
- Fracture toughness approximately 0.9 MPa·m^{1/2}.

=== Physical properties ===
- Dispersion: (n_{F} − n_{C}) = 0.00967
- Density: 2.53 g/cm^{3} at 25 °C
- Young's modulus: 9.1×10^{10} Pa
- Poisson ratio: 0.24
- Specific heat capacity at 25 °C: 0.196 cal/(g·K) = 0.82 J/(g·K)
- Coefficient of thermal expansion (20 °C to 300 °C) : 0.05 ± 0.10×10^{−6}/K
- Thermal conductivity: at 20 °C: 1.46 W/(m·K)
- Maximum application temperature: 600 °C
- Impact resistance behavior is substantially similar to other glass

== History ==
Schott began developing glass-ceramics in the 1960s led by Jürgen Petzoldt, in response to demand for low expansion glass ceramics for telescopes.

In 1966, Hans Elsässer, the founding director of the Max Planck Institute for Astronomy (MPIA), asked the company if it could produce large castings of almost 4 meters using low-expansion glass-ceramic for telescope mirror substrates. In 1969, the MPIA ordered a 3.6 m (12 ft) mirror blank, along with ten smaller mirror substrates. The mirrors were delivered by late 1975, and went into operation in 1984 in a telescope at the Calar Alto Observatory in Spain. Further orders for mirror blanks followed.

== See also ==
- CorningWare
- Macor
- Ring laser gyroscope
- Sitall
