= Throne Hall of Dongola =

9th century, largely extant, building in northern Sudan

Dongola Throne Hall
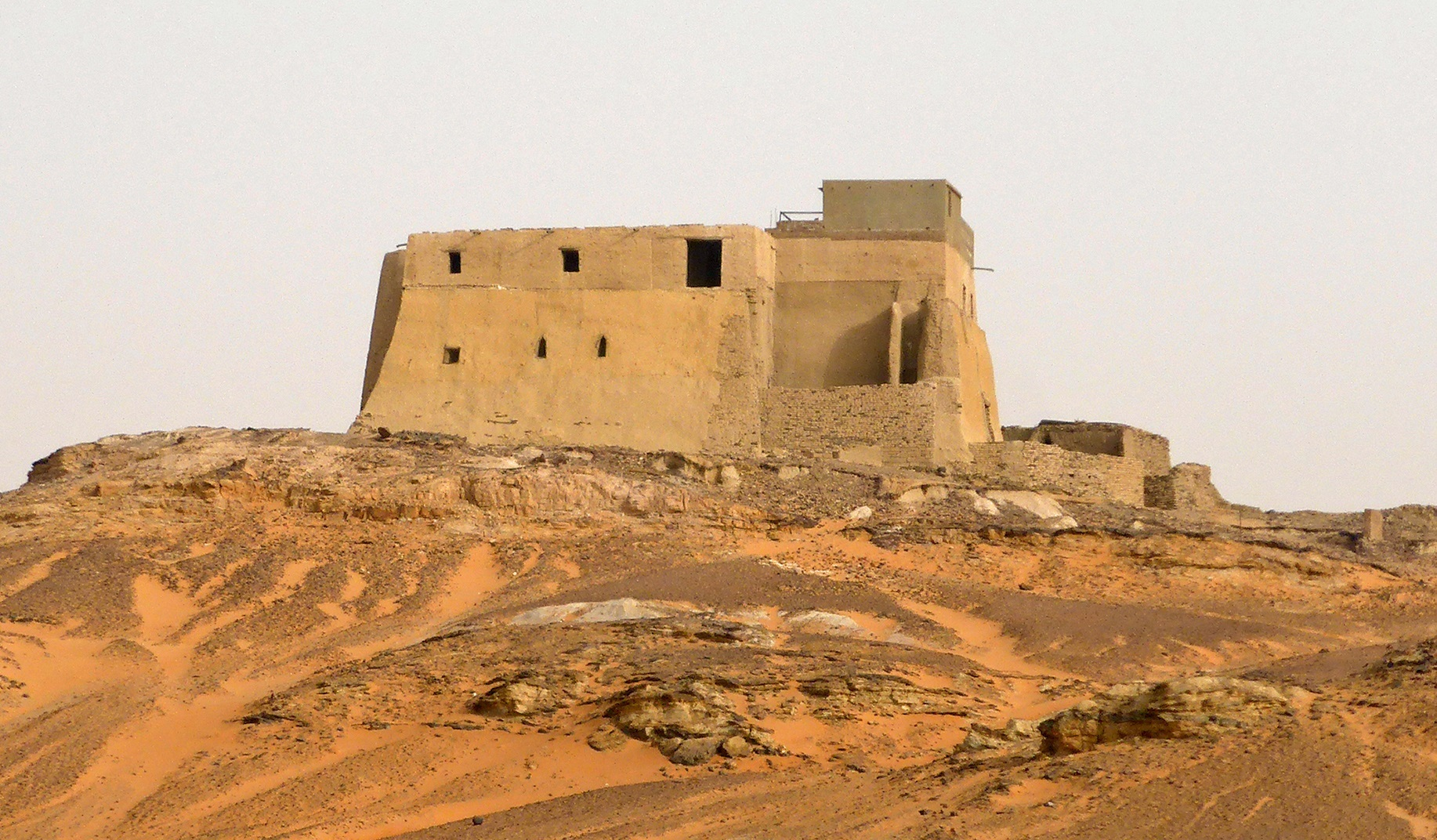
- The Throne Hall of Dongola from the north

- Location within Sudan

General information
- Architectural style: Nubian-Byzantine
- Location: Old Dongola, Sudan
- Coordinates: 18°13′29″N 30°44′44″E
- Completed: 9th century

Technical details
- Size: 12m (39ft) height, 28m (92ft) width, 18m (59ft) depth

The Throne Hall of Dongola, also known as the Mosque Building or Mosque of Abdallah ibn Abi Sarh, is an archaeological site in Old Dongola, Sudan. It is a two-storey brick building situated on a rocky hill, overlooking the town and the Nile valley. It was originally built in the 9th century, serving as the richly adorned representative building of the Makurian kings. In 1317, during the period of Makurian decline, it was converted into a mosque, serving this purpose until it was closed and turned into a historic monument in 1969. Shortly afterwards Polish archaeologists from the Polish Centre of Mediterranean Archaeology of the University of Warsaw began to excavate the building. It has been described as possibly "the most important, symbolic edifice in the medieval history of Sudan". It is presently the oldest preserved mosque in Sudan.

== History ==
=== Makurian Throne Hall (9th century–1317) ===
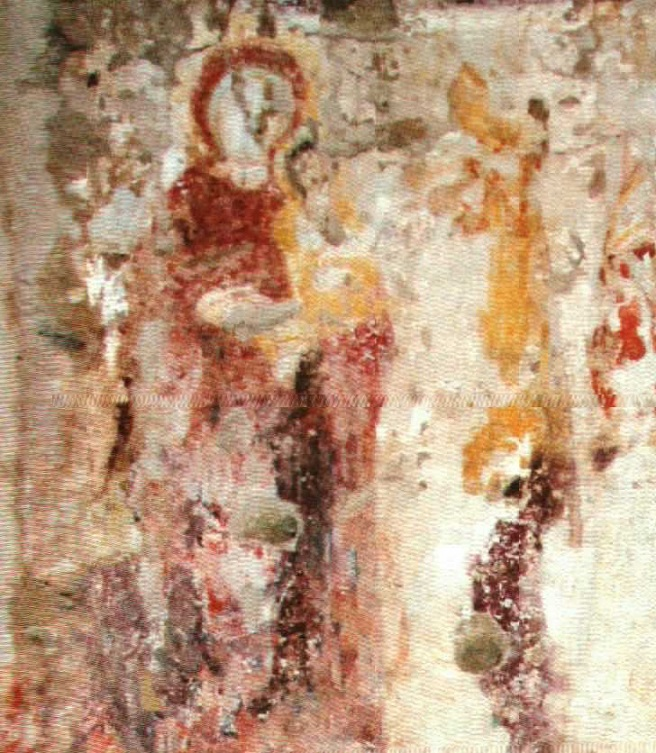
Worn painting from the central hall on the upper floor, showing Virgin Mary and the Christ Child. The latter is reaching out towards a date tree.

From the late 5th century Old Dongola (Old Nubian: Tungul) was to be the capital of the Nubian kingdom of Makuria, which converted to Christianity in the mid-6th century and successfully asserted its independence from the early Muslim conquests in the 7th century. The locals, now Muslim, associate the building with this period, calling it "mosque of Abdallah ibn Abi Sarh". Between the 9th and 11th centuries the town enjoyed a golden age. In the 9th century, several representative buildings were constructed, among them the Throne Hall. It was probably built in the first half of the century, during the reign of King Georgios I (r. 835–887) and his father Zacharias III (r. 835–857). (Note: Zakharias II had seized the throne in 835. In the same year he crowned his son Georgios I king before dispatching him on a diplomatic mission to Baghdad, probably to increase his prestige. After the death of Zakharias II in 857 his son became the sole ruler.) It was located on a rocky outcrop in the eastern part of the city. From this prominence the two-storey building enjoyed an extensive view of the town and the Nile. Its purpose has been interpreted differently over the years, ranging from church, monastery and royal castle. However, its internal design suggests that the building had an official, non-residential purpose, and that it was intended to impress visitors. The actual throne hall was on the upper floor, which official delegations and processions reached by ascending a monumental staircase. Both the throne hall and the staircase were adorned with wall paintings. During the 11th–12th centuries they were altered.

From 1265 Makuria endured repeated invasions by the Mamluk Sultanate, which, from 1276, usually installed a puppet king on the Makurian throne. At the end of the 13th century, after yet another confrontation with the Mamluks, the most prestigious buildings of Old Dongola, among them the Throne Hall, lay in ruins and the population had dropped drastically due to deportations. The Throne Hall in particular had both its south and northwest devastated. Shortly after the damage was inflicted, at the turn of the 13th century, the building was repaired, although not in its entirety and with various modifications.

=== Mosque (1317–1969) ===
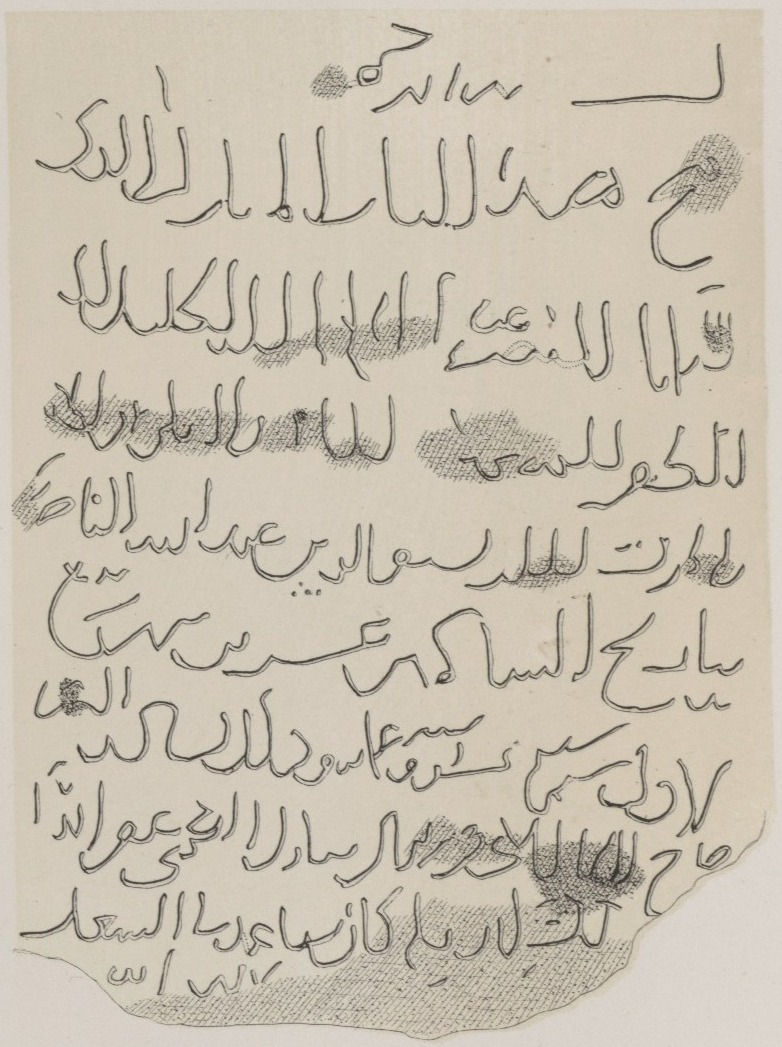
Drawing of the marble inscription commemorating the conversion into a mosque in 1317

In 1316, the Mamluks intervened into Makurian affairs once more, intending to install prince Abdallah Barshanbu on the throne. In contrast to the kings before him, he was a Muslim. On May 29, 1317 he converted the Throne Hall into a mosque, as is confirmed by a marble inscription. Alterations to the building, especially in the central hall on the upper floor, were made according to its new function, such as the inclusion of a mihrab and the application of plaster over the Christian wall paintings. Abdallah Barshanbu was not popular among his subjects due to his attitude and his reforms; Nubiologist Włodzimierz Godlewski postulates that the conversion of the Throne Hall might have played a part in his fall. Abdallah Barshanbu was eventually murdered by his own followers in the same year. After his death Makuria was ruled by both Muslim and Christian kings. None of them dared to restore the former function of the building, as the Mamluk sultans supported its new function.

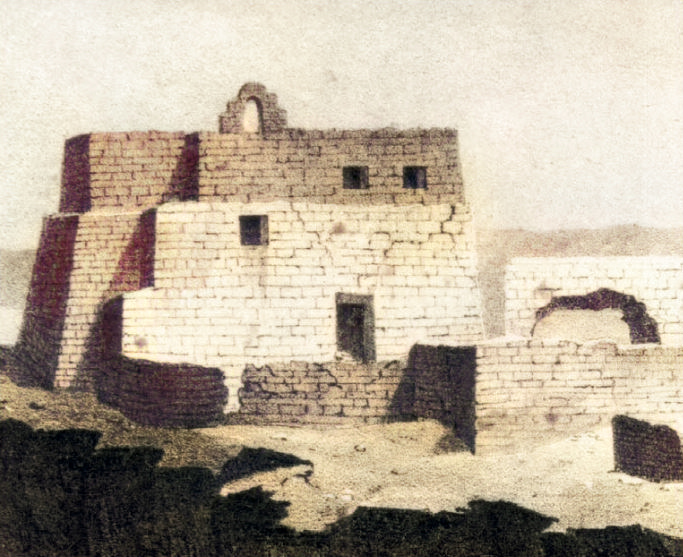
The mosque in 1821

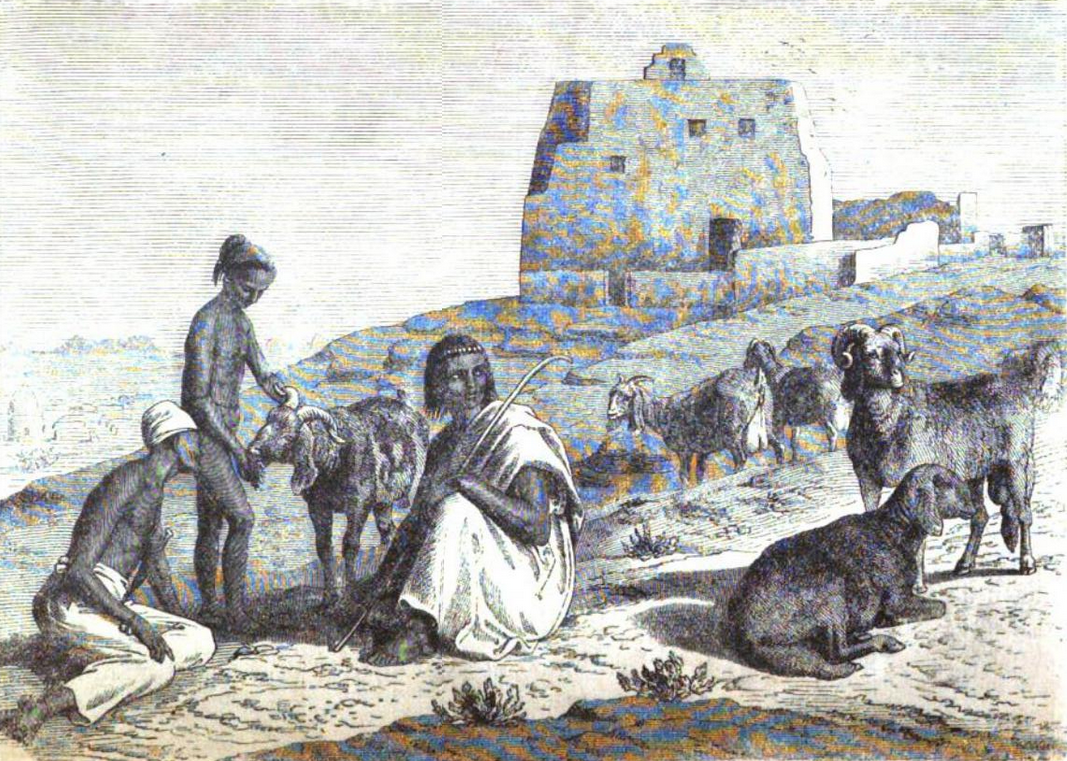
The building in 1868

A civil war caused the destruction of Old Dongola in 1365. The Makurian kings fled to Lower Nubia in the north, where they would maintain themselves for approximately 150 years. Old Dongola, abandoned by Makuria, came under the control of the Arabic Banu Ja'd tribe and eventually a new political entity, the so-called "Kingdom of Dongola Town", which was incorporated into the Funj sultanate during the early-16th century. The building is recorded to have served as a residence for Mecca pilgrims. However, during the 17th–19th centuries the ground floor was probably inaccessible. In the second half of the 18th century a local sheikh Sati Hamid Sawar is recorded to have renovated the mosque extensively.

From the early 19th century the building was repeatedly described by western travellers and researchers. In the late-19th century Old Dongola was abandoned, probably for economic reasons, but the mosque remained in use. In 1906 it was extensively documented for the first time. One year later it received another restoration by Ahmed Helmi, naib of the mamur of Debba; numerous others conducted by the Sudan Antiquities Service and various museums followed in the mid-20th century. It ceased operating as a place of worship in 1969, but it has been preserved and is presently the oldest preserved mosque in Sudan.

=== Historic site (1969–present) ===
After the salvage excavation of Faras Cathedral, Polish archaeologists turned their attention to Old Dongola, where they started digging from 1964. Between 1970 and 1983 they excavated the Throne Hall and documented its architecture and wall paintings.

It is intended that the Old Dongola site be transformed into an archaeological park. The construction of a steel roof is planned, providing protection and forming a stabilizing framework. After researching the wall paintings on the staircase and the main room on the first floor, ideas have emerged about the iconography and chronology. From 2018 to 2023 Old Dongola will be the subject of a large, multidisciplinary project researching the transformations that occurred between the 14th and early-19th centuries.

== Architecture ==
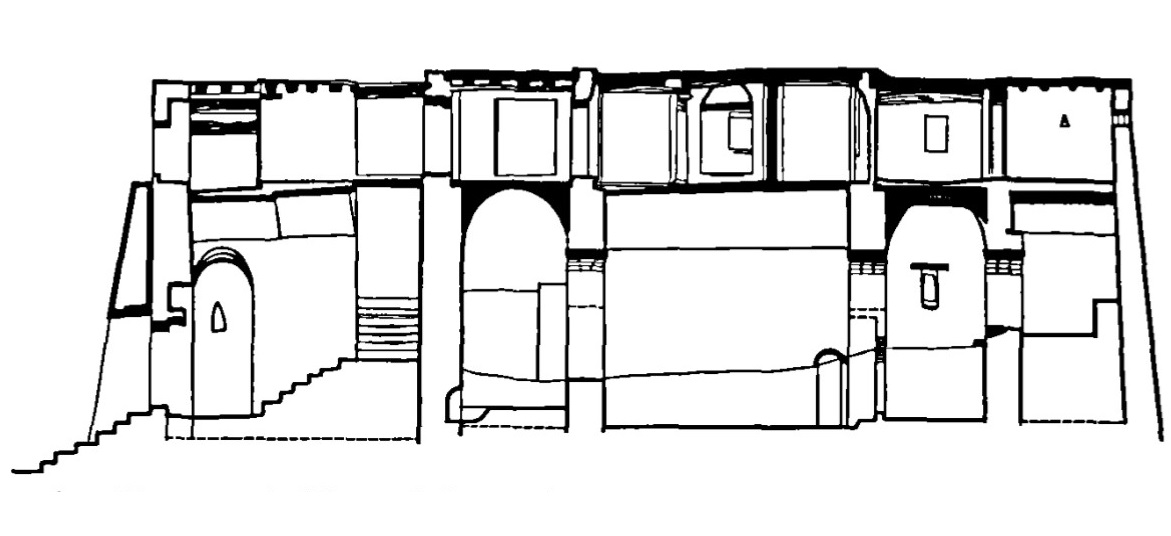
East-west section of the building

The Throne Hall was inspired by Byzantine architecture, providing a testament to the Makurian attachment to Byzantine culture. Very similar audience halls are known from the Bulgarian Empire, imitating, albeit on a smaller scale, those of Constantinople. The Throne Hall, measuring 12 metres (39 ft) in height, 28 metres (92 ft) in length and 18 metres (59 ft) in width, was built of mud bricks, red (fired) bricks and sandstone.

== Wall paintings ==
The wall paintings in the Throne Hall have suffered damage from rain water, termites and bats. They are located at the staircase and in the central hall and show influences by Byzantine models. The walls of the staircase had two layers of painted plaster, showing Archangel Michael wielding a spear, two warrior saints (one on foot and one on horseback) as well as several unidentifiable standing figures.

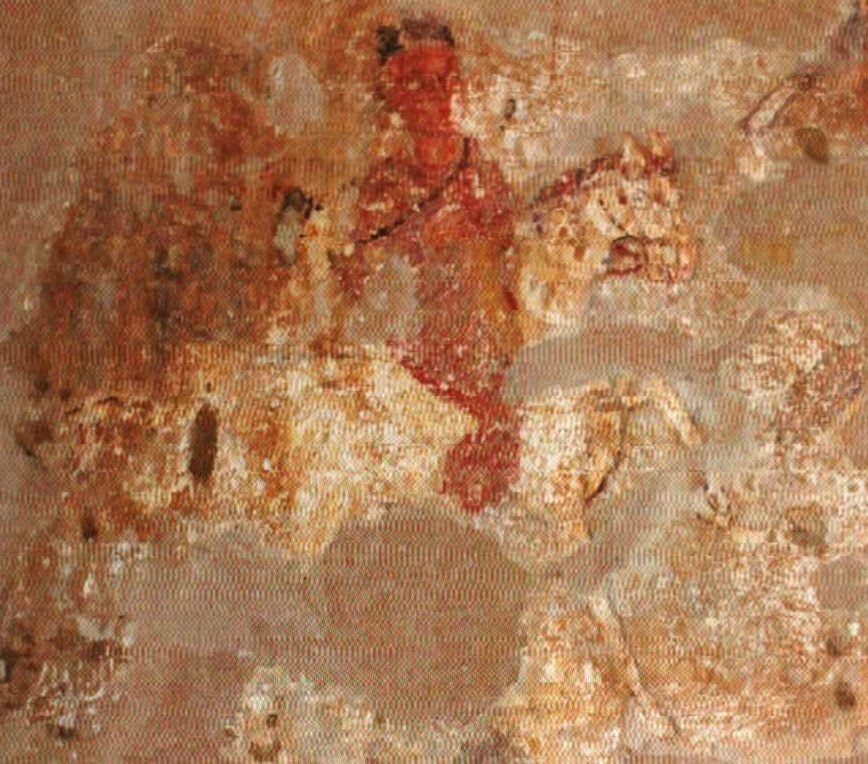
Detail of a painting from the central hall, showing a Magus on horseback

The central hall also had multiple layers of painted plaster, the amount varying from wall to wall. Its east wall housed a large nativity scene featuring the Virgin Mary lying on a mattress, a crib with the Christ Child, angels and, on the left side of the painting, the three Biblical Magi. The colour scheme is mostly limited to yellows, oranges, reds and violets. The eastern part of the south wall features a fragmentary depiction of Archangel Michael and the Holy Trinity, while the western part was divided into two scenes, one showing Mary holding the Christ Child, who reaches out for a palm tree. Again the colours are mostly limited to violet, yellow and red. The iconography of this last scene is unique in a Makurian context. The other scene from the western part of the south wall initially featured the Transfiguration, but was later painted over with the Holy Trinity and a (barely preserved) king wearing a horned crown. On the west wall a king with a scepter and a Byzantine crown, as well as two standing figures with halos, can be seen. The north wall features a large cross, a priest and a king, who wears a crown, a blue veil and a white robe. A later layer of painted plaster added the twenty-four elders from the Book of Revelation, depicted wearing white robes and wielding palm leaves, while sitting on thrones.

== See also ==
- Alodia
- Nobatia
- Islam in Sudan

== Notes ==
- CORDIS (31 October 2017). "Urban Metamorphosis of the community of a Medieval African capital city". CORDIS.
- Edwards, David (2004). The Nubian Past: An Archaeology of the Sudan. Routledge. ISBN 978-0-415-36987-9.
- Godlewski, Włodzimierz (2013). Dongola-ancient Tungul. Archaeological guide (PDF). Polish Centre of Mediterranean Archaeology, University of Warsaw. ISBN 978-83-903796-6-1.
- Hasan, Yusuf Fadl (1967). The Arabs and the Sudan. From the seventh to the early sixteenth century. University of Edinburgh. OCLC 33206034.
- Obłuski, Artur; Godlewski, Włodzimierz; Kołątaj, Wojciech; et al. (2013). "The Mosque Building in Old Dongola. Conservation and revitalization project" (PDF). Polish Archaeology in the Mediterranean. 22. Polish Centre of Mediterranean Archaeology, University of Warsaw: 248–272. ISSN 2083-537X.
- O'Fahey, R.S.; Spaulding, Jay L. (1974). Kingdoms of the Sudan. Methuen Young Books. ISBN 978-0416774504.
- Tarczewski, Romuald; Dziedzic, Teresa (2015). "Dongola Site Presentation Project: Progress in the 2013 Season". In Włodzimierz Godlewski; Dorota Dzierzbicka (eds.). Dongola 2012-2014. Fieldwork, conservation and site management. Polish Centre of Mediterranean Archaeology, University of Warsaw. pp. 325–331. ISBN 978-83-903796-8-5.
- Welsby, Derek (2002). The Medieval Kingdoms of Nubia. Pagans, Christians and Muslims Along the Middle Nile. British Museum. ISBN 978-0714119472.
- Werner, Roland (2013). Das Christentum in Nubien. Geschichte und Gestalt einer afrikanischen Kirche [Christianity in Nubia. History and shape of an African church] (in German). Lit. ISBN 978-3-643-12196-7.
- Zielinska, Dobrochna (2015). "Painted decoration of the Central Hall: preliminary inventory". In Włodzimierz Godlewski; Dorota Dzierzbicka (eds.). Dongola 2012-2014. Fieldwork, conservation and site management. Polish Centre of Mediterranean Archaeology, University of Warsaw. pp. 25–36. ISBN 978-83-903796-8-5.
