= Ilaria Pascucci =

Italian astronomer

- Education: University of Bologna, University of Jena, Max Planck Institute for Astronomy
- Known for: Research on exoplanets, protoplanets, formation of planets, protoplanetary disks
- Awards: American Astronomical Society (AAS) Fellow (2022)
- Scientific career
- Fields: Astrophysics, Planetary science
- Workplaces: Lunar and Planetary Laboratory, University of Arizona
- Thesis: (2004)
- Doctoral advisor: Thomas Henning

Ilaria Pascucci is an Italian-American astrophysicist and planetary scientist known for her research on exoplanets, protoplanets, the formation of planets, and protoplanetary disks, using a combination of theory, simulation, and observation. Pascucci is a professor and associate department head in the Lunar and Planetary Laboratory at the University of Arizona.

== Education and career ==
Pascucci earned a master's degree in astronomy, summa cum laude, from the University of Bologna in 1999, working there with Giorgio Palumbo, Malcolm Walmsley, and Paola Caselli. After graduate study at the University of Jena, she became a doctoral fellow of the Max Planck Society, and completed her Ph.D. in 2004 at the Max Planck Institute for Astronomy under the supervision of Thomas Henning.

After postdoctoral research at the University of Arizona from 2004 to 2008, she became a research scientist at Johns Hopkins University from 2008 to 2011, and a staff astronomer at the Space Telescope Science Institute from 2009 to 2011. In 2011, she took a faculty position as an assistant professor in the Lunar and Planetary Laboratory at the University of Arizona. In 2016 she was promoted to associate professor and in 2022 became full professor.

== Recognition ==
The American Astronomical Society (AAS) named Pascucci to the 2022 class of AAS Fellows, "for her scientific contributions to the understanding of how planet-forming disks evolve and disperse".
