= Mashkouda =

King of Makuria
- Reign: 4 June 1276 – c. 1279
- Predecessor: David
- Successor: Barak
- Died: c. 1279
- Religion: Coptic Orthodox Christianity

Mashkouda (Old Nubian: ⲙⲁϣⲕⲟⲩⲇⲁ, lit. "Servant of the Sun") was king of the Nubian kingdom of Makuria from 4 June 1276 to his assassination in the late 70s. In Arabic sources he appears as Shekanda.

Mashkouda was a relative of king David, being either his cousin or nephew. After David had attacked the border town of Aswan he accompanied a Mamluk expedition in 1276 to detain David and install Mashkouda as Makurian king. David was defeated and fled to the Kingdom of al-Abwab, but was taken prisoner and deported to Cairo. Mashkouda was proclaimed king of Makuria on 4 June 1276. The price was that he became a Mamluk tributary. He ruled until the Mamluks had him assassinated in the late 70s.

== See also ==
- List of rulers of Makuria
