= Volonteri =

Volonteri is an Italian surname. Notable people with the surname include:

- Marta Volonteri (born 1974), Italian astrophysicist
- Simeone Volonteri (1831–1904), Italian missionary and bishop
