= Karl Schwarzschild Medal =

The Karl Schwarzschild Medal, named after the astrophysicist Karl Schwarzschild, is an award presented by the Astronomische Gesellschaft (German Astronomical Society) to eminent astronomers and astrophysicists.

== Recipients ==
Source: German Astronomical Society

| Year | Name |
|---|---|
| 2026 | Marta Volonteri |
| 2025 | Paola Caselli |
| 2024 | Anton Zensus |
| 2023 | Thomas Henning |
| 2022 | Hans-Thomas Janka |
| 2021 | Jocelyn Bell |
| 2020 | Friedrich-Karl Thielemann |
| 2019 | Ewine van Dishoeck |
| 2018 | Andrzej Udalski |
| 2017 | Richard Wielebinski |
| 2016 | Robert Williams |
| 2015 | Immo Appenzeller |
| 2014 | Margaret Geller |
| 2013 | Karl-Heinz Rädler |
| 2012 | Sandra M. Faber |
| 2011 | Reinhard Genzel |
| 2010 | Michel Mayor |
| 2009 | Rolf-Peter Kudritzki |
| 2008 | Rashid Sunyaev |
| 2007 | Rudolf Kippenhahn |
| 2005 | Gustav Andreas Tammann |
| 2004 | Riccardo Giacconi |
| 2003 | Erika Boehm-Vitense |
| 2002 | Charles H. Townes |
| 2001 | Keiichi Kodaira |
| 2000 | Roger Penrose |
| 1999 | Jeremiah P. Ostriker |
| 1998 | Peter A. Strittmatter |
| 1997 | Joseph H. Taylor |
| 1996 | Kip Thorne |
| 1995 | Hendrik C. van de Hulst |
| 1994 | Joachim Trümper |
| 1993 | Raymond Wilson |
| 1992 | Fred Hoyle |
| 1990 | Eugene N. Parker |
| 1989 | Martin J. Rees |
| 1987 | Lodewijk Woltjer |
| 1986 | Subrahmanyan Chandrasekhar |
| 1985 | Edwin E. Salpeter |
| 1984 | Daniel M. Popper |
| 1983 | Donald Lynden-Bell |
| 1982 | Jean Delhaye |
| 1981 | Bohdan Paczyński |
| 1980 | Ludwig Biermann |
| 1978 | George B. Field |
| 1977 | Wilhelm Becker |
| 1975 | Lyman Spitzer |
| 1974 | Cornelis de Jager |
| 1972 | Jan H. Oort |
| 1971 | Antony Hewish |
| 1969 | Bengt Strömgren |
| 1968 | Maarten Schmidt |
| 1963 | Charles Fehrenbach |
| 1959 | Martin Schwarzschild (son of Karl Schwarzschild) |

== See also ==
- List of astronomy awards
