= Kudanbes =

King of Makuria
- First reign: 1311–1316
- Predecessor: Ayay
- Successor: Abdallah Barshanbu
- Second reign: 1323
- Predecessor: Kanz ad-Dawla Muhammad
- Successor: Kanz ad-Dawla Muhammad
- Born: 13th century
- Died: After 1326
- Religion: Coptic Orthodox Christianity

Kudanbes (Old Nubian: ⲕⲟⲩⲇⲛ̅ⲡⲉⲥ, Koudanpes, or ⲕⲟⲩⲇⲛ̅ⲡⲉⲥⲁ, Koudanpesa, "Brother of the Servant [of God]"), also known as Kerenbes, was king of the Nubian kingdom of Makuria from 1311 to 1316 and again briefly in 1323.

== Life ==
Kudanbes, like his predecessor Ayay, was a brother of king David. Kudanbes reportedly seized the throne in 1311, when he killed Ayay. As Makuria was a Mamluk vassal Kudanbes travelled to Cairo in early 1312 to appease the Mamluk sultan Al-Nasir Muhammad with gifts. Despite this the latter eventually decided to replace him with Abdallah Barshanbu, a nephew of David who had converted to Islam. Kudanbes was aware of the Mamluk plan and suggested that if Al-Nasir Muhammad intended to install a Muslim king, he might as well choose Kanz ad-Dawla Muhammad, who was his nephew and ruler of the Banu Kanz tribe of Aswan. Despite this the Mamluks sent an army in late 1316 to install Abdallah Barshanbu. Kudanbes fled to the Kingdom of al-Abwab, but was detained and sent to Cairo.

Kanz ad-Dawla Muhammad eventually seized control of the Makurian throne, but since the Mamluks feared his influence over the Bedouin they decided to depose him in favour of Kudanbes in 1323. As soon as the Mamluk army left the capital Dongola Kanz ad-Dawla Muhammad deposed him and expelled him to Aswan, where he still lived in 1326.

== Inscription from Anba Hatra ==
Kudanbes is also known from a long inscription in the Anba Hatra Monastery in Aswan written by a certain courtier called Kartolaos. It is composed in Nubianized Greek and commemorates a visit by king Kudanbes and his retinue in April 1322, perhaps as prelude to the Mamluk installation attempt in 1323. His retinue was described as very large, consisting of bishops, priests and civil dignitaries bearing a variety of Greek and Latin titles.

== See also ==
- List of rulers of Makuria
