= HS Hydrae =

Triple star in the constellation of Hydra

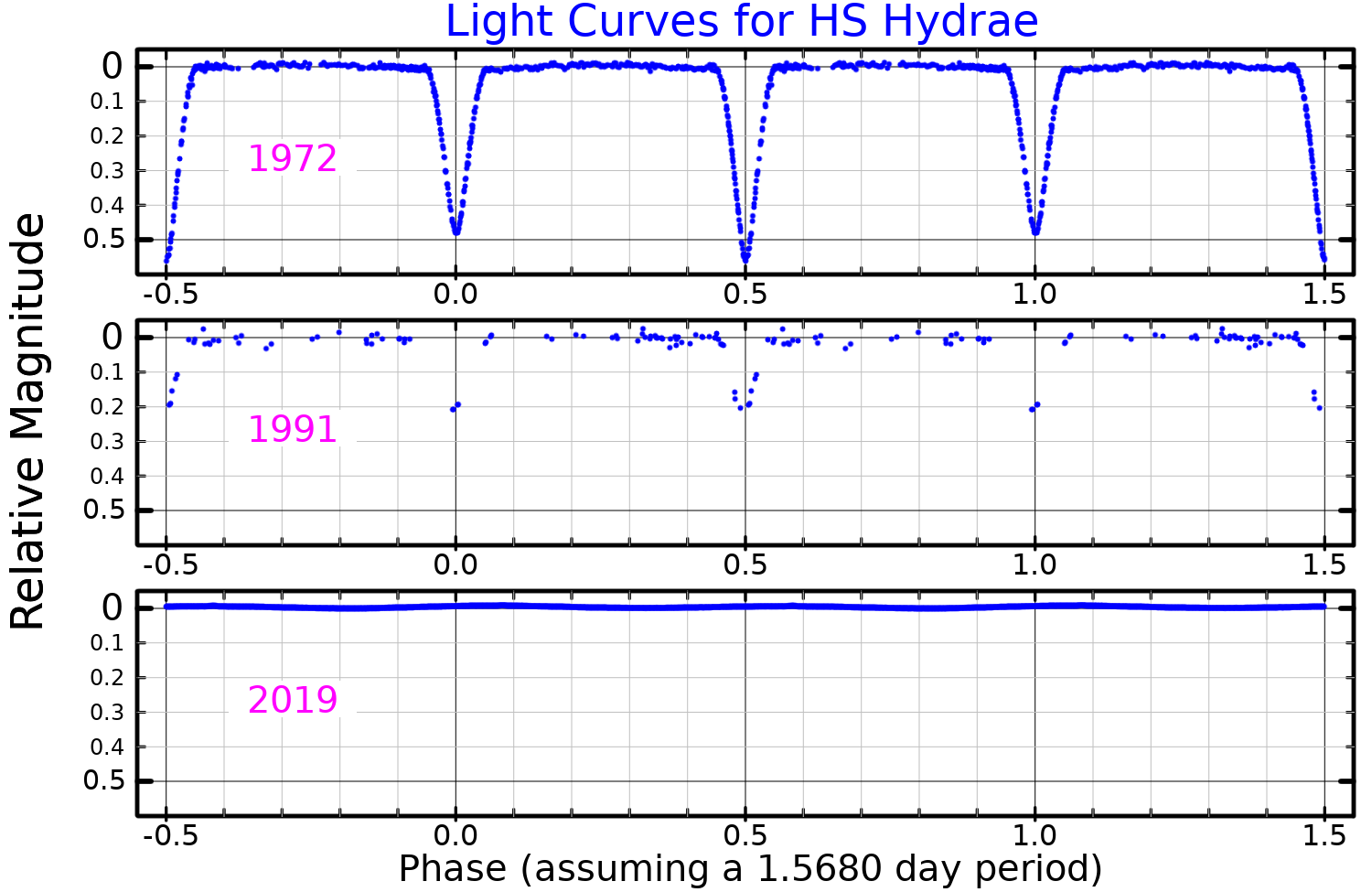
- Light curves showing the eclipses of HS Hydrae on three different years. The top plot is from data published by Gyldenkerne et al., the center plot shows Hipparcos data, and the bottom plot shows TESS data.

Observation data Epoch J2000.0 Equinox ICRS
- Constellation: Hydra
- Right ascension: 10^{h} 24^{m} 36.768^{s}
- Declination: −19° 05′ 32.96″
- Apparent magnitude (V): 8.08

Characteristics
- Evolutionary stage: main sequence
- Spectral type: F5V
- B−V color index: 0.466±0.014
- Variable type: β Per

Astrometry
Radial velocity (R_{v})	−7.13±0.2 km/s
Proper motion (μ)	RA: −14.017 mas/yr Dec.: −10.686 mas/yr
Parallax (π)	9.7366±0.0643 mas
Distance	335 ± 2 ly (102.7 ± 0.7 pc)
Absolute magnitude (M_{V})	3.25

Orbit
Primary	HS Hya A
Name	HS Hya B
Period (P)	1.56804098 ± 0.00000014 days
Semi-major axis (a)	≥ 7.656±0.014 R_{☉}
Semi-amplitude (K_{1}) (primary)	121.73±0.30 km/s
Semi-amplitude (K_{2}) (secondary)	125.38±0.35 km/s

Orbit
Primary	HS Hya AB
Name	HS Hya C
Period (P)	190.530±0.015 days
Semi-major axis (a)	≥ 34.5±1.1 R_{☉}
Eccentricity (e)	0.246±0.029
Periastron epoch (T)	2,448,047.2±3.4 HJD
Argument of periastron (ω) (secondary)	111.2±7.6°
Semi-amplitude (K_{1}) (primary)	9.02±0.31 km/s

Details

HS Hya A
Mass	1.31±0.03 M_{☉}
Radius	1.275±0.007 R_{☉}
Temperature	6,500±50 K

HS Hya B
Mass	1.27±0.03 M_{☉}
Radius	1.216±0.007 R_{☉}
Temperature	6,400±50 K

HS Hya C
Mass	0.56^{+0.12}_{−0.09} M_{☉}

Other designations
- BV 701, HS Hya, BD−18 2927, HD 90242, HIP 50966, SAO 155964, PPM 222916

Database references
SIMBAD	data

HS Hydrae is a triple star system in the equatorial constellation of Hydra. The inner pair were an eclipsing binary during the period 1920 until 2019, with HS Hya being the variable star designation. With a base apparent visual magnitude of 8.08, HS Hya is too dim to be viewed with the naked eye. During the primary eclipse, the magnitude dropped to 8.61; the secondary eclipse lowered the magnitude to 8.55. Based on parallax measurements, the system is located at a distance of approximately 335 light years from the Sun. It is drifting closer with a mean radial velocity of −7 km/s.

This star was determined to be an Algol variable as part of a survey of bright southern stars by W. Strohmeierand and associates in 1965, demonstrating it is a binary system with an orbital inclination close to the line of sight from the Earth. D. M. Popper found an eclipse periodicity of 1.568024 days for the pair with a combined estimated class of F3–F4. A longer-term analysis of the system's radial velocities in 1997 showed a third member of the system is likely orbiting the inner pair. This is probably a small red dwarf with about half the mass of the Sun and an orbital period of ~190 days.

In 1997, observations with the Hipparcos satellite showed the depth of both eclipses was lower than they were 20 years earlier. In 2012, P. Zasche and A. Paschke showed that the inclination of the orbital plane for the inner pair had changed by 15° since its discovery. The third member of the system is causing the orbit of the inner pair to precess, resulting in a change of inclination of 7.8° over the same period. By 2022, the eclipses have come to an end, with the final observed events captured by the TESS space telescope in 2019. Examination of earlier data showed that the eclipses had begun in the early 1920s, and the system is predicted to resume eclipses in 2195.

The combined stellar classification of this system is F5V, matching an F-type main-sequence star. The inner pair form a detached binary system that show ellipsoidal variation due to tidal interaction. The primary member, designated component A, has 1.31 times the mass and 1.28 times the radius of the Sun. The marginally smaller secondary, component B, has 1.27 times the mass with 1.22 times the radius of the Sun. The unseen third member, component C, has about 56% of the Sun's mass.
