= UV Piscium =

Binary star system in the Pisces constellation

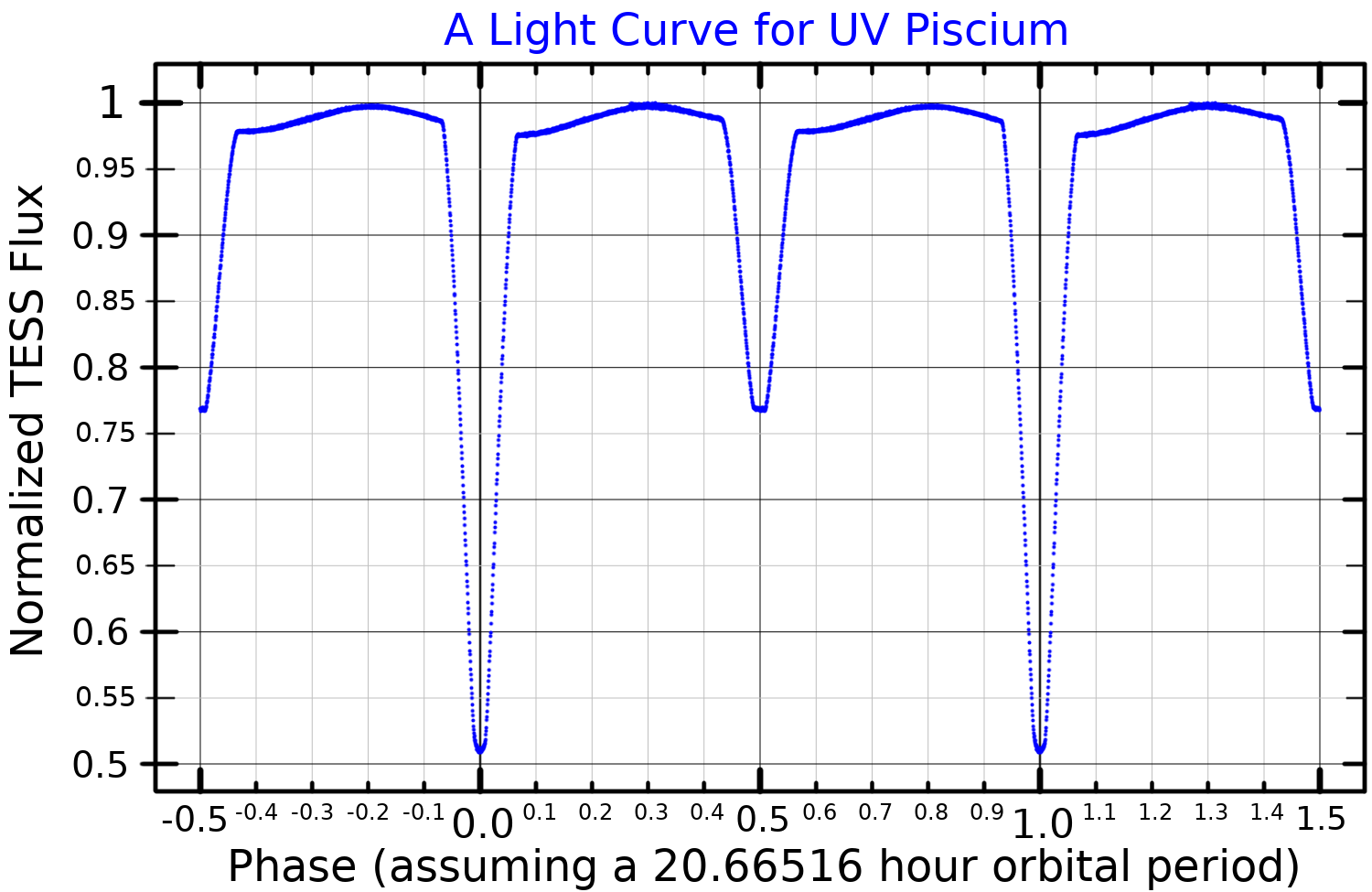
- A light curve for UV Piscium plotted from TESS data

Observation data Epoch J2000 Equinox ICRS
- Constellation: Pisces
- Right ascension: 01^{h} 16^{m} 55.119^{s}
- Declination: +06° 48′ 42.13″
- Apparent magnitude (V): 8.98

Characteristics

Primary
- Evolutionary stage: Main sequence
- Spectral type: G5V
- B−V color index: 0.65±0.02
- Variable type: Detached Algol + RS CVn

Secondary
- Evolutionary stage: Main sequence
- Spectral type: K3V
- B−V color index: 1.04±0.07

Astrometry
| Radial velocity (R_{v}) | 6.45±0.40 km/s |
| Proper motion (μ) | RA: +85.250 mas/yr Dec.: +20.946 mas/yr |
| Parallax (π) | 14.0593±0.0236 mas |
| Distance | 232.0 ± 0.4 ly (71.1 ± 0.1 pc) |
| Absolute magnitude (M_{V}) | 4.48±0.05 |

Orbit
| Period (P) | 0.86104716 d |
| Eccentricity (e) | 0.0 (assumed) |
| Inclination (i) | 88.9±2.0° |
| Periastron epoch (T) | 2,448,897.4226±0.0003 HJD |
| Semi-amplitude (K_{1}) (primary) | 117.20±0.18 km/s |
| Semi-amplitude (K_{2}) (secondary) | 154.81±0.37 km/s |

Details

Primary
| Mass | 1.0225±0.0058 M_{☉} |
| Radius | 1.096 R_{☉} |
| Surface gravity (log g) | 4.340±0.018 cgs |
| Temperature | 5,780±100 K |
| Metallicity [Fe/H] | 0.025±0.066 dex |
| Rotation | 0.86 d |
| Rotational velocity (v sin i) | 71.01+0.37 −0.36 km/s |
| Age | 4.7 Gyr |

Secondary
| Mass | 0.7741±0.0034 M_{☉} |
| Radius | 0.829 R_{☉} |
| Surface gravity (log g) | 4.478±0.019 cgs |
| Temperature | 4,750±80 K |
| Rotation | 0.86 d |
| Rotational velocity (v sin i) | 51.66+1.25 −1.20 km/s |

Other designations
- UV Psc, BD+06°189, HD 7700, HIP 5980, SAO 109778

Database references
| SIMBAD | data |

UV Piscium is a binary star system in the constellation of Pisces. With a peak apparent visual magnitude of 8.98, it is too faint to be visible to the naked eye. This is an eclipsing binary system that decreases to magnitude 10.05 during the primary eclipse, then to magnitude 9.54 with the secondary eclipse. It is located at a distance of 232 light years from the Sun based on parallax measurements, and is receding with a radial velocity of 6.5 km/s. The position of this star near the ecliptic means it is subject to lunar occultation.

This star was found to be variable by H. Huth in 1959. He determined it to be an eclipsing binary and published the first light curve with a period of 20.67 hours. R. B. Carr in 1969 proposed this to be an Algol-type variable with a minor tidal distortion of the components, plus a large, anomalous asymmetry in the light curve. D. S. Hall in 1976 grouped it among the class of short-period RS CVn binaries. The following year, variable, non-thermal radio emission was detected coming from this system, the first such discovered for a short-period binary.

Daniel M. Popper in 1969 found a double-lined, G-type spectrum with both components showing emission in the H and K lines. In 1979, A. R. Sadik deduced the system is a detached binary and suggested a bright, hot spot may produce the observed asymmetry in the light curve. He found stellar classifications of G2V and K0IV for the primary and secondary components, respectively. With improved spectra, Popper found main sequence classes of G5 and K3 for the two stars. The presence of a prominence was deduced in 1992, and a flare of hydrogen alpha was observed the following year.

This is a close binary system with an orbital period of 0.86 days. The orbit is circular and the components are spinning rapidly in-sync with their orbital period. This rotation rate is making both stars magnetically active, with average magnetic field strengths of 137 G and 88 G for the primary and secondary, respectively. Magnetic activity cycles appear to be causing the orbital period to oscillate with a 61 year period. The primary is a G-type main-sequence star of about the same size and mass as the Sun, while the secondary is a smaller K-type main-sequence star. They are estimated to be about 4.6 billion years old.
