= Abdallah Barshanbu =

Sayf al-Din Abdallah Barshanbu
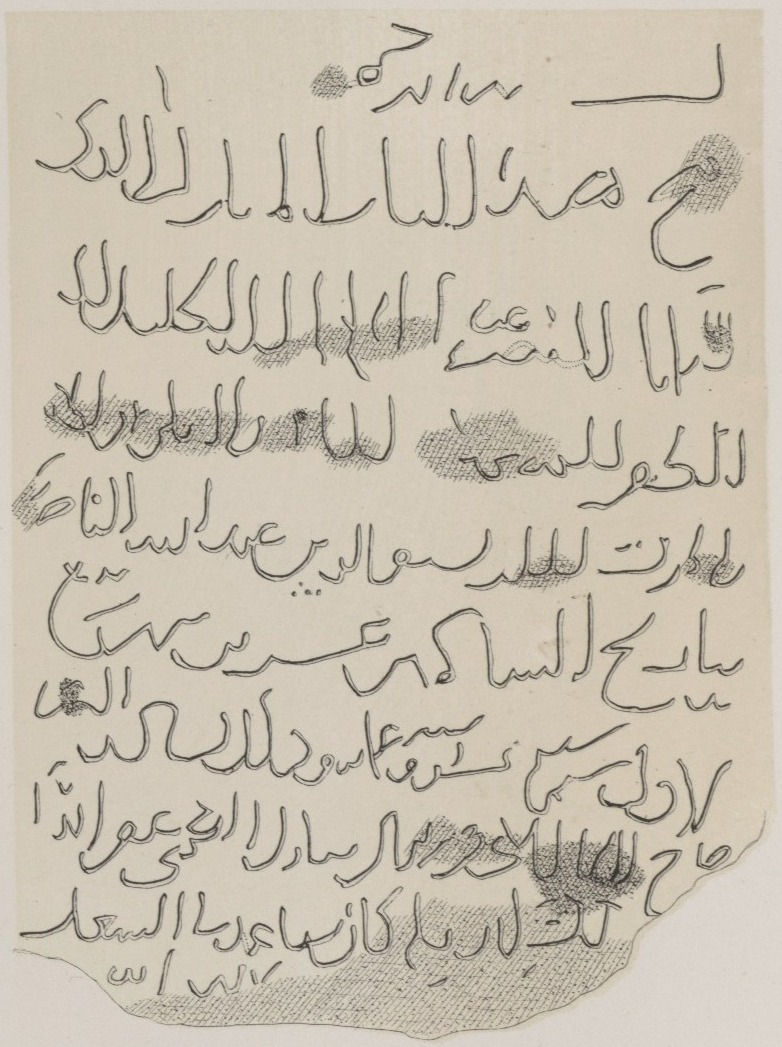
- Arabic stela from the Throne Hall of Dongola issued under Abdallah Barshanbu in 1317

King of Makuria
- Reign: 1316–1317
- Predecessor: Kudanbes
- Successor: Abram
- Born: 13th century
- Died: 1317
- Religion: Sunni Islam

Sayf al-Din Abdallah Barshanbu (Arabic: سيف الدين عبد الله برشنبي) or simply Abdallah Barshanbu was king of the Nubian kingdom of Makuria from 1316 to his death in 1317.

Despite his brief reign he is noteworthy for being the first Muslim ruler of the Christian kingdom of Makuria. He was a nephew of king David, who had been detained in Cairo since 1276. Installed by Mamluk Sultan Al-Nasir Muhammad in 1316, he was deeply unpopular and eventually killed a year later by Kanz ad-Dawla Muhammad, another Muslim nephew of David and ruler of the Banu Kanz tribe. The latter refused the Makurian crown and agreed to transfer it to Abraam, a brother of Kudanbes. He ruled for just three days, after which Kanz ad-Dawla seized the Makurian crown.

== Inscription from Dongola ==
Abdallah Barshanbu is mentioned in an Arabic stela from the so-called Throne Hall of Dongola. It is dated to 1 June 1317 and commemorates its conversion into a mosque.

== See also ==
- List of rulers of Makuria
