= Kingdom of al-Abwab =

Medieval Nubian kingdom

al-Abwab
- 13th century–15th/16th century?
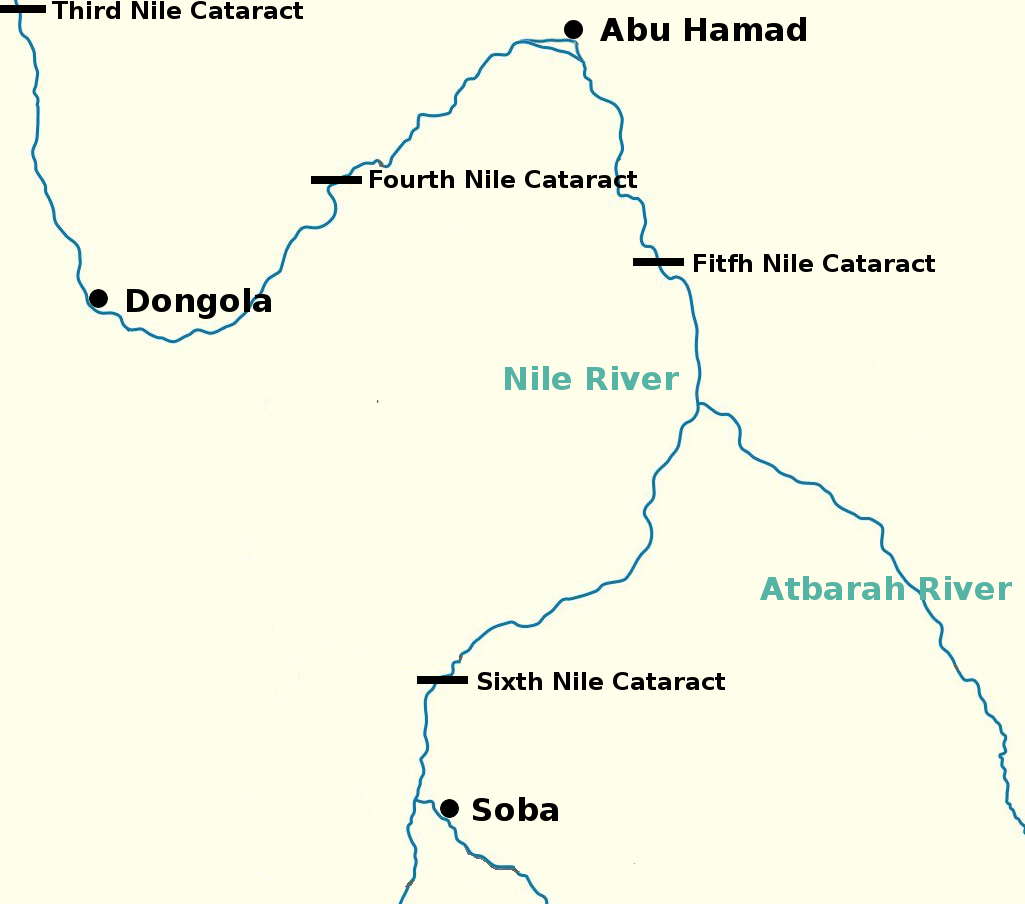
- Al-Abwab was located somewhere between Abu Hamad and Soba, the capital of Alodia
- Common languages: Nubian
- Religion: Coptic Orthodox Christianity; Islam
- Government: Monarchy
  - fl. 1276–1292: Adur
- Historical era: Late Middle Ages
  - Independence from Alodia: 13th century
  - Last mentioned: 1367
  - Disestablished: 15th/16th century?
Preceded by	Succeeded by
Alodia	Funj Sultanate
- Today part of: Sudan

The kingdom of al-Abwab (Arabic: الأبواب, al-Ɂabwāb, "The Doors" or "The Gates") was a medieval Nubian monarchy in present-day central Sudan. Initially the most northerly province of Alodia, it appeared as an independent kingdom from 1268/69. Thenceforth it was repeatedly recorded by Arabic sources in relation to the wars between its northern neighbour Makuria and the Egyptian Mamluk sultanate, where it generally sided with the latter. In 1367 it is mentioned for the last time, but based on pottery finds it has been suggested that the kingdom continued to exist until the 15th, perhaps even the 16th, century. During the reign of Funj king Amara Dunqas (r. 1504–1533/4) the region is known to have become part of the Funj Sultanate.

== Location ==
Al-Abwab has not been precisely located. Al-Aswani wrote in the 10th century that the Atbara was located within al-Abwab, but also implied that its northern border was further north, at the great Nile bend. In 1317 al-Abwab was located around the confluence of the Atbara and the Nile, while in 1289 it was recorded that it could be reached after travelling three days from Mograt Island, suggesting that its northern border was in the proximity of Abu Hamad. (Note: Pottery discovered in a church in western Mograt Island is clearly linked to Makuria, although also showing some Alodian influence.) In the early 20th century it was noted that Sudanese used the term al-Abwab to describe a region in the proximity of Meroe. Archaeologist David Edwards states that the material culture of the Nile Valley between Abu Hamad, where the Nile bends westwards, and the Atbara was affiliated with Makuria rather than Alodia.

== History ==
Very little is known about the history of al-Abwab. Before becoming independent it was the northernmost province of Alodia. It seems that the province was governed by an official appointed by the Alodian king. Archaeological evidence from Soba, the capital of Alodia, suggests a decline of the town and therefore possibly the whole kingdom from the 12th century. It is not known how al-Abwab seceded from Alodia. It appears in 1268/69, after king David of Makuria deposed his uncle Murtashkara and banished his sons to there. By 1276 al-Mufaddal described it as controlling "vast territories". It was mentioned in relation to the war between Makuria and the Mamluk sultanate: King David had attacked Aydhab and Aswan, provoking the Mamluk sultan Baybars to retaliate. In March 1276 the latter reached Dongola, where David was defeated in battle. Afterwards he fled to the kingdom of al-Abwab in the south. However, Adur, the king of al-Abwab, handed him over to the Muslims, which, according to al-Nuwayri, happened after Adur defeated David in battle and captured him afterwards. Al-Mufaddal stated that he handed David over because he was afraid of the Mamluk Sultan. In consequence of this war a Mamluk puppet king was instated in Dongola, and was watched over by an Assassin from al-Abwab.

In 1286 Adur is mentioned again. He is recorded as having sent an ambassador to the Mamluk Sultan, who not only presented him with gifts in the form of an elephant and a giraffe, but also professed obedience to him. Furthermore, the ambassador complained about the hostility of the Mamluk puppet king in Dongola. Early the following year the Mamluks sent an ambassador back. In 1290 Adur is said to have waged a campaign against a Makuria king named Any, who had fled the country in 1289. However, it is far from clear who Any was: in 1289 the kings in Dongola were named Shemamun and Budemma. It is possible that he was merely a chieftain. Apart from the war against Any, Adur was also engaged in a campaign against an unnamed king who had invaded the land of Anaj, possibly referring to Alodia. He claimed that once his campaigns were successful the entire Bilad al-Sudan would be under the authority of the Mamluk sultan. In 1292 Adur was accused by the King of Makuria of devastating his country.

In 1316 the Mamluks again invaded Makuria, intending to replace the disobedient king Kudanbes with a Muslim monarch: Abdallah Barshanbu. Kudanbes fled to al-Abwab, but as 40 years before the king of al-Abwab had him seized and handed over to the Mamluks. One year later al-Abwab came into direct contact with the Mamluks: A Mamluk army pursued Bedouin brigands through central Sudan, following them to the port town of Sawakin, then westwards to the Atbara, which they followed upstream until reaching Kassala. Ultimately failing to catch the nomads, the Mamluks marched back down the Atbara until reaching al-Abwab. Al-Nuwayri claimed that al-Abwab's monarch, while too afraid to meet the army, sent them provisions. Despite this the Mamluk army began to plunder the country for food before finally continuing their march to Dongola.

In the 14th and 15th centuries Bedouin tribes migrated into, and took control over, much of Sudan. By 1367 it was recorded that the Mamluk Sultan corresponded with a Shaikh Junayd of the Arab Jawabira tribe, a branch of the Banu Ikrima, who had arrived in Nubia while accompanying the Mamluk invasions. He was recorded by al-Qalqashandi to have resided in al-Abwab, together with another Arab tribal Shaikh named Sharif.

There is no mention of al-Abwab in sources after the 14th century. However, archaeological evidence from the region suggests that al-Abwab survived until the rise of the Funj Sultanate, as Christian pottery has been found together with Funj pottery. Thus, it has been concluded that the state "certainly" thrived until the 15th and possibly even the 16th century. During the reign of the first Funj king, Amara Dunqas (r. 1504–1533/34), the Sudanese Nile Valley as far north as Dongola was unified under his rule.

== Religion ==
Al-Qashqandi wrote in 1412 that the king of al-Abwab had a similar titulature to the king of Armenia, implying that al-Abwab was a Christian state. Christian pottery continued to be produced in the region until the rise of the Funj. On the other hand, King Adur was probably a Muslim. The Assassin who was ordered by Sultan Baybars to watch over the Makurian puppet king was an Ismaeli Muslim. The Bedouin tribes that overran Nubia in the 14th and 15th centuries were Muslim, albeit only nominally. Nevertheless, they contributed to the Islamisation of the country by intermarrying with the Nubians. According to Sudanese traditions a Sufi teacher arrived in the region in the 15th century, with some claiming that he settled in Berber in 1445, while others state that he settled near al-Mahmiya (north of Meroe) at the end of the 15th century.

== Archaeology ==
Archaeological surveys in the 5th cataract region have found rich evidence for a medieval occupation. Further south, around Berber and the area just north of the Nile-Atbara confluence, the evidence for a medieval occupation is more slim. The ruined Meroitic temple of Dangeil was still visited in the medieval period and also featured eight intrusive burials dated to the late 12th or early 13th century. The burials are noteworthy for their rich jewelry and the unusual position of the bodies which diverge from the Christian Nubian norm (practically no grave goods, extended bodies, heads facing east). Similar burials are common as far south as Soba.
