= William Popper =

William Popper (October 29, 1874 – June 3, 1963) was a Jewish-American Orientalist and professor who was associated with the University of California, Berkeley for nearly 60 years.

== Life ==
Popper was born on October 29, 1874, in St. Louis, Missouri, the son of Simon Popper and Barbara Cohn.

Popper later moved to New York City and attended Brooklyn public schools and the College of the City of New York. He then attended Columbia University, graduating from there with an A.B. in 1896, an A.M. in 1897, and a Ph.D. in 1899. His doctoral dissertation was The Censorship of Hebrew Books. He then went abroad, studying at the University of Strasbourg, the University of Berlin, the Seminar für Orientalische Sprachen in Berlin, the Ecole Speciale des Langues Orientales Vivantes, the Ecole des Hautes Etudes, and the College de France. He was in Europe from 1899 to 1901, followed by travels all over the Middle East from 1901 to 1902.

Upon returning to America in 1902, he began working as The Jewish Encyclopedia's revising editor and chief of the bureau of translation. In 1903, he was appointed Columbia University's Gustav Gottheil lecturer in Semitic languages. He was also acting chief of the New York Public Library's oriental department during that time. In 1905, he became an instructor of Semitic languages for the University of California, Berkeley. He was promoted to assistant professor in 1906, associate professor in 1915, and professor in 1922. He briefly returned to Columbia to teach Semitic languages from 1919 to 1920. He retired as professor in 1945, but maintained an office on campus until he died.

His life's work was the manuscripts of 15th century Egyptian historian Ibn Taghribirdi; he edited five volumes of Al-Nujūm al-Zāhirah from 1909 to 1929, four volumes of Ḥawādith al-duhūr from 1930 to 1942, eight volumes of History of Egypt from 1954 to 1963, and two volumes of Egypt and Syria Under The Circassian Sultans from 1955 to 1957. His critical editions and translations helped make that period of Arabic history accessible to non-Arab speakers. He also conducted Biblical research into the literary and stylistic aspects of Isaiah, writing Parallelism in Isaiah in 1923 and The Prophetic Poetry of Isaiah in 1931. He was also presented with a jubilee volume of Semitic and Oriental Studies on his 75th birthday.

In 1906, Popper married Tess Magnes. The wedding was performed by Tess' brother Judah Leon Magnes. Their children were William Popper Jr., Mrs. Ruth Eisen, UCLA astronomer Dr. Daniel Popper, and Joel Popper.

Popper died on June 3, 1963.
