= Murtashkara =

King of Makuria
- Reign: ?–1268 or 1269
- Successor: David
- Born: First half of the 13th century
- Religion: Coptic Orthodox Christianity

Murtashkara, appearing in medieval Islamic sources as Abu al-Izz Murtashkara, was king of the Nubian kingdom of Makuria until he was deposed by David in 1268/9.

Mamluk sources report that Murtashkara grew blind about 1268/9. His nephew David seized the opportunity and imprisoned him, banished his sons to the Kingdom of al-Abwab in the south and seized the throne himself. Afterwards David sent gifts to the Mamluk Sultan Baybars, who recognized him as rightful Makurian king.

== See also ==
- List of rulers of Makuria
