= Georgios I of Makuria =

Georgios I
- Caesar

King of Makuria
- Reign: c. 856 – 887
- Predecessor: Zacharias III
- Born: c. 815; Dongola
- Died: c. 887
- Spouse: Mariam
- Issue: Zacharias IV
- Religion: Coptic Orthodox Christianity

Georgios I (Old Nubian: ⲅⲉⲱⲣⲅⲓⲟⲥ; Arabic: Firaki) was a ruler of the Nubian state of Makuria (c. 815 – c. 887). The events about the king are preserved in the writings of Egyptian historians al-Maqrizi, al-Balawi and Ibn Taghribirdi. Their description of the events is not always conclusive and they provide contradictory information at several points, making it difficult for modern historian to reconstruct the events.

== Life ==
=== Caesar ===
Georgios first appears in the historical record in 835 during the reign of his father Zacharias III when the 20 year old Georgios was appointed co-regent, possibly with the title of caesar (Ancient Greek: καῖσαρ), and dispatched him on along journey to Baghdad to settle a dispute with the Abbasid Caliphate. For several years Egypt had been wracked by the Fourth Fitna and Zacharias had halted payments of the baqt. Once the caliph's brother Ibrahim had gained control over Egypt he demanded the baqt be resumed and the payment of all arrears. It is not certain if he traveled all the way to Baghdad or whether he simply went to Cairo; either way his journey had a major effect, and, with the help of the patriarch Joseph I of Alexandria, a new treaty was signed canceling the arrears and changing the terms of the baqt so that it only needed to be paid once every three years. Georgios returned to Dongola in early 837, and appears to have co-ruled with his father.

There is another story of Georgios being captured in his youth and brought to Baghdad as a prisoner. It is possible, but unlikely, that he made the journey twice. It is also possible that in this story he was confused with another person.

=== Sole reign ===
Zacharias died sometime before 856, by which time Georgios was ruling alone. Unlike his Roman predecessors and Byzantine contemporaries, Georgios continued to use the title of Caesar rather than the traditionally senior title of Augustus which his father had used.

During his long reign the Arab adventurer Abu al-Rahman al-Umari invaded the gold mining area near Abu Haman with his private army. Georgios dispatched his nephew and heir Niuty to battle him, but Niuty rebelled. Georgios sent one of his sons, but he was defeated and forced to flee to Alodia. Another son, Zacharias, was dispatched, defeated once by Niuty's forces he allied himself with al-Umari and defeated Niuty. He then turned on al-Umari forcing him back to the north.

=== Death and succession ===
Georgios' longevity is attested to by the 13th century Coptic priest Abu al-Makarim, who records a portrait in a Nubian church depicting "Georgios, son of Zacharias, king of Nubia, as an old man... his age is eighty years." This is confirmed by the funerary inscription of the Makurian tetrarch Mariankouda in June 887 which mentions the deceased Georgios, suggesting the king had died not long before. It is unknown who directly succeeded Georgios, but one of his sons Zacharias IV eventually came to the throne in 916/917. Georgios' wife Mariam ruled as queen mother (Ancient Greek: μήτηρ βασιλέως) during her son's reign.

== Bibliography ==
- Abu al-Makarim. The Churches and Monasteries of Egypt and some neighbouring countries, attributed to Abu Salih the Armenian, trans. B.T.A Evetts, Oxford 1895.
- Al-Maqrizi. Book of Exhortations and Useful Lessons in Dealing with Topography and Historical Remains trans. K. Stowasser. Liege 2022.
- Severus ibn al-Muqaffa. History of the Patriarchs of Alexandria trans. B. Evetts, History of the Patriarchs of the Coptic Church of Alexandria III. 1910 ( Patrologia Orientalis 5).
- Fritsch, Emmanuel (2018). "The Origins and Meanings of the Ethiopian Circular Church". In Robin Griffith-Jones, Eric Fernie (ed.). Tomb and Temple. Re-Imagining the Sacred Buildings of Jerusalem. Boydell. pp. 267–296. ISBN 9781783272808.
- Godlewski, Włodzimierz (2013b). Dongola-ancient Tungul. Archaeological guide (PDF). Polish Centre of Mediterranean Archaeology, University of Warsaw. ISBN 978-83-903796-6-1.
- Łajtar, Adam. (2003). Catalogue of the Greek Inscriptions in the Sudan National Museum at Khartoum. Peeters, Leuven (Orientalia Lovaniensia Analecta 122).
- Łajtar, Adam and Ochała, Grzegorz. "A Christian King in Africa: The Image of Christian Nubian Rulers in Internal and External Sources," in P. Forness, A. Hasse-Ungeheuer and H. Leppin (eds.) The Good Christian Ruler in the First Millenium: Views from the Wider Mediterranean World in Conversation (2021). De Gruyter (Millenium Studies 92).
- Welsby, Derek A. (2002). The Medieval Kingdoms of Nubia, British Museum Press, London. ISBN 0-7141-1947-4
- Werner, Roland (2013). Das Christentum in Nubien: Geschichte und Gestalt einer afrikanischen Kirche. (Studien zur Orientalischen Kirchengeschichte 48)
- Zurawski, B. (2021). "Christian and Islamic Nubia, 543–1820," Oxford Research Encyclopedia of African History.

Preceded by Zacharias III	King of Makuria	Succeeded by Zacharias IV
