= Karl-Heinz Rädler =

German astrophysicist (1935–2020)

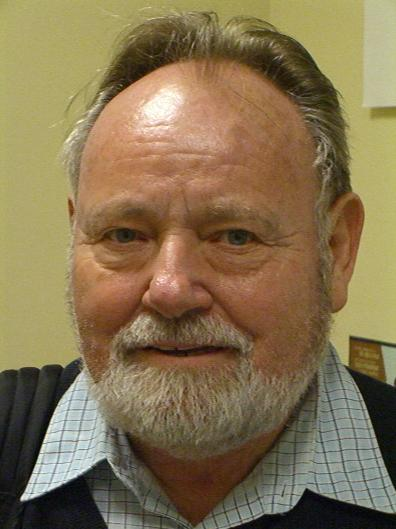
- Born: 14 May 1935; Riesa
- Died: 9 February 2020 (aged 84)
- Alma mater: University of Jena
- Awards: Karl Schwarzschild Medal (2013); Emil Wiechert Medal (1998)
- Website: www.aip.de/Members/khraedler/

Karl-Heinz Rädler (14 May 1935 – 9 February 2020) was an astrophysicist at the Leibniz Institute for Astrophysics Potsdam who worked on cosmic magnetic fields.

== Personal life ==
Rädler was born on 14 May 1935 in Riesa, Germany, being the youngest of two children of a clerk. He died on 9 February 2020 at the age of 84.

== Research ==
His research focused on cosmic magnetic fields. In the 1970s he explained how they were created in stars and planets using the dynamo model. He worked on the theory behind experiments with liquid sodium, which provided evidence for the cosmic dynamo.

== Career ==
He was the founding director of the Leibniz Institute for Astrophysics Potsdam, and he was its Scientific Chairman in 1992–1998, as well as leading its Cosmic Magnetic Fields group in 1992–2000. He was a professor at the University of Potsdam in 1994–2000. He was on the first senate of the re-founded Viadrina European University.

He was a scientist at the Central Institute for Astrophysics in the GDR, and an editor of Astronomische Nachrichten.

In 1998 he received the Emil Wiechert Medal from the German Geophysical Society, and the Wilhelm Foerster Prize from the Urania Potsdam. In 2013 he received the Karl Schwarzschild Medal from Astronomische Gesellschaft.
