= Laura Kreidberg =

American astrophysicist

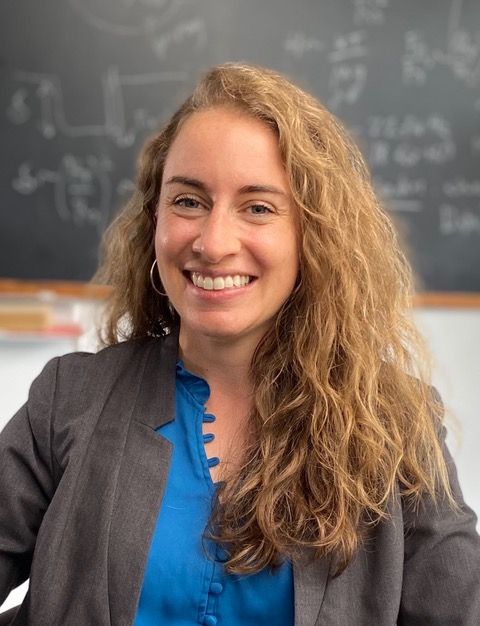
- Education: Yale University (Bachelor), University of Chicago (PhD)
- Awards: Annie Jump Cannon Award in Astronomy
- Scientific career
- Fields: Physics, Astronomy
- Workplaces: Max Planck Institute for Astronomy, Harvard-Smithsonian Center for Astrophysics, Harvard University
- Thesis: Glimpses of Far Away Places: Intensive Atmosphere Characterization of Extrasolar Planets (2016)
- Doctoral advisor: Jacob L. Bean

Laura Kreidberg is an American astronomer who primarily studies exoplanets. Since 2020, she has been director at the Max Planck Institute for Astronomy (MPIA) in Heidelberg, where she is leading the Atmospheric Physics of Exoplanets (APEx) department. She is MPIA's managing director as of January 2024.

== Education and career ==
Kreidberg studied physics and astronomy at Yale University, where she received her Bachelor of Science degree in 2011. In 2016, she received her PhD in astronomy and astrophysics from the University of Chicago. She was then an ITC Fellow and Junior Fellow of the Society of Fellows at Harvard University from 2016. From 2019 to 2020, she was a Clay Fellow at the Harvard-Smithsonian Center for Astrophysics. Since 2020, she is a Director at the MPI for Astronomy. She is currently a co-investigator on multiple instrumentation projects, such as ELT/METIS and GRAVITY+, which plans to significantly enhance ground-based exoplanet observations.

== Work ==
Kreidberg's area of work is the physics of exoplanet atmospheres. One focus is the observation of hot Jupiters and rocky planets by transmission and emission spectroscopy of transiting exoplanets. She is PI of two approved CYCLE 1 GO observing programs with the James Webb Space Telescope.

== Honours and awards ==
- Annie Jump Cannon Award, American Astronomical Society 2021
- Paul Hertelendy Lecturer, Harvard–Smithsonian Center for Astrophysics 2018
- International Astronomical Union Division F PhD Prize 2017
- Peter B. Wagner Memorial Award for Women in Atmospheric Sciences 2015
- George Beckwith Prize for excellence in astronomy, Yale Astronomy Department 2011
