= Erika Böhm-Vitense =

American astrophysicist (1923–2017)

- Born: Erika Vitense; June 3, 1923; Kurau (now to Stockelsdorf), Schleswig-Holstein, Germany
- Died: January 21, 2017 (aged 93); Seattle, Washington, U.S.
- Education: University of Kiel
- Known for: Mixing Length theory, Barium stars, stellar astrophysics
- Spouse: Karl-Heinz Hermann Böhm
- Children: 4
- Awards: Annie Jump Cannon Award in Astronomy, Karl Schwarzschild Medal
- Scientific career
- Fields: Astrophysics
- Workplaces: University of Washington, Seattle
- Academic advisors: Ludwig Biermann, Albrecht Unsöld

Erika Helga Ruth Böhm-Vitense (June 3, 1923 – January 21, 2017) was a German-born American astrophysicist known for her work on Cepheid variables and convection in stellar atmospheres.

== Early life ==
Böhm-Vitense was born Erika Helga Ruth Vitense on 3 June 1923 in Kurau, Germany. She was the second of three girls. Her parents, Wilma and Hans Vitense were both teachers. She, along with her sisters, was raised in Lübeck, Germany.

== Education ==
Erika started her undergraduate studies at University of Tübingen in 1943. However, she moved to Kiel University in 1945 in favor of a stronger astronomy department than at her first institution. She completed her undergraduate degree in 1948.

She remained at Kiel for her graduate studies, working with Albrecht Unsöld. Erika successfully defended her thesis Continuous absorption coefficients as a function of pressure and temperature in the Sun in 1951 and received her doctorate degree.

== Work and research efforts ==
After receiving her Ph.D., Erika remained at Kiel as a Research Associate.

Two years after receiving her Ph.D., she published Die Wasserstoffkonvektionszone der Sonne. Mit 11 Textabbildungen which translates to The hydrogen convection zone of the Sun. With 11 text illustrations. This is one of her most famous works as it has been cited 287 times since its publication.

After getting married in 1954, she and her husband visited Lick Observatory and University of California, Berkeley for one year. Upon their return to Kiel, her husband, who was also an astrophysicist, was given a tenure track position, but she was not.

In 1968, they both moved to the University of Washington where she started as Senior Research Associate. She was awarded a full-time professor position in 1971, and became a professor emeritus later on. During her time at the University of Washington, she made fundamental contributions to the understanding of stellar binaries, stellar temperatures, chromospheric activity, rotation, and convection. She also made substantial contributions to the fundamentals of Mixing Length Theory. She continued this work through the rest of her career.

Around 1978, Erika realized that the ultraviolet band of light was the best way to make observations of stellar chromospheres. The International Ultraviolet Explorer (IUE) launched in January 1978, and she was able to use this data to further her work.

== Notable works ==
Erika has over 300 academic papers on the Harvard Astrophysics Data System, of which she is the first author on more than two-thirds of these publications.

- Die Wasserstoffkonvektionszone der Sonne. Mit 11 Textabbildungen (Zeitschrift für Astrophysik: 1953)
- Introduction to Stellar Astrophysics (Cambridge University Press: 1989) ISBN 0-521-34869-2

== Personal life ==
Erika met her husband, Karl-Heinz Böhm at Kiel, where he was also in astrophysics. They married in 1953 and had four children: Hans, Manfred, Helga, and Eva.

== Death ==
Erika died on 21 January 2017 in Seattle, Washington.

== Honors and awards ==
- Best thesis prize at Kiel University in 1951.
- Annie Jump Cannon Prize from the American Astronomical Society in 1965.
- Elected as Fellow of the American Association for the Advancement of Science.
- Karl Schwarzschild Medal from the Astronomische Gesellschaft in 2003
