= Jean Delhaye =

French astronomer

Jean Robert Émile Delhaye
- Born: February 25, 1921; Lourches
- Died: April 2, 2001 (aged 80); Paris
- Citizenship: France
- Education: University of Rennes; University of Paris
- Awards: Karl Schwarzschild Medal (1982); Prix Jules Janssen (1987)
- Scientific career
- Fields: Astronomy
- Workplaces: Paris Observatory
- Doctoral advisor: André-Louis Danjon

Jean Delhaye (1921–2001) was a French astronomer and director of astronomical research at several institutes.

== Biography ==
After secondary studies in Valenciennes, he pursued higher education at the University of Rennes and the University of Paris. There he graduated with a doctorate in mathematical sciences in 1950. His thesis Contribution à l’étude de la distribution des vitesses stellaires (Contribution to the study of the distribution of stellar velocities) was supervised by André Danjon (who was the director of the Paris Observatory from 1945 to 1963). During his doctoral work, Delhaye acquired training from the world's leading specialists in galactic dynamics, Jan Oort in Leiden in 1948 and Bertil Lindblad in Stockholm in 1949. Delhaye worked from 1943 to 1957 at the Paris Observatory. From 1957 to 1964 he headed the Besançon Astronomical Observatory and taught in Besançon at the University of Franche-Comté. During those years, at the invitation of Abrahão de Moraes, he also established scientific contacts in Brazil, helped expand astronomical research there, and promoted cooperation between Brazilian and French astronomers.

In 1964 Delhaye returned to the Paris Observatory, where he was director from 1967 to 1971, as the successor to Jean-François Denisse. In 1971 Delhaye resigned from the Paris Observatory to head from 1971 to 1979 the newly formed Institut National d'Astronomie et de Géophysique (INAG) of the CNRS. He directed INAG's involvement in the Canada–France–Hawaii Telescope and EISCAT. During his years at the Paris Observatory and then at the INAG, he also held an appointment from 1966 to 1976 as maître de conférences (MCF) at the École polytechnique.

At its inception, INAG dealt only with astronomy, but Jean Coulomb and other geophysicists soon asked to join. Jacques Blamont urged INAG's involvement in space-based experiments. Around 1975, Bernard Grégory proposed that INAG's director should also be simultaneously the scientific director of the CNRS département TOAE (Terre, océan, astronomie, espace), i.e. planet Earth, ocean, astronomy, & space. From 1975 to 1978 Delhaye was the scientific director of INAG. His successor, Michel Petit, directed INAG from 1978 to 1985, when INAG became part of the Institut national des sciences de l'univers (INSU). After leaving INAG and the TOAE department, Delhaye returned in 1979 to the Paris Observatory, where he retired in 1987. In the 1980s he made significant contributions to the Hipparcos satellite experiment.

Delhaye did research on astrometry, correlations of the kinematic properties of stars with their physical properties, and the structure of the Milky Way. He contributed a chapter Solar Motion and Velocity Distribution of Common Stars to the 1965 book Galactic Structure, edited by Blaauw and Schmidt.

In April 1944 Jean Delhaye married Jeanne Guézel. They had two sons and three daughters.

== Awards and honours ==
Jean Delhaye was elected in 1964 a corresponding member of the Académie des sciences. He was the president of the Bureau des Longitudes from 1991 to 1992. He was appointed an Officer of the Ordre national de la Légion d'honneur, a Commander of the Ordre national du Mérite, and a Commander of the Ordre des Palmes académiques. In 1982 he received the Karl Schwarzschild Medal and at the awarding of the medal gave the lecture Die Bewegungen der Sterne und ihre Bedeutung in der galaktischen Astronomie (The motions of stars and their significance in galactic astronomy). In 1987 he received the Prix Jules Janssen with a laudation citing not only his research, but also his teaching, helping French astronomers, and furthering international scientific cooperation.
