= Sitall =

Sitall (also known as Sitall CO-115M or Astrositall) is a crystalline glass-ceramic with ultra-low coefficient of thermal expansion (CTE). It was originally manufactured in the former Soviet Union and was used in the making of primary mirrors for the Russian Maksutov telescopes. It has a CTE of only 0 ± 1.5×10^{−7} °C^{−1} in the temperature range −60 to 60 °C, placing it in a small group of transparent materials with low CTE such as Vycor, Zerodur, Cer‑Vit and fused quartz.

Materials of low coefficient of thermal expansion are critical in the manufacture of optical elements for telescopes. In segmented mirror telescopes, it is desirable to have this coefficient as near zero as possible, and to have a high degree of homogeneity in the material. The Southern African Large Telescope (SALT) selected Sitall for the manufacture of its 91 primary mirror segments by Lytkarino Optical Glass Plant. The choice arose out of increased scientific collaboration between Russia and South Africa since 1994. Sitall was also used for the primary and secondary mirrors of the VLT Survey Telescope.
