= Thomas Henning =

German astrophysicist

Thomas K. Henning
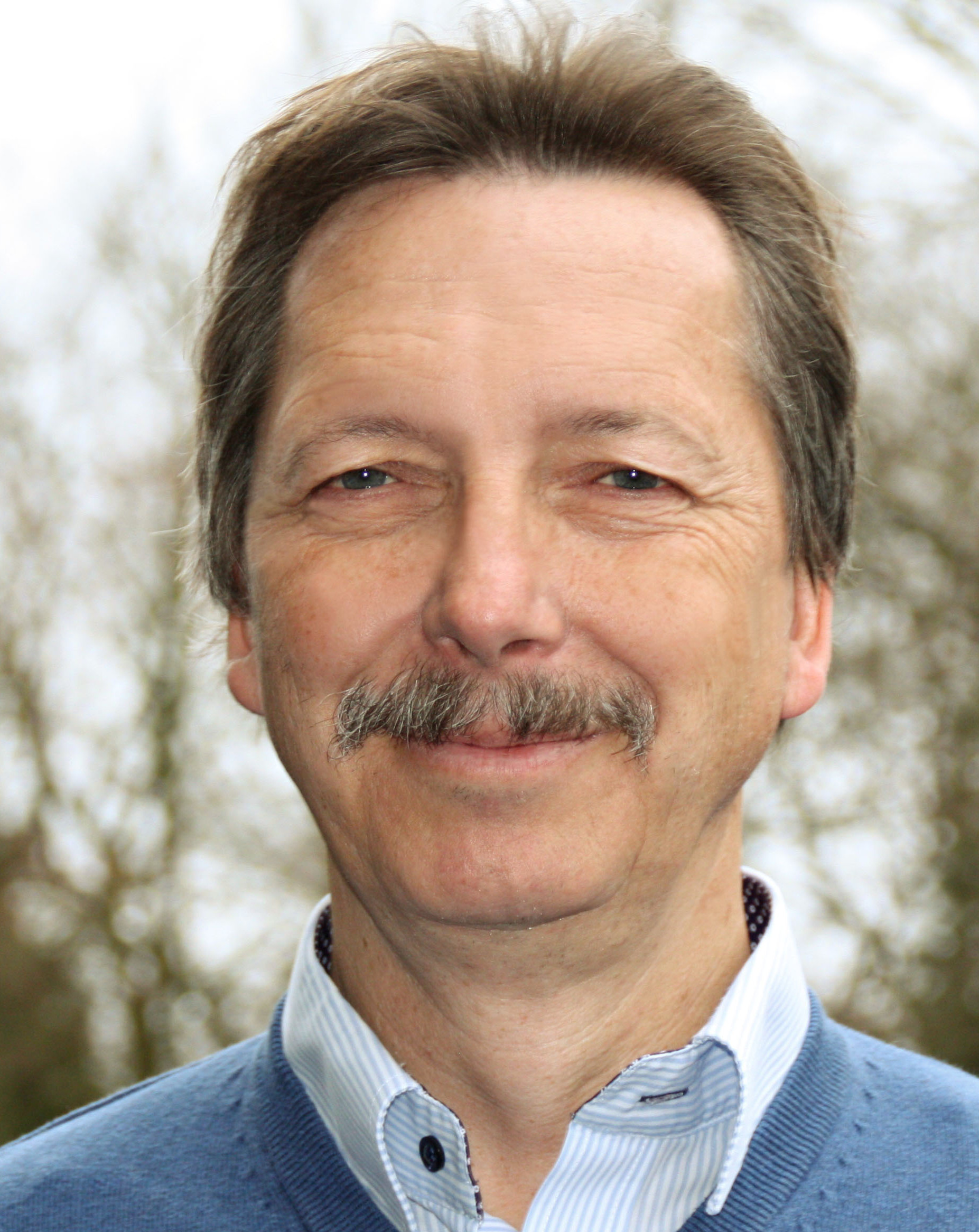
- Born: 9 April 1956 (age 70); Jena, Germany
- Education: Greifswald University (Diploma) / University of Jena (PhD)
- Scientific career
- Fields: Physics, Astronomy
- Workplaces: Max Planck Institute for Astronomy
- Doctoral advisor: Karl-Heinz Schmidt
- Doctoral students: Ilaria Pascucci

Thomas K. Henning (born 9 April 1956) is a German astrophysicist. He was a director at the Max Planck Institute for Astronomy between 2001 and 2024. Henning is an expert in the field of star and planet formation.

== Education and career ==
Henning studied physics and mathematics at the University of Greifswald, specializing in plasma physics. He continued his studies at the University of Jena, specializing in astronomy and astrophysics and obtaining his PhD in 1984. After joining Charles University in Prague as a postdoc (1984–1985), Henning returned to Jena where he served as an assistant at Jena Observatory, completing his habilitation in 1989. After the fall of Berlin Wall, he became a guest scientist at the Max Planck Institute for Radio Astronomy in Bonn 1989–1990 and a guest lecturer at the University of Cologne in 1991. Henning returned to the University of Jena that same year, taking over as managing scientist of the Max Planck Research Unit "Dust in Star-Forming Regions", a post he held until 1996. Henning also became a professor at Jena University in 1992.

In 1999, Henning became Chair of Astrophysics at Jena University; a position he was to hold until 2002. At the same time, he became Director of the Astrophysical Institute and of Jena Observatory. Thomas Henning served as a guest professor at the University of Amsterdam, the European Southern Observatory in Chile, at Hokkaido University in Sapporo, the University of Copenhagen, the Earth–Life Science Institute in Tokyo as well as at Konkoly Observatory in Budapest.

Between 2000 and 2007, he was co-chair of the DFG research group "Laboratory Astrophysics" in Chemnitz and Jena. From 2001 until 2024, Henning has been a director at the Max Planck Institute for Astronomy, where he was head of the planetary and star formation department. After his retirement in 2024, he continued to lead a research group at MPIA and is still a scientific member. He retains his professorship at Jena and, in 2003, joined the faculty at Heidelberg University as an honorary professor.

== Work ==
Henning works in the field of star and planet formation. One of his areas of specialization is the observation and modelling of protoplanetary disks around young stars – an early stage in the evolution of planetary systems. To this end, Henning has also done research on the properties of interstellar dust and, more generally, on the physics and chemistry of the interstellar medium – both theoretically and using the methods of laboratory astrophysics and observational astronomy. The focus of his observational work is at infrared and submillimeter wavelengths.

Throughout his career, Henning was and is involved in a number of major research projects, including the construction of instruments for the ESA Herschel Space Telescope, the James Webb Space Telescope and the European Southern Observatory telescopes, the construction of the Large Binocular Telescope in Arizona, the Spitzer Legacy Project "Formation of Planetary Systems", several Herschel Legacy Projects, the Pan-STARRS Survey and the HAT South Transit Network. He is also a fellow of the Max Planck School "Matter to Life", co-investigator of the Heidelberg Excellence Cluster "Structures", co-investigator of the EDEN Transit Survey for the search for Earth-like planets around M stars, co-investigator of the Heidelberg-Chile TESS Exoplanet Network, head of the MPIA laboratory "Origins of Life" and founding member of the European Astrobiology Institute. In 2019, he received an ERC (European Research Council) grant of 2.5 million euros for his project "From Planet-Forming Disks to Giant Planets".

He was and is a member of a number of astronomical steering and advisory bodies, including the ESO Council, the CAHA Board, the Board of Directors of LBT and PS1, and the Scientific Advisory Board of the Thuringian State Observatory in Tautenburg.

== Honours and awards ==
- Thuringian Research Award of the German federal state of Thuringia in the field of fundamental research (1998)
- Fellow of the German Academy of Sciences Leopoldina (since 2000)
- Naming of the asteroid 1992 SG2 to (30882) Tomhenning (2009)
- ESA JWST Significant Achievement Award (2013)
- Adjunct professor – Tata Institute of Fundamental Research, School of Natural Sciences, Mumbai, India (2016)
- Cozzarelli Prize (PNAS) of the National Academy of Sciences (2017)
- Honorary member of the Hungarian Academy of Science (2019)
- Adjunct Professor – Tokyo Institute of Technology, Tokyo, Japan (2019)
- Gay-Lussac–Humboldt Prize (2020)
- Honorary Doctorate – Lund University (2020)
- Karl Schwarzschild Medal (2023)
- Section Award for Science, Medicine, and Technology from the German Society for Photography as co-project leader of the MIRI project (2023)

== Video ==
- Henning on his research on the formation of planetary systems
