= Max Planck Institute for Astronomy =

Research institute of the Max Planck Society, Germany

Coordinates: 49°23′47″N 8°43′25″E

- MPIA logo
- Founder: Hans Elsässer
- Established: 1969
- Focus: Astronomy
- Managing Director: Laura Kreidberg
- Key people: Myriam Benisty, Hans-Walter Rix
- Address: Königstuhl 17, 69117 Heidelberg, Germany
- Location: Heidelberg, Baden-Württemberg, Germany
- Website: Official website

The Max-Planck-Institut für Astronomie (Max Planck Institute for Astronomy, MPIA) is a research institute of the Max Planck Society (MPG). It is located in Heidelberg, Baden-Württemberg, Germany near the top of the Königstuhl, adjacent to the historic Landessternwarte Heidelberg-Königstuhl astronomical observatory. The institute primarily conducts basic research in the natural sciences in the field of astronomy.

In addition to its own astronomical observations and astronomical research, the institute is also actively involved in the development of observation instruments. The instruments or parts of them are manufactured in the institute's own workshops.

== History ==
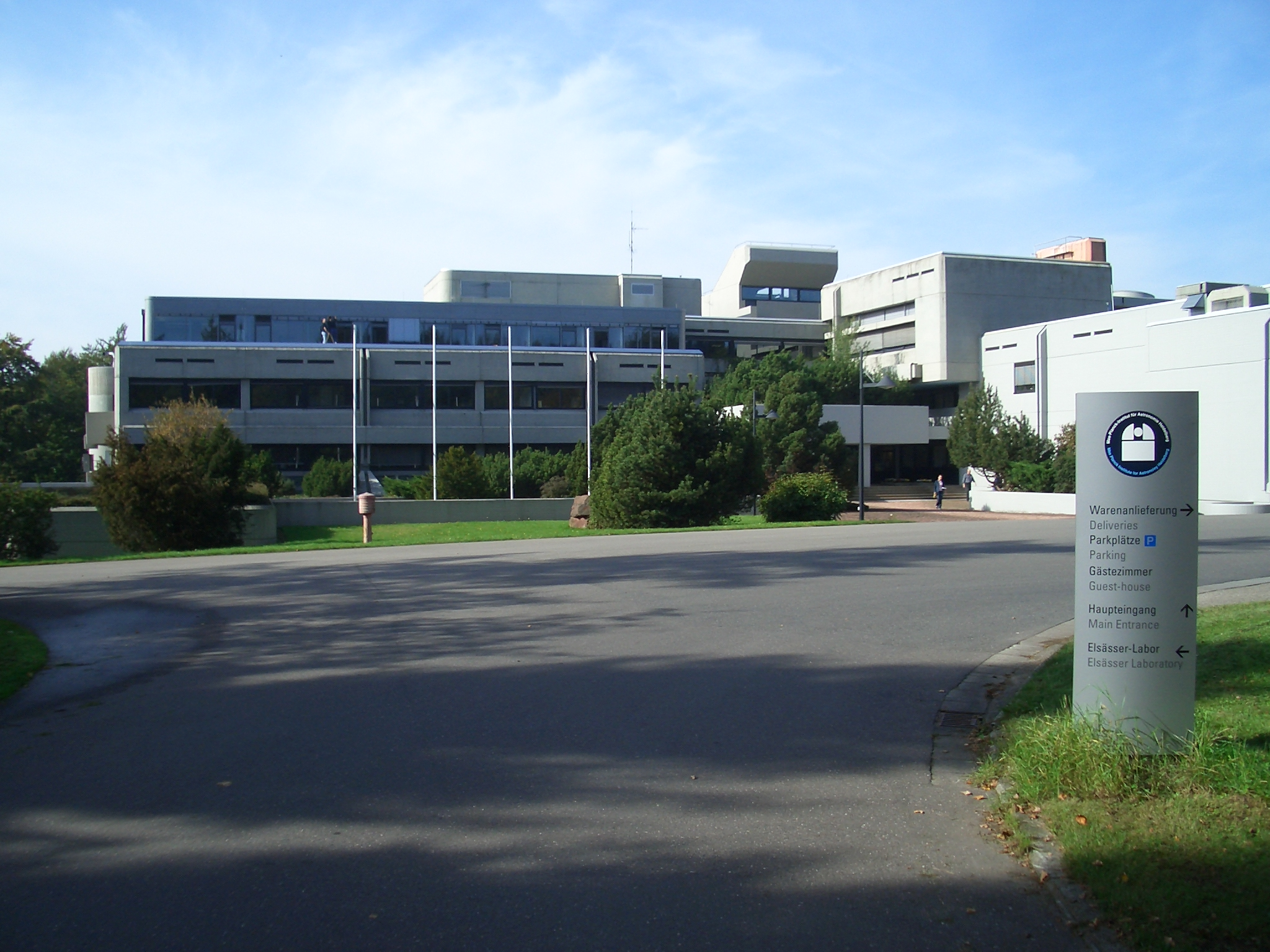
View on the MPIA building

The founding of the institute in 1967 resulted from the insight that a supra-regional institute equipped with powerful telescopes was necessary in order to conduct internationally competitive astronomical research. Hans Elsässer, an astronomer, became the founding director in 1968. In February 1969, a first group of 5 employees started work in the buildings of the neighbouring Königstuhl State Observatory. The institute, which was completed in 1975, was initially dedicated to the preparation and evaluation of astronomical observations and the development of new measurement methods.

From 1973 to 1984, it operated the Calar Alto Observatory on Calar Alto near Almería together with Spanish authorities. This largest observatory on the European mainland was used equally by astronomers from both countries until 2019. On 23 May 2019, the regional government of Andalusia and the MPG signed a transfer agreement for the 50% share in the observatory. Since then, it has been owned exclusively by Spain.

Since 2005, the MPIA has been operating the Large Binocular Telescope (LBT) together with partners from Germany, Italy, and the US and equipping it with measuring instruments. The LBT is located on Mount Graham near Tucson, Arizona, which is 3190 m high. On its mount, it carries two primary mirrors, each 8.4 meters in diameter, making it the largest optical reflecting telescope with single monolithic primary mirrors in the world.

Additionally, MPIA is participating in providing with instruments and using of the Very Large Telescope (VLT) operated by ESO (European Southern Observatories). With the assistance of the MPIA two of VLT's 8-meter mirrors were linked together in such way that they could work as a bigger telescope with higher resolution in autumn 2002.

In 2022, MPIA was taking part in the preparatory work for installing in the Extremely Large Telescope (ELT) in Chile with a 39-meter mirror (the largest telescope in the world).

== Research interests ==
Three scientific questions are given priority at the MPIA. One is the formation and development of stars and planets in our cosmic neighborhood. The resonating question is: Is the Sun with its inhabited planet Earth unique, or are there also conditions in the vicinity of other stars, at least the numerous sun-like ones among them, that are conducive to life? In some aspect related to those topics, the APEx department studies exoplanets and aims to decipher their atmospheres by observation and modelling. On the other hand, the area of galaxies and cosmology is about understanding the development of today's richly structured Universe with its galaxies and stars and its emergence from the simple initial state after the Big Bang.

The research topics at a glance:

- Star formation and young objects, planet formation, astrobiology, interstellar matter, astrochemistry
- Structure and evolution of the Milky Way, quasars and active galaxies, evolution of galaxies, galaxy clusters, cosmology
- Atmospheric Physics of Exoplanets

Along with the Center for Astronomy at the University of Heidelberg, the Heidelberg Institute for Theoretical Studies (HITS) and the Department of Astronomy and Particle Physics of the MPI for Nuclear Physics (MPIK), the MPIA in Heidelberg is a globally recognized center of astronomical research.

Since 2015, the MPIA has been running the "Heidelberg Initiative for the Origins of Life" (HIFOL) together with the MPIK, the HITS, the Institute of Geosciences at Heidelberg University and the Department of Chemistry at LMU Munich. HIFOL brings together top researchers from astrophysics, geosciences, chemistry and the life sciences to promote, strengthen and combine scientific research towards the prerequisites for the emergence of life.

== Instrumentation ==
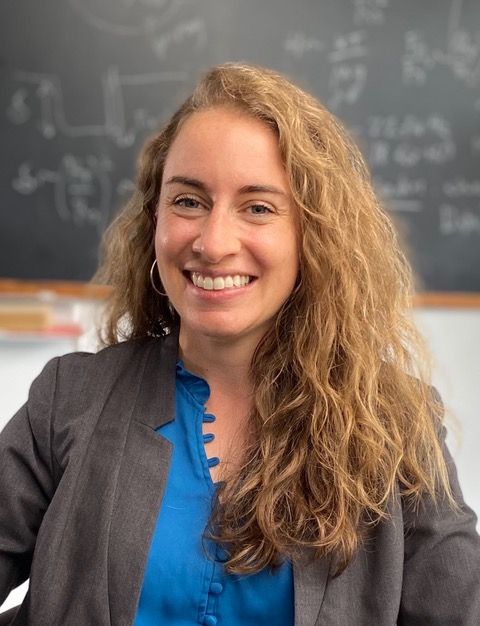
Managing director and APEx department director Laura Kreidberg (2020)

The MPIA also builds instruments or parts of them for ground-based telescopes and satellites, including the following:

- CARMENES (a high-resolution radial velocity machine) at Calar Alto Observatory (Spain)
- La Silla Observatory of the European Southern Observatory (ESO)
- GRAVITY and MATISSE instruments for the VLT at Paranal Observatory
- MICADO and METIS for the ELT (ESO)
- LINC-NIRVANA instrument for the Large Binocular Telescope
- Infrared Space Observatory (ESA)
- Herschel Space Observatory (ESA, NASA)
- James Webb Space Telescope (NASA, ESA)
- Euclid Space Telescope (ESA)
- Nancy Grace Roman Space Telescope (NASA)

The MPIA is also participating in the Gaia mission. Gaia is a space mission of the European Space Agency (ESA), in which the exact positions, distances and velocities of around one billion Milky Way stars are determined.

== Directors ==
- Hans Elsässer, Founding director, 1968–1997
- Guido Münch, 1978–1989
- Steven Beckwith, 1991–2001
- Immo Appenzeller, 1998–2000 (interim)
- Hans-Walter Rix, since 1999
- Thomas Henning, 2001–2024
- Laura Kreidberg, since 2020
- Myriam Benisty, since 2024

== Infrastructure ==
The managing director is Laura Kreidberg (as of January 2024). Former and current external scientific members of the MPIA were and are:

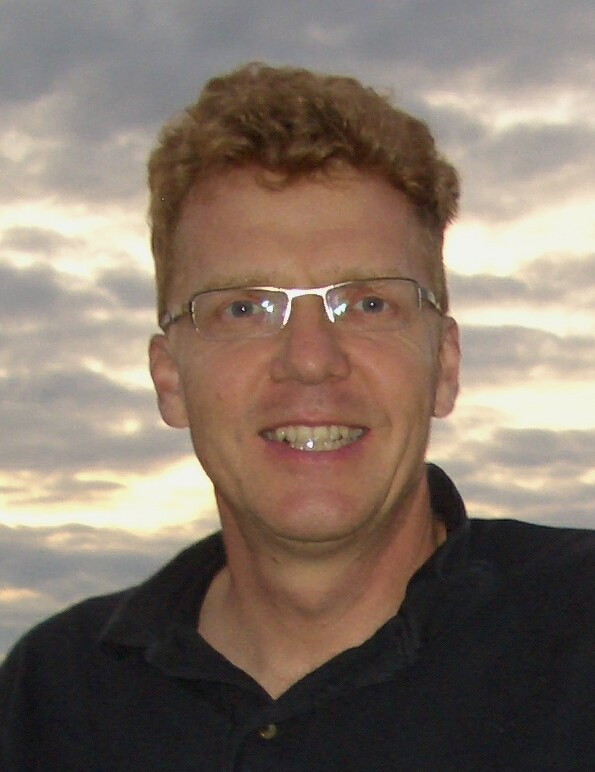
GC department director Hans-Walter Rix (2009)

- Karl-Heinz Böhm (†)
- Walter Fricke (†)
- George Herbig (†)
- Conny Aerts (University of Leuven/Radboud University Nijmegen)
- Immo Appenzeller (Emeritus, Heidelberg University)
- Steven V.W. Beckwith (University of California, Berkeley)
- Willy Benz (University of Bern)
- Rafael Rebolo López (Instituto de Astrofísica de Canarias)
- Volker Springel (Max Planck Institute for Astrophysics)

At the end of 2021, a total of 392 people were employed at the institute, including 190 scientists, among them 95 junior and visiting scientists. In the same year, 52 doctoral students were supervised in cooperation with the University of Heidelberg. Nine independent research groups have been established at the MPIA per 2021. These include three Max Planck Research Groups, two Lise Meitner Groups, and two European research groups. Two groups are funded by the Alexander von Humboldt Foundation.

== Graduate program ==
The MPIA participates in the International Max Planck Research School (IMPRS) for Astronomy and Cosmic Physics. The IMPRS is an English-language doctoral program that started in 2005. Other partners of the IMPRS are the MPIK, the Center for Astronomy at the University of Heidelberg and the HITS. Since 2007, the IMPRS has been part of the Heidelberg Graduate School of Fundamental Physics. Spokespersons of the IMPRS are Hans-Walter Rix from MPIA and Stefan Wagner from the Landessternwarte Heidelberg.

== Public relations and outreach ==
The MPIA hosts the editorial office of the popular journal Sterne und Weltraum (lit. Stars and Space), which was founded in 1962 by Hans Elsässer, later founding director of the MPIA, among others. It is also the patron of the Wissenschaft in die Schulen! (lit. Science into Schools) initiative, which develops educational materials for secondary schools. In December 2008, the institute and the Klaus Tschira Foundation announced their intention to bundle the activities of the Heidelberg astronomers in public relations and work with pupils and teachers in a newly founded Haus der Astronomie.

Every few years, the MPIA hosts an Open Day for the general public. On the event, visitors can interact in English with the institute's experts and attend brief seminars in which they are introduced to the institute's astronomical research and instruments.

== Haus der Astronomie ==
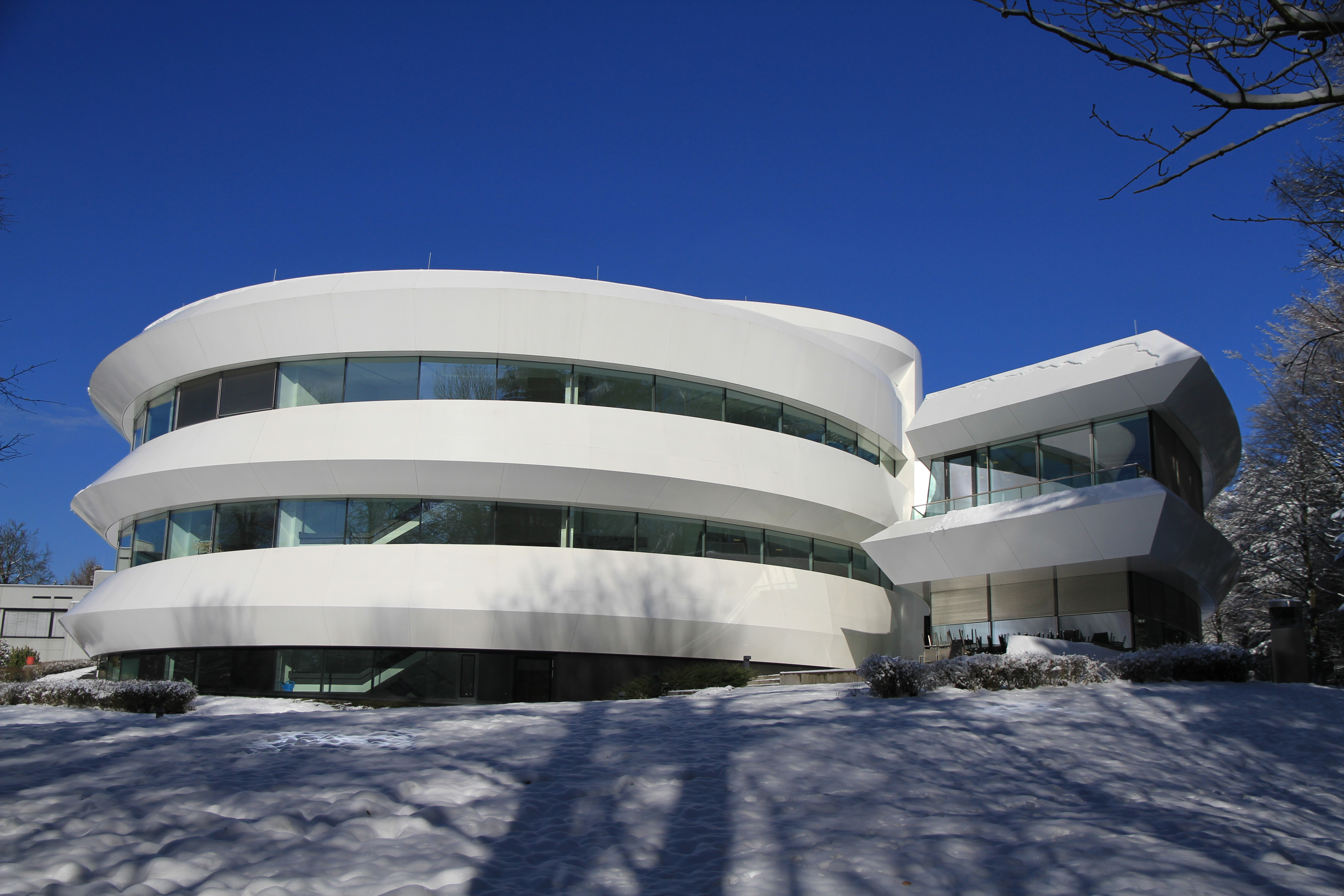
Haus der Astronomie in early 2018

In 2009, "Haus der Astronomie", a center for astronomy education and outreach was founded on the MPIA campus. The center is a partnership between the Max Planck Society, the Klaus Tschira Foundation, Heidelberg University and the City of Heidelberg. The center's galaxy-shaped building, funded and constructed by the Klaus Tschira Foundation, was opened in December 2011. It is operated by the Max Planck Society, which has delegated the task to the Max Planck Institute for Astronomy.

Activities in Haus der Astronomie include public talks and guided tours, planetarium shows, workshops for school classes or kindergarten groups, the development of educational materials, pre-service training for teacher students at Heidelberg University and in-service training for German and international teachers.

Every year, Haus der Astronomie offers International Summer Internship Program for students in their senior year of high school and recent graduates. During the program participants can engage in astrophysical activities like experiments and observation.
