= Ibn Taghribirdi =

Muslim Mamluk historian (1411–1470)

- ابن تغري بردي
- Born: Jamal al-Din Ibn Yusuf; 2 February 1411; Cairo, Mamluk Sultanate (modern-day Egypt)
- Died: 5 June 1470 (aged 59); Cairo, Mamluk Sultanate
- Resting place: Cairo, Egypt
- Occupation: Historian
- Writing career
- Years active: circa 1435–1470
- Notable works: Al-Nujum al-zahira fi muluk Misr wa'l-Qahira النجوم الزاھرۃ فی ملوک مصر والقاھرۃ

Jamal al-Din Yusuf bin al-Amir Sayf al-Din Taghribirdi (Arabic: جمال الدين يوسف بن الأمير سيف الدين تغري بردي), or Abū al-Maḥāsin Yūsuf ibn Taghrī-Birdī, or Ibn Taghribirdi (2 February 1411— 5 June 1470; 813–874 Hijri) was an Islamic historian born in the 15th century in Mamluk Egypt. He studied under al-Ayni and al-Maqrizi, two of the leading Cairene historians and scholars of the day.

Ibn Taghribirdi's most famous work is a multi-volume chronicle of Egypt and the Mamluk sultanate called al-Nujum al-zahira fi muluk Misr wa'l-Qahira. His style is annalistic and gives precise dates for most events; this format makes it clear that Ibn Taghribirdi had privileged access to the sultans and their records. The name "Taghribirdi" is cognate to modern Turkish "Tanrıverdi" and means god-given in Turkic languages.

== Works ==
- Al-Nujūm al-Zāhirah fī Mulūk Miṣr wa-al-Qāhirah (النجوم الزاهرة في ملوك مصر والقاهرة). Chronicle of period from the Islamic conquest of Egypt in 641 to 1468.
  - Edited by William Popper. 12. vols. Cairo, Dār al-Kutub al-Miṣrīyah, 1929–56.
  - Miṣr al-Jadīdah, al-Qāhirah, al-Maktab al-ʻArabī lil-Maʻārif (Arabic: المكتب العربي للمعارف), 2017.
- al-Manhal al-ṣāfī wa-al-mustawfá baʻda al-wāfī (المنهل الصافي والمستوفي بعد الوافي); 13-vol. biographical dictionary with approx. 3000 entries celebrating the lives of sultans, princes (amirs), scholars and scientists (ulama), dignitaries, and entertainers, from the Bahri dynasty and later.
- Ḥawādith al-duhūr fī madá al-ayyām wa-al-shuhūr (حوادث الدهور في مدى الأيام والشهور); Egypt history 1250–1517 continues al-Maqrizi's Suluk li-ma'rifat duwwal al-muluk.
- Al-Baḥr al-zākhir fī tārīkh al-ʻālam wa-akhbār al-awāʼil wa-al-awākhir (البحر الزاخر في تاريخ العالم وأخبار الأوائل والأواخر); universal history from creation of Adam (National Library of Paris, No.1551); Iraq MS purchased by Dar al-Kutub, Egypt.
- Mawrid al-laṭāfah fī man waliya al-salṭanah wa-al-khilāfah (مورد اللطافة في من وليه السلطنة والخلافة); Biographies of the sultans and the caliphs.

== Bibliography ==
- History of Egypt 1382–1469; transl. from the Arabic Annals of Abu l-Maḥāsin Ibn Taghrī Birdī by William Popper, Berkeley 1954–63.

== See also ==
- List of Muslim historians
