= Zacharias III of Makuria =

Zacharias III
- Augustus

King of Makuria
- Reign: c. 820–856 (disputed)
- Predecessor: Ioannes
- Successor: Georgios I
- Born: c. 795; Dongola
- Died: c. 856
- Issue: Georgios I Kosma; Ioannes
- Father: Ioannes
- Religion: Coptic Orthodox Christianity

Zacharias III (Old Nubian: ⲍⲁⲭⲁⲣⲓⲁⲥ, Zakharias; Byzantine Greek: Ζαχαρίας, Zakharías; Arabic: Zakarya ibn-Bahnas) (c. 795 – c. 856) was a ruler of the Nubian kingdom of Makuria.

== Life ==
Zacharias was born around 795 in Dongola, probably the son of the nobleman Ioannes and an anonymous woman of the Makurian royal family. (Note: Another tradition holds that Zacharias was the brother-in-law of Ioannes. According to Michael the Syrian, Zacharias married Ioannes' unnamed daughter to Georgios. Nevertheless, it is certain that Zacharias not a part of Makuria's traditional matrilineal line of succession.) Ioannes ascended to the Dongolan throne around 800, however it was Makurian tradition for the crown to pass from the king to his sororal nephew. Through unknown means, Zacharias was able to his succeed his father in the 820s when he ascended to the throne of Dongola and took the Roman imperial title of Augustus (Byzantine Greek: αὔγουστος, augoustos). (Note: Recorded in a posthumous inscription dated to 883 (DBMNT 15).)

=== Reign ===
Zacharias initially exploited the ongoing chaos of the Fourth Fitna (811–813/837) by continuing his predecessors' policy (Note: According to the History of the Patriarchs of Alexandria, the Makurians had last paid the baqt in 820, but the kings had broken the baqt intermittently since the reign of the Caliph al-Mahdi (r. 773–785).) of refusing to send the annual baqt tribute of slaves to Umayyad Egypt but intermittent invasions from the Abbasids had made the situation untenable and open rebellion had erupted against Zacharias. In 834, the new caliph al-Mu'tasim (833-842) attempted to re-impose the baqt by threatening war unless the missing fourteen years worth of tribute were paid in full. The Patriarch of Alexandria Joseph I, wishing to mediate peace between the two, sent his own letter to Zacharias advising him to obey the caliph. With rebellions confining Zacharias to Dongola, the king knew it would be near-impossible to gather the required 5,000 slaves (Note: The baqt required 400 slaves annually) and in 835 sent his 20-year old son Georgios I to Baghdad as an envoy. Before he left, Zacharias proclaimed Georgios as his heir and may have bestowed upon him the title of caesar (καῖσαρ, kaîsar). (Note: Recorded in a posthumous inscription dated to 887 (DBMNT 12). In the Roman and early Byzantine tradition, the senior emperor had the title of Augustus and the heir the title of Caesar. As Georgios's title is still used after his own reign, it suggests that the Makurian heir to the throne did not necessarily assume the title of Augustus upon his accession to sole rule.) Georgios, aided by Joseph, was successful in his mission and al-Mu'tasim reduced the baqt payment to once every three years. After Georgios's triumphant return to Dongola in early 837, Zacharias rebuilt the Great Church of Jesus in gratitude for his son's safe return. Zacharias ruled with his son for the rest of his reign.

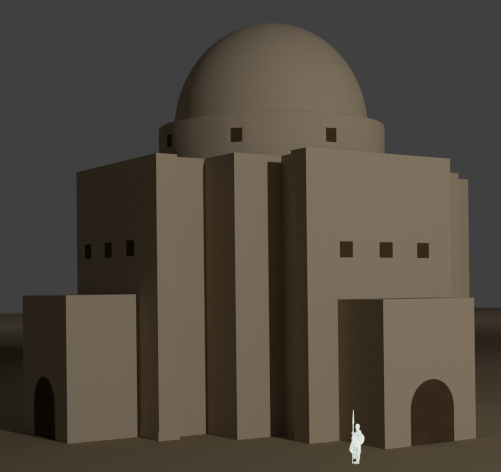
Reconstruction of the 9th century "Cruciform Church" of Dongola. It was the largest church in the kingdom, measuring c. 28 x 37,3 x 34,8m. It served as a source of inspiration not only for many Nubian, but even Ethiopian churches like the famous rock–hewn churches of Lalibela.

=== Death and Succession ===
Little else is known of Zacharias's life. As Georgios I was reigning alone in the 850s, Zacharias likely died in the first half of the decade.

== Family ==
Zacharias had three known children :

- Georgios I of Makuria (815–887), caesar during his father's reign.
- Princess Kosma (c. 820–a. 840), whose son Niuty was Georgios' heir before a failed rebellion.
- Ioannes (827–883), protomeizoteros and eparch of Gadera during Georgios' reign.

== Bibliography ==
- Al-Maqrizi. Book of Exhortations and Useful Lessons in Dealing with Topography and Historical Remains trans. K. Stowasser. Liege 2022.
- Severus ibn al-Muqaffa. History of the Patriarchs of Alexandria trans. B. Evetts, History of the Patriarchs of the Coptic Church of Alexandria III. 1910 ( Patrologia Orientalis 5)
- Fritsch, Emmanuel (2018). "The Origins and Meanings of the Ethiopian Circular Church". In Robin Griffith-Jones, Eric Fernie (ed.). Tomb and Temple. Re-Imagining the Sacred Buildings of Jerusalem. Boydell. pp. 267–296. ISBN 9781783272808.
- Godlewski, Włodzimierz (2013b). Dongola-ancient Tungul. Archaeological guide (PDF). Polish Centre of Mediterranean Archaeology, University of Warsaw. ISBN 978-83-903796-6-1.
- Łajtar, Adam. (2003). Catalogue of the Greek Inscriptions in the Sudan National Museum at Khartoum. Peeters, Leuven (Orientalia Lovaniensia Analecta 122).
- Łajtar, Adam and Ochała, Grzegorz. "A Christian King in Africa: The Image of Christian Nubian Rulers in Internal and External Sources," in P. Forness, A. Hasse-Ungeheuer and H. Leppin (eds.) The Good Christian Ruler in the First Millenium: Views from the Wider Mediterranean World in Conversation (2021). De Gruyter (Millenium Studies 92).
- Welsby, Derek A. (2002). The Medieval Kingdoms of Nubia, British Museum Press, London. ISBN 0-7141-1947-4
- Werner, Roland (2013). Das Christentum in Nubien: Geschichte und Gestalt einer afrikanischen Kirche. (Studien zur Orientalischen Kirchengeschichte 48)
- Zurawski, B. (2021). "Christian and Islamic Nubia, 543–1820," Oxford Research Encyclopedia of African History.

Preceded by Johannes	King of Makuria	Succeeded by Georgios I
