= Immo Appenzeller =

German astronomer (born 1940)

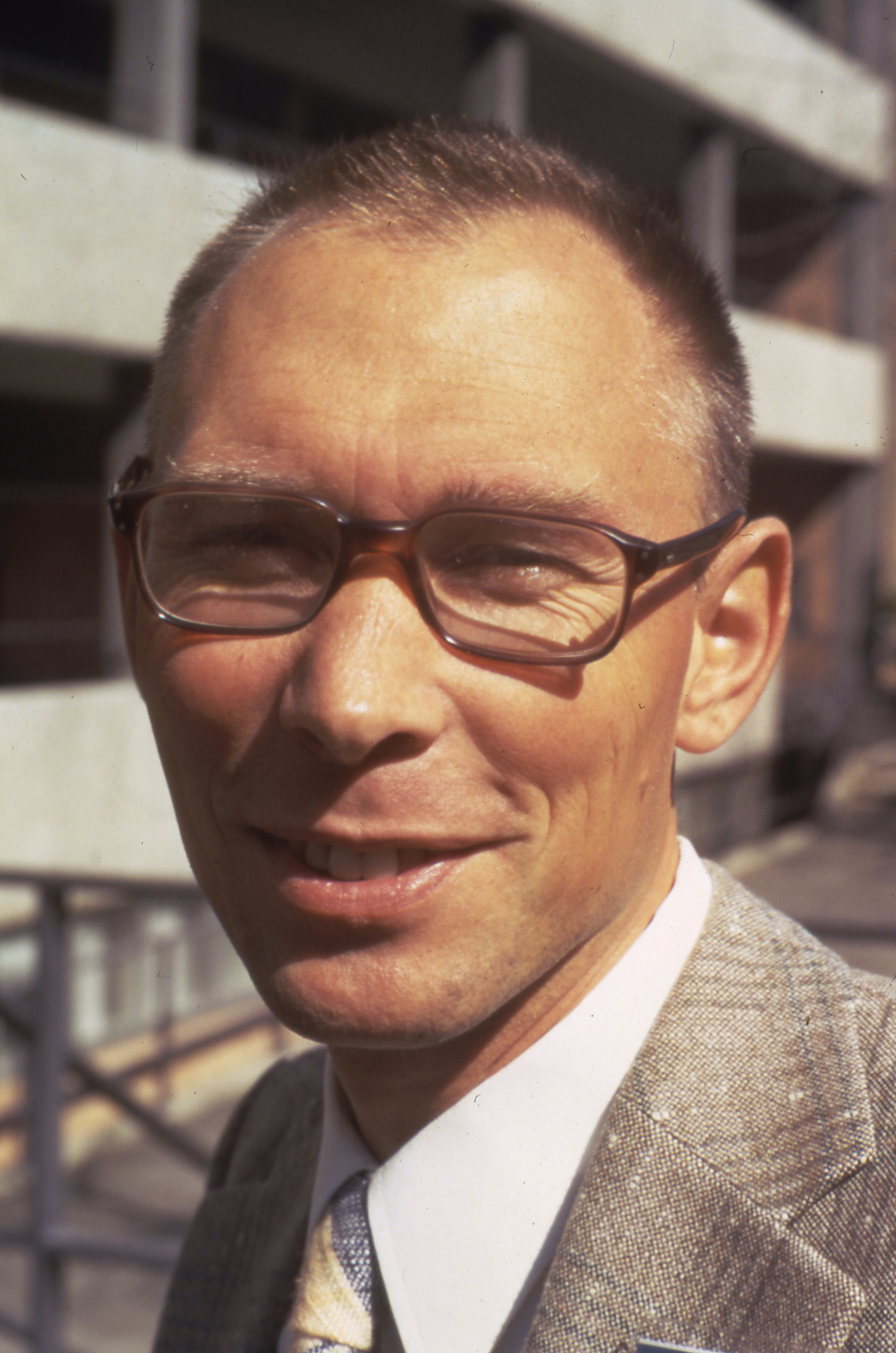
- Appenzeller in 1973
- Occupations: Astronomer, professor of astrophysics

Academic background
- Education: Georg-August University in Göttingen

Academic work
- Discipline: Astrophysicist
- Institutions: Heidelberg university

Immo Appenzeller (born May 13, 1940 in Urach, Württemberg) is a German astronomer.

== Career ==
Appenzeller studied physics at the University of Tübingen from 1959 on. In 1961 he moved to Göttingen to study physics and astronomy at the University of Göttingen. He received his doctorate in 1966 with a thesis entitled Investigation of the structure of the galactic magnetic field in Cygnus and Orion using polarization measurements of starlight supervised by Alfred Behr.

From 1964 to 1966 Appenzeller was research assistant at the Yerkes Observatory of the University of Chicago, and in 1967 he was appointed as an assistant at the Göttingen university observatory. After his habilitation in 1970 he became a private lecturer at the Göttinger university observatory. In 1972 he was a guest professor at the University of Tokyo, and in 1974 he was promoted to adjunct professor.

In 1975 he was named director of the state observatory Heidelberg-Königstuhl state observatory and full professor of astronomy at the University of Heidelberg. In 1982/83 he was invited as guest scientist at the University of Arizona. In 1985/86 he served as Dean of the Faculty of Physics and Astronomy in Heidelberg. From 1998 to 2000 he was also acting director of the Max Planck Institute for Astronomy. He retired in 2005.

Appenzeller supervised the doctoral theses of about twenty students, about a third of which continued working in astronomy.

== Research ==
Appenzeller conducted both observational and theoretical research and was also active in developing astronomical instruments. He was in particular project manager for the FORS instrument of the Very Large Telescope at ESO (European Southern Observatory) in Chile. He made significant contributions to several research fields, including star formation, stellar evolution, high redshift galaxies, active galaxies and quasars, massive luminous stars, and cosmic X-ray sources.

== Honors ==
Appenzeller is an "External Scientific Member" of the Max Planck Institute for Astronomy in Heidelberg. He is a member of the Heidelberg Academy of Sciences. From 1994 to 1997 he was Secretary General of the International Astronomical Union. In 2002 he received the Gay Lussac Humboldt Prize. In 1991, the asteroid (2373) Immo was named after him. In 2015 he was awarded the Karl Schwarzschild Medal for his outstanding contributions to astronomy.

== Selected publications ==
The first selection criterion for bibliographic references quoted in this section is the number of normalized citations, i.e., the total number of citations divided by the number of authors of the publication, as given by the Astrophysics Data System at the date of writing. Furthermore, only one reference is kept for each research subfield.

- Appenzeller, I. and Mundt, R., “T Tauri stars”, Astronomy and Astrophysics Review, 1, 291–334, 1989
- Appenzeller, I., “The evolution of a vibrationally unstable main-sequence star of 130 M sun.”, Astronomy & Astrophysics, 5, 355, 1970
- Bouvier, J. and Appenzeller, I., “A magnitude-limited spectroscopic and photometric survey of rho Ophiuchus X-ray sources.”, Astronomy & Astrophysics Supplement Series, 92, 481–516, 1992
- Appenzeller, I., “Polarimetric Observations of Nearby Stars in the Directions of the Galactic Poles and the Galactic Plane”, The Astrophysical Journal, 151, 907, 1968. doi:10.1086/149492
- Zickgraf, F. J., Wolf, B., Stahl, O., Leitherer, C., and Appenzeller, I., “B(e)-supergiants of the Magellanic Clouds.”, Astronomy & Astrophysics, 163, 119–134, 1986

== Books ==
- High redshift galaxies - light from the early universe, Springer 2009
- Introduction to Astronomical Spectroscopy, Cambridge Verlag 2013
