= Hans Elsässer =

Hans Friedrich Elsässer (March 29, 1929 in Aalen – June 10, 2003 in Heidelberg) was a German astronomer and founding director of the Max Planck Institute for Astronomy in Heidelberg.

== Education and career ==
Elsässer studied astronomy, physics and mathematics at the University of Tübingen from 1948 to 1953, where he received his doctorate in 1953 under Heinrich Siedentopf and his habilitation in 1959. From 1953 to 1955 he worked at the High Altitude Research Stations on the Swiss Jungfraujoch and at the Boyden Observatory in Bloemfontein, South Africa. From 1955 to 1956, Elsässer was part of European Southern Observatory's visual expeditions in South Africa. He then worked as a research assistant, first in Tübingen, then at the university observatory in Göttingen. In 1962 he became a full professor of astronomy at the University of Heidelberg. He was also head of the Heidelberg-Königstuhl State Observatory until 1975.

Elsässer carried out various rocket and balloon experiments that were necessary for the successful implementation of the Helios A and B and Infrared Space Observatory (ISO) projects. He also researched in the areas of interstellar matter, star formation, active galaxies and large-scale structures in the cosmos.

In 1962, Elsässer founded the German language popular science magazine Sterne und Weltraum (Stars and Space) together with Karl Schaifers and Rudolf Kühn. Elsässer remained co-editor until his death. In the 1960s, telescopes were in short supply in Germany. Elsässer worked intensively to eliminate this deficiency. In 1968, Elsässer was founding director of the Max Planck Institute for Astronomy (MPIA) in Heidelberg, having been in contact with the Max Planck Society since 1964. Elsässer remained managing director of the MPIA until 1994. He retired in 1997.

== Honors and awards ==
In 1983, Elsässer was elected a member of the German National Academy of Sciences Leopoldina. Since 1972 he has been a full member of the Heidelberg Academy of Sciences.

In recognition of his achievements, the asteroid (4385) Elsässer was named after him.
