= Paola Caselli =

Italian astrochemist

Paola Caselli (born 26 July 1966) is an Italian astronomer and astrochemist known for her research on molecular clouds, star formation and planet formation, and the astrochemistry behind the materials found within the Solar System. She is the director of the Max Planck Institute for Extraterrestrial Physics near Munich in Germany. She also holds an honorary professorship at LMU Munich.

== Education and career ==
Caselli was born on 26 July 1966 in Follonica, Italy, and as a teenager was inspired to work in space science and molecular clouds by a teacher who gave her Fred Hoyle's 1957 science fiction novel The Black Cloud to read. She earned a laurea in astronomy and physics in 1990, from the University of Bologna, and completed her Ph.D. on Nonthermal broadening of molecular lines and chemical processes in star forming regions there in 1994.

After postdoctoral research at the Center for Astrophysics | Harvard & Smithsonian, she became a researcher at the Arcetri Observatory in Florence, Italy, in 1996, and remained there until 2005. For the next two years, she was a visiting scholar at the University of California, Berkeley and at Harvard University. In 2007 she became a professor of astronomy at the University of Leeds, and in 2011 became head of astrophysics at Leeds. She joined the Max Planck Institute for Extraterrestrial Physics as its director in 2014.

While continuing at the Max Planck Institute, she has also held temporary positions as Hasselblad Guest Professor at the Onsala Space Observatory in Sweden and as Blaauw Professor at the University of Groningen in the Netherlands.

== Recognition ==
Caselli was elected to Academia Europaea in 2025. She was also the 2025 recipient of the Karl Schwarzschild Medal of the Astronomische Gesellschaft.
