= David of Makuria =

David
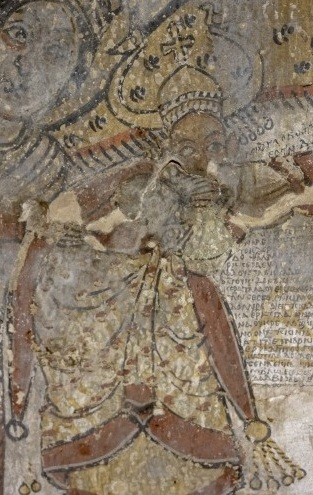
- Wall painting from Dongola possibly depicting King David

King of Makuria
- Reign: 1268 or 1269 – 4 June 1276
- Predecessor: Murtashkara
- Successor: Mashkouda
- Born: First half of the 13th century
- Died: After 1284
- Religion: Coptic Orthodox Christianity

David (Old Nubian: ⲇⲁ̄ⲇ, Dād) (Note: Overbars or overlines were generally used in Old Nubian to denote abbreviated spellings, particularly omission of the letter ⲓ (i). One attested Nubian form of the full name—from centuries earlier—was ⲇⲁⲩⲉⲓⲇ (Daueid).) was king of the Nubian kingdom of Makuria from 1268 or 1269 (AH 667) to 4 June 1276.

== Life ==
David was the son of an unknown father and Taslima, a sister of king Murtashkara. David came to power after deposing Murtashkara and expelling his sons to the Kingdom of al-Abwab in the south. Afterwards he attacked the Red Sea port of Aydhab and the Egyptian border town of Aswan in 1272 and 1275 respectively, ruled by the Mamluk Sultanate of Baybars. The attack on Aswan prompted Baybars to invade Makuria, depose David and install Mashkouda on the throne. As a consequence Makuria would become a Mamluk puppet state plagued by civil wars and Mamluk incursions for decades to come. David and his family were detained in Cairo in June 1276, where he remained captive until his death, presumably after 1284.

David is known from two legal documents found at Qasr Ibrim. In one of them his throne name appears as George Basil David (Georgiou Basileos Dād).

== Wall painting ==
In 2023, a Christian wall painting was discovered in Dongola, the capital of Makuria. It shows a king bowing to Christ, while to his left stands Archangel Michael. It is accompanied by an Old Nubian inscription that repeatedly mentions king David and his pleas to Christ to protect the city, likely the same David who attacked Aydhab and Aswan.

== See also ==
- List of rulers of Makuria
