= Marta Volonteri =

Italian astrophysicist (born 1974)

Marta Volonteri (born 1974) is an Italian astrophysicist known for her research on the formation and evolution of the supermassive black holes at the centers of galaxies. She is a director of research for the French National Centre for Scientific Research (CNRS), affiliated with the Institut d'Astrophysique de Paris, and (by special appointment) Professor of Black Hole Formation and Growth at the University of Amsterdam.

== Education and career ==
Volonteri was a student at the University of Milan, where she earned a laurea in physics (then the equivalent of a master's degree) in 1999, and completed a Ph.D. in 2003.

After postdoctoral research positions at the University of California, Santa Cruz from 2002 to 2004, and at the Institute of Astronomy, Cambridge from 2004 to 2006, she joined the University of Michigan as an assistant professor in 2007, and was tenured there as an associate professor in 2010. In 2012 she moved to her present position as a director of research for the CNRS.

She was named as Professor of Black Hole Formation and Growth, by special appointment, at the University of Amsterdam in 2019.

== Recognition ==
Volonteri received the CNRS Silver Medal in 2022, "for her studies of massive black holes located at the center of galaxies using numerical simulations". She was also the 2022 recipient of the Émilie Du Châtelet Prize of the Société Française de Physique.

In January 2026 Ms. Volonteri was nominated as one of the 18 new members of the very prestigious Académie des sciences

== Selected publications ==
- Volonteri, Marta; Haardt, Francesco; Madau, Piero (January 2003), "The assembly and merging history of supermassive black holes in hierarchical models of galaxy formation", The Astrophysical Journal, 582 (2): 559–573, arXiv:astro-ph/0207276, Bibcode:2003ApJ...582..559V, doi:10.1086/344675
- Volonteri, Marta; Madau, Piero; Quataert, Eliot; Rees, Martin J. (February 2005), "The distribution and cosmic evolution of massive black hole spins", The Astrophysical Journal, 620 (1): 69–77, arXiv:astro-ph/0410342, Bibcode:2005ApJ...620...69V, doi:10.1086/426858
- Volonteri, Marta; Rees, Martin J. (November 2005), "Rapid growth of high-redshift black holes", The Astrophysical Journal, 633 (2): 624–629, arXiv:astro-ph/0506040, Bibcode:2005ApJ...633..624V, doi:10.1086/466521
- Begelman, M. C.; Volonteri, M.; Rees, M. J. (July 2006), "Formation of supermassive black holes by direct collapse in pre-galactic haloes", Monthly Notices of the Royal Astronomical Society, 370 (1): 289–298, arXiv:astro-ph/0602363, Bibcode:2006MNRAS.370..289B, doi:10.1111/j.1365-2966.2006.10467.x
- Volonteri, Marta (April 2010), "Formation of supermassive black holes", The Astronomy and Astrophysics Review, 18 (3): 279–315, arXiv:1003.4404, Bibcode:2010A&ARv..18..279V, doi:10.1007/s00159-010-0029-x
- Reines, Amy E.; Volonteri, Marta (October 2015), "Relations between central black hole mass and total galaxy stellar mass in the local universe", The Astrophysical Journal, 813 (2) 82: 1–13, arXiv:1508.06274, Bibcode:2015ApJ...813...82R, doi:10.1088/0004-637x/813/2/82; corrigendum, 2019, doi:10.3847/1538-4357/ab26b9
