= Daniel M. Popper =

American astrophysicist (1913–1999)

- Born: August 17, 1913; Oakland, California
- Died: September 9, 1999 (aged 86)
- Education: University of California, Berkeley
- Awards: Karl Schwarzschild Medal (1984)
- Scientific career
- Fields: Astrophysics
- Thesis: (1938)
- Doctoral advisor: Arthur B. Wise

Daniel M. Popper (August 17, 1913 – September 9, 1999) was an American astrophysicist.

== Life and career ==
Popper was born in Oakland, California, the son of William Popper. He studied at the University of California, Berkeley where he received his Ph.D. in 1938. He joined the University of California, Los Angeles in 1947, becoming a full professor in 1955. He worked at UCLA until his retirement in 1978. Popper died in 1999.
