= Hans-Walter Rix =

German astronomer

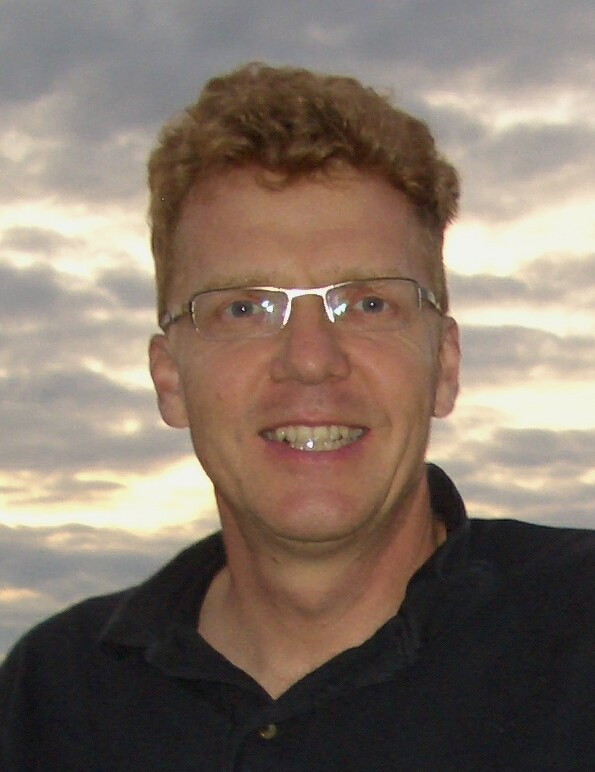
- Hans-Walter Rix (2009 photo)
- Born: January 16, 1964 (age 62); Erlangen, Germany
- Scientific career
- Fields: Physics, Astronomy
- Workplaces: Max Planck Institute for Astronomy
- Doctoral advisor: Simon White

Hans-Walter Rix is a German astronomer and director of the Max Planck Institute for Astronomy in Heidelberg. He is the son of the linguist Helmut Rix.

== Career ==
He was educated at the University of Freiburg, LMU Munich, and the University of Arizona, Tucson, where he received his Ph.D. in astronomy in 1991. He was Hubble Fellow at the Institute for Advanced Study in Princeton 1991–1994, then returned to the University of Arizona, and has been director of the Max Planck Institute for Astronomy in Heidelberg since 1999.

Rix has been working on the evolution of galaxies. His doctoral thesis was titled Disk Components in Early Type Galaxies, and he has, as of 2011, published 290 papers in peer-reviewed journals. He has made important contributions to the structure and dynamics of galaxies, to the evolution of galaxies since the early epochs of the Universe, and the formation of our own Milky Way and its satellites.

== Awards and honors ==
- Asteroid 200750 Rix, discovered by the Sloan Digital Sky Survey in 2001, was named in recognition for his contributions to the dynamics and evolution of galaxies. The official naming citation was published by the Minor Planet Center on 17 November 2013 (M.P.C. 85914).
