= Meanings of minor-planet names: 200001–201000 =

As minor planet discoveries are confirmed, they are given a permanent number by the IAU's Minor Planet Center (MPC), and the discoverers can then submit names for them, following the IAU's naming conventions. The list below concerns those minor planets in the specified number-range that have received names, and explains the meanings of those names.

Official naming citations of newly named small Solar System bodies are approved and published in a bulletin by IAU's Working Group for Small Bodies Nomenclature (WGSBN). Before May 2021, citations were published in MPC's Minor Planet Circulars for many decades. Recent citations can also be found on the JPL Small-Body Database (SBDB). Until his death in 2016, German astronomer Lutz D. Schmadel compiled these citations into the Dictionary of Minor Planet Names (DMP) and regularly updated the collection.

Based on Paul Herget's The Names of the Minor Planets, Schmadel also researched the unclear origin of numerous asteroids, most of which had been named prior to World War II. This article incorporates text from this source, which is in the public domain: SBDB New namings may only be added to this list below after official publication as the preannouncement of names is condemned. The WGSBN publishes a comprehensive guideline for the naming rules of non-cometary small Solar System bodies.

== 200001–200100 ==
Named minor planet	Provisional	This minor planet was named for...	Ref · Catalog
200002 Hehe	2007 JZ_{43}	"Hehe" ("harmony") is the name of Suzhou Hehe Culture Foundation. "Hehe" is a traditional Chinese symbol representing good marriage and loving family.	JPL · 200002
200003 Aokeda	2007 KP_{4}	Aokeda, the Chinese abbreviation for the Macau University of Science and Technology (Ao Men Ke Ji Da Xue) is the largest institution of higher education in Macau, China	JPL · 200003
200020 Cadi Ayyad	2007 NQ_{3}	The Cadi Ayyad University (UCA), one of the most important university in Morocco	JPL · 200020
200025 Cloud Gate	2007 OK_{10}	Cloud Gate Dance Theater of Taiwan, founded by choreographer Lin Hwai-min, is acclaimed as one of the finest contemporary dance companies in the world for its innovative works inspired by Asian cultures	JPL · 200025
200031 Romainmontaigut	2007 PQ_{43}	Romain Montaigut (born 1989) is a French amateur astronomer and active member of the CALA astronomy club. He is a leader in high-precision photometry, mainly for asteroids studies, and has discovered the binary nature of many asteroids.	JPL · 200031
200033 Newtaipei	2007 PX_{46}	New Taipei City is located in northern Taiwan and the most populous city of Taiwan. It surrounds the Taipei Basin and includes a substantial stretch of the island's northern coastline.	JPL · 200033
200052 Sinigaglia	2008 OO_{13}	Gianfranco Sinigaglia (1929–1990), Italian teacher of radioastronomy and applied electronics at the Physics Institute of Bologna University	JPL · 200052
200069 Alastor	4322 P-L	Alastor, a Greek hero, was leader of the Pylian contingent before Troy	JPL · 200069

== 200101–200200 ==
back to top

Named minor planet	Provisional	This minor planet was named for...	Ref · Catalog
There are no named minor planets in this number range

== 200201–200300 ==
back to top

Named minor planet	Provisional	This minor planet was named for...	Ref · Catalog
200234 Kumashiro	1999 VN_{8}	Masato Kumashiro (born 1989), a Japanese baseball player for the Saitama Seibu Lions.	JPL · 200234
200255 Weigle	1999 VT_{204}	Gerald Edwin Weigle II (born 1970) served as the Ralph Instrument Lead Engineer for the New Horizons Mission to Pluto.	JPL · 200255

== 200301–200400 ==
back to top

Named minor planet	Provisional	This minor planet was named for...	Ref · Catalog
There are no named minor planets in this number range

== 200401–200500 ==
back to top

Named minor planet	Provisional	This minor planet was named for...	Ref · Catalog
There are no named minor planets in this number range

== 200501–200600 ==
back to top

Named minor planet	Provisional	This minor planet was named for...	Ref · Catalog
200578 Yungchuen	2001 QW_{94}	Chuen Yung (1936–2014), a medical doctor in Hong Kong.	JPL · 200578

== 200601–200700 ==
back to top

Named minor planet	Provisional	This minor planet was named for...	Ref · Catalog
There are no named minor planets in this number range

== 200701–200800 ==
back to top

Named minor planet	Provisional	This minor planet was named for...	Ref · Catalog
200750 Rix	2001 VB_{128}	Hans-Walter Rix (born 1964), a German astrophysicist and director of the Max Planck Institute for Astronomy at Heidelberg who contributed to the Sloan Digital Sky Survey	JPL · 200750

== 200801–200900 ==
back to top

Named minor planet	Provisional	This minor planet was named for...	Ref · Catalog
There are no named minor planets in this number range

== 200901–201000 ==
back to top

Named minor planet	Provisional	This minor planet was named for...	Ref · Catalog
There are no named minor planets in this number range

back to top

Preceded by 199,001–200,000	Meanings of minor-planet names List of minor planets: 200,001–201,000	Succeeded by 201,001–202,000
