= List of minor planets: 200001–201000 =

The following is a partial list of minor planets, running from minor-planet number 200001 through 201000, inclusive. The primary data for this and other partial lists is based on JPL's "Small-Body Orbital Elements" and data available from the Minor Planet Center. Critical list information is also provided by the MPC, unless otherwise specified from Lowell Observatory. A detailed description of the table's columns and additional sources are given on the main page including a complete list of every page in this series, and a statistical break-up on the dynamical classification of minor planets.

Also see the summary list of all named bodies in numerical and alphabetical order, and the corresponding naming citations for the number range of this particular list. New namings may only be added to this list after official publication, as the preannouncement of names is condemned by the Working Group for Small Bodies Nomenclature of the International Astronomical Union.

Near-Earth obj.	MBA (inner)	MBA (outer)	Centaur
Mars-crosser	MBA (middle)	Jupiter trojan	Trans-Neptunian obj.
Unclassified

== 200001–200100 ==
Designation			Discovery			Properties		Ref
Permanent	Provisional	Named after	Date	Site	Discoverer(s)	Category	Diam.	Ref
200001	2007 JB_{42}	—	May 11, 2007	Catalina	CSS	·	7.5 km	MPC · JPL
200002 Hehe	2007 JZ_{43}	Hehe	May 6, 2007	XuYi	PMO NEO Survey Program	·	1.9 km	MPC · JPL
200003 Aokeda	2007 KP_{4}	Aokeda	May 19, 2007	XuYi	PMO NEO Survey Program	·	4.8 km	MPC · JPL
200004	2007 KY_{6}	—	May 23, 2007	Reedy Creek	J. Broughton	·	1.5 km	MPC · JPL
200005	2007 KT_{7}	—	May 16, 2007	Siding Spring	SSS	·	2.4 km	MPC · JPL
200006	2007 LG	—	June 6, 2007	Eskridge	Farpoint	·	2.0 km	MPC · JPL
200007	2007 LD_{3}	—	June 8, 2007	Catalina	CSS	·	2.0 km	MPC · JPL
200008	2007 LT_{4}	—	June 8, 2007	Kitt Peak	Spacewatch	·	4.2 km	MPC · JPL
200009	2007 LW_{4}	—	June 8, 2007	Kitt Peak	Spacewatch	NYS	1.4 km	MPC · JPL
200010	2007 LO_{7}	—	June 8, 2007	Catalina	CSS	·	2.9 km	MPC · JPL
200011	2007 LC_{9}	—	June 8, 2007	Catalina	CSS	·	2.6 km	MPC · JPL
200012	2007 LK_{20}	—	June 9, 2007	Kitt Peak	Spacewatch	NEM	2.8 km	MPC · JPL
200013	2007 LC_{29}	—	June 15, 2007	Kitt Peak	Spacewatch	·	5.3 km	MPC · JPL
200014	2007 MH_{3}	—	June 16, 2007	Kitt Peak	Spacewatch	·	1.7 km	MPC · JPL
200015	2007 MN_{5}	—	June 17, 2007	Kitt Peak	Spacewatch	·	4.0 km	MPC · JPL
200016	2007 MN_{11}	—	June 21, 2007	Mount Lemmon	Mount Lemmon Survey	·	4.9 km	MPC · JPL
200017	2007 MC_{12}	—	June 21, 2007	Mount Lemmon	Mount Lemmon Survey	KOR	1.7 km	MPC · JPL
200018	2007 MH_{16}	—	June 21, 2007	Anderson Mesa	LONEOS	·	2.1 km	MPC · JPL
200019	2007 MG_{25}	—	June 23, 2007	Kitt Peak	Spacewatch	·	4.0 km	MPC · JPL
200020 Cadi Ayyad	2007 NQ_{3}	Cadi Ayyad	July 14, 2007	Dauban	C. Rinner	URS	6.0 km	MPC · JPL
200021	2007 NZ_{6}	—	July 15, 2007	Siding Spring	SSS	·	4.8 km	MPC · JPL
200022	2007 OW_{5}	—	July 22, 2007	Lulin	LUSS	L4	17 km	MPC · JPL
200023	2007 OU_{6}	—	July 25, 2007	La Sagra	OAM	L4	16 km	MPC · JPL
200024	2007 OO_{7}	—	July 25, 2007	Dauban	Chante-Perdrix	L4 · ERY	14 km	MPC · JPL
200025 Cloud Gate	2007 OK_{10}	Cloud Gate	July 25, 2007	Lulin	Lin, C.-S., Q. Ye	·	4.7 km	MPC · JPL
200026	2007 PD_{2}	—	August 7, 2007	Eskridge	Farpoint	·	4.7 km	MPC · JPL
200027	2007 PM_{27}	—	August 14, 2007	Pla D'Arguines	R. Ferrando	L4	10 km	MPC · JPL
200028	2007 PW_{28}	—	August 12, 2007	Socorro	LINEAR	L4	17 km	MPC · JPL
200029	2007 PH_{37}	—	August 13, 2007	Socorro	LINEAR	L4	21 km	MPC · JPL
200030	2007 PD_{39}	—	August 13, 2007	Anderson Mesa	LONEOS	·	4.9 km	MPC · JPL
200031 Romainmontaigut	2007 PQ_{43}	Romainmontaigut	August 12, 2007	Eygalayes	Sogorb, P.	EOS	3.2 km	MPC · JPL
200032	2007 PU_{43}	—	August 12, 2007	Socorro	LINEAR	L4 · ERY · slow?	18 km	MPC · JPL
200033 Newtaipei	2007 PX_{46}	Newtaipei	August 6, 2007	Lulin	Lin, C.-S., Q. Ye	TIR	5.3 km	MPC · JPL
200034	2007 RG_{30}	—	September 5, 2007	Mount Lemmon	Mount Lemmon Survey	·	4.3 km	MPC · JPL
200035	2007 RZ_{71}	—	September 10, 2007	Kitt Peak	Spacewatch	L4	13 km	MPC · JPL
200036	2007 RH_{77}	—	September 10, 2007	Mount Lemmon	Mount Lemmon Survey	L4	10 km	MPC · JPL
200037	2007 RW_{105}	—	September 11, 2007	Catalina	CSS	L4	12 km	MPC · JPL
200038	2007 RZ_{130}	—	September 12, 2007	Mount Lemmon	Mount Lemmon Survey	KOR	1.8 km	MPC · JPL
200039	2007 RY_{156}	—	September 11, 2007	Mount Lemmon	Mount Lemmon Survey	CYB	5.1 km	MPC · JPL
200040	2007 RR_{162}	—	September 10, 2007	Kitt Peak	Spacewatch	3:2	7.6 km	MPC · JPL
200041	2007 RY_{216}	—	September 13, 2007	Anderson Mesa	LONEOS	·	2.5 km	MPC · JPL
200042	2007 TE_{32}	—	October 6, 2007	Kitt Peak	Spacewatch	L4	11 km	MPC · JPL
200043	2007 TU_{73}	—	October 13, 2007	Mayhill	Lowe, A.	T_{j} (2.99) · 3:2	7.3 km	MPC · JPL
200044	2007 TR_{291}	—	October 13, 2007	Mount Lemmon	Mount Lemmon Survey	·	2.8 km	MPC · JPL
200045	2007 TT_{326}	—	October 11, 2007	Kitt Peak	Spacewatch	MRX	1.8 km	MPC · JPL
200046	2007 TP_{371}	—	October 13, 2007	Catalina	CSS	L4	17 km	MPC · JPL
200047	2007 UB_{130}	—	October 17, 2007	Mount Lemmon	Mount Lemmon Survey	·	6.3 km	MPC · JPL
200048	2008 MQ_{3}	—	June 30, 2008	Kitt Peak	Spacewatch	·	1.1 km	MPC · JPL
200049	2008 NM_{2}	—	July 8, 2008	La Sagra	OAM	NYS	1.7 km	MPC · JPL
200050	2008 OL	—	July 25, 2008	Siding Spring	SSS	·	3.2 km	MPC · JPL
200051	2008 OE_{10}	—	July 28, 2008	Dauban	Chante-Perdrix	L4	10 km	MPC · JPL
200052 Sinigaglia	2008 OO_{13}	Sinigaglia	July 31, 2008	Skylive	Tozzi, F., G. Sostero	·	2.0 km	MPC · JPL
200053	2008 PK_{6}	—	August 2, 2008	Eygalayes	Sogorb, P.	·	1.2 km	MPC · JPL
200054	2008 PV_{8}	—	August 6, 2008	La Sagra	OAM	THM	3.8 km	MPC · JPL
200055	2008 PO_{9}	—	August 8, 2008	La Sagra	OAM	·	2.6 km	MPC · JPL
200056	2008 PB_{15}	—	August 10, 2008	La Sagra	OAM	EOS	2.2 km	MPC · JPL
200057	2008 PT_{16}	—	August 11, 2008	Črni Vrh	Skvarč, J.	L4	20 km	MPC · JPL
200058	2008 QA_{4}	—	August 24, 2008	Vicques	M. Ory	HOF	4.5 km	MPC · JPL
200059	2008 QZ_{7}	—	August 25, 2008	La Sagra	OAM	·	2.4 km	MPC · JPL
200060	2008 QD_{8}	—	August 25, 2008	La Sagra	OAM	NYS	1.4 km	MPC · JPL
200061	2008 QQ_{8}	—	August 25, 2008	La Sagra	OAM	EOS	4.4 km	MPC · JPL
200062	2008 QT_{16}	—	August 26, 2008	La Sagra	OAM	NYS	1.3 km	MPC · JPL
200063	2008 QX_{25}	—	August 24, 2008	La Sagra	OAM	·	1.2 km	MPC · JPL
200064	2008 RZ_{10}	—	September 3, 2008	Kitt Peak	Spacewatch	·	2.5 km	MPC · JPL
200065	2805 P-L	—	September 24, 1960	Palomar	C. J. van Houten, I. van Houten-Groeneveld, T. Gehrels	EOS	2.5 km	MPC · JPL
200066	2836 P-L	—	September 24, 1960	Palomar	C. J. van Houten, I. van Houten-Groeneveld, T. Gehrels	·	2.0 km	MPC · JPL
200067	4133 P-L	—	September 24, 1960	Palomar	C. J. van Houten, I. van Houten-Groeneveld, T. Gehrels	V	1.1 km	MPC · JPL
200068	4310 P-L	—	September 24, 1960	Palomar	C. J. van Houten, I. van Houten-Groeneveld, T. Gehrels	EMA	5.6 km	MPC · JPL
200069 Alastor	4322 P-L	Alastor	September 24, 1960	Palomar	C. J. van Houten, I. van Houten-Groeneveld, T. Gehrels	L4	12 km	MPC · JPL
200070	2090 T-1	—	March 25, 1971	Palomar	C. J. van Houten, I. van Houten-Groeneveld, T. Gehrels	·	2.2 km	MPC · JPL
200071	2051 T-2	—	September 29, 1973	Palomar	C. J. van Houten, I. van Houten-Groeneveld, T. Gehrels	·	2.2 km	MPC · JPL
200072	2132 T-2	—	September 29, 1973	Palomar	C. J. van Houten, I. van Houten-Groeneveld, T. Gehrels	·	5.7 km	MPC · JPL
200073	2190 T-2	—	September 29, 1973	Palomar	C. J. van Houten, I. van Houten-Groeneveld, T. Gehrels	·	1.2 km	MPC · JPL
200074	2194 T-2	—	September 29, 1973	Palomar	C. J. van Houten, I. van Houten-Groeneveld, T. Gehrels	·	2.4 km	MPC · JPL
200075	3119 T-2	—	September 30, 1973	Palomar	C. J. van Houten, I. van Houten-Groeneveld, T. Gehrels	·	1.5 km	MPC · JPL
200076	5009 T-2	—	September 25, 1973	Palomar	C. J. van Houten, I. van Houten-Groeneveld, T. Gehrels	EUN	1.9 km	MPC · JPL
200077	5134 T-2	—	September 25, 1973	Palomar	C. J. van Houten, I. van Houten-Groeneveld, T. Gehrels	·	2.8 km	MPC · JPL
200078	1028 T-3	—	October 17, 1977	Palomar	C. J. van Houten, I. van Houten-Groeneveld, T. Gehrels	·	3.3 km	MPC · JPL
200079	1138 T-3	—	October 17, 1977	Palomar	C. J. van Houten, I. van Houten-Groeneveld, T. Gehrels	·	4.6 km	MPC · JPL
200080	2436 T-3	—	October 16, 1977	Palomar	C. J. van Houten, I. van Houten-Groeneveld, T. Gehrels	·	2.0 km	MPC · JPL
200081	2674 T-3	—	October 11, 1977	Palomar	C. J. van Houten, I. van Houten-Groeneveld, T. Gehrels	NEM	3.3 km	MPC · JPL
200082	4022 T-3	—	October 16, 1977	Palomar	C. J. van Houten, I. van Houten-Groeneveld, T. Gehrels	·	5.5 km	MPC · JPL
200083	5037 T-3	—	October 16, 1977	Palomar	C. J. van Houten, I. van Houten-Groeneveld, T. Gehrels	·	4.4 km	MPC · JPL
200084	1981 EH_{29}	—	March 1, 1981	Siding Spring	S. J. Bus	·	2.1 km	MPC · JPL
200085	1991 RR_{19}	—	September 14, 1991	Palomar	H. E. Holt	(5)	1.7 km	MPC · JPL
200086	1992 QS_{2}	—	August 25, 1992	Palomar	Lowe, A.	·	4.4 km	MPC · JPL
200087	1992 SX_{4}	—	September 24, 1992	Kitt Peak	Spacewatch	NYS	2.1 km	MPC · JPL
200088	1993 BD_{12}	—	January 26, 1993	Kitt Peak	Spacewatch	·	3.5 km	MPC · JPL
200089	1993 FY_{9}	—	March 17, 1993	La Silla	UESAC	·	1.8 km	MPC · JPL
200090	1993 TH_{36}	—	October 11, 1993	La Silla	E. W. Elst	·	2.9 km	MPC · JPL
200091	1994 AD_{8}	—	January 8, 1994	Kitt Peak	Spacewatch	·	2.4 km	MPC · JPL
200092	1994 JE_{5}	—	May 4, 1994	Kitt Peak	Spacewatch	·	2.5 km	MPC · JPL
200093	1994 RJ_{26}	—	September 5, 1994	La Silla	E. W. Elst	·	940 m	MPC · JPL
200094	1994 SA_{12}	—	September 29, 1994	Kitt Peak	Spacewatch	HOF	3.3 km	MPC · JPL
200095	1994 SY_{12}	—	September 29, 1994	Kitt Peak	Spacewatch	·	950 m	MPC · JPL
200096	1994 TM_{8}	—	October 6, 1994	Kitt Peak	Spacewatch	HOF	3.5 km	MPC · JPL
200097	1994 UO_{6}	—	October 28, 1994	Kitt Peak	Spacewatch	·	2.4 km	MPC · JPL
200098	1995 BB_{5}	—	January 23, 1995	Kitt Peak	Spacewatch	MAS	790 m	MPC · JPL
200099	1995 DG_{14}	—	February 25, 1995	Kitt Peak	Spacewatch	·	3.3 km	MPC · JPL
200100	1995 HG_{5}	—	April 26, 1995	Kitt Peak	Spacewatch	LIX	7.6 km	MPC · JPL

== 200101–200200 ==
back to top

Designation			Discovery			Properties		Ref
Permanent	Provisional	Named after	Date	Site	Discoverer(s)	Category	Diam.	Ref
200101	1995 MJ_{7}	—	June 25, 1995	Kitt Peak	Spacewatch	VER	4.9 km	MPC · JPL
200102	1995 QH_{3}	—	August 31, 1995	Haleakala	AMOS	·	2.2 km	MPC · JPL
200103	1995 QP_{16}	—	August 28, 1995	Kitt Peak	Spacewatch	·	2.2 km	MPC · JPL
200104	1995 SD	—	September 16, 1995	Kleť	M. Tichý	(5)	2.2 km	MPC · JPL
200105	1995 SO_{24}	—	September 19, 1995	Kitt Peak	Spacewatch	·	1.5 km	MPC · JPL
200106	1995 SK_{67}	—	September 18, 1995	Kitt Peak	Spacewatch	·	1.5 km	MPC · JPL
200107	1995 SG_{78}	—	September 30, 1995	Kitt Peak	Spacewatch	·	2.1 km	MPC · JPL
200108	1995 UE_{39}	—	October 22, 1995	Kitt Peak	Spacewatch	·	1.5 km	MPC · JPL
200109	1995 UF_{43}	—	October 24, 1995	Kitt Peak	Spacewatch	·	1.8 km	MPC · JPL
200110	1995 UM_{50}	—	October 17, 1995	Kitt Peak	Spacewatch	·	1.6 km	MPC · JPL
200111	1995 UO_{56}	—	October 25, 1995	Kitt Peak	Spacewatch	·	810 m	MPC · JPL
200112	1995 UP_{57}	—	October 17, 1995	Kitt Peak	Spacewatch	·	1.7 km	MPC · JPL
200113	1995 UL_{69}	—	October 19, 1995	Kitt Peak	Spacewatch	·	810 m	MPC · JPL
200114	1995 VN_{15}	—	November 15, 1995	Kitt Peak	Spacewatch	·	2.2 km	MPC · JPL
200115	1995 WR_{13}	—	November 16, 1995	Kitt Peak	Spacewatch	·	1.5 km	MPC · JPL
200116	1996 AJ_{6}	—	January 12, 1996	Kitt Peak	Spacewatch	·	3.3 km	MPC · JPL
200117	1996 AU_{7}	—	January 12, 1996	Kitt Peak	Spacewatch	AGN	1.6 km	MPC · JPL
200118	1996 AG_{20}	—	January 15, 1996	Kitt Peak	Spacewatch	·	1.3 km	MPC · JPL
200119	1996 BD_{14}	—	January 16, 1996	Kitt Peak	Spacewatch	·	1.7 km	MPC · JPL
200120	1996 GQ_{13}	—	April 11, 1996	Kitt Peak	Spacewatch	·	2.6 km	MPC · JPL
200121	1996 TY_{15}	—	October 4, 1996	Kitt Peak	Spacewatch	TIR	4.4 km	MPC · JPL
200122	1997 CR_{6}	—	February 4, 1997	Haleakala	NEAT	·	3.7 km	MPC · JPL
200123	1997 EF_{60}	—	March 14, 1997	Kitt Peak	Spacewatch	WIT	1.5 km	MPC · JPL
200124	1997 GR_{2}	—	April 7, 1997	Kitt Peak	Spacewatch	DOR	4.5 km	MPC · JPL
200125	1997 HU	—	April 28, 1997	Kitt Peak	Spacewatch	·	1.9 km	MPC · JPL
200126	1997 HK_{11}	—	April 30, 1997	Socorro	LINEAR	·	2.7 km	MPC · JPL
200127	1997 MO	—	June 27, 1997	Kitt Peak	Spacewatch	·	3.0 km	MPC · JPL
200128	1997 SJ_{15}	—	September 29, 1997	Kitt Peak	Spacewatch	·	1.5 km	MPC · JPL
200129	1997 SZ_{30}	—	September 27, 1997	Costitx	Á. López J., R. Pacheco	·	4.4 km	MPC · JPL
200130	1997 TP_{9}	—	October 2, 1997	Kitt Peak	Spacewatch	MAS	650 m	MPC · JPL
200131	1997 UC_{6}	—	October 23, 1997	Kitt Peak	Spacewatch	V	760 m	MPC · JPL
200132	1997 WP_{11}	—	November 22, 1997	Kitt Peak	Spacewatch	·	1.7 km	MPC · JPL
200133	1997 WZ_{12}	—	November 23, 1997	Kitt Peak	Spacewatch	·	6.0 km	MPC · JPL
200134	1997 WN_{14}	—	November 22, 1997	Kitt Peak	Spacewatch	·	5.2 km	MPC · JPL
200135	1997 WO_{14}	—	November 22, 1997	Kitt Peak	Spacewatch	·	1.3 km	MPC · JPL
200136	1997 WS_{17}	—	November 23, 1997	Kitt Peak	Spacewatch	·	5.8 km	MPC · JPL
200137	1997 WV_{17}	—	November 23, 1997	Kitt Peak	Spacewatch	·	5.0 km	MPC · JPL
200138	1997 WP_{18}	—	November 23, 1997	Kitt Peak	Spacewatch	MAS	990 m	MPC · JPL
200139	1997 WS_{18}	—	November 23, 1997	Kitt Peak	Spacewatch	·	3.2 km	MPC · JPL
200140	1997 WH_{22}	—	November 28, 1997	Xinglong	SCAP	·	5.8 km	MPC · JPL
200141	1997 XZ_{1}	—	December 3, 1997	Chichibu	N. Satō	·	2.3 km	MPC · JPL
200142	1998 BC_{32}	—	January 23, 1998	Caussols	ODAS	·	2.0 km	MPC · JPL
200143	1998 DA_{9}	—	February 23, 1998	Kitt Peak	Spacewatch	·	2.0 km	MPC · JPL
200144	1998 DD_{21}	—	February 22, 1998	Kitt Peak	Spacewatch	·	1.3 km	MPC · JPL
200145	1998 DJ_{37}	—	February 28, 1998	La Silla	C.-I. Lagerkvist	·	2.1 km	MPC · JPL
200146	1998 FS_{136}	—	March 28, 1998	Socorro	LINEAR	·	2.7 km	MPC · JPL
200147	1998 HC_{50}	—	April 27, 1998	Kitt Peak	Spacewatch	NYS	1.8 km	MPC · JPL
200148	1998 HT_{143}	—	April 21, 1998	Socorro	LINEAR	·	1.4 km	MPC · JPL
200149	1998 HL_{147}	—	April 23, 1998	Socorro	LINEAR	·	3.6 km	MPC · JPL
200150	1998 LW_{3}	—	June 1, 1998	La Silla	E. W. Elst	PHO	2.0 km	MPC · JPL
200151	1998 QV_{59}	—	August 26, 1998	Kitt Peak	Spacewatch	·	2.2 km	MPC · JPL
200152	1998 QF_{64}	—	August 24, 1998	Socorro	LINEAR	·	4.3 km	MPC · JPL
200153	1998 QY_{70}	—	August 24, 1998	Socorro	LINEAR	·	4.1 km	MPC · JPL
200154	1998 RJ	—	September 1, 1998	Woomera	F. B. Zoltowski	·	1.1 km	MPC · JPL
200155	1998 RG_{20}	—	September 14, 1998	Socorro	LINEAR	·	3.1 km	MPC · JPL
200156	1998 SA_{3}	—	September 18, 1998	Goodricke-Pigott	R. A. Tucker	·	5.2 km	MPC · JPL
200157	1998 ST_{40}	—	September 24, 1998	Kitt Peak	Spacewatch	·	890 m	MPC · JPL
200158	1998 TK_{7}	—	October 15, 1998	Catalina	CSS	·	5.8 km	MPC · JPL
200159	1998 XY_{11}	—	December 14, 1998	Socorro	LINEAR	PHO	1.7 km	MPC · JPL
200160	1998 YN_{19}	—	December 25, 1998	Kitt Peak	Spacewatch	·	640 m	MPC · JPL
200161	1999 AG_{16}	—	January 9, 1999	Kitt Peak	Spacewatch	(1338) (FLO)	880 m	MPC · JPL
200162	1999 BZ_{12}	—	January 24, 1999	Višnjan	K. Korlević	·	6.7 km	MPC · JPL
200163	1999 CA_{7}	—	February 10, 1999	Socorro	LINEAR	PHO	1.6 km	MPC · JPL
200164	1999 CG_{114}	—	February 12, 1999	Socorro	LINEAR	·	870 m	MPC · JPL
200165	1999 CH_{144}	—	February 8, 1999	Mauna Kea	Veillet, C.	·	2.3 km	MPC · JPL
200166	1999 CB_{146}	—	February 8, 1999	Kitt Peak	Spacewatch	(43176) ·	5.0 km	MPC · JPL
200167	1999 CJ_{152}	—	February 12, 1999	Kitt Peak	Spacewatch	·	1.0 km	MPC · JPL
200168	1999 DG	—	February 16, 1999	Caussols	ODAS	·	4.7 km	MPC · JPL
200169	1999 FM_{3}	—	March 19, 1999	Socorro	LINEAR	PHO	2.2 km	MPC · JPL
200170	1999 FL_{51}	—	March 20, 1999	Socorro	LINEAR	·	4.4 km	MPC · JPL
200171	1999 FO_{61}	—	March 22, 1999	Anderson Mesa	LONEOS	·	1.8 km	MPC · JPL
200172	1999 FV_{79}	—	March 20, 1999	Apache Point	SDSS	·	1.6 km	MPC · JPL
200173	1999 GU_{13}	—	April 14, 1999	Kitt Peak	Spacewatch	THM	2.9 km	MPC · JPL
200174	1999 JV_{12}	—	May 14, 1999	Catalina	CSS	·	2.6 km	MPC · JPL
200175	1999 JH_{14}	—	May 13, 1999	Socorro	LINEAR	·	1.8 km	MPC · JPL
200176	1999 JR_{25}	—	May 10, 1999	Socorro	LINEAR	·	1.6 km	MPC · JPL
200177	1999 JY_{30}	—	May 10, 1999	Socorro	LINEAR	NYS	2.0 km	MPC · JPL
200178	1999 JD_{67}	—	May 12, 1999	Socorro	LINEAR	·	2.6 km	MPC · JPL
200179	1999 JH_{119}	—	May 13, 1999	Socorro	LINEAR	·	2.3 km	MPC · JPL
200180	1999 JU_{127}	—	May 13, 1999	Socorro	LINEAR	·	3.7 km	MPC · JPL
200181	1999 KQ_{3}	—	May 19, 1999	Kitt Peak	Spacewatch	MAS	950 m	MPC · JPL
200182	1999 OT_{3}	—	July 22, 1999	Socorro	LINEAR	·	930 m	MPC · JPL
200183	1999 RO	—	September 3, 1999	Ondřejov	L. Kotková	·	2.8 km	MPC · JPL
200184	1999 RY_{8}	—	September 4, 1999	Kitt Peak	Spacewatch	·	5.6 km	MPC · JPL
200185	1999 RQ_{65}	—	September 7, 1999	Socorro	LINEAR	EUN	1.9 km	MPC · JPL
200186	1999 RY_{72}	—	September 7, 1999	Socorro	LINEAR	·	1.5 km	MPC · JPL
200187	1999 RZ_{90}	—	September 7, 1999	Socorro	LINEAR	·	2.7 km	MPC · JPL
200188	1999 RL_{93}	—	September 7, 1999	Socorro	LINEAR	·	2.7 km	MPC · JPL
200189	1999 RX_{100}	—	September 8, 1999	Socorro	LINEAR	·	2.2 km	MPC · JPL
200190	1999 RO_{101}	—	September 8, 1999	Socorro	LINEAR	·	3.3 km	MPC · JPL
200191	1999 RM_{110}	—	September 8, 1999	Socorro	LINEAR	·	3.2 km	MPC · JPL
200192	1999 RT_{119}	—	September 9, 1999	Socorro	LINEAR	(5)	2.5 km	MPC · JPL
200193	1999 RP_{135}	—	September 9, 1999	Socorro	LINEAR	·	2.9 km	MPC · JPL
200194	1999 RP_{144}	—	September 9, 1999	Socorro	LINEAR	·	3.6 km	MPC · JPL
200195	1999 RC_{188}	—	September 14, 1999	Kitt Peak	Spacewatch	NYS	1.8 km	MPC · JPL
200196	1999 RT_{190}	—	September 14, 1999	Kitt Peak	Spacewatch	·	2.4 km	MPC · JPL
200197	1999 RA_{203}	—	September 8, 1999	Socorro	LINEAR	EUN	2.0 km	MPC · JPL
200198	1999 RE_{216}	—	September 2, 1999	Kitt Peak	B. Gladman	·	1.9 km	MPC · JPL
200199	1999 RT_{221}	—	September 5, 1999	Catalina	CSS	·	2.2 km	MPC · JPL
200200	1999 RY_{234}	—	September 8, 1999	Catalina	CSS	·	1.6 km	MPC · JPL

== 200201–200300 ==
back to top

Designation			Discovery			Properties		Ref
Permanent	Provisional	Named after	Date	Site	Discoverer(s)	Category	Diam.	Ref
200201	1999 RY_{250}	—	September 5, 1999	Kitt Peak	Spacewatch	·	1.7 km	MPC · JPL
200202	1999 RZ_{251}	—	September 7, 1999	Catalina	CSS	·	5.3 km	MPC · JPL
200203	1999 SJ_{15}	—	September 30, 1999	Catalina	CSS	EUN	2.2 km	MPC · JPL
200204	1999 TX_{4}	—	October 2, 1999	Kleť	Kleť	·	2.2 km	MPC · JPL
200205	1999 TC_{28}	—	October 3, 1999	Socorro	LINEAR	·	4.4 km	MPC · JPL
200206	1999 TS_{61}	—	October 7, 1999	Kitt Peak	Spacewatch	·	1.9 km	MPC · JPL
200207	1999 TP_{87}	—	October 15, 1999	Kitt Peak	Spacewatch	·	1.6 km	MPC · JPL
200208	1999 TJ_{99}	—	October 2, 1999	Socorro	LINEAR	JUN	1.9 km	MPC · JPL
200209	1999 TQ_{111}	—	October 4, 1999	Socorro	LINEAR	EUN	2.2 km	MPC · JPL
200210	1999 TE_{121}	—	October 4, 1999	Socorro	LINEAR	·	1.7 km	MPC · JPL
200211	1999 TK_{144}	—	October 7, 1999	Socorro	LINEAR	H	1.1 km	MPC · JPL
200212	1999 TE_{152}	—	October 7, 1999	Socorro	LINEAR	·	2.5 km	MPC · JPL
200213	1999 TH_{169}	—	October 10, 1999	Socorro	LINEAR	·	3.4 km	MPC · JPL
200214	1999 TX_{169}	—	October 10, 1999	Socorro	LINEAR	·	2.9 km	MPC · JPL
200215	1999 TX_{178}	—	October 10, 1999	Socorro	LINEAR	·	3.0 km	MPC · JPL
200216	1999 TW_{184}	—	October 12, 1999	Socorro	LINEAR	EUN	1.3 km	MPC · JPL
200217	1999 TF_{200}	—	October 12, 1999	Socorro	LINEAR	·	2.2 km	MPC · JPL
200218	1999 TU_{211}	—	October 15, 1999	Socorro	LINEAR	·	3.5 km	MPC · JPL
200219	1999 TF_{220}	—	October 1, 1999	Catalina	CSS	·	2.3 km	MPC · JPL
200220	1999 TC_{225}	—	October 2, 1999	Kitt Peak	Spacewatch	·	1.4 km	MPC · JPL
200221	1999 TB_{229}	—	October 4, 1999	Kitt Peak	Spacewatch	·	2.8 km	MPC · JPL
200222	1999 TB_{266}	—	October 3, 1999	Socorro	LINEAR	ADE	4.2 km	MPC · JPL
200223	1999 TD_{270}	—	October 3, 1999	Socorro	LINEAR	ADE	5.5 km	MPC · JPL
200224	1999 TO_{274}	—	October 6, 1999	Socorro	LINEAR	(5)	2.1 km	MPC · JPL
200225	1999 TJ_{291}	—	October 10, 1999	Socorro	LINEAR	·	3.4 km	MPC · JPL
200226	1999 UO_{18}	—	October 30, 1999	Kitt Peak	Spacewatch	·	2.3 km	MPC · JPL
200227	1999 UU_{20}	—	October 31, 1999	Kitt Peak	Spacewatch	·	2.0 km	MPC · JPL
200228	1999 UY_{20}	—	October 31, 1999	Kitt Peak	Spacewatch	·	2.0 km	MPC · JPL
200229	1999 UU_{28}	—	October 31, 1999	Kitt Peak	Spacewatch	·	2.9 km	MPC · JPL
200230	1999 UE_{37}	—	October 16, 1999	Kitt Peak	Spacewatch	·	1.8 km	MPC · JPL
200231	1999 UF_{37}	—	October 16, 1999	Kitt Peak	Spacewatch	·	2.8 km	MPC · JPL
200232	1999 UG_{51}	—	October 31, 1999	Catalina	CSS	·	4.5 km	MPC · JPL
200233	1999 VV_{2}	—	November 4, 1999	Bergisch Gladbach	W. Bickel	·	2.4 km	MPC · JPL
200234 Kumashiro	1999 VN_{8}	Kumashiro	November 4, 1999	Kuma Kogen	A. Nakamura	GEF	1.6 km	MPC · JPL
200235	1999 VK_{17}	—	November 2, 1999	Kitt Peak	Spacewatch	·	2.3 km	MPC · JPL
200236	1999 VW_{30}	—	November 3, 1999	Socorro	LINEAR	·	2.6 km	MPC · JPL
200237	1999 VT_{51}	—	November 3, 1999	Socorro	LINEAR	·	1.9 km	MPC · JPL
200238	1999 VA_{55}	—	November 4, 1999	Socorro	LINEAR	·	3.4 km	MPC · JPL
200239	1999 VM_{76}	—	November 5, 1999	Kitt Peak	Spacewatch	(12739)	2.2 km	MPC · JPL
200240	1999 VS_{82}	—	November 1, 1999	Kitt Peak	Spacewatch	·	2.5 km	MPC · JPL
200241	1999 VY_{97}	—	November 9, 1999	Socorro	LINEAR	·	2.8 km	MPC · JPL
200242	1999 VB_{114}	—	November 9, 1999	Catalina	CSS	·	3.2 km	MPC · JPL
200243	1999 VU_{116}	—	November 5, 1999	Kitt Peak	Spacewatch	·	2.3 km	MPC · JPL
200244	1999 VL_{119}	—	November 3, 1999	Kitt Peak	Spacewatch	·	3.0 km	MPC · JPL
200245	1999 VM_{120}	—	November 4, 1999	Kitt Peak	Spacewatch	·	1.6 km	MPC · JPL
200246	1999 VK_{125}	—	November 6, 1999	Kitt Peak	Spacewatch	·	1.9 km	MPC · JPL
200247	1999 VJ_{130}	—	November 12, 1999	Kitt Peak	Spacewatch	·	3.3 km	MPC · JPL
200248	1999 VY_{137}	—	November 13, 1999	Socorro	LINEAR	·	4.6 km	MPC · JPL
200249	1999 VS_{138}	—	November 9, 1999	Kitt Peak	Spacewatch	·	4.1 km	MPC · JPL
200250	1999 VV_{148}	—	November 14, 1999	Socorro	LINEAR	AGN	1.2 km	MPC · JPL
200251	1999 VM_{152}	—	November 10, 1999	Kitt Peak	Spacewatch	·	3.0 km	MPC · JPL
200252	1999 VW_{153}	—	November 15, 1999	Kitt Peak	Spacewatch	·	1.8 km	MPC · JPL
200253	1999 VN_{184}	—	November 15, 1999	Socorro	LINEAR	·	3.8 km	MPC · JPL
200254	1999 VM_{190}	—	November 15, 1999	Socorro	LINEAR	·	4.5 km	MPC · JPL
200255 Weigle	1999 VT_{204}	Weigle	November 10, 1999	Kitt Peak	M. W. Buie	·	1.5 km	MPC · JPL
200256	1999 VQ_{225}	—	November 5, 1999	Socorro	LINEAR	MRX	1.7 km	MPC · JPL
200257	1999 VP_{226}	—	November 2, 1999	Catalina	CSS	·	3.2 km	MPC · JPL
200258	1999 VF_{231}	—	November 5, 1999	Socorro	LINEAR	·	2.7 km	MPC · JPL
200259	1999 WC_{14}	—	November 28, 1999	Kitt Peak	Spacewatch	·	2.3 km	MPC · JPL
200260	1999 WW_{18}	—	November 30, 1999	Kitt Peak	Spacewatch	NEM	3.0 km	MPC · JPL
200261	1999 XR	—	December 2, 1999	Kitt Peak	Spacewatch	·	4.0 km	MPC · JPL
200262	1999 XO_{46}	—	December 7, 1999	Socorro	LINEAR	·	3.4 km	MPC · JPL
200263	1999 XR_{47}	—	December 7, 1999	Socorro	LINEAR	JUN	1.7 km	MPC · JPL
200264	1999 XG_{48}	—	December 7, 1999	Socorro	LINEAR	·	2.2 km	MPC · JPL
200265	1999 XQ_{54}	—	December 7, 1999	Socorro	LINEAR	·	2.3 km	MPC · JPL
200266	1999 XG_{72}	—	December 7, 1999	Socorro	LINEAR	MRX	2.0 km	MPC · JPL
200267	1999 XG_{109}	—	December 4, 1999	Catalina	CSS	·	4.1 km	MPC · JPL
200268	1999 XJ_{110}	—	December 4, 1999	Catalina	CSS	MAR	1.8 km	MPC · JPL
200269	1999 XO_{110}	—	December 5, 1999	Catalina	CSS	·	3.1 km	MPC · JPL
200270	1999 XX_{110}	—	December 5, 1999	Catalina	CSS	·	3.7 km	MPC · JPL
200271	1999 XA_{125}	—	December 7, 1999	Catalina	CSS	·	3.4 km	MPC · JPL
200272	1999 XA_{127}	—	December 7, 1999	Catalina	CSS	JUN	2.3 km	MPC · JPL
200273	1999 XK_{187}	—	December 12, 1999	Socorro	LINEAR	·	3.3 km	MPC · JPL
200274	1999 XW_{207}	—	December 12, 1999	Socorro	LINEAR	·	3.7 km	MPC · JPL
200275	1999 XZ_{209}	—	December 13, 1999	Socorro	LINEAR	GEF	4.4 km	MPC · JPL
200276	1999 XF_{216}	—	December 13, 1999	Kitt Peak	Spacewatch	·	3.6 km	MPC · JPL
200277	1999 XY_{217}	—	December 13, 1999	Kitt Peak	Spacewatch	GEF	2.1 km	MPC · JPL
200278	1999 XZ_{218}	—	December 15, 1999	Kitt Peak	Spacewatch	·	3.2 km	MPC · JPL
200279	1999 XC_{237}	—	December 5, 1999	Kitt Peak	Spacewatch	·	3.1 km	MPC · JPL
200280	1999 XF_{244}	—	December 3, 1999	Socorro	LINEAR	·	3.6 km	MPC · JPL
200281	1999 XF_{252}	—	December 9, 1999	Kitt Peak	Spacewatch	·	3.7 km	MPC · JPL
200282	1999 YB_{5}	—	December 28, 1999	Prescott	P. G. Comba	·	3.2 km	MPC · JPL
200283	1999 YG_{10}	—	December 27, 1999	Kitt Peak	Spacewatch	·	2.7 km	MPC · JPL
200284	1999 YE_{12}	—	December 27, 1999	Kitt Peak	Spacewatch	NEM	3.6 km	MPC · JPL
200285	1999 YF_{12}	—	December 27, 1999	Kitt Peak	Spacewatch	·	2.5 km	MPC · JPL
200286	2000 AY_{49}	—	January 2, 2000	Višnjan	K. Korlević	·	4.5 km	MPC · JPL
200287	2000 AW_{50}	—	January 6, 2000	Olathe	Olathe	·	3.8 km	MPC · JPL
200288	2000 AZ_{61}	—	January 4, 2000	Socorro	LINEAR	JUN	2.3 km	MPC · JPL
200289	2000 AT_{80}	—	January 5, 2000	Socorro	LINEAR	(18466)	3.5 km	MPC · JPL
200290	2000 AD_{108}	—	January 5, 2000	Socorro	LINEAR	GEF ·	4.2 km	MPC · JPL
200291	2000 AW_{108}	—	January 5, 2000	Socorro	LINEAR	·	3.4 km	MPC · JPL
200292	2000 AY_{115}	—	January 5, 2000	Socorro	LINEAR	·	3.5 km	MPC · JPL
200293	2000 AG_{181}	—	January 7, 2000	Socorro	LINEAR	·	6.9 km	MPC · JPL
200294	2000 AT_{205}	—	January 15, 2000	Višnjan	K. Korlević	·	3.4 km	MPC · JPL
200295	2000 AT_{213}	—	January 6, 2000	Kitt Peak	Spacewatch	·	2.9 km	MPC · JPL
200296	2000 AV_{218}	—	January 8, 2000	Kitt Peak	Spacewatch	·	4.5 km	MPC · JPL
200297	2000 AC_{219}	—	January 8, 2000	Kitt Peak	Spacewatch	KOR	2.3 km	MPC · JPL
200298	2000 AS_{229}	—	January 3, 2000	Socorro	LINEAR	·	3.4 km	MPC · JPL
200299	2000 AY_{233}	—	January 5, 2000	Socorro	LINEAR	·	2.9 km	MPC · JPL
200300	2000 BK_{14}	—	January 28, 2000	Oizumi	T. Kobayashi	·	3.4 km	MPC · JPL

== 200301–200400 ==
back to top

Designation			Discovery			Properties		Ref
Permanent	Provisional	Named after	Date	Site	Discoverer(s)	Category	Diam.	Ref
200301	2000 CS_{19}	—	February 2, 2000	Socorro	LINEAR	·	3.4 km	MPC · JPL
200302	2000 CW_{78}	—	February 8, 2000	Kitt Peak	Spacewatch	·	3.0 km	MPC · JPL
200303	2000 CQ_{97}	—	February 9, 2000	Višnjan	K. Korlević	·	2.5 km	MPC · JPL
200304	2000 CL_{108}	—	February 5, 2000	Catalina	CSS	·	7.4 km	MPC · JPL
200305	2000 CW_{125}	—	February 3, 2000	Socorro	LINEAR	·	3.8 km	MPC · JPL
200306	2000 CO_{137}	—	February 4, 2000	Kitt Peak	Spacewatch	KOR	1.9 km	MPC · JPL
200307	2000 DD_{55}	—	February 29, 2000	Socorro	LINEAR	·	2.9 km	MPC · JPL
200308	2000 DN_{57}	—	February 29, 2000	Socorro	LINEAR	·	2.4 km	MPC · JPL
200309	2000 DY_{88}	—	February 26, 2000	Kitt Peak	Spacewatch	·	2.1 km	MPC · JPL
200310	2000 DR_{92}	—	February 28, 2000	Kitt Peak	Spacewatch	·	4.5 km	MPC · JPL
200311	2000 EH_{10}	—	March 3, 2000	Socorro	LINEAR	·	770 m	MPC · JPL
200312	2000 ER_{59}	—	March 10, 2000	Socorro	LINEAR	·	3.9 km	MPC · JPL
200313	2000 EB_{62}	—	March 10, 2000	Socorro	LINEAR	·	3.5 km	MPC · JPL
200314	2000 ER_{115}	—	March 10, 2000	Kitt Peak	Spacewatch	·	3.0 km	MPC · JPL
200315	2000 EH_{124}	—	March 11, 2000	Anderson Mesa	LONEOS	·	5.7 km	MPC · JPL
200316	2000 EQ_{169}	—	March 4, 2000	Socorro	LINEAR	BRA	3.0 km	MPC · JPL
200317	2000 EW_{174}	—	March 2, 2000	Kitt Peak	Spacewatch	·	880 m	MPC · JPL
200318	2000 ER_{197}	—	March 4, 2000	Kitt Peak	Spacewatch	·	1.4 km	MPC · JPL
200319	2000 FE_{20}	—	March 29, 2000	Socorro	LINEAR	·	4.8 km	MPC · JPL
200320	2000 FF_{69}	—	March 27, 2000	Kitt Peak	Spacewatch	·	2.7 km	MPC · JPL
200321	2000 GU_{4}	—	April 5, 2000	Socorro	LINEAR	PHO	1.4 km	MPC · JPL
200322	2000 GJ_{20}	—	April 5, 2000	Socorro	LINEAR	·	1.3 km	MPC · JPL
200323	2000 GH_{22}	—	April 5, 2000	Socorro	LINEAR	·	950 m	MPC · JPL
200324	2000 GA_{27}	—	April 5, 2000	Socorro	LINEAR	·	4.6 km	MPC · JPL
200325	2000 GM_{32}	—	April 5, 2000	Socorro	LINEAR	·	1.9 km	MPC · JPL
200326	2000 GZ_{34}	—	April 5, 2000	Socorro	LINEAR	·	1.1 km	MPC · JPL
200327	2000 GL_{63}	—	April 5, 2000	Socorro	LINEAR	·	4.2 km	MPC · JPL
200328	2000 GN_{70}	—	April 5, 2000	Socorro	LINEAR	·	1.4 km	MPC · JPL
200329	2000 GJ_{112}	—	April 3, 2000	Anderson Mesa	LONEOS	EMA	5.9 km	MPC · JPL
200330	2000 GO_{129}	—	April 5, 2000	Kitt Peak	Spacewatch	·	3.8 km	MPC · JPL
200331	2000 GR_{129}	—	April 5, 2000	Kitt Peak	Spacewatch	·	5.1 km	MPC · JPL
200332	2000 GT_{135}	—	April 8, 2000	Socorro	LINEAR	·	4.4 km	MPC · JPL
200333	2000 GC_{186}	—	April 4, 2000	Anderson Mesa	LONEOS	·	3.9 km	MPC · JPL
200334	2000 HO_{11}	—	April 30, 2000	Eskridge	Farpoint	·	1.5 km	MPC · JPL
200335	2000 HS_{18}	—	April 25, 2000	Kitt Peak	Spacewatch	·	1.0 km	MPC · JPL
200336	2000 HN_{24}	—	April 24, 2000	Anderson Mesa	LONEOS	·	4.5 km	MPC · JPL
200337	2000 HA_{41}	—	April 28, 2000	Socorro	LINEAR	·	3.0 km	MPC · JPL
200338	2000 HP_{43}	—	April 29, 2000	Kitt Peak	Spacewatch	·	1.1 km	MPC · JPL
200339	2000 HX_{50}	—	April 29, 2000	Socorro	LINEAR	·	980 m	MPC · JPL
200340	2000 HR_{82}	—	April 29, 2000	Socorro	LINEAR	HYG	3.8 km	MPC · JPL
200341	2000 HU_{93}	—	April 29, 2000	Socorro	LINEAR	·	1.1 km	MPC · JPL
200342	2000 HT_{95}	—	April 28, 2000	Kitt Peak	Spacewatch	·	5.5 km	MPC · JPL
200343	2000 JV	—	May 1, 2000	Socorro	LINEAR	·	4.7 km	MPC · JPL
200344	2000 JA_{1}	—	May 1, 2000	Socorro	LINEAR	·	5.7 km	MPC · JPL
200345	2000 JC_{1}	—	May 1, 2000	Socorro	LINEAR	·	4.7 km	MPC · JPL
200346	2000 JU_{6}	—	May 4, 2000	Socorro	LINEAR	·	5.3 km	MPC · JPL
200347	2000 JC_{42}	—	May 11, 2000	Kitt Peak	Spacewatch	·	960 m	MPC · JPL
200348	2000 JB_{64}	—	May 10, 2000	Socorro	LINEAR	·	1.2 km	MPC · JPL
200349	2000 JN_{82}	—	May 7, 2000	Socorro	LINEAR	·	3.0 km	MPC · JPL
200350	2000 KV_{27}	—	May 28, 2000	Socorro	LINEAR	·	2.7 km	MPC · JPL
200351	2000 KN_{34}	—	May 27, 2000	Socorro	LINEAR	V	940 m	MPC · JPL
200352	2000 KH_{37}	—	May 24, 2000	Kitt Peak	Spacewatch	·	5.6 km	MPC · JPL
200353	2000 KR_{39}	—	May 24, 2000	Kitt Peak	Spacewatch	V	800 m	MPC · JPL
200354	2000 KR_{42}	—	May 31, 2000	Kitt Peak	Spacewatch	·	1.4 km	MPC · JPL
200355	2000 KY_{46}	—	May 27, 2000	Socorro	LINEAR	·	4.7 km	MPC · JPL
200356	2000 KS_{51}	—	May 31, 2000	Kitt Peak	Spacewatch	·	3.8 km	MPC · JPL
200357	2000 KD_{52}	—	May 23, 2000	Anderson Mesa	LONEOS	·	3.4 km	MPC · JPL
200358	2000 OO_{37}	—	July 30, 2000	Socorro	LINEAR	fast	4.2 km	MPC · JPL
200359	2000 PB_{7}	—	August 1, 2000	Ondřejov	P. Pravec, L. Kotková	V	1.1 km	MPC · JPL
200360	2000 PN_{25}	—	August 4, 2000	Socorro	LINEAR	·	1.6 km	MPC · JPL
200361	2000 PO_{32}	—	August 3, 2000	Socorro	LINEAR	·	1.7 km	MPC · JPL
200362	2000 QL	—	August 21, 2000	Prescott	P. G. Comba	MAS	1.1 km	MPC · JPL
200363	2000 QD_{2}	—	August 24, 2000	Socorro	LINEAR	H	720 m	MPC · JPL
200364	2000 QA_{26}	—	August 23, 2000	Reedy Creek	J. Broughton	·	1.6 km	MPC · JPL
200365	2000 QX_{38}	—	August 24, 2000	Socorro	LINEAR	VER	6.1 km	MPC · JPL
200366	2000 QG_{48}	—	August 24, 2000	Socorro	LINEAR	NYS	1.5 km	MPC · JPL
200367	2000 QZ_{50}	—	August 24, 2000	Socorro	LINEAR	·	2.8 km	MPC · JPL
200368	2000 QS_{51}	—	August 24, 2000	Socorro	LINEAR	·	1.6 km	MPC · JPL
200369	2000 QL_{57}	—	August 26, 2000	Socorro	LINEAR	NYS	1.6 km	MPC · JPL
200370	2000 QX_{64}	—	August 28, 2000	Socorro	LINEAR	·	2.3 km	MPC · JPL
200371	2000 QF_{66}	—	August 28, 2000	Socorro	LINEAR	·	2.5 km	MPC · JPL
200372	2000 QW_{81}	—	August 24, 2000	Socorro	LINEAR	V	1.2 km	MPC · JPL
200373	2000 QH_{89}	—	August 25, 2000	Socorro	LINEAR	·	2.3 km	MPC · JPL
200374	2000 QK_{91}	—	August 25, 2000	Socorro	LINEAR	·	1.8 km	MPC · JPL
200375	2000 QQ_{91}	—	August 25, 2000	Socorro	LINEAR	·	1.5 km	MPC · JPL
200376	2000 QL_{99}	—	August 28, 2000	Socorro	LINEAR	·	1.9 km	MPC · JPL
200377	2000 QT_{120}	—	August 25, 2000	Socorro	LINEAR	V	1.2 km	MPC · JPL
200378	2000 QV_{134}	—	August 26, 2000	Socorro	LINEAR	·	1.8 km	MPC · JPL
200379	2000 QW_{152}	—	August 29, 2000	Socorro	LINEAR	·	1.2 km	MPC · JPL
200380	2000 QG_{160}	—	August 31, 2000	Socorro	LINEAR	·	2.3 km	MPC · JPL
200381	2000 QJ_{167}	—	August 31, 2000	Socorro	LINEAR	V	920 m	MPC · JPL
200382	2000 QV_{169}	—	August 31, 2000	Socorro	LINEAR	·	1.8 km	MPC · JPL
200383	2000 QG_{175}	—	August 31, 2000	Socorro	LINEAR	·	2.1 km	MPC · JPL
200384	2000 QY_{182}	—	August 31, 2000	Socorro	LINEAR	·	1.2 km	MPC · JPL
200385	2000 QH_{194}	—	August 31, 2000	Socorro	LINEAR	·	1.9 km	MPC · JPL
200386	2000 QT_{196}	—	August 29, 2000	Socorro	LINEAR	·	1.5 km	MPC · JPL
200387	2000 QM_{210}	—	August 31, 2000	Socorro	LINEAR	NYS	1.4 km	MPC · JPL
200388	2000 QD_{224}	—	August 26, 2000	Kitt Peak	Spacewatch	V	950 m	MPC · JPL
200389	2000 QH_{252}	—	August 28, 2000	Socorro	LINEAR	·	2.6 km	MPC · JPL
200390	2000 RE_{18}	—	September 1, 2000	Socorro	LINEAR	·	2.1 km	MPC · JPL
200391	2000 RU_{18}	—	September 1, 2000	Socorro	LINEAR	·	1.9 km	MPC · JPL
200392	2000 RN_{21}	—	September 1, 2000	Socorro	LINEAR	·	2.1 km	MPC · JPL
200393	2000 RM_{25}	—	September 1, 2000	Socorro	LINEAR	·	2.4 km	MPC · JPL
200394	2000 RJ_{51}	—	September 5, 2000	Socorro	LINEAR	·	2.8 km	MPC · JPL
200395	2000 RV_{63}	—	September 3, 2000	Socorro	LINEAR	·	2.1 km	MPC · JPL
200396	2000 RJ_{64}	—	September 1, 2000	Socorro	LINEAR	EUN	2.5 km	MPC · JPL
200397	2000 RR_{76}	—	September 4, 2000	Socorro	LINEAR	NYS	2.1 km	MPC · JPL
200398	2000 RE_{89}	—	September 3, 2000	Socorro	LINEAR	·	2.1 km	MPC · JPL
200399	2000 RQ_{102}	—	September 5, 2000	Anderson Mesa	LONEOS	·	2.6 km	MPC · JPL
200400	2000 SZ_{24}	—	September 26, 2000	Bisei SG Center	BATTeRS	·	2.0 km	MPC · JPL

== 200401–200500 ==
back to top

Designation			Discovery			Properties		Ref
Permanent	Provisional	Named after	Date	Site	Discoverer(s)	Category	Diam.	Ref
200401	2000 SF_{25}	—	September 22, 2000	Socorro	LINEAR	EUN	1.9 km	MPC · JPL
200402	2000 SG_{44}	—	September 24, 2000	Socorro	LINEAR	H	760 m	MPC · JPL
200403	2000 SV_{52}	—	September 24, 2000	Socorro	LINEAR	NYS	1.9 km	MPC · JPL
200404	2000 SW_{59}	—	September 24, 2000	Socorro	LINEAR	NYS	1.6 km	MPC · JPL
200405	2000 SA_{66}	—	September 24, 2000	Socorro	LINEAR	MAS	1.3 km	MPC · JPL
200406	2000 SK_{74}	—	September 24, 2000	Socorro	LINEAR	·	2.3 km	MPC · JPL
200407	2000 SN_{79}	—	September 24, 2000	Socorro	LINEAR	·	2.1 km	MPC · JPL
200408	2000 SH_{83}	—	September 24, 2000	Socorro	LINEAR	·	2.2 km	MPC · JPL
200409	2000 ST_{91}	—	September 23, 2000	Socorro	LINEAR	·	2.5 km	MPC · JPL
200410	2000 SH_{103}	—	September 24, 2000	Socorro	LINEAR	·	1.5 km	MPC · JPL
200411	2000 SW_{105}	—	September 24, 2000	Socorro	LINEAR	·	1.8 km	MPC · JPL
200412	2000 SE_{118}	—	September 24, 2000	Socorro	LINEAR	MAS	1.2 km	MPC · JPL
200413	2000 SF_{126}	—	September 24, 2000	Socorro	LINEAR	·	2.8 km	MPC · JPL
200414	2000 SQ_{133}	—	September 23, 2000	Socorro	LINEAR	·	1.9 km	MPC · JPL
200415	2000 SE_{159}	—	September 27, 2000	Kitt Peak	Spacewatch	·	2.3 km	MPC · JPL
200416	2000 SG_{181}	—	September 19, 2000	Haleakala	NEAT	·	1.9 km	MPC · JPL
200417	2000 SO_{182}	—	September 30, 2000	Socorro	LINEAR	T_{j} (2.84)	11 km	MPC · JPL
200418	2000 SL_{198}	—	September 24, 2000	Socorro	LINEAR	·	2.3 km	MPC · JPL
200419	2000 SN_{199}	—	September 24, 2000	Socorro	LINEAR	·	2.0 km	MPC · JPL
200420	2000 SX_{208}	—	September 25, 2000	Socorro	LINEAR	·	3.0 km	MPC · JPL
200421	2000 SW_{217}	—	September 26, 2000	Socorro	LINEAR	·	2.5 km	MPC · JPL
200422	2000 SN_{230}	—	September 28, 2000	Socorro	LINEAR	·	2.4 km	MPC · JPL
200423	2000 SL_{234}	—	September 21, 2000	Socorro	LINEAR	·	2.0 km	MPC · JPL
200424	2000 ST_{236}	—	September 24, 2000	Socorro	LINEAR	MAS	1.1 km	MPC · JPL
200425	2000 SE_{289}	—	September 27, 2000	Socorro	LINEAR	·	1.9 km	MPC · JPL
200426	2000 SC_{299}	—	September 28, 2000	Socorro	LINEAR	ERI	2.6 km	MPC · JPL
200427	2000 SA_{336}	—	September 26, 2000	Haleakala	NEAT	·	2.0 km	MPC · JPL
200428	2000 SK_{337}	—	September 25, 2000	Socorro	LINEAR	·	1.8 km	MPC · JPL
200429	2000 SF_{340}	—	September 24, 2000	Socorro	LINEAR	·	1.5 km	MPC · JPL
200430	2000 TS_{18}	—	October 1, 2000	Socorro	LINEAR	·	1.4 km	MPC · JPL
200431	2000 TH_{24}	—	October 2, 2000	Socorro	LINEAR	NYS	1.4 km	MPC · JPL
200432	2000 TY_{32}	—	October 4, 2000	Socorro	LINEAR	H	1.1 km	MPC · JPL
200433	2000 TX_{35}	—	October 6, 2000	Anderson Mesa	LONEOS	·	1.9 km	MPC · JPL
200434	2000 US_{33}	—	October 31, 2000	Socorro	LINEAR	·	3.9 km	MPC · JPL
200435	2000 UN_{34}	—	October 24, 2000	Socorro	LINEAR	·	1.9 km	MPC · JPL
200436	2000 UV_{34}	—	October 24, 2000	Socorro	LINEAR	·	1.7 km	MPC · JPL
200437	2000 UD_{45}	—	October 24, 2000	Socorro	LINEAR	·	2.4 km	MPC · JPL
200438	2000 UB_{63}	—	October 25, 2000	Socorro	LINEAR	·	2.2 km	MPC · JPL
200439	2000 UW_{74}	—	October 31, 2000	Socorro	LINEAR	·	1.6 km	MPC · JPL
200440	2000 UY_{83}	—	October 31, 2000	Socorro	LINEAR	NYS	1.9 km	MPC · JPL
200441	2000 UF_{108}	—	October 30, 2000	Socorro	LINEAR	T_{j} (2.96) · HIL · 3:2	5.6 km	MPC · JPL
200442	2000 VH_{13}	—	November 1, 2000	Socorro	LINEAR	(5)	1.6 km	MPC · JPL
200443	2000 VF_{14}	—	November 1, 2000	Socorro	LINEAR	NYS	2.0 km	MPC · JPL
200444	2000 VQ_{14}	—	November 1, 2000	Socorro	LINEAR	·	1.8 km	MPC · JPL
200445	2000 VU_{21}	—	November 1, 2000	Socorro	LINEAR	T_{j} (2.99) · 3:2	7.2 km	MPC · JPL
200446	2000 VG_{39}	—	November 2, 2000	Socorro	LINEAR	·	2.5 km	MPC · JPL
200447	2000 WD_{9}	—	November 21, 2000	Kitt Peak	Spacewatch	H	790 m	MPC · JPL
200448	2000 WF_{9}	—	November 20, 2000	Socorro	LINEAR	H	1.0 km	MPC · JPL
200449	2000 WY_{12}	—	November 19, 2000	Socorro	LINEAR	·	1.8 km	MPC · JPL
200450	2000 WH_{16}	—	November 21, 2000	Socorro	LINEAR	(5)	1.7 km	MPC · JPL
200451	2000 WN_{21}	—	November 21, 2000	Needville	Needville	·	1.7 km	MPC · JPL
200452	2000 WE_{59}	—	November 21, 2000	Socorro	LINEAR	·	2.3 km	MPC · JPL
200453	2000 WA_{60}	—	November 21, 2000	Socorro	LINEAR	fast	3.7 km	MPC · JPL
200454	2000 WQ_{60}	—	November 21, 2000	Socorro	LINEAR	·	2.3 km	MPC · JPL
200455	2000 WB_{77}	—	November 20, 2000	Socorro	LINEAR	V	1.1 km	MPC · JPL
200456	2000 WX_{93}	—	November 21, 2000	Socorro	LINEAR	NYS	2.0 km	MPC · JPL
200457	2000 WM_{98}	—	November 21, 2000	Socorro	LINEAR	·	1.9 km	MPC · JPL
200458	2000 WY_{106}	—	November 20, 2000	Socorro	LINEAR	H	940 m	MPC · JPL
200459	2000 WY_{110}	—	November 20, 2000	Socorro	LINEAR	·	2.4 km	MPC · JPL
200460	2000 WR_{112}	—	November 20, 2000	Socorro	LINEAR	·	2.8 km	MPC · JPL
200461	2000 WX_{114}	—	November 20, 2000	Socorro	LINEAR	·	3.0 km	MPC · JPL
200462	2000 WZ_{117}	—	November 20, 2000	Socorro	LINEAR	·	2.3 km	MPC · JPL
200463	2000 WB_{134}	—	November 19, 2000	Socorro	LINEAR	·	2.4 km	MPC · JPL
200464	2000 WD_{134}	—	November 19, 2000	Socorro	LINEAR	V	1.4 km	MPC · JPL
200465	2000 WT_{140}	—	November 21, 2000	Socorro	LINEAR	3:2 · SHU	7.8 km	MPC · JPL
200466	2000 WG_{148}	—	November 29, 2000	Kitt Peak	Spacewatch	·	4.5 km	MPC · JPL
200467	2000 WG_{165}	—	November 23, 2000	Haleakala	NEAT	·	2.4 km	MPC · JPL
200468	2000 WZ_{188}	—	November 18, 2000	Anderson Mesa	LONEOS	·	2.5 km	MPC · JPL
200469	2000 WF_{192}	—	November 19, 2000	Anderson Mesa	LONEOS	EUN	1.8 km	MPC · JPL
200470	2000 XU_{12}	—	December 4, 2000	Socorro	LINEAR	·	4.6 km	MPC · JPL
200471	2000 XW_{21}	—	December 4, 2000	Socorro	LINEAR	·	4.1 km	MPC · JPL
200472	2000 XY_{21}	—	December 4, 2000	Socorro	LINEAR	EUN	2.7 km	MPC · JPL
200473	2000 XW_{33}	—	December 4, 2000	Socorro	LINEAR	H	1.1 km	MPC · JPL
200474	2000 XD_{46}	—	December 15, 2000	Socorro	LINEAR	H	1.4 km	MPC · JPL
200475	2000 XJ_{47}	—	December 15, 2000	Socorro	LINEAR	·	1.7 km	MPC · JPL
200476	2000 YJ_{1}	—	December 17, 2000	Socorro	LINEAR	H	910 m	MPC · JPL
200477	2000 YY_{5}	—	December 19, 2000	Socorro	LINEAR	H	990 m	MPC · JPL
200478	2000 YU_{11}	—	December 19, 2000	Haleakala	NEAT	EUN	2.5 km	MPC · JPL
200479	2000 YO_{12}	—	December 22, 2000	Ondřejov	P. Kušnirák, P. Pravec	·	1.9 km	MPC · JPL
200480	2000 YZ_{16}	—	December 21, 2000	Socorro	LINEAR	H	1.1 km	MPC · JPL
200481	2000 YX_{17}	—	December 20, 2000	Socorro	LINEAR	slow	5.1 km	MPC · JPL
200482	2000 YA_{24}	—	December 28, 2000	Kitt Peak	Spacewatch	·	4.1 km	MPC · JPL
200483	2000 YZ_{25}	—	December 23, 2000	Socorro	LINEAR	(194)	2.1 km	MPC · JPL
200484	2000 YS_{33}	—	December 24, 2000	Haleakala	NEAT	H	970 m	MPC · JPL
200485	2000 YE_{38}	—	December 30, 2000	Socorro	LINEAR	MAR	2.7 km	MPC · JPL
200486	2000 YK_{38}	—	December 30, 2000	Socorro	LINEAR	·	2.3 km	MPC · JPL
200487	2000 YV_{39}	—	December 30, 2000	Socorro	LINEAR	·	2.5 km	MPC · JPL
200488	2000 YO_{49}	—	December 30, 2000	Socorro	LINEAR	·	2.1 km	MPC · JPL
200489	2000 YW_{52}	—	December 30, 2000	Socorro	LINEAR	JUN	2.5 km	MPC · JPL
200490	2000 YD_{60}	—	December 30, 2000	Socorro	LINEAR	·	2.5 km	MPC · JPL
200491	2000 YA_{64}	—	December 30, 2000	Socorro	LINEAR	RAF	2.1 km	MPC · JPL
200492	2000 YZ_{67}	—	December 28, 2000	Socorro	LINEAR	·	4.3 km	MPC · JPL
200493	2000 YW_{70}	—	December 30, 2000	Socorro	LINEAR	·	1.6 km	MPC · JPL
200494	2000 YH_{74}	—	December 30, 2000	Socorro	LINEAR	EUN	2.4 km	MPC · JPL
200495	2000 YE_{83}	—	December 30, 2000	Socorro	LINEAR	·	4.4 km	MPC · JPL
200496	2000 YK_{89}	—	December 30, 2000	Socorro	LINEAR	·	2.2 km	MPC · JPL
200497	2000 YJ_{91}	—	December 30, 2000	Socorro	LINEAR	MAR	1.8 km	MPC · JPL
200498	2000 YF_{120}	—	December 19, 2000	Kitt Peak	Spacewatch	·	2.7 km	MPC · JPL
200499	2000 YE_{132}	—	December 30, 2000	Socorro	LINEAR	·	1.9 km	MPC · JPL
200500	2001 AY_{7}	—	January 2, 2001	Socorro	LINEAR	·	2.7 km	MPC · JPL

== 200501–200600 ==
back to top

Designation			Discovery			Properties		Ref
Permanent	Provisional	Named after	Date	Site	Discoverer(s)	Category	Diam.	Ref
200501	2001 AX_{12}	—	January 2, 2001	Socorro	LINEAR	·	2.0 km	MPC · JPL
200502	2001 AD_{14}	—	January 2, 2001	Socorro	LINEAR	(5)	1.9 km	MPC · JPL
200503	2001 AT_{25}	—	January 5, 2001	Socorro	LINEAR	H	990 m	MPC · JPL
200504	2001 AX_{25}	—	January 4, 2001	Fair Oaks Ranch	J. V. McClusky	BAR	1.9 km	MPC · JPL
200505	2001 AB_{36}	—	January 5, 2001	Socorro	LINEAR	·	4.7 km	MPC · JPL
200506	2001 AD_{52}	—	January 4, 2001	Anderson Mesa	LONEOS	·	3.1 km	MPC · JPL
200507	2001 BQ_{4}	—	January 18, 2001	Socorro	LINEAR	ADE	4.7 km	MPC · JPL
200508	2001 BR_{4}	—	January 18, 2001	Socorro	LINEAR	·	3.2 km	MPC · JPL
200509	2001 BZ_{6}	—	January 19, 2001	Socorro	LINEAR	MAR	2.0 km	MPC · JPL
200510	2001 BQ_{10}	—	January 19, 2001	Socorro	LINEAR	H	1.1 km	MPC · JPL
200511	2001 BN_{11}	—	January 16, 2001	Gnosca	S. Sposetti	·	1.4 km	MPC · JPL
200512	2001 BR_{25}	—	January 20, 2001	Socorro	LINEAR	·	2.6 km	MPC · JPL
200513	2001 BC_{41}	—	January 24, 2001	Socorro	LINEAR	(5)	2.8 km	MPC · JPL
200514	2001 BL_{53}	—	January 17, 2001	Haleakala	NEAT	·	3.0 km	MPC · JPL
200515	2001 BF_{58}	—	January 21, 2001	Socorro	LINEAR	(5)	2.0 km	MPC · JPL
200516	2001 BS_{64}	—	January 30, 2001	Socorro	LINEAR	·	2.8 km	MPC · JPL
200517	2001 BM_{75}	—	January 26, 2001	Kitt Peak	Spacewatch	·	2.1 km	MPC · JPL
200518	2001 BE_{78}	—	January 24, 2001	Socorro	LINEAR	·	2.2 km	MPC · JPL
200519	2001 CJ	—	February 1, 2001	Socorro	LINEAR	H	890 m	MPC · JPL
200520	2001 CO_{8}	—	February 1, 2001	Socorro	LINEAR	·	2.0 km	MPC · JPL
200521	2001 CA_{15}	—	February 1, 2001	Socorro	LINEAR	·	2.7 km	MPC · JPL
200522	2001 CG_{19}	—	February 2, 2001	Socorro	LINEAR	·	1.7 km	MPC · JPL
200523	2001 CU_{23}	—	February 1, 2001	Anderson Mesa	LONEOS	·	2.4 km	MPC · JPL
200524	2001 CL_{25}	—	February 1, 2001	Socorro	LINEAR	·	3.2 km	MPC · JPL
200525	2001 CB_{27}	—	February 1, 2001	Haleakala	NEAT	·	2.2 km	MPC · JPL
200526	2001 CH_{35}	—	February 13, 2001	Socorro	LINEAR	H	1.1 km	MPC · JPL
200527	2001 CU_{39}	—	February 13, 2001	Socorro	LINEAR	EUN	1.9 km	MPC · JPL
200528	2001 CG_{48}	—	February 15, 2001	Socorro	LINEAR	(194)	2.4 km	MPC · JPL
200529	2001 DA	—	February 16, 2001	Kleť	Kleť	·	4.2 km	MPC · JPL
200530	2001 DR_{7}	—	February 18, 2001	Višnjan	K. Korlević	·	2.4 km	MPC · JPL
200531	2001 DH_{20}	—	February 16, 2001	Socorro	LINEAR	(5)	1.9 km	MPC · JPL
200532	2001 DH_{32}	—	February 17, 2001	Socorro	LINEAR	·	2.8 km	MPC · JPL
200533	2001 DV_{46}	—	February 19, 2001	Socorro	LINEAR	·	1.5 km	MPC · JPL
200534	2001 DU_{73}	—	February 19, 2001	Socorro	LINEAR	(5)	2.4 km	MPC · JPL
200535	2001 DN_{92}	—	February 19, 2001	Anderson Mesa	LONEOS	·	4.7 km	MPC · JPL
200536	2001 DX_{94}	—	February 19, 2001	Haleakala	NEAT	ADE	4.3 km	MPC · JPL
200537	2001 DA_{98}	—	February 17, 2001	Socorro	LINEAR	KON	4.9 km	MPC · JPL
200538	2001 EH	—	March 2, 2001	Desert Beaver	W. K. Y. Yeung	·	1.9 km	MPC · JPL
200539	2001 EY_{11}	—	March 3, 2001	Socorro	LINEAR	·	2.6 km	MPC · JPL
200540	2001 EF_{18}	—	March 14, 2001	Socorro	LINEAR	·	2.1 km	MPC · JPL
200541	2001 FX	—	March 17, 2001	Socorro	LINEAR	ADE	4.4 km	MPC · JPL
200542	2001 FA_{8}	—	March 18, 2001	Socorro	LINEAR	·	3.5 km	MPC · JPL
200543	2001 FH_{71}	—	March 19, 2001	Socorro	LINEAR	·	1.6 km	MPC · JPL
200544	2001 FJ_{86}	—	March 27, 2001	Kitt Peak	Spacewatch	L4	9.5 km	MPC · JPL
200545	2001 FZ_{87}	—	March 21, 2001	Anderson Mesa	LONEOS	·	1.9 km	MPC · JPL
200546	2001 FV_{138}	—	March 21, 2001	Haleakala	NEAT	·	2.9 km	MPC · JPL
200547	2001 FA_{148}	—	March 24, 2001	Socorro	LINEAR	·	2.0 km	MPC · JPL
200548	2001 FU_{154}	—	March 26, 2001	Socorro	LINEAR	GEF	2.5 km	MPC · JPL
200549	2001 FR_{156}	—	March 26, 2001	Haleakala	NEAT	·	2.2 km	MPC · JPL
200550	2001 FL_{163}	—	March 18, 2001	Anderson Mesa	LONEOS	·	2.2 km	MPC · JPL
200551	2001 FM_{186}	—	March 17, 2001	Socorro	LINEAR	·	2.1 km	MPC · JPL
200552	2001 HB_{12}	—	April 18, 2001	Socorro	LINEAR	·	3.1 km	MPC · JPL
200553	2001 HD_{46}	—	April 17, 2001	Anderson Mesa	LONEOS	·	4.1 km	MPC · JPL
200554	2001 KS_{20}	—	May 16, 2001	Palomar	NEAT	·	1.9 km	MPC · JPL
200555	2001 KY_{29}	—	May 21, 2001	Socorro	LINEAR	·	1.8 km	MPC · JPL
200556	2001 KA_{42}	—	May 25, 2001	Ondřejov	P. Kušnirák, P. Pravec	·	4.1 km	MPC · JPL
200557	2001 KH_{42}	—	May 24, 2001	Reedy Creek	J. Broughton	·	2.6 km	MPC · JPL
200558	2001 KY_{45}	—	May 22, 2001	Socorro	LINEAR	·	7.2 km	MPC · JPL
200559	2001 MQ_{1}	—	June 18, 2001	Palomar	NEAT	·	940 m	MPC · JPL
200560	2001 OG_{5}	—	July 17, 2001	Anderson Mesa	LONEOS	·	10 km	MPC · JPL
200561	2001 OJ_{16}	—	July 21, 2001	Palomar	NEAT	·	1.2 km	MPC · JPL
200562	2001 OB_{22}	—	July 21, 2001	Anderson Mesa	LONEOS	·	2.8 km	MPC · JPL
200563	2001 OJ_{29}	—	July 18, 2001	Palomar	NEAT	·	5.9 km	MPC · JPL
200564	2001 OX_{40}	—	July 20, 2001	Palomar	NEAT	·	1.2 km	MPC · JPL
200565	2001 OE_{56}	—	July 26, 2001	Palomar	NEAT	·	3.9 km	MPC · JPL
200566	2001 OT_{63}	—	July 27, 2001	Reedy Creek	J. Broughton	·	1.1 km	MPC · JPL
200567	2001 OW_{72}	—	July 21, 2001	Anderson Mesa	LONEOS	·	1.6 km	MPC · JPL
200568	2001 OK_{76}	—	July 22, 2001	Palomar	NEAT	·	5.4 km	MPC · JPL
200569	2001 PX_{18}	—	August 10, 2001	Palomar	NEAT	·	1.0 km	MPC · JPL
200570	2001 PP_{19}	—	August 10, 2001	Palomar	NEAT	·	1.2 km	MPC · JPL
200571	2001 PP_{22}	—	August 10, 2001	Haleakala	NEAT	·	1.1 km	MPC · JPL
200572	2001 PK_{25}	—	August 11, 2001	Haleakala	NEAT	·	890 m	MPC · JPL
200573	2001 PB_{33}	—	August 10, 2001	Palomar	NEAT	·	1.0 km	MPC · JPL
200574	2001 PV_{34}	—	August 10, 2001	Palomar	NEAT	·	980 m	MPC · JPL
200575	2001 QB_{6}	—	August 16, 2001	Socorro	LINEAR	·	1.2 km	MPC · JPL
200576	2001 QY_{17}	—	August 16, 2001	Socorro	LINEAR	·	1.4 km	MPC · JPL
200577	2001 QT_{61}	—	August 16, 2001	Socorro	LINEAR	·	1.1 km	MPC · JPL
200578 Yungchuen	2001 QW_{94}	Yungchuen	August 23, 2001	Desert Eagle	W. K. Y. Yeung	·	750 m	MPC · JPL
200579	2001 QF_{105}	—	August 23, 2001	Socorro	LINEAR	·	1.0 km	MPC · JPL
200580	2001 QJ_{107}	—	August 23, 2001	Socorro	LINEAR	PHO	1.5 km	MPC · JPL
200581	2001 QG_{140}	—	August 22, 2001	Socorro	LINEAR	·	1.5 km	MPC · JPL
200582	2001 QT_{155}	—	August 23, 2001	Anderson Mesa	LONEOS	·	780 m	MPC · JPL
200583	2001 QZ_{159}	—	August 23, 2001	Anderson Mesa	LONEOS	·	1.2 km	MPC · JPL
200584	2001 QV_{163}	—	August 31, 2001	Desert Eagle	W. K. Y. Yeung	·	1.4 km	MPC · JPL
200585	2001 QE_{192}	—	August 22, 2001	Socorro	LINEAR	·	5.9 km	MPC · JPL
200586	2001 QA_{208}	—	August 23, 2001	Anderson Mesa	LONEOS	·	880 m	MPC · JPL
200587	2001 QU_{212}	—	August 23, 2001	Anderson Mesa	LONEOS	·	890 m	MPC · JPL
200588	2001 QC_{293}	—	August 26, 2001	Socorro	LINEAR	PHO	1.7 km	MPC · JPL
200589	2001 RQ_{12}	—	September 8, 2001	Socorro	LINEAR	·	680 m	MPC · JPL
200590	2001 RU_{15}	—	September 8, 2001	Socorro	LINEAR	·	860 m	MPC · JPL
200591	2001 RB_{20}	—	September 7, 2001	Socorro	LINEAR	·	1.0 km	MPC · JPL
200592	2001 RR_{28}	—	September 7, 2001	Socorro	LINEAR	·	990 m	MPC · JPL
200593	2001 RT_{57}	—	September 12, 2001	Socorro	LINEAR	·	2.2 km	MPC · JPL
200594	2001 RG_{69}	—	September 10, 2001	Socorro	LINEAR	·	1.5 km	MPC · JPL
200595	2001 RD_{70}	—	September 10, 2001	Socorro	LINEAR	·	930 m	MPC · JPL
200596	2001 RX_{70}	—	September 10, 2001	Socorro	LINEAR	·	2.5 km	MPC · JPL
200597	2001 RA_{77}	—	September 10, 2001	Socorro	LINEAR	·	1.4 km	MPC · JPL
200598	2001 RX_{90}	—	September 11, 2001	Anderson Mesa	LONEOS	·	1.3 km	MPC · JPL
200599	2001 RB_{95}	—	September 11, 2001	Anderson Mesa	LONEOS	·	1.4 km	MPC · JPL
200600	2001 RX_{98}	—	September 12, 2001	Socorro	LINEAR	·	1.0 km	MPC · JPL

== 200601–200700 ==
back to top

Designation			Discovery			Properties		Ref
Permanent	Provisional	Named after	Date	Site	Discoverer(s)	Category	Diam.	Ref
200601	2001 RT_{109}	—	September 12, 2001	Socorro	LINEAR	·	850 m	MPC · JPL
200602	2001 RY_{109}	—	September 12, 2001	Socorro	LINEAR	·	5.6 km	MPC · JPL
200603	2001 RO_{129}	—	September 12, 2001	Socorro	LINEAR	·	990 m	MPC · JPL
200604	2001 RH_{135}	—	September 12, 2001	Socorro	LINEAR	·	1.1 km	MPC · JPL
200605	2001 RQ_{139}	—	September 12, 2001	Socorro	LINEAR	·	1.1 km	MPC · JPL
200606	2001 RJ_{142}	—	September 12, 2001	Socorro	LINEAR	PHO	2.4 km	MPC · JPL
200607	2001 RG_{145}	—	September 7, 2001	Anderson Mesa	LONEOS	·	1.1 km	MPC · JPL
200608	2001 RW_{148}	—	September 10, 2001	Anderson Mesa	LONEOS	·	1.1 km	MPC · JPL
200609	2001 RS_{151}	—	September 11, 2001	Anderson Mesa	LONEOS	·	980 m	MPC · JPL
200610	2001 RB_{156}	—	September 12, 2001	Palomar	NEAT	·	1.5 km	MPC · JPL
200611	2001 SS_{3}	—	September 16, 2001	Socorro	LINEAR	HYG	4.2 km	MPC · JPL
200612	2001 SH_{16}	—	September 16, 2001	Socorro	LINEAR	·	940 m	MPC · JPL
200613	2001 SE_{25}	—	September 16, 2001	Socorro	LINEAR	·	5.2 km	MPC · JPL
200614	2001 SV_{28}	—	September 16, 2001	Socorro	LINEAR	·	1.1 km	MPC · JPL
200615	2001 SA_{31}	—	September 16, 2001	Socorro	LINEAR	·	1.0 km	MPC · JPL
200616	2001 SX_{45}	—	September 16, 2001	Socorro	LINEAR	·	910 m	MPC · JPL
200617	2001 ST_{50}	—	September 16, 2001	Socorro	LINEAR	(1338) (FLO)	1.2 km	MPC · JPL
200618	2001 SG_{67}	—	September 17, 2001	Socorro	LINEAR	·	910 m	MPC · JPL
200619	2001 ST_{73}	—	September 20, 2001	Desert Eagle	W. K. Y. Yeung	·	1.3 km	MPC · JPL
200620	2001 SO_{79}	—	September 20, 2001	Socorro	LINEAR	LIX	5.9 km	MPC · JPL
200621	2001 SA_{92}	—	September 20, 2001	Socorro	LINEAR	·	1.0 km	MPC · JPL
200622	2001 SF_{101}	—	September 20, 2001	Socorro	LINEAR	·	1.0 km	MPC · JPL
200623	2001 SO_{101}	—	September 20, 2001	Socorro	LINEAR	·	850 m	MPC · JPL
200624	2001 SJ_{102}	—	September 20, 2001	Socorro	LINEAR	·	770 m	MPC · JPL
200625	2001 SH_{113}	—	September 20, 2001	Desert Eagle	W. K. Y. Yeung	·	840 m	MPC · JPL
200626	2001 SC_{117}	—	September 16, 2001	Socorro	LINEAR	·	6.4 km	MPC · JPL
200627	2001 SA_{121}	—	September 16, 2001	Socorro	LINEAR	·	990 m	MPC · JPL
200628	2001 SL_{139}	—	September 16, 2001	Socorro	LINEAR	NYS	1.4 km	MPC · JPL
200629	2001 SK_{160}	—	September 17, 2001	Socorro	LINEAR	·	1.3 km	MPC · JPL
200630	2001 SM_{164}	—	September 17, 2001	Socorro	LINEAR	·	1.4 km	MPC · JPL
200631	2001 SB_{167}	—	September 19, 2001	Socorro	LINEAR	·	1.2 km	MPC · JPL
200632	2001 SD_{179}	—	September 17, 2001	Socorro	LINEAR	·	1.8 km	MPC · JPL
200633	2001 SA_{181}	—	September 19, 2001	Socorro	LINEAR	·	720 m	MPC · JPL
200634	2001 SJ_{195}	—	September 19, 2001	Socorro	LINEAR	·	2.6 km	MPC · JPL
200635	2001 ST_{208}	—	September 19, 2001	Socorro	LINEAR	·	910 m	MPC · JPL
200636	2001 SD_{210}	—	September 19, 2001	Socorro	LINEAR	·	880 m	MPC · JPL
200637	2001 SL_{215}	—	September 19, 2001	Socorro	LINEAR	·	1.3 km	MPC · JPL
200638	2001 SF_{228}	—	September 19, 2001	Socorro	LINEAR	·	800 m	MPC · JPL
200639	2001 SU_{238}	—	September 19, 2001	Socorro	LINEAR	·	830 m	MPC · JPL
200640	2001 SH_{244}	—	September 19, 2001	Socorro	LINEAR	·	820 m	MPC · JPL
200641	2001 SJ_{246}	—	September 19, 2001	Socorro	LINEAR	·	1.1 km	MPC · JPL
200642	2001 SN_{261}	—	September 20, 2001	Socorro	LINEAR	·	1.3 km	MPC · JPL
200643	2001 SH_{283}	—	September 27, 2001	Socorro	LINEAR	PHO	1.7 km	MPC · JPL
200644	2001 SS_{302}	—	September 20, 2001	Socorro	LINEAR	·	970 m	MPC · JPL
200645	2001 SA_{313}	—	September 21, 2001	Socorro	LINEAR	·	930 m	MPC · JPL
200646	2001 SX_{317}	—	September 19, 2001	Socorro	LINEAR	·	770 m	MPC · JPL
200647	2001 SF_{327}	—	September 18, 2001	Anderson Mesa	LONEOS	·	970 m	MPC · JPL
200648	2001 TU_{1}	—	October 6, 2001	Socorro	LINEAR	·	900 m	MPC · JPL
200649	2001 TP_{2}	—	October 6, 2001	Palomar	NEAT	·	810 m	MPC · JPL
200650	2001 TQ_{2}	—	October 6, 2001	Palomar	NEAT	·	980 m	MPC · JPL
200651	2001 TC_{5}	—	October 8, 2001	Palomar	NEAT	·	740 m	MPC · JPL
200652	2001 TY_{11}	—	October 13, 2001	Socorro	LINEAR	V	820 m	MPC · JPL
200653	2001 TM_{14}	—	October 7, 2001	Palomar	NEAT	·	1.2 km	MPC · JPL
200654	2001 TN_{17}	—	October 14, 2001	Goodricke-Pigott	R. A. Tucker	·	1.3 km	MPC · JPL
200655	2001 TT_{21}	—	October 11, 2001	Socorro	LINEAR	·	1.3 km	MPC · JPL
200656	2001 TA_{27}	—	October 14, 2001	Socorro	LINEAR	·	1.7 km	MPC · JPL
200657	2001 TF_{27}	—	October 14, 2001	Socorro	LINEAR	·	1.2 km	MPC · JPL
200658	2001 TP_{36}	—	October 14, 2001	Socorro	LINEAR	PHO	1.9 km	MPC · JPL
200659	2001 TU_{39}	—	October 14, 2001	Socorro	LINEAR	·	1.3 km	MPC · JPL
200660	2001 TK_{45}	—	October 14, 2001	Desert Eagle	W. K. Y. Yeung	·	1.2 km	MPC · JPL
200661	2001 TD_{49}	—	October 14, 2001	Desert Eagle	W. K. Y. Yeung	·	1.4 km	MPC · JPL
200662	2001 TL_{51}	—	October 13, 2001	Socorro	LINEAR	·	1.2 km	MPC · JPL
200663	2001 TP_{63}	—	October 13, 2001	Socorro	LINEAR	·	1 km	MPC · JPL
200664	2001 TZ_{85}	—	October 14, 2001	Socorro	LINEAR	·	950 m	MPC · JPL
200665	2001 TQ_{90}	—	October 14, 2001	Socorro	LINEAR	·	1.1 km	MPC · JPL
200666	2001 TX_{99}	—	October 14, 2001	Socorro	LINEAR	·	920 m	MPC · JPL
200667	2001 TF_{100}	—	October 14, 2001	Socorro	LINEAR	·	3.1 km	MPC · JPL
200668	2001 TG_{101}	—	October 14, 2001	Socorro	LINEAR	(2076)	1.6 km	MPC · JPL
200669	2001 TL_{114}	—	October 14, 2001	Socorro	LINEAR	·	1.4 km	MPC · JPL
200670	2001 TN_{124}	—	October 12, 2001	Haleakala	NEAT	·	1.3 km	MPC · JPL
200671	2001 TE_{127}	—	October 13, 2001	Kitt Peak	Spacewatch	V	880 m	MPC · JPL
200672	2001 TG_{128}	—	October 11, 2001	Palomar	NEAT	·	830 m	MPC · JPL
200673	2001 TH_{128}	—	October 11, 2001	Palomar	NEAT	·	940 m	MPC · JPL
200674	2001 TJ_{145}	—	October 10, 2001	Palomar	NEAT	·	990 m	MPC · JPL
200675	2001 TA_{154}	—	October 15, 2001	Palomar	NEAT	·	850 m	MPC · JPL
200676	2001 TZ_{161}	—	October 11, 2001	Palomar	NEAT	·	1.3 km	MPC · JPL
200677	2001 TV_{172}	—	October 13, 2001	Socorro	LINEAR	·	860 m	MPC · JPL
200678	2001 TB_{179}	—	October 14, 2001	Socorro	LINEAR	·	4.2 km	MPC · JPL
200679	2001 TX_{181}	—	October 14, 2001	Socorro	LINEAR	·	1.4 km	MPC · JPL
200680	2001 TB_{186}	—	October 14, 2001	Socorro	LINEAR	·	1.2 km	MPC · JPL
200681	2001 TB_{189}	—	October 14, 2001	Socorro	LINEAR	·	1.2 km	MPC · JPL
200682	2001 TD_{190}	—	October 14, 2001	Socorro	LINEAR	·	1.6 km	MPC · JPL
200683	2001 TP_{201}	—	October 11, 2001	Socorro	LINEAR	·	1.1 km	MPC · JPL
200684	2001 TN_{215}	—	October 13, 2001	Palomar	NEAT	·	5.6 km	MPC · JPL
200685	2001 TG_{219}	—	October 14, 2001	Anderson Mesa	LONEOS	CYB	5.9 km	MPC · JPL
200686	2001 TO_{227}	—	October 15, 2001	Socorro	LINEAR	·	1.9 km	MPC · JPL
200687	2001 TS_{230}	—	October 15, 2001	Kitt Peak	Spacewatch	·	930 m	MPC · JPL
200688	2001 UK_{1}	—	October 19, 2001	Nacogdoches	Stephen F. Austin State University Observatory	·	1.2 km	MPC · JPL
200689	2001 UY_{1}	—	October 17, 2001	Socorro	LINEAR	·	1.1 km	MPC · JPL
200690	2001 UG_{22}	—	October 17, 2001	Socorro	LINEAR	·	1.3 km	MPC · JPL
200691	2001 UQ_{25}	—	October 18, 2001	Socorro	LINEAR	V	980 m	MPC · JPL
200692	2001 UQ_{31}	—	October 16, 2001	Socorro	LINEAR	NYS	1.5 km	MPC · JPL
200693	2001 UU_{38}	—	October 17, 2001	Socorro	LINEAR	·	980 m	MPC · JPL
200694	2001 UB_{58}	—	October 17, 2001	Socorro	LINEAR	·	1.2 km	MPC · JPL
200695	2001 UD_{58}	—	October 17, 2001	Socorro	LINEAR	·	1.1 km	MPC · JPL
200696	2001 UW_{59}	—	October 17, 2001	Socorro	LINEAR	·	850 m	MPC · JPL
200697	2001 UQ_{69}	—	October 17, 2001	Kitt Peak	Spacewatch	·	1.0 km	MPC · JPL
200698	2001 UW_{70}	—	October 17, 2001	Kitt Peak	Spacewatch	·	820 m	MPC · JPL
200699	2001 UR_{74}	—	October 17, 2001	Socorro	LINEAR	·	1.2 km	MPC · JPL
200700	2001 UC_{79}	—	October 20, 2001	Socorro	LINEAR	·	1.4 km	MPC · JPL

== 200701–200800 ==
back to top

Designation			Discovery			Properties		Ref
Permanent	Provisional	Named after	Date	Site	Discoverer(s)	Category	Diam.	Ref
200701	2001 UN_{79}	—	October 20, 2001	Socorro	LINEAR	·	1.0 km	MPC · JPL
200702	2001 UT_{79}	—	October 20, 2001	Socorro	LINEAR	·	890 m	MPC · JPL
200703	2001 UN_{94}	—	October 19, 2001	Haleakala	NEAT	V	1.0 km	MPC · JPL
200704	2001 UH_{116}	—	October 22, 2001	Socorro	LINEAR	·	1.7 km	MPC · JPL
200705	2001 UL_{131}	—	October 20, 2001	Socorro	LINEAR	V	870 m	MPC · JPL
200706	2001 UN_{137}	—	October 23, 2001	Socorro	LINEAR	·	680 m	MPC · JPL
200707	2001 UC_{138}	—	October 23, 2001	Socorro	LINEAR	·	810 m	MPC · JPL
200708	2001 UU_{141}	—	October 23, 2001	Socorro	LINEAR	·	890 m	MPC · JPL
200709	2001 UO_{149}	—	October 23, 2001	Socorro	LINEAR	·	1.0 km	MPC · JPL
200710	2001 UN_{153}	—	October 23, 2001	Socorro	LINEAR	slow	1.5 km	MPC · JPL
200711	2001 UX_{160}	—	October 23, 2001	Socorro	LINEAR	·	1.3 km	MPC · JPL
200712	2001 UG_{162}	—	October 23, 2001	Socorro	LINEAR	·	1.2 km	MPC · JPL
200713	2001 UC_{163}	—	October 23, 2001	Socorro	LINEAR	NYS	1.9 km	MPC · JPL
200714	2001 UP_{165}	—	October 23, 2001	Palomar	NEAT	·	1.4 km	MPC · JPL
200715	2001 UO_{174}	—	October 18, 2001	Palomar	NEAT	·	990 m	MPC · JPL
200716	2001 UZ_{194}	—	October 18, 2001	Palomar	NEAT	·	1.7 km	MPC · JPL
200717	2001 UT_{206}	—	October 20, 2001	Socorro	LINEAR	·	2.7 km	MPC · JPL
200718	2001 UL_{219}	—	October 16, 2001	Socorro	LINEAR	·	940 m	MPC · JPL
200719	2001 UD_{221}	—	October 21, 2001	Socorro	LINEAR	·	1.5 km	MPC · JPL
200720	2001 UP_{221}	—	October 24, 2001	Socorro	LINEAR	·	990 m	MPC · JPL
200721	2001 VB_{5}	—	November 11, 2001	Socorro	LINEAR	PHO	2.3 km	MPC · JPL
200722	2001 VM_{8}	—	November 9, 2001	Socorro	LINEAR	·	1.0 km	MPC · JPL
200723	2001 VO_{9}	—	November 9, 2001	Socorro	LINEAR	·	820 m	MPC · JPL
200724	2001 VZ_{27}	—	November 9, 2001	Socorro	LINEAR	·	2.2 km	MPC · JPL
200725	2001 VV_{36}	—	November 9, 2001	Socorro	LINEAR	·	1.7 km	MPC · JPL
200726	2001 VD_{41}	—	November 9, 2001	Socorro	LINEAR	·	1.1 km	MPC · JPL
200727	2001 VW_{45}	—	November 9, 2001	Socorro	LINEAR	·	1.3 km	MPC · JPL
200728	2001 VF_{48}	—	November 9, 2001	Socorro	LINEAR	·	2.8 km	MPC · JPL
200729	2001 VR_{50}	—	November 10, 2001	Socorro	LINEAR	·	980 m	MPC · JPL
200730	2001 VV_{53}	—	November 10, 2001	Socorro	LINEAR	·	1.1 km	MPC · JPL
200731	2001 VW_{53}	—	November 10, 2001	Socorro	LINEAR	·	1.2 km	MPC · JPL
200732	2001 VE_{54}	—	November 10, 2001	Socorro	LINEAR	·	1.3 km	MPC · JPL
200733	2001 VA_{57}	—	November 10, 2001	Socorro	LINEAR	·	1.2 km	MPC · JPL
200734	2001 VU_{59}	—	November 10, 2001	Socorro	LINEAR	·	1.2 km	MPC · JPL
200735	2001 VV_{64}	—	November 10, 2001	Socorro	LINEAR	·	1.3 km	MPC · JPL
200736	2001 VE_{67}	—	November 10, 2001	Socorro	LINEAR	·	1.5 km	MPC · JPL
200737	2001 VH_{67}	—	November 10, 2001	Socorro	LINEAR	·	1.1 km	MPC · JPL
200738	2001 VX_{70}	—	November 11, 2001	Socorro	LINEAR	·	1.5 km	MPC · JPL
200739	2001 VD_{86}	—	November 12, 2001	Socorro	LINEAR	·	930 m	MPC · JPL
200740	2001 VG_{95}	—	November 15, 2001	Socorro	LINEAR	·	1.8 km	MPC · JPL
200741	2001 VD_{103}	—	November 12, 2001	Socorro	LINEAR	NYS	2.6 km	MPC · JPL
200742	2001 VS_{105}	—	November 12, 2001	Socorro	LINEAR	·	1.2 km	MPC · JPL
200743	2001 VP_{110}	—	November 12, 2001	Socorro	LINEAR	·	1.1 km	MPC · JPL
200744	2001 VA_{112}	—	November 12, 2001	Socorro	LINEAR	·	990 m	MPC · JPL
200745	2001 VA_{115}	—	November 12, 2001	Socorro	LINEAR	·	1.3 km	MPC · JPL
200746	2001 VA_{118}	—	November 12, 2001	Socorro	LINEAR	·	1.6 km	MPC · JPL
200747	2001 VB_{119}	—	November 12, 2001	Socorro	LINEAR	MAS	820 m	MPC · JPL
200748	2001 VB_{126}	—	November 14, 2001	Kitt Peak	Spacewatch	NYS	1.4 km	MPC · JPL
200749	2001 VF_{126}	—	November 14, 2001	Kitt Peak	Spacewatch	·	990 m	MPC · JPL
200750 Rix	2001 VB_{128}	Rix	November 11, 2001	Apache Point	SDSS	·	1.1 km	MPC · JPL
200751	2001 WE_{6}	—	November 17, 2001	Socorro	LINEAR	·	920 m	MPC · JPL
200752	2001 WG_{6}	—	November 17, 2001	Socorro	LINEAR	·	1.3 km	MPC · JPL
200753	2001 WW_{6}	—	November 17, 2001	Socorro	LINEAR	·	1.3 km	MPC · JPL
200754	2001 WA_{25}	—	November 27, 2001	Socorro	LINEAR	APO	550 m	MPC · JPL
200755	2001 WX_{25}	—	November 17, 2001	Socorro	LINEAR	·	1.3 km	MPC · JPL
200756	2001 WR_{32}	—	November 17, 2001	Socorro	LINEAR	·	1.3 km	MPC · JPL
200757	2001 WO_{39}	—	November 17, 2001	Socorro	LINEAR	·	1.7 km	MPC · JPL
200758	2001 WE_{43}	—	November 18, 2001	Socorro	LINEAR	·	1.0 km	MPC · JPL
200759	2001 WM_{47}	—	November 17, 2001	Anderson Mesa	LONEOS	PHO	2.2 km	MPC · JPL
200760	2001 WE_{72}	—	November 20, 2001	Socorro	LINEAR	·	790 m	MPC · JPL
200761	2001 WL_{92}	—	November 21, 2001	Socorro	LINEAR	·	930 m	MPC · JPL
200762	2001 XX	—	December 4, 2001	Socorro	LINEAR	·	1.5 km	MPC · JPL
200763	2001 XY_{2}	—	December 9, 2001	Socorro	LINEAR	·	2.9 km	MPC · JPL
200764	2001 XP_{3}	—	December 8, 2001	Socorro	LINEAR	PHO	2.0 km	MPC · JPL
200765	2001 XW_{3}	—	December 9, 2001	Socorro	LINEAR	PHO	1.7 km	MPC · JPL
200766	2001 XY_{4}	—	December 8, 2001	Uccle	H. M. J. Boffin	PHO	1.8 km	MPC · JPL
200767	2001 XM_{9}	—	December 9, 2001	Socorro	LINEAR	·	1.5 km	MPC · JPL
200768	2001 XM_{15}	—	December 10, 2001	Socorro	LINEAR	·	1.5 km	MPC · JPL
200769	2001 XY_{15}	—	December 10, 2001	Socorro	LINEAR	·	1.5 km	MPC · JPL
200770	2001 XY_{18}	—	December 9, 2001	Socorro	LINEAR	V	1.2 km	MPC · JPL
200771	2001 XK_{19}	—	December 9, 2001	Socorro	LINEAR	·	1.7 km	MPC · JPL
200772	2001 XJ_{23}	—	December 9, 2001	Socorro	LINEAR	V	1.1 km	MPC · JPL
200773	2001 XL_{32}	—	December 7, 2001	Kitt Peak	Spacewatch	·	930 m	MPC · JPL
200774	2001 XT_{36}	—	December 9, 2001	Socorro	LINEAR	·	1.4 km	MPC · JPL
200775	2001 XE_{37}	—	December 9, 2001	Socorro	LINEAR	V	1.3 km	MPC · JPL
200776	2001 XE_{42}	—	December 9, 2001	Socorro	LINEAR	PHO	1.2 km	MPC · JPL
200777	2001 XX_{44}	—	December 9, 2001	Socorro	LINEAR	V	1.1 km	MPC · JPL
200778	2001 XG_{49}	—	December 10, 2001	Socorro	LINEAR	·	1.7 km	MPC · JPL
200779	2001 XZ_{49}	—	December 14, 2001	Socorro	LINEAR	·	1.3 km	MPC · JPL
200780	2001 XL_{50}	—	December 10, 2001	Socorro	LINEAR	·	950 m	MPC · JPL
200781	2001 XS_{54}	—	December 10, 2001	Socorro	LINEAR	·	1.2 km	MPC · JPL
200782	2001 XA_{55}	—	December 10, 2001	Socorro	LINEAR	NYS	1.3 km	MPC · JPL
200783	2001 XK_{60}	—	December 10, 2001	Socorro	LINEAR	NYS	1.6 km	MPC · JPL
200784	2001 XF_{65}	—	December 10, 2001	Socorro	LINEAR	NYS	1.6 km	MPC · JPL
200785	2001 XU_{65}	—	December 10, 2001	Socorro	LINEAR	(2076)	2.3 km	MPC · JPL
200786	2001 XZ_{75}	—	December 11, 2001	Socorro	LINEAR	·	830 m	MPC · JPL
200787	2001 XG_{82}	—	December 11, 2001	Socorro	LINEAR	·	920 m	MPC · JPL
200788	2001 XZ_{82}	—	December 11, 2001	Socorro	LINEAR	·	1.4 km	MPC · JPL
200789	2001 XV_{85}	—	December 11, 2001	Socorro	LINEAR	·	1.9 km	MPC · JPL
200790	2001 XD_{88}	—	December 14, 2001	Desert Eagle	W. K. Y. Yeung	·	1.5 km	MPC · JPL
200791	2001 XS_{91}	—	December 10, 2001	Socorro	LINEAR	·	880 m	MPC · JPL
200792	2001 XH_{92}	—	December 10, 2001	Socorro	LINEAR	·	950 m	MPC · JPL
200793	2001 XK_{97}	—	December 10, 2001	Socorro	LINEAR	·	1.3 km	MPC · JPL
200794	2001 XC_{100}	—	December 10, 2001	Socorro	LINEAR	·	980 m	MPC · JPL
200795	2001 XH_{102}	—	December 11, 2001	Socorro	LINEAR	·	1.3 km	MPC · JPL
200796	2001 XG_{104}	—	December 15, 2001	Socorro	LINEAR	PHO	1.3 km	MPC · JPL
200797	2001 XW_{110}	—	December 11, 2001	Socorro	LINEAR	NYS	1.0 km	MPC · JPL
200798	2001 XD_{116}	—	December 13, 2001	Socorro	LINEAR	·	1.6 km	MPC · JPL
200799	2001 XU_{117}	—	December 13, 2001	Socorro	LINEAR	·	2.0 km	MPC · JPL
200800	2001 XY_{120}	—	December 14, 2001	Socorro	LINEAR	·	970 m	MPC · JPL

== 200801–200900 ==
back to top

Designation			Discovery			Properties		Ref
Permanent	Provisional	Named after	Date	Site	Discoverer(s)	Category	Diam.	Ref
200801	2001 XD_{133}	—	December 14, 2001	Socorro	LINEAR	NYS	1.4 km	MPC · JPL
200802	2001 XU_{135}	—	December 14, 2001	Socorro	LINEAR	·	1.0 km	MPC · JPL
200803	2001 XJ_{142}	—	December 14, 2001	Socorro	LINEAR	slow	1.2 km	MPC · JPL
200804	2001 XO_{143}	—	December 14, 2001	Socorro	LINEAR	V	970 m	MPC · JPL
200805	2001 XZ_{150}	—	December 14, 2001	Socorro	LINEAR	·	1.2 km	MPC · JPL
200806	2001 XU_{151}	—	December 14, 2001	Socorro	LINEAR	·	1.1 km	MPC · JPL
200807	2001 XZ_{163}	—	December 14, 2001	Socorro	LINEAR	·	1.5 km	MPC · JPL
200808	2001 XD_{166}	—	December 14, 2001	Socorro	LINEAR	·	1.2 km	MPC · JPL
200809	2001 XL_{173}	—	December 14, 2001	Socorro	LINEAR	NYS	1.4 km	MPC · JPL
200810	2001 XR_{173}	—	December 14, 2001	Socorro	LINEAR	V	1.1 km	MPC · JPL
200811	2001 XO_{174}	—	December 14, 2001	Socorro	LINEAR	·	1.6 km	MPC · JPL
200812	2001 XG_{178}	—	December 14, 2001	Socorro	LINEAR	·	2.2 km	MPC · JPL
200813	2001 XE_{179}	—	December 14, 2001	Socorro	LINEAR	·	1.1 km	MPC · JPL
200814	2001 XJ_{179}	—	December 14, 2001	Socorro	LINEAR	·	1.0 km	MPC · JPL
200815	2001 XF_{181}	—	December 14, 2001	Socorro	LINEAR	V	1.2 km	MPC · JPL
200816	2001 XQ_{181}	—	December 14, 2001	Socorro	LINEAR	·	1.0 km	MPC · JPL
200817	2001 XO_{187}	—	December 14, 2001	Socorro	LINEAR	·	1.8 km	MPC · JPL
200818	2001 XD_{188}	—	December 14, 2001	Socorro	LINEAR	V	900 m	MPC · JPL
200819	2001 XF_{189}	—	December 14, 2001	Socorro	LINEAR	NYS	1.5 km	MPC · JPL
200820	2001 XM_{189}	—	December 14, 2001	Socorro	LINEAR	·	1.9 km	MPC · JPL
200821	2001 XM_{208}	—	December 11, 2001	Socorro	LINEAR	(2076)	1.3 km	MPC · JPL
200822	2001 XG_{210}	—	December 11, 2001	Socorro	LINEAR	·	2.2 km	MPC · JPL
200823	2001 XS_{211}	—	December 11, 2001	Socorro	LINEAR	·	1.6 km	MPC · JPL
200824	2001 XL_{216}	—	December 14, 2001	Socorro	LINEAR	V	1.0 km	MPC · JPL
200825	2001 XN_{219}	—	December 15, 2001	Socorro	LINEAR	·	1.3 km	MPC · JPL
200826	2001 XM_{220}	—	December 15, 2001	Socorro	LINEAR	V	950 m	MPC · JPL
200827	2001 XU_{220}	—	December 15, 2001	Socorro	LINEAR	V	990 m	MPC · JPL
200828	2001 XE_{223}	—	December 15, 2001	Socorro	LINEAR	·	1.3 km	MPC · JPL
200829	2001 XB_{225}	—	December 15, 2001	Socorro	LINEAR	V	1.1 km	MPC · JPL
200830	2001 XK_{232}	—	December 15, 2001	Socorro	LINEAR	·	1.3 km	MPC · JPL
200831	2001 XL_{234}	—	December 15, 2001	Socorro	LINEAR	V	1.0 km	MPC · JPL
200832	2001 XC_{238}	—	December 15, 2001	Socorro	LINEAR	·	2.3 km	MPC · JPL
200833	2001 XY_{238}	—	December 15, 2001	Socorro	LINEAR	·	1.6 km	MPC · JPL
200834	2001 XZ_{238}	—	December 15, 2001	Socorro	LINEAR	·	1.6 km	MPC · JPL
200835	2001 XF_{239}	—	December 15, 2001	Socorro	LINEAR	·	2.0 km	MPC · JPL
200836	2001 XW_{239}	—	December 15, 2001	Socorro	LINEAR	·	2.1 km	MPC · JPL
200837	2001 XQ_{242}	—	December 14, 2001	Socorro	LINEAR	V	1.2 km	MPC · JPL
200838	2001 XG_{245}	—	December 15, 2001	Socorro	LINEAR	·	800 m	MPC · JPL
200839	2001 XO_{247}	—	December 15, 2001	Socorro	LINEAR	·	1.3 km	MPC · JPL
200840	2001 XN_{254}	—	December 9, 2001	Mauna Kea	S. S. Sheppard	AMO +1km · PHA	980 m	MPC · JPL
200841	2001 XD_{256}	—	December 5, 2001	Haleakala	NEAT	PHO	1.6 km	MPC · JPL
200842	2001 XR_{264}	—	December 14, 2001	Socorro	LINEAR	(1338) (FLO)	1.1 km	MPC · JPL
200843	2001 XD_{266}	—	December 14, 2001	Socorro	LINEAR	NYS	1.1 km	MPC · JPL
200844	2001 YW_{9}	—	December 17, 2001	Socorro	LINEAR	·	1.2 km	MPC · JPL
200845	2001 YW_{10}	—	December 17, 2001	Socorro	LINEAR	·	1.3 km	MPC · JPL
200846	2001 YG_{14}	—	December 17, 2001	Socorro	LINEAR	·	2.3 km	MPC · JPL
200847	2001 YW_{14}	—	December 17, 2001	Socorro	LINEAR	·	2.4 km	MPC · JPL
200848	2001 YT_{16}	—	December 17, 2001	Socorro	LINEAR	·	1.3 km	MPC · JPL
200849	2001 YH_{18}	—	December 17, 2001	Socorro	LINEAR	·	1.6 km	MPC · JPL
200850	2001 YX_{20}	—	December 18, 2001	Socorro	LINEAR	V	1.2 km	MPC · JPL
200851	2001 YK_{30}	—	December 18, 2001	Socorro	LINEAR	V	990 m	MPC · JPL
200852	2001 YD_{35}	—	December 18, 2001	Socorro	LINEAR	·	1.4 km	MPC · JPL
200853	2001 YP_{44}	—	December 18, 2001	Socorro	LINEAR	(2076)	1.4 km	MPC · JPL
200854	2001 YG_{54}	—	December 18, 2001	Socorro	LINEAR	·	1.5 km	MPC · JPL
200855	2001 YB_{58}	—	December 18, 2001	Socorro	LINEAR	NYS	1.2 km	MPC · JPL
200856	2001 YF_{62}	—	December 18, 2001	Socorro	LINEAR	·	1.2 km	MPC · JPL
200857	2001 YD_{63}	—	December 18, 2001	Socorro	LINEAR	·	1.5 km	MPC · JPL
200858	2001 YR_{63}	—	December 18, 2001	Socorro	LINEAR	V	1.1 km	MPC · JPL
200859	2001 YG_{69}	—	December 18, 2001	Socorro	LINEAR	MAS	930 m	MPC · JPL
200860	2001 YB_{70}	—	December 18, 2001	Socorro	LINEAR	NYS	1.6 km	MPC · JPL
200861	2001 YW_{70}	—	December 18, 2001	Socorro	LINEAR	(2076)	1.3 km	MPC · JPL
200862	2001 YY_{70}	—	December 18, 2001	Socorro	LINEAR	V	920 m	MPC · JPL
200863	2001 YT_{72}	—	December 18, 2001	Socorro	LINEAR	·	1.3 km	MPC · JPL
200864	2001 YC_{75}	—	December 18, 2001	Socorro	LINEAR	V	1.1 km	MPC · JPL
200865	2001 YH_{78}	—	December 18, 2001	Socorro	LINEAR	·	3.0 km	MPC · JPL
200866	2001 YA_{80}	—	December 18, 2001	Socorro	LINEAR	·	890 m	MPC · JPL
200867	2001 YA_{83}	—	December 18, 2001	Socorro	LINEAR	·	2.3 km	MPC · JPL
200868	2001 YU_{84}	—	December 18, 2001	Socorro	LINEAR	·	1.9 km	MPC · JPL
200869	2001 YV_{84}	—	December 18, 2001	Socorro	LINEAR	·	2.1 km	MPC · JPL
200870	2001 YU_{86}	—	December 18, 2001	Socorro	LINEAR	NYS	1.8 km	MPC · JPL
200871	2001 YW_{88}	—	December 18, 2001	Socorro	LINEAR	·	1.2 km	MPC · JPL
200872	2001 YX_{89}	—	December 18, 2001	Socorro	LINEAR	MAS	970 m	MPC · JPL
200873	2001 YS_{98}	—	December 17, 2001	Socorro	LINEAR	NYS	1.9 km	MPC · JPL
200874	2001 YV_{104}	—	December 17, 2001	Socorro	LINEAR	·	1.4 km	MPC · JPL
200875	2001 YL_{106}	—	December 17, 2001	Socorro	LINEAR	·	2.0 km	MPC · JPL
200876	2001 YV_{106}	—	December 17, 2001	Socorro	LINEAR	·	1.4 km	MPC · JPL
200877	2001 YC_{108}	—	December 17, 2001	Socorro	LINEAR	·	1.6 km	MPC · JPL
200878	2001 YQ_{116}	—	December 18, 2001	Socorro	LINEAR	·	1.3 km	MPC · JPL
200879	2001 YC_{125}	—	December 17, 2001	Socorro	LINEAR	V	1.2 km	MPC · JPL
200880	2001 YD_{126}	—	December 17, 2001	Socorro	LINEAR	V	1.1 km	MPC · JPL
200881	2001 YG_{126}	—	December 17, 2001	Socorro	LINEAR	·	2.1 km	MPC · JPL
200882	2001 YT_{127}	—	December 17, 2001	Socorro	LINEAR	(1338) (FLO)	1.1 km	MPC · JPL
200883	2001 YJ_{131}	—	December 18, 2001	Socorro	LINEAR	·	1.3 km	MPC · JPL
200884	2001 YS_{135}	—	December 20, 2001	Socorro	LINEAR	·	1.9 km	MPC · JPL
200885	2001 YX_{147}	—	December 18, 2001	Anderson Mesa	LONEOS	·	3.4 km	MPC · JPL
200886	2002 AJ_{9}	—	January 10, 2002	Oaxaca	Roe, J. M.	NYS	2.0 km	MPC · JPL
200887	2002 AY_{11}	—	January 10, 2002	Campo Imperatore	CINEOS	NYS	1.8 km	MPC · JPL
200888	2002 AJ_{12}	—	January 10, 2002	Campo Imperatore	CINEOS	NYS	990 m	MPC · JPL
200889	2002 AS_{12}	—	January 10, 2002	Campo Imperatore	CINEOS	NYS	1.6 km	MPC · JPL
200890	2002 AS_{15}	—	January 8, 2002	Socorro	LINEAR	·	3.2 km	MPC · JPL
200891	2002 AE_{17}	—	January 14, 2002	Socorro	LINEAR	·	2.2 km	MPC · JPL
200892	2002 AU_{22}	—	January 5, 2002	Palomar	NEAT	NYS	1.4 km	MPC · JPL
200893	2002 AQ_{28}	—	January 7, 2002	Anderson Mesa	LONEOS	·	1.9 km	MPC · JPL
200894	2002 AM_{34}	—	January 10, 2002	Palomar	NEAT	·	2.0 km	MPC · JPL
200895	2002 AR_{38}	—	January 9, 2002	Socorro	LINEAR	·	1.6 km	MPC · JPL
200896	2002 AA_{41}	—	January 9, 2002	Socorro	LINEAR	·	1.7 km	MPC · JPL
200897	2002 AM_{41}	—	January 9, 2002	Socorro	LINEAR	·	1.2 km	MPC · JPL
200898	2002 AR_{41}	—	January 9, 2002	Socorro	LINEAR	·	2.6 km	MPC · JPL
200899	2002 AJ_{43}	—	January 9, 2002	Socorro	LINEAR	·	1.4 km	MPC · JPL
200900	2002 AV_{43}	—	January 9, 2002	Socorro	LINEAR	·	1.6 km	MPC · JPL

== 200901–201000 ==
back to top

Designation			Discovery			Properties		Ref
Permanent	Provisional	Named after	Date	Site	Discoverer(s)	Category	Diam.	Ref
200901	2002 AM_{44}	—	January 9, 2002	Socorro	LINEAR	·	1.1 km	MPC · JPL
200902	2002 AT_{47}	—	January 9, 2002	Socorro	LINEAR	3:2 · SHU	5.8 km	MPC · JPL
200903	2002 AW_{47}	—	January 9, 2002	Socorro	LINEAR	NYS	1.4 km	MPC · JPL
200904	2002 AX_{49}	—	January 9, 2002	Socorro	LINEAR	·	1.8 km	MPC · JPL
200905	2002 AG_{53}	—	January 9, 2002	Socorro	LINEAR	·	1.2 km	MPC · JPL
200906	2002 AJ_{53}	—	January 9, 2002	Socorro	LINEAR	NYS	1.6 km	MPC · JPL
200907	2002 AR_{53}	—	January 9, 2002	Socorro	LINEAR	·	1.4 km	MPC · JPL
200908	2002 AZ_{67}	—	January 9, 2002	Kitt Peak	Spacewatch	MAS	1.1 km	MPC · JPL
200909	2002 AM_{70}	—	January 8, 2002	Socorro	LINEAR	·	1.8 km	MPC · JPL
200910	2002 AF_{72}	—	January 8, 2002	Socorro	LINEAR	·	1.3 km	MPC · JPL
200911	2002 AP_{78}	—	January 8, 2002	Socorro	LINEAR	V	1.2 km	MPC · JPL
200912	2002 AY_{88}	—	January 9, 2002	Socorro	LINEAR	·	1.4 km	MPC · JPL
200913	2002 AN_{93}	—	January 8, 2002	Socorro	LINEAR	·	1.1 km	MPC · JPL
200914	2002 AL_{96}	—	January 8, 2002	Socorro	LINEAR	·	2.4 km	MPC · JPL
200915	2002 AH_{98}	—	January 8, 2002	Socorro	LINEAR	·	1.8 km	MPC · JPL
200916	2002 AH_{99}	—	January 8, 2002	Socorro	LINEAR	·	1.7 km	MPC · JPL
200917	2002 AP_{100}	—	January 8, 2002	Socorro	LINEAR	NYS	1.7 km	MPC · JPL
200918	2002 AS_{104}	—	January 9, 2002	Socorro	LINEAR	·	1.7 km	MPC · JPL
200919	2002 AU_{104}	—	January 9, 2002	Socorro	LINEAR	·	2.3 km	MPC · JPL
200920	2002 AK_{106}	—	January 9, 2002	Socorro	LINEAR	MAS	840 m	MPC · JPL
200921	2002 AC_{112}	—	January 9, 2002	Socorro	LINEAR	NYS	1.8 km	MPC · JPL
200922	2002 AK_{114}	—	January 9, 2002	Socorro	LINEAR	·	2.3 km	MPC · JPL
200923	2002 AB_{117}	—	January 9, 2002	Socorro	LINEAR	·	1.9 km	MPC · JPL
200924	2002 AP_{119}	—	January 9, 2002	Socorro	LINEAR	MAS	980 m	MPC · JPL
200925	2002 AP_{121}	—	January 9, 2002	Socorro	LINEAR	·	2.1 km	MPC · JPL
200926	2002 AS_{132}	—	January 8, 2002	Socorro	LINEAR	·	1.0 km	MPC · JPL
200927	2002 AA_{134}	—	January 9, 2002	Socorro	LINEAR	ERI	1.7 km	MPC · JPL
200928	2002 AY_{151}	—	January 14, 2002	Socorro	LINEAR	·	2.6 km	MPC · JPL
200929	2002 AT_{159}	—	January 13, 2002	Socorro	LINEAR	NYS	1.5 km	MPC · JPL
200930	2002 AG_{160}	—	January 13, 2002	Socorro	LINEAR	·	1.6 km	MPC · JPL
200931	2002 AN_{161}	—	January 13, 2002	Socorro	LINEAR	NYS	1.7 km	MPC · JPL
200932	2002 AA_{162}	—	January 13, 2002	Socorro	LINEAR	·	1.8 km	MPC · JPL
200933	2002 AU_{163}	—	January 13, 2002	Socorro	LINEAR	NYS	1.7 km	MPC · JPL
200934	2002 AL_{164}	—	January 13, 2002	Socorro	LINEAR	·	2.9 km	MPC · JPL
200935	2002 AO_{164}	—	January 13, 2002	Socorro	LINEAR	·	1.4 km	MPC · JPL
200936	2002 AC_{168}	—	January 14, 2002	Socorro	LINEAR	MAS	1.0 km	MPC · JPL
200937	2002 AM_{168}	—	January 14, 2002	Socorro	LINEAR	·	1.7 km	MPC · JPL
200938	2002 AN_{172}	—	January 14, 2002	Socorro	LINEAR	·	1.4 km	MPC · JPL
200939	2002 AF_{173}	—	January 14, 2002	Socorro	LINEAR	·	1.7 km	MPC · JPL
200940	2002 AB_{175}	—	January 14, 2002	Socorro	LINEAR	MAS	810 m	MPC · JPL
200941	2002 AP_{176}	—	January 14, 2002	Socorro	LINEAR	NYS	1.4 km	MPC · JPL
200942	2002 AQ_{176}	—	January 14, 2002	Socorro	LINEAR	·	2.0 km	MPC · JPL
200943	2002 AK_{194}	—	January 12, 2002	Kitt Peak	Spacewatch	·	1.0 km	MPC · JPL
200944	2002 AV_{199}	—	January 8, 2002	Socorro	LINEAR	·	1.2 km	MPC · JPL
200945	2002 AJ_{203}	—	January 7, 2002	Kitt Peak	Spacewatch	MAS	690 m	MPC · JPL
200946	2002 BF_{10}	—	January 18, 2002	Socorro	LINEAR	·	1.7 km	MPC · JPL
200947	2002 BK_{12}	—	January 20, 2002	Kitt Peak	Spacewatch	·	1.4 km	MPC · JPL
200948	2002 BE_{13}	—	January 18, 2002	Socorro	LINEAR	·	4.0 km	MPC · JPL
200949	2002 BR_{13}	—	January 19, 2002	Socorro	LINEAR	·	2.3 km	MPC · JPL
200950	2002 BW_{14}	—	January 19, 2002	Socorro	LINEAR	·	1.1 km	MPC · JPL
200951	2002 BN_{15}	—	January 19, 2002	Socorro	LINEAR	·	2.1 km	MPC · JPL
200952	2002 BR_{18}	—	January 21, 2002	Socorro	LINEAR	·	1.3 km	MPC · JPL
200953	2002 BJ_{20}	—	January 21, 2002	Socorro	LINEAR	V	1.1 km	MPC · JPL
200954	2002 BB_{22}	—	January 21, 2002	Socorro	LINEAR	·	1.9 km	MPC · JPL
200955	2002 BT_{26}	—	January 17, 2002	Palomar	NEAT	V	1.0 km	MPC · JPL
200956	2002 BH_{28}	—	January 21, 2002	Socorro	LINEAR	·	1.3 km	MPC · JPL
200957	2002 CF_{11}	—	February 6, 2002	Desert Eagle	W. K. Y. Yeung	·	1.7 km	MPC · JPL
200958	2002 CX_{13}	—	February 8, 2002	Desert Eagle	W. K. Y. Yeung	·	4.6 km	MPC · JPL
200959	2002 CQ_{19}	—	February 4, 2002	Palomar	NEAT	·	1.9 km	MPC · JPL
200960	2002 CR_{27}	—	February 6, 2002	Socorro	LINEAR	·	1.8 km	MPC · JPL
200961	2002 CB_{28}	—	February 6, 2002	Socorro	LINEAR	V	1.2 km	MPC · JPL
200962	2002 CE_{29}	—	February 6, 2002	Socorro	LINEAR	·	1.7 km	MPC · JPL
200963	2002 CW_{33}	—	February 6, 2002	Socorro	LINEAR	KON	3.9 km	MPC · JPL
200964	2002 CM_{36}	—	February 7, 2002	Socorro	LINEAR	·	1.5 km	MPC · JPL
200965	2002 CA_{49}	—	February 3, 2002	Haleakala	NEAT	MAS	1.1 km	MPC · JPL
200966	2002 CP_{63}	—	February 6, 2002	Socorro	LINEAR	·	2.1 km	MPC · JPL
200967	2002 CE_{67}	—	February 7, 2002	Socorro	LINEAR	NYS	1.6 km	MPC · JPL
200968	2002 CT_{68}	—	February 7, 2002	Socorro	LINEAR	·	1.2 km	MPC · JPL
200969	2002 CN_{74}	—	February 7, 2002	Socorro	LINEAR	·	1.7 km	MPC · JPL
200970	2002 CP_{90}	—	February 7, 2002	Socorro	LINEAR	·	1.2 km	MPC · JPL
200971	2002 CD_{94}	—	February 7, 2002	Socorro	LINEAR	NYS ·	2.9 km	MPC · JPL
200972	2002 CT_{94}	—	February 7, 2002	Socorro	LINEAR	·	2.1 km	MPC · JPL
200973	2002 CM_{95}	—	February 7, 2002	Socorro	LINEAR	·	1.7 km	MPC · JPL
200974	2002 CH_{98}	—	February 7, 2002	Socorro	LINEAR	NYS	2.0 km	MPC · JPL
200975	2002 CY_{110}	—	February 7, 2002	Socorro	LINEAR	·	2.0 km	MPC · JPL
200976	2002 CD_{114}	—	February 8, 2002	Socorro	LINEAR	NYS	2.0 km	MPC · JPL
200977	2002 CV_{115}	—	February 13, 2002	Socorro	LINEAR	H	870 m	MPC · JPL
200978	2002 CA_{119}	—	February 7, 2002	Socorro	LINEAR	·	1.5 km	MPC · JPL
200979	2002 CD_{120}	—	February 7, 2002	Socorro	LINEAR	·	1.0 km	MPC · JPL
200980	2002 CJ_{120}	—	February 7, 2002	Socorro	LINEAR	·	1.8 km	MPC · JPL
200981	2002 CZ_{121}	—	February 7, 2002	Socorro	LINEAR	·	1.2 km	MPC · JPL
200982	2002 CQ_{122}	—	February 7, 2002	Socorro	LINEAR	MAS	830 m	MPC · JPL
200983	2002 CS_{125}	—	February 7, 2002	Socorro	LINEAR	NYS	1.7 km	MPC · JPL
200984	2002 CX_{125}	—	February 7, 2002	Socorro	LINEAR	NYS	1.4 km	MPC · JPL
200985	2002 CH_{130}	—	February 7, 2002	Socorro	LINEAR	·	1.6 km	MPC · JPL
200986	2002 CF_{133}	—	February 7, 2002	Socorro	LINEAR	NYS	1.6 km	MPC · JPL
200987	2002 CQ_{133}	—	February 7, 2002	Socorro	LINEAR	NYS	1.6 km	MPC · JPL
200988	2002 CC_{136}	—	February 8, 2002	Socorro	LINEAR	·	1.5 km	MPC · JPL
200989	2002 CV_{137}	—	February 8, 2002	Socorro	LINEAR	·	1.9 km	MPC · JPL
200990	2002 CD_{140}	—	February 8, 2002	Socorro	LINEAR	·	1.4 km	MPC · JPL
200991	2002 CQ_{144}	—	February 9, 2002	Socorro	LINEAR	NYS	1.5 km	MPC · JPL
200992	2002 CU_{144}	—	February 9, 2002	Socorro	LINEAR	NYS	1.7 km	MPC · JPL
200993	2002 CE_{145}	—	February 9, 2002	Socorro	LINEAR	·	3.1 km	MPC · JPL
200994	2002 CZ_{151}	—	February 10, 2002	Socorro	LINEAR	MAS	970 m	MPC · JPL
200995	2002 CH_{155}	—	February 6, 2002	Socorro	LINEAR	·	3.0 km	MPC · JPL
200996	2002 CN_{155}	—	February 6, 2002	Socorro	LINEAR	NYS	1.5 km	MPC · JPL
200997	2002 CC_{157}	—	February 7, 2002	Socorro	LINEAR	·	1.3 km	MPC · JPL
200998	2002 CF_{159}	—	February 7, 2002	Socorro	LINEAR	MAS	840 m	MPC · JPL
200999	2002 CB_{160}	—	February 8, 2002	Socorro	LINEAR	·	3.8 km	MPC · JPL
201000	2002 CA_{165}	—	February 8, 2002	Socorro	LINEAR	·	2.1 km	MPC · JPL

back to top

== See also ==
- Meanings of minor-planet names: 200001–201000
