= List of popes of the Coptic Orthodox Church =

The following is a list of all of the Coptic Orthodox popes who have led the Coptic Orthodox Church and have succeeded the Apostle Mark the Evangelist in the office of Bishop of Alexandria, who founded the Church in the 1st century, and marked the beginning of Christianity in Africa.

The Coptic Orthodox Church is one of the Oriental Orthodox Churches (not to be confused with the Byzantine Orthodox group of churches) and is presided over by the Pope and Patriarch of Alexandria who is the body's spiritual leader. This position is held since 2012 by Pope Tawadros II, the 118th Pope of Alexandria and Patriarch of all Africa on the Holy See of St. Mark.

The Oriental Orthodox believe that they are the "one, holy, catholic, and apostolic" Church of the ancient Christian creeds. To this date 92 of the Coptic popes have been glorified, i.e., canonized as saints, in the Coptic Orthodox Church.

== Title "Pope" ==
The title "pope" (in Greek, Papás) originally was a form of address meaning 'Father' used by several bishops. The first known record of this designation was Heraclas, the 13th Archbishop of Alexandria (232–249). The Alexandrian usage of the honorific does not conflict with the usage in reference to the bishop of Rome.

The full ecclesiastical title is Papa Abba, and the person who bears it stands for the devotion of all monastics, from Pentapolis in the west to Constantinople in the east, to his guidance. Within the denomination, it is the most powerful designation, for all monks in the East to voluntarily follow his spiritual authority, and it is said that it should be assumed that he is a bearer of Christ.

For the Patriarchs of Alexandria prior to the schism after the Council of Chalcedon, see List of patriarchs of Alexandria. For the patriarchs of the Byzantine Orthodox church after the split with the Oriental Orthodox church, see List of Greek Orthodox patriarchs of Alexandria.

Not all of the dates given are certain. The dates below are according to the Gregorian calendar. Some of the dates disagree with those given in Coptic publications such as The English Katameros. In some cases, publication errors caused the difference and have been corrected. In other cases, calendar differences between the Julian and the Gregorian calendars have caused some confusion.

Dioscorus I served as Patriarch of Alexandria since 444 until he was deposed and exiled by the Council of Chalcedon in 451, but he was still recognized as the Coptic Pope until his death in 454.

== Chronological list of popes and patriarchs ==
=== 1st millennium ===
==== 1st century ====
No.	Apostolic Throne	Portrait	Popes and Patriarchs of Alexandria English • Coptic • Arabic	Name before Patriarchate	Place of Birth	Notes
1	30 or 33 AD. (Apostle of Christ); 60 or 61 AD. (Evangelist of Egypt); 8 May 68 (Martyr)		St. Mark the Apostle, Evangelist and Martyr; Marcos • Ⲙⲁⲣⲕⲟⲥ • مرقس	Yohanan (Hebrew); Marcos (Greek)	Cyrene, Pentapolis (North Africa)	One of the Seventy Apostles and traditionally viewed as the author of the Gospel of Mark. The Evangelist of the Land of Egypt. He was martyred at Baucalis (east of Alexandria) during the persecution of Christians led by the Roman Emperor Nero.
2	62 – 29 November 83 (21 years)		St. Anianus; Anianos • Ⲁⲛⲓⲁⲛⲟⲥ • إنيانوس	Anianos	Alexandria, Egypt	St. Anianus turned his house into a church, and it is said that it is the one known as the church of St. Mark which stands today in Alexandria.
3	13 December 83 – 11 September 95 (11 years, 9 months)		St. Avilius; Milieos • Ⲙⲓⲗⲓⲟⲥ • ميليوس	Milieos	Alexandria, Egypt	He was elected Pope of Alexandria during the reign of the Roman Emperor Domitian.
4	18 September 95 – 8 June 106 (10 years, 9 months, 10 days)		St. Kedron; Kerdonou • Ⲕⲉⲣⲇⲱⲛⲟⲩ • كردونوس	Kerdonou	Alexandria, Egypt	He was martyred during the persecution of Christians by the Roman Emperor Trajan.

==== 2nd century ====
No.	Apostolic Throne	Portrait	Popes and Patriarchs of Alexandria English • Coptic • Arabic	Name before Patriarchate	Place of Birth	Notes
5	29 June 106 – 9 August 118 (13 years, 1 month, 12 days)		St. Primus; Epriemou • Ⲡⲣⲓⲙⲟⲩ • إبريموس	Epriemou	Alexandria, Egypt	He was one of the three who were ordained priest by St. Mark the Apostle.
6	23 September 118 – 19 June 129 (10 years, 10 months)		St. Justus; Iostos • Ⲓⲟⲥⲧⲟⲥ • يسطس	Iostos	Alexandria, Egypt	He was the first Dean of the Catechetical School of Alexandria appointed by St. Mark the Apostle. He was elected Pope of Alexandria during the persecution against Christians by the Roman Emperor Hadrian.
7	18 July 129 – 19 October 141 (12 years, 3 months)		St. Eumenius; Oumenios • Ⲉⲩⲙⲉⲛⲓⲟⲥ • أومانيوس	Oumenios	Alexandria, Egypt	Second Dean of the Catechetical School of Alexandria. He was elected Pope of Alexandria during the persecution against Christians by the Roman Emperor Hadrian.
8	17 November 141 – 14 January 152 (10 years, 2 months)		St. Markianos; Markianos • Ⲙⲁⲣⲕⲓⲁⲛⲟⲥ • مرقيانوس	Markianos	Alexandria, Egypt	Third Dean of the Catechetical School of Alexandria. During his Patriarchy, the Christians were persecuted by the Roman Emperor Antoninus Pius.
9	29 January 152 – 16 July 166 (14 years, 6 months)		St. Celadion; Kalavtianos • Ⲕⲁⲗⲗⲁⲩⲑⲓⲁⲛⲟⲥ • كلادنيوس	Kalavtianos	Alexandria, Egypt	He was elected Pope of Alexandria during the persecution against Christians by the Roman Emperor Antoninus Pius.
10	1 August 166 – 12 February 178 (11 years, 6 months, 5 days)		St. Agrippinus; Aghreppinios • Ⲁⲅⲣⲓⲡⲡⲓⲛⲟⲥ • آغربينوس	Aghreppinios	Alexandria, Egypt	He was elected Pope of Alexandria during the persecution against Christians by the Roman Emperor Marcus Aurelius.
11	18 March 178 – 17 March 188 (10 years)		St. Julian; Yulianos • Ⲓⲟⲩⲗⲓⲁⲛⲟⲥ • يوليانوس	Yulianos	Alexandria, Egypt	He was elected Pope of Alexandria during the persecution against Christians by the Roman Emperor Marcus Aurelius.
12	17 March 188 – 22 October 230 (42 years, 7 months, 5 days).		St. Demetrius the Vinedresser; Demetrios • Ⲇⲏⲙⲏⲧⲣⲓⲟⲥ • ديمتريوس	Demetrios	Alexandria, Egypt	During his Patriarchy, the Christians were persecuted by the Roman Emperor Septimius Severus.

==== 3rd century ====
No.	Apostolic Throne	Portrait	Popes and Patriarchs of Alexandria English • Coptic • Arabic	Name before Patriarchate	Place of Birth	Notes
13	18 November 230 – 17 December 246 (16 years, 1 month)		St. Heraclas; Yaraklas • Ⲓⲉⲣⲁⲕⲗⲁⲥ • ياراكلاس	Yaraklas	Alexandria, Egypt	He is the first Patriarch to carry the hierarchy title "Pope". Which the Bishop of Rome did not use until the sixth century. During his Patriarchy, the Christians were persecuted by the Roman Emperor Maximinus the Thracian.
14	28 December 246 – 22 March 264 (17 years, 2 months, 10 days)		St. Dionysius the Great; Dionysios • Ⲇⲓⲟⲛⲩⲥⲓⲟⲥ • ديونيسيوس	Dionysios	Alexandria, Egypt	He was the Dean of the Catechetical School of Alexandria. He was elected Pope of Alexandria during the great persecution against Christians by the Roman Emperor Decius.
15	9 November 264 – 22 April 282 (17 years, 5 months)		St. Maximus; Maximos • Ⲙⲁⲝⲓⲙⲟⲥ • مكسيموس	Maximos	Alexandria, Egypt	He participated in the Synods of Antioch against the heresies of Paul of Samosata. During his Patriarchy, the Christians were persecuted by the Roman Emperor Aurelian.
16	11 December 282 – 10 January 301 (19 years, 1 month)		St. Theonas; Theonás • Ⲑⲉⲱⲛⲁⲥ • ثاؤنا	Theonás	Alexandria, Egypt	Eusebius the Historian calls him a "pillar of the Church".

==== 4th century ====
No.	Apostolic Throne	Portrait	Popes and Patriarchs of Alexandria English • Coptic • Arabic	Name before Patriarchate	Place of Birth	Notes
17	8 February 302 – 8 December 311 (9 years, 10 months)		St. Peter the Seal of the Martyrs; Petros • Ⲡⲉⲧⲣⲟⲥ • بطرس	Petros	Alexandria, Egypt	He was the last martyred during The Great Persecution led by the Roman Emperors Diocletian and Galerius.
18	24 December 311 – 26 June 312 (6 months)		St. Achillas the Great; Achıllás • Ⲁⲭⲓⲗⲗⲁⲥ • أرشيلاوس	Achıllás	Alexandria, Egypt	He was the Dean of the Catechetical School of Alexandria, defending the teachings of Orthodoxy. And was elected Pope of Alexandria during the reign of the Emperor Constantine the Great.
19	10 July 312 – 30 April 328 (15 years, 9 months, 20 days)		St. Alexander I Alexandros • Ⲁⲗⲉⲝⲁⲛⲇⲣⲟⲥ • آلِكسندر	Alexandros	Alexandria, Egypt	On 18 November 325 AD, St. Alexandros, 19th Pope & Patriarch of Alexandria attended the 1st Ecumenical Council at Nicaea, and was accompanied by his Archdeacon, St. Athanasius the Apostolic.
20	5 May 328 – 15 May 373 (45 years)		St. Athanasius the Apostolic; Athanasios • Ⲁⲑⲁⲛⲁⲥⲓⲟⲥ • أثناسيوس	Athanasios	Alexandria, Egypt	One of the Church Fathers. Attended the 1st Ecumenical Council at Nicaea as a Deacon and wrote the Nicene Creed also known as the Orthodox Creed or Athanasius Creed.
21	27 May 373 – 27 February 379 (5 years, 9 months)		St. Peter II; Petros • Ⲡⲉⲧⲣⲟⲥ • بطرس	Petros	Alexandria, Egypt	
22	14 March 379 – 2 August 385 (6 years, 4 months, 6 days)		St. Timothy I Timotheos • Ⲧⲓⲙⲟⲑⲉⲟⲥ • تيموثاوس	Timotheos	Alexandria, Egypt	Attended the 2nd Ecumenical Council at Constantinople.
23	28 August 385 – 28 October 412 (27 years, 2 months)		St. Theophilus I Theophilos • Ⲑⲉⲟ́ⲫⲓⲗⲟⲥ • ثاوفيلس	Theophilos	Alexandria, Egypt	St. Theophilus fought against the pagans, the Arians and the Anthropomorphists, supported by Emperor Theodosius. St. Theophilus was succeeded on the Apostolic Throne by his nephew St. Cyril, 24th Pope of Alexandria.

==== 5th century ====
No.	Apostolic Throne	Portrait	Popes and Patriarchs of Alexandria English • Coptic • Arabic	Name before Patriarchate	Place of Birth	Notes
24	17 October 412 – 10 July 444 (31 years, 8 months, 10 days)		St. Cyril the Pillar of Faith; Kyrillos • Ⲕⲩⲣⲓⲗⲗⲟⲥ • كيرلس	Kyrillos	Alexandria, Egypt	Known as the "Pillar of Faith" and "Lamp of the Orthodox Church". On 22 September 431 AD, St. Cyril attended the 3rd Ecumenical Council at Ephesus, which he rebuked and excommunicated Nestorius, Patriarch of Constantinople who denied the Virgin as Theotokos ('God-bearer').
25	8 August 444 – 17 September 454 (10 years, 1 month, 9 days)		St. Dioscorus the Champion of Orthodoxy; Dioscoros • Ⲇⲓⲟⲥⲕⲟⲣⲟⲥ • ديسقورس	Dioscoros	Alexandria, Egypt	Known as the "Champion of Orthodoxy". Last Pope & Patriarch of Alexandria to attend a Western council, the 4th Ecumenical Council at Chalcedon and was accompanied by St. Marcarius, Bishop of Edkow. They were exiled by Emperor Marcianus and the Empress Pulcheria to the Island of Gangra, where St. Dioscorus departed and was laid to rest.
26	13 October 455 – 13 August 477 (21 years, 10 months)		St. Timothy II; Timotheos • Ⲧⲓⲙⲟⲑⲉⲟⲥ • تيموثاوس	Timotheos	Alexandria, Egypt	
27	14 September 477 – 11 November 489 (13 years, 1 month, 29 days)		St. Peter III; Petros • Ⲡⲉⲧⲣⲟⲥ • بطرس	Petros	Alexandria, Egypt	
28	11 December 489 – 30 September 496 (6 years, 9 months, 20 days)		St. Athanasius II; Athanasios • Ⲁⲑⲁⲛⲁⲥⲓⲟⲥ • أثناسيوس	Athanasios	Alexandria, Egypt	
29	29 September 496 – 12 May 505 (8 years, 7 months)		St. John I Yoannis • Ⲓⲱⲁⲛⲛⲏⲥ • يوأنس	Yoannis	Alexandria, Egypt	

==== 6th century ====
No.	Apostolic Throne	Portrait	Popes and Patriarchs of Alexandria English • Coptic • Arabic	Name before Patriarchate	Place of Birth	Notes
30	29 May 505 – 4 June 516 (10 years, 11 months, 23 days)		St. John II; Yoannis • Ⲓⲱⲁⲛⲛⲏⲥ • يوأنس	Yoannis	Alexandria, Egypt	
31	10 June 516 – 27 October 518 (2 years, 4 months, 15 days)		St. Dioscorus II; Dioscoros • Ⲇⲓⲟⲥⲕⲟⲣⲟⲥ • ديسقورس	Dioscoros	Alexandria, Egypt	
32	10 November 518 – 20 February 536 (17 years, 3 months)		St. Timothy III; Timotheos • Ⲧⲓⲙⲟⲑⲉⲟⲥ • تيموثاوس	Timotheos	Alexandria, Egypt	
33	22 February 536 – 5 July 567 (31 years, 4 months, 15 days)		St. Theodosius I Theodosios • Ⲑⲉⲟ́ⲇⲟⲥⲓⲟⲥ • ثيئودوسيوس	Theodosios	Alexandria, Egypt	
34	25 July 567 – 2 July 569 (1 year, 10 months, 25 days)		St. Peter IV; Petros • Ⲡⲉⲧⲣⲟⲥ • بطرس	Petros	Alexandria, Egypt	
35	26 June 569 – 25 June 605 (35 years, 11 months, 16 days)		St. Damian; Damianos • Ⲇⲁⲙⲓⲁⲛⲟⲥ • داميانوس	Damianos	Syria	

==== 7th century ====
No.	Apostolic Throne	Portrait	Popes and Patriarchs of Alexandria English • Coptic • Arabic	Name before Patriarchate	Place of Birth	Notes
36	9 July 605 – 31 December 616 (11 years, 6 months)		St. Anastasius; Anastasios • Ⲁⲛⲁⲥⲧⲁⲥⲓⲟⲥ • انسطاسيوس	Anastasios	Alexandria, Egypt	
37	2 January 617 – 16 January 623 (6 years, 14 months)		St. Andronicus; Andronikos • Ⲁⲛⲇⲣⲟⲛⲓⲕⲟⲥ • أندرونيقوس	Andronikos	Alexandria, Egypt	
38	17 September 623 – 16 January 662 (39 years)		St. Benjamin I Binyamin • Ⲃⲉⲛⲓⲁⲙⲓⲛ • بنيامين	Binyamin	Barshüt, Beheira Governorate, Egypt	During his Patriarchy in 639, an army of 4,000 Arabs led by Amr Ibn Al-Aas sent by the Caliph Umar, successor to Muhammad, invaded Egypt and defeated Byzantine Emperor Heraclius. Thus ended 200 years of Byzantine persecution of Coptic Orthodox Christians since the Council of Chalcedon.
39	22 September 662 – 26 October 680 (18 years, 9 months, 3 days)		St. Agathon; Aghathon • Ⲁⲅⲁⲑⲟⲩ • أغاثون	Agathon	Mariout, Alexandria, Egypt	
40	10 December 680 – 10 December 689 (9 years)		John III; Yoannis • Ⲓⲱⲁⲛⲛⲏⲥ • يوأنس	Hanna	Samanoud, Gharbia Governorate, Egypt	
41	16 January 690 – 18 November 692 (2 years, 10 months, 2 days)		St. Isaac; Ishaac • Ⲓⲥⲁⲁⲕ • إسحق	Ishaac	El-Borolos, Kafr El Sheikh Governorate, Egypt	
42	19 December 692 – 31 July 700 (7 years, 7 months)		St. Simeon I Simeon • Ⲥⲩⲙⲉⲱⲛ • سيماؤن	Simon	Syria	

==== 8th century ====
No.	Apostolic Throne	Portrait	Popes and Patriarchs of Alexandria English • Coptic • Arabic	Name before Patriarchate	Place of Birth	Notes
43	8 May 704 – 14 February 729 (25 years, 9 months, 7 days)		St. Alexander II; Alexanderos • Ⲁⲗⲉⲝⲁⲛⲇⲣⲟⲥ • آلِكسندر	Alexanderos	Banna Abu Sir, Gharbia Governorate, Egypt	The Umayyad Caliph Al-Walid I did not limit himself to taxing the Copts' finances; he also taxed their patience. He publicly reviled Jesus and once, during a procession, he even spat in the face of an image of the Virgin Mary. When the Copts protested to the Caliph about the level of taxation he responded with more seizure of property and higher taxes. Such behavior continued under Al-Walid's successors; Yazid II not only reinstated all the earlier taxes, he also ordered the destruction of all crosses and sacred images in churches. He also ordered all his subjects to wear a leaden identification badge around their necks, and required that all Copts who wished to engage in business activity have the mark of a lion branded on their hands. Anyone caught without the mark would have his hand cut off.
44	26 March 729 – 10 June 730 (1 year, 3 months)		St. Cosmas I Kosma • Ⲕⲟⲥⲙⲁ • قسما	Kosma	Banna Abu Sir, Gharbia Governorate, Egypt	
45	8 July 730 – 14 February 742 (11 years, 7 months, 7 days)		St. Theodore I Tawadros • Ⲑⲉⲟ́ⲇⲱⲣⲟⲥ • ثاؤدروس	Tadros	Egypt	
46	14 September 743 – 25 March 767 (23 years, 6 months)		St. Michael I Khail • Ⲭⲁⲏⲗ • خائيل	Khail	Egypt	He was thrown into prison by Abd al-Malik ibn Marwan ibn Musa bin Nusayr. Hence, King Kyriakos of Makuria marched north into Egypt at the head of an army said to number 100,000 men to free the Pope. However, once the Makurian army reached Egypt, the Pope was released from prison.
47	9 April 767 – 7 February 776 (8 years, 10 months)		Mina I Mina • Ⲙнⲛⲁ • مينا	Mena	Samanoud, Gharbia Governorate, Egypt	
48	24 January 777 – 24 January 799 (22 years)		St. John IV; Yoannis • Ⲓⲱⲁⲛⲛⲏⲥ • يوأنس	Yoannis	Banna Abu Sir, Gharbia Governorate, Egypt	
49	26 January 799 – 30 April 819 (20 years, 2 months, 21 days)		St. Mark II; Marcos • Ⲙⲁⲣⲕⲟⲥ • مرقس	Marcos	Alexandria, Egypt	During his Patriarchy, the Copts were persecuted by the Abbasid Sultan, Harun al-Rashid

==== 9th century ====
No.	Apostolic Throne	Portrait	Popes and Patriarchs of Alexandria English • Coptic • Arabic	Name before Patriarchate	Place of Birth	Notes
50	12 May 819 – 21 February 830 (10 years, 9 months, 9 days)		St. James; Yakobos • Ⲓⲁⲕⲱⲃⲟⲥ • يعقوب	Yakobos	Nabaroh, Dakahlia Governorate, Egypt	In 829, the Copts of the entire Nile Delta rebelled against the Muslim authorities because of excessive taxation and religious persecution. The revolt spread to Upper Egypt. This was the greatest, the most widespread and the most broad based Egyptian rebellion in the history of Egypt under Islam.
51	28 February 830 – 13 October 830 (5 months, 17 days)		St. Simeon II; Simeon • Ⲥⲩⲙⲉⲱⲛ • سيماؤن	Simon	Alexandria, Egypt	
52	30 November 831 – 2 November 849 (17 years, 11 months, 2 days)		St. Joseph; Yousab • Ⲓⲱⲥⲏⲫ • يوساب	Youssef	Menouf, Monufia Governorate, Egypt	In 831, Al-Ma'mun, Caliph of the Abbasid Caliphate asked the Pope to pacify the rebels. The Pope asked the people for calm and obedient. All heeded him except the Bashmurians in the northernmost part of the Nile Delta, who refused his advice. Al-Ma'mun finally had to bring a large army with elephants from Turkey to conquer the Bashmurians. Without the help of Upper Egypt the Bashmurians revolt ended up in defeat, a blood bath, and widespread destruction in the marshland of the lower delta. All the surviving population of that area was removed by force to Syria.
53	20 November 849 – 30 April 851 (1 year, 4 months, 28 days)		St. Michael II; Khail • Ⲭⲁⲏⲗ • خائيل		Egypt	
54	21 July 851 – 30 November 858 (7 years, 4 months, 9 days)		St. Cosmas II; Kosma • Ⲕⲟⲥⲙⲁ • قسما		Samanoud, Gharbia Governorate, Egypt	
55	8 January 859 – 2 May 880 (21 years, 3 months, 11 days)		St. Shenouda I Shenoute • Ϣⲉⲛⲟⲩϯ • سانوتيوس	Shenouda	Samanoud, Gharbia Governorate, Egypt	
56	25 April 880 – 29 March 907 (27 years, 1 month, 9 days)		St. Michael III; Khail • Ⲭⲁⲏⲗ • خائيل	Khail	Egypt	In 882, the governor of Egypt, Ahmad ibn Tulun, forced the Pope to pay heavy contributions, forcing him to sell a church and some attached properties to the local Jewish community. This building was at one time believed to have later become the site of the Cairo Geniza.

==== 10th century ====
No.	Apostolic Throne	Portrait	Popes and Patriarchs of Alexandria English • Coptic • Arabic	Name before Patriarchate	Place of Birth	Notes
57	29 May 909 – 28 February 920 (10 years, 9 months)		St. Gabriel I Gabriel • Ⲅⲁⲃⲣⲓⲏⲗ • غبريال	Gabriel	Shibin El Kom, Monufia Governorate, Egypt	
58	28 February 920 – 12 March 932 (12 years)		St. Cosmas III; Kosma • Ⲕⲟⲥⲙⲁ • قسما	Kosma	Egypt	
59	9 April 932 – 2 April 952 (19 years, 11 months, 23 days)		St. Macarius I Macarius • Ⲙⲁⲕⲁⲣⲓⲟⲥ • مكاريوس		Alexandria, Egypt	
60	1 August 952 – 19 December 956 (4 years, 4 months, 11 days)		St. Theophilus II; Theophilos • Ⲑⲉⲟ́ⲫⲁnⲓⲟⲥ • ثاؤفانيوس	Theophilos	Alexandria, Egypt	
61	20 December 956 – 25 November 974 (17 years, 11 months, 6 days)		Mina II; Mina • Ⲙнnⲁ • مينا	Mena	Sandela, Kafr El Sheikh Governorate, Egypt	
62	28 November 975 – 16 December 978 (3 years, 11 months)		St. Abraham; Avraam • Ⲁⲃⲣⲁⲁⲙ • أبرآم بن زرعة	Abraam ibn Zeraa	Syria	Al-Mu'iz, Caliph of the Fatimid Caliphate challenged Pope Abraham "if you have faith as a mustard seed, you will say to this mountain, ‘Move from here to there,’ and it will move" (Matt 17:20 & Mark 11:23). After 3 days of prayers and fasting the Pope with St. Simon the Tanner moved the Mokattam Mountain east of Cairo. The story of this miracle can be found in the History of the Patriarchs of Alexandria written by the historian Severus Ibn al-Muqaffa.
63	10 April 979 –21 November 1003 (24 years, 7 months, 10 days)		Pope Philotheos; Philotheos • Ⲫⲓⲗⲟⲑⲉⲟⲥ • فيلوثاوس	Philotheos	Egypt	

=== 2nd millennium ===
==== 11th century ====
No.	Apostolic Throne	Portrait	Popes and Patriarchs of Alexandria English • Coptic • Arabic	Name before Patriarchate	Place of Birth	Notes
64	28 September 1004 – 22 November 1032 (27 years, 11 months, 12 days)		St. Zacharias; Zacharias • Ⲍⲁⲭⲁⲣⲓⲁⲥ • زخارياس	Zacharias	Alexandria, Egypt	During his Patriarchy, the Copts were persecuted for nine years by the Caliph Al-Hakim. More than 30,000 churches were demolished, including the burning of the Church of the Holy Sepulchre in Jerusalem. Al-Hakim had seized the Pope, smeared his clothes with the blood of a slaughtered sheep and cast him to hungry lions, but they did not harm him. The Caliph marvelled and ordered that the Pope be allowed to rebuild churches and restore those that were destroyed.
65	13 December 1032 – 29 October 1046 (14 years, 7 months, 11 days)		Shenouda II; Shenoute • Ϣⲉⲛⲟⲩϯ • شنودة	Shenouda	Minya El Qamh, Sharqia Governorate, Egypt	
66	24 December 1046 – 23 December 1077 (31 years)		St. Christodoulos; Khristodoulos • Ⲭⲣⲓⲥⲧⲟⲇⲟⲗⲟⲥ • خرستوذولس	Khristodoulos	Manzala, Port Said Governorate, Egypt	In the year 1047 the Seat of the Coptic Orthodox Pope of Alexandria was moved from Alexandria to Cairo.
67	18 March 1078 – 19 June 1092 (14 years, 2 months, 20 days)		St. Cyril II; Kyrillos • Ⲕⲩⲣⲓⲗⲗⲟⲩ • كيرلس	Guirguis	Egypt	
68	9 October 1092 – 7 June 1102 (9 years, 7 months, 17 days)		St. Michael IV; Mikhail • Ⲙⲓχⲁⲏⲗ • ميخائيل	Mikhail	Sakha, Kafr El Sheikh Governorate, Egypt	

==== 12th century ====
No.	Apostolic Throne	Portrait	Popes and Patriarchs of Alexandria English • Coptic • Arabic	Name before Patriarchate	Place of Birth	Notes
69	22 November 1102 – 14 September 1128 (26 years, 1 month, 11 days)		St. Macarius II; Macarios • Ⲙⲁⲕⲁⲣⲓⲟⲥ • مكاريوس		Egypt	
70	3 February 1131 – 18 April 1145 (14 years, 2 months, 2 days)		St. Gabriel II; Gabriel • Ⲅⲁⲃⲣⲓⲏⲗ • غبريال	Ela ibn Turaik	Fustat, Egypt	
71	29 July 1145 – 11 April 1146 (8 months)		St. Michael V Mikhail • Ⲙⲓχⲁⲏⲗ • ميخائيل	Mikhail	Daqadus, Dakahlia Governorate, Egypt	
72	25 August 1147 – 12 May 1166 (18 years, 8 months, 4 days)		St. John V Yoannis • Ⲓⲱⲁⲛⲛⲏⲥ • يوأنس	Yoannis	Egypt	Crusaders invaded Egypt (1163–1169) and indiscriminately persecuted Coptic Orthodox Christians.
73	25 June 1166 –14 January 1189 (22 years, 6 months, 19 days)		Mark III; Marcos • Ⲙⲁⲣⲕⲟⲥ • مرقس	Farag ibn Abu al-Saad ibn Zarah	Alexandria, Egypt	
74	21 February 1189 – 22 January 1216 (26 years, 11 months, 8 days)		John VI; Yoannis • Ⲓⲱⲁⲛⲛⲏⲥ • يوأنس	Yoannis	Egypt	After his departure, the Apostolic Throne remained vacant for nineteen years. This is the longest vacancy in the history of the Coptic Orthodox Church.

==== 13th century ====
No.	Apostolic Throne	Portrait	Popes and Patriarchs of Alexandria English • Coptic • Arabic	Name before Patriarchate	Place of Birth	Notes
75	30 July 1235 – 23 March 1243 (7 years, 8 months, 23 days)		St. Cyril III; Kyrillos • Ⲕⲩⲣⲓⲗⲗⲟⲩ • كيرلس	Daoud ibn Laqlaq	Faiyum, Faiyum Governorate, Egypt	After his departure, the Apostolic Throne remained vacant for seven years and seven months because of the intense persecution which did not allow the Copts to elect a successor.
76	15 October 1250 – 10 December 1261 (11 years, 1 month, 18 days)		Athanasius III; Athanasios • Ⲁⲑⲁⲛⲁⲥⲓⲟⲩ • أثناسيوس	Bolis	Egypt	
77	3 November 1268 – 14 January 1271 (2 years, 2 months, 10 days)		St. Gabriel III; Gabriel • Ⲅⲁⲃⲣⲓⲏⲗ • غبريال	Gabriel ibn Fakhry	Egypt	With support from some of the Bishops, Pope Gabriel III replaced Pope John VII and reigned for three years until his death, when Pope John VII was reinstated. This is the only occasion in history when the Coptic Orthodox Church had two Popes at the same time.
78	14 January 1262 – 2 November 1269 15 January 1271 – 21 April 1293 (29 years, 1 month, 8 days)		St. John VII; Yoannis • Ⲓⲱⲁⲛⲛⲏⲥ • يوأنس	Youhanna ibn Said as-Sukari	Cairo, Egypt	With support from some of the bishops, Pope John VII was replaced for three years by Pope Gabriel III, who was originally one of the candidates for pope. Pope John VII was restored as pope after the death of Pope Gabriel III. This is the only occasion in history when the Coptic Orthodox Church had two popes at the same time.
79	17 July 1294 – 13 January 1300 (5 years, 5 months, 28 days)		Theodosius III; Theodosios • Ⲑⲉⲟ́ⲇⲟⲥⲓⲟⲥ • ثيئودوسيوس	Abdelmasih ibn Ruwail	Bani-Khosaim, Minya Governorate, Egypt	

==== 14th century ====
No.	Apostolic Throne	Portrait	Popes and Patriarchs of Alexandria English • Coptic • Arabic	Name before Patriarchate	Place of Birth	Notes
80	26 February 1300 – 11 June 1320 (20 years, 3 months, 15 days)		St. John VIII; Yoannis • Ⲓⲱⲁⲛⲛⲏⲥ • يوأنس	Youhanna ibn Absal Binyamin	Bani-Khosaim, Minya Governorate, Egypt	During his Patriarchy, the Copts were persecuted by the Mamluk Sultan, Al-Nasir Muhammad ibn Qalawun. The Sultan decreed that whoever kills a Christian could have his possessions.
81	11 October 1320 – 10 April 1327 (6 years, 6 months, 1 day)		St. John IX; Yoannis • Ⲓⲱⲁⲛⲛⲏⲥ • يوأنس	Yoannis	Nephia, Monufia Governorate, Egypt	On 8 May 1321, Muslims destroyed and burned over 60 Coptic churches and monasteries throughout Egypt.
82	23 May 1327 – 19 January 1339 (11 years, 7 months, 26 days)		Benjamin II; Binyamin • Ⲃⲉⲛⲓⲁⲙⲓⲛ • بنيامين	Binyamin	Dimikarat, Luxor Governorate, Egypt	
83	14 January 1340 – 21 July 1348 (8 years, 6 months, 6 days)		St. Peter V Petros • Ⲡⲉⲧⲣⲟⲥ • بطرس	Boutros Daoud	Egypt	
84	15 July 1348 – 13 February 1363 (14 years, 4 months, 26 days)		Mark IV; Marcos • Ⲙⲁⲣⲕⲟⲥ • مرقس	Farag Allah	Qalyub, Qalyubia Governorate, Egypt	
85	20 May 1363 – 26 July 1369 (6 years, 2 months, 7 days)		St. John X Yoannis • Ⲓⲱⲁⲛⲛⲏⲥ • يوأنس	Youhanna	Damascus, Syria	He was the fourth and last Syrian elected Pope of Alexandria. The other three popes elected from among the Syrians were Pope Damian the 35th, Pope Simeon the 42nd and Pope Abraam the 62nd.
86	19 January 1370 – 11 May 1378 (8 years, 3 months, 22 days)		St. Gabriel IV; Gabriel • Ⲅⲁⲃⲣⲓⲏⲗ • غبريال		Egypt	During his Patriarchy, the Coptic Orthodox Christians were indiscriminately persecuted by Crusaders.
87	7 August 1378 – 13 January 1408 (30 years, 5 months, 6 days)		St. Matthew; Matheos • Ⲙⲁⲑⲉⲟⲥ • متاؤس	Matta	Bani Ruh, Ashmunein, Minya Governorate, Egypt	Also known as El Meskin ("The Poor") for his charitable deeds to the poor. During his Patriarchy, a great number of Coptic Orthodox Christians were indiscriminately persecuted by the Crusaders.

==== 15th century ====
No.	Apostolic Throne	Portrait	Popes and Patriarchs of Alexandria English • Coptic • Arabic	Name before Patriarchate	Place of Birth	Notes
88	4 May 1409 – 16 January 1427 (17 years, 8 months, 12 days)		Gabriel V Gabriel • Ⲅⲁⲃⲣⲓⲏⲗ • غبريال		Giza, Giza Governorate, Egypt	
89	11 May 1427 – 17 May 1452 (24 years, 11 months, 23 days)		St. John XI; Yoannis • Ⲓⲱⲁⲛⲛⲏⲥ • يوأنس	Farag	El-Maksa, Cairo, Egypt	In 1441, the Ethiopian Emperor Zara Yaqob threatened the Burji Sultan Sayf al-Din Jaqmaq to cut the flow of the Nile because of the destruction of monasteries and persecution against Copts led by the Sultan Jaqmaq. However, the Emperor refrained from doing so for the human suffering it would cause. Pope John also sent a Coptic and Ethiopian delegation to the Council of Florence.
90	23 September 1452 – 23 September 1465 (13 years)		St. Matthew II; Matheos • Ⲙⲁⲑⲉⲟⲥ • متاؤس	Sulayman	Upper Egypt	
91	1466 –28 December 1475 (8 years, 10 months, 6 days)		Gabriel VI; Gabriel • Ⲅⲁⲃⲣⲓⲏⲗ • غبريال		Egypt	
92	2 March 1477 – 23 February 1478 (1 year, 3 days)		Michael VI; Mikhail • Ⲙⲓχⲁⲏⲗ • ميخائيل		Samalut, Minya Governorate, Egypt	
93	1 May 1480 – 17 September 1483 (3 years, 4 months, 17 days)		John XII; Yoannis • Ⲓⲱⲁⲛⲛⲏⲥ • يوأنس		Naqada, Qena Governorate, Egypt	
94	22 February 1484 – 18 February 1524 (39 years, 11 months, 26 days)		John XIII; Yoannis • Ⲓⲱⲁⲛⲛⲏⲥ • يوأنس		Sodfa, Asyut Governorate, Egypt	

==== 16th century ====
No.	Apostolic Throne	Portrait	Popes and Patriarchs of Alexandria English • Coptic • Arabic	Name before Patriarchate	Place of Birth	Notes
95	14 October 1525 – 17 July 1568 (43 years, 25 days)		St. Gabriel VII; Gabriel • Ⲅⲁⲃⲣⲓⲏⲗ • غبريال	Roufail	El-Qusiya, Asyut Governorate, Egypt	
96	17 April 1571 – 8 September 1586 (15 years, 4 months, 19 days)		St. John XIV; Yoannis • Ⲓⲱⲁⲛⲛⲏⲥ • يوأنس		Manfalut, Asyut Governorate, Egypt	
97	20 June 1587 – 17 May 1603 (15 years, 10 months, 24 days)		St. Gabriel VIII; Gabriel • Ⲅⲁⲃⲣⲓⲏⲗ • غبريال	Shenouda	Meir, Asyut Governorate, Egypt	

==== 17th century ====
No.	Apostolic Throne	Portrait	Popes and Patriarchs of Alexandria English • Coptic • Arabic	Name before Patriarchate	Place of Birth	Notes
98	3 July 1603 – 11 September 1619 (16 years, 2 months, 9 days)		Mark V Marcos • Ⲙⲁⲣⲕⲟⲥ • مرقس		El Bayadeya, Asyut Governorate, Egypt	Arabic becomes Egypt's official language. Islamic rulers threatened to cut the tongues of any Egyptian that was found speaking in the Coptic language. Despite the persecutions, the Coptic Popes are credited for preserving the Coptic language.
99	18 September 1619 – 10 September 1629 (9 years, 11 months, 22 days)		St. John XV; Yoannis • Ⲓⲱⲁⲛⲛⲏⲥ • يوأنس		Mallawi, Minya Governorate, Egypt	Buried at St.Anba Bishih Monastery in El-Bayadia, Egypt.
100	7 September 1631 – 3 April 1646 (14 years, 6 months, 23 days)		St. Matthew III; Matheos • Ⲙⲁⲑⲉⲟⲥ • متاؤس	Tadros	Toukh El-Nasarah, Monufia Governorate, Egypt	
101	20 April 1646 – 20 April 1656 (10 years)		St. Mark VI; Marcos • Ⲙⲁⲣⲕⲟⲥ • مرقس	Tadros	Bahgourah, Qena Governorate, Egypt	
102	6 December 1660 – 22 August 1675 (14 years, 8 months, 9 days)		St. Matthew IV; Matheos • Ⲙⲁⲑⲉⲟⲥ • متاؤس	Guirguis	Meir, Asyut Governorate, Egypt	
103	5 May 1676 – 17 June 1718 (42 years, 3 months)		St. John XVI; Yoannis • Ⲓⲱⲁⲛⲛⲏⲥ • يوأنس	Ibrahim	Toukh El-Nasarah, Monufia Governorate, Egypt	

==== 18th century ====
No.	Apostolic Throne	Portrait	Popes and Patriarchs of Alexandria English • Coptic • Arabic	Name before Patriarchate	Place of Birth	Notes
104	21 August 1718 – 4 April 1726 (7 years, 7 months, 11 days)		St. Peter VI; Petros • Ⲡⲉⲧⲣⲟⲥ • بطرس	Morgan	Asyut; Asyut Governorate, Egypt	
105	12 January 1727 – 21 April 1745 (18 years, 3 months, 8 days)		St. John XVII; Yoannis • Ⲓⲱⲁⲛⲛⲏⲥ • يوأنس	Abdelsayed	Mallawi, Minya Governorate, Egypt	
106	30 May 1745 – 18 May 1769 (23 years, 11 months, 18 days)		St. Mark VII; Marcos • Ⲙⲁⲣⲕⲟⲥ • مرقس	Simeon	Klosna, El Bahnasa, Minya Governorate, Egypt	During his Patriarchy, there was an attempt from the Catholic Church to take over the Coptic Church. They ordained a monk from Jerusalem to be a Catholic Bishop in Egypt, but he was unable to come to Egypt and stayed in Jerusalem. They also ordained Raphael Al Tokhi as their bishop for Upper Egypt, but he was unable to stay there, so the Pope of Rome called him to Rome to stay there. Pope Mark VII wrote many books about the Coptic Church.
107	23 October 1769 – 9 June 1796 (26 years, 7 months, 14 days)		St. John XVIII; Yoannis • Ⲓⲱⲁⲛⲛⲏⲥ • يوأنس	Youssef	Faiyum, Faiyum Governorate, Egypt	During his Patriarchy, Pope Pius VI of Rome sent an envoy to Pope John XVIII of Alexandria asking him to unite the Church of Alexandria with the Roman Catholic Church under the proceedings of the Council of Chalcedon. Pope John XVIII and all the Bishops in Egypt unanimously refuted the Tome of Leo and defended "One Nature-the Logos Incarnate," of the full humanity and full divinity. The famous scholar and theologian Joseph el-Abbah, Bishop of Girga responded to Pope Pius VI message and rejected the proceedings of the Council of Chalcedon in which Leo, the Archbishop of Rome preached Christ "in two natures".
108	4 October 1796 – 21 December 1809 (13 years, 2 months, 19 days)		St. Mark VIII; Marcos • Ⲙⲁⲣⲕⲟⲥ • مرقس	Youhanna	Tima, Sohag Governorate, Egypt	During his Patriarchy, the French invaded Egypt. His seat at Haret Al Rum was transferred to Saint Mark's Coptic Orthodox Cathedral, Azbakeya in the year 1800.

==== 19th century ====
No.	Apostolic Throne	Portrait	Popes and Patriarchs of Alexandria English • Coptic • Arabic	Name before Patriarchate	Place of Birth	Notes
109	24 December 1809 – 5 April 1852 (42–43 years)		St. Peter VII; Petros • Ⲡⲉⲧⲣⲟⲥ • بطرس	Mankarius	Gawli, Manfalut, Asyut Governorate, Egypt	A Russian ambassador offered the Patriarch Peter VII the protection from the Emperor of Russia, Nicholas I, however the patriarch thanked the Emperor, saying no other protection was needed than God.
110	5 June 1853 – 31 January 1862 (6 years, 7 months, 13 days)		Cyril IV; Kyrillos • Ⲕⲩⲣⲓⲗⲗⲟⲩ • كيرلس	Daoud	Sawamaa, Girga, Sohag Governorate, Egypt	He established a Coptic School in Haret El-Sakkayeen. As well as a printing house and printed many church books.
111	17 June 1862 – 18 January 1870 (7 years, 7 months, 3 days)		Demetrius II; Demetrios • Ⲇⲏⲙⲏⲧⲣⲓⲟⲥ • ديمتريوس	Mikhail	Galda, Minya Governorate, Egypt	
112	1 November 1874 – 7 August 1927 (52 years, 9 months, 6 days)		Cyril V Kyrillos • Ⲕⲩⲣⲓⲗⲗⲟⲩ • كيرلس	Youhanna	Tezment, Beni Suef Governorate, Egypt	Longest-serving pope of the Coptic Orthodox Church. In 1908, Marcus Simaika Pasha obtained the approval of the pope to build the Coptic Museum which was inaugurated on 14 March 1910.

==== 20th century ====
No.	Apostolic Throne	Portrait	Popes and Patriarchs of Alexandria English • Coptic • Arabic	Name before Patriarchate	Place of Birth	Notes
113	16 December 1928 – 21 June 1942 (13 years, 6 months, 5 days)		John XIX; Yoannis • Ⲓⲱⲁⲛⲛⲏⲥ • يوأنس		Dair Tasa, Asyut Governorate, Egypt	First ever Bishop or Metropolitan ordained Pope.
114	19 February 1944 – 31 August 1945 (1 year, 6 months, 19 days)		Macarius III; Macarius • Ⲙⲁⲕⲁⲣⲓⲟⲥ • مكاريوس		El-Mahalla El-Kubra, Gharbia Governorat, Egypt	Was ordained metropolitan for Assiut at 24 years old.
115	26 May 1946 – 14 November 1956 (10 years, 5 months, 17 days)		Joseph II; Yousab • Ⲓⲱⲥⲏⲫ • يوساب		Naghamish, Sohag Governorate, Egypt	Foundation of the Higher Institute of Coptic Studies.
116	10 May 1959 – 9 March 1971 (11 years, 9 months, 29 days)		St. Cyril VI; Kyrillos • Ⲕⲩⲣⲓⲗⲗⲟⲩ • كيرلس	Azer Youssef Atta	Damanhur, Beheira Governorate, Egypt	Pope Cyril VI (also known in Arabic as "the man of prayer") gave a humble, public image for the Coptic church. One of the more recent popes to become involved in politics, Pope Cyril VI had good relations with Egyptian President Gamal Abdel Nasser. In the tenth year of his papacy, the holy church celebrates the inauguration of the new St. Mark Cathedral in Dair El-Anba Rowais, which was known also as Dair El-Khandaq. For this occasion and for the return of the relics of St. Mark the Apostle from Rome, after being in the city of Venice in Italy for eleven centuries, a great religious celebration was organized. The celebration was headed by Pope Kyrillos the Sixth and was attended by President Gamal Abdel Naser, President of the Arab Republic of Egypt, Emperor Haile Selassie the First, Emperor of Ethiopia, and many of the heads of different religions and representatives of churches from all around the world. Among those religious leaders was Mar Ignatius Yacoub the Third, the Antiochian Patriarch for the Syrian Orthodox.
117	14 November 1971 – 17 March 2012 (40 years, 4 months, 3 days)		Shenouda III; Shenouda • Ϣⲉⲛⲟⲩϯ • شنودة	Nazeer Gayed Roufail	Abnub, Asyut Governorate, Egypt	First Pope to visit the Patriarchs of Rome and Constantinople since 451 AD. Most notably, Pope Shenouda III's reign also saw the rapid diaspora of Coptic people throughout the world for the first time in centuries (including the establishment of hundreds of churches in the United States, Australia, Canada and Switzerland.) Pope Shenouda III had the greatest impact on the Coptic Church's canon, modernizing several regulations to fit not only the needs of the Coptic people, but the traditions of the Church as well. He is formally known as "the man of ministry". From 2000 onward, violent persecution and massacres of Copts by Egyptian Muslims took place: Kosheh massacres, 2005 Alexandria riot, Nag Hammadi massacre, 2011 Alexandria bombing, 2011 Imbaba church attacks and the massacre at the 2011 Maspero demonstrations.

=== 3rd millennium ===
==== 21st century ====
No.	Apostolic Throne	Portrait	Popes and Patriarchs of Alexandria English • Coptic • Arabic	Name before Patriarchate	Place of Birth	Notes
118	18 November 2012 – Present (Since 2012)		Theodore II; Tawadros • Ⲑⲉⲟ́ⲇⲱⲣⲟⲥ • تواضروس	Wagih Subhi Baqi Sulayman	Mansoura, Dakahlia Governorate, Egypt	In August 2013, Churches and monasteries in Upper Egypt (built in the 4th and 5th centuries) were forced to cancel Sunday Mass for the first time in 1,600 years due to the intense persecution led by the Muslim Brotherhood. Persecution was also carried out by the Islamic State, including the 2015 kidnapping and beheading of Copts in Libya, 2018 Minya bus attack, Botroseya Church bombing, Palm Sunday church bombings and the attack on Saint Menas church. Construction of the Cathedral of the Nativity of Christ, Cairo, the largest active Oriental Orthodox church in the world.

== Papal names ==
The most frequently used papal name is John, with 19 popes taking this name. There have also been 25 papal names that have only been used once. The number of all popes to the present is 118.

Rank	Name	#	Popes
1	John	19	I · II · III · IV · V · VI · VII · VIII · IX · X · XI · XII · XIII · XIV · XV · XVI · XVII · XVIII · XIX
2	Gabriel	8	I · II · III · IV · V · VI · VII · VIII
2	Mark	8	I · II · III · IV · V · VI · VII · VIII
4	Peter	7	I · II · III · IV · V · VI · VII
5	Michael	6	I · II · III · IV · V · VI
5	Cyril	6	I · II · III · IV · V · VI
7	Matthew	4	I · II · III · IV
8	Athanasius	3	I · II · III
8	Cosmas	3	I · II · III
8	Macarius	3	I · II · III
8	Shenouda	3	I · II · III
8	Theodosius	3	I · II · III
8	Timothy	3	I · II · III
14	Alexander	2	I · II
14	Benjamin	2	I · II
14	Demetrius	2	I · II
14	Dioscorus	2	I · II
14	Joseph	2	I · II
14	Mina	2	I · II
14	Simeon	2	I · II
14	Theodore / Tawadros	2	I · II (Incumbent)
14	Theophilus	2	I · II
23	Abraham	1	
23	Achillas	1	
23	Agathon	1	
23	Agrippinus	1	
23	Anastasius	1	
23	Andronicus	1	
23	Anianus	1	
23	Avilius	1	
23	Celadion	1	
23	Christodoulos	1	
23	Damian	1	
23	Dionysius	1	
23	Eumenius	1	
23	Heraclas	1	
23	Isaac	1	
23	James	1	
23	Julian	1	
23	Justus	1	
23	Kedron	1	
23	Markianos	1	
23	Maximus	1	
23	Philotheos	1	
23	Primus	1	
23	Theonas	1	
23	Zacharias	1	

== See also ==
- Coptic Orthodox Church
- Coptic Orthodox bishops
- Coptic Orthodox priests
