= John of Nikiû =

Egyptian Coptic bishop (fl. 680–690)

Bishop of Nikiû (Pshiati), Nile Delta, Egypt
- In office fl. circa 680 – circa 690–700

Personal details
- Born: 7th century
- Died: Late 7th century
- Known for: Chronicle covering history from Adam to the Muslim conquest of Egypt

John of Nikiû (fl. 680–690) was an Egyptian Coptic bishop of Nikiû (Pashati) in the Nile Delta and general administrator of the monasteries of Upper Egypt in 696. He is the author of a Chronicle extending from Adam to the end of the Muslim conquest of Egypt. John of Nikiû's Chronicle contains important historical details otherwise unknown.

== Life ==
There are two main sources for John's life. The first is the History of the Patriarchs by Severus, Bishop of Al-Ashmunayn (Heliopolis). This draws on two originally independent biographies that mention John: those of Pope Isaac of Alexandria (690–692 CE) and Pope Simeon I of Alexandria (692–700 CE). The second source is the Life of Isaac of Alexandria composed by John's successor as bishop of Nikiu, Mena of Nikiu, between 697 and 700 CE.

According to the History of the Patriarchs, John lived under the Patriarchs John III, Isaac, and Simeon. The Patriarch Simeon removed John from office for having disciplined a monk (presumed guilty of leading other monks into removing a nun from her monastery's cell in Wadi Habib and sleeping with her) so severely that the monk died ten days later.

== Chronicle ==
The original editor of this text, Zotenberg, argued that John of Nikiû's Chronicle was originally written mostly in Greek, theorising that some of the name forms indicate that John wrote the sections concerning Egypt in Coptic. Scholarly opinion has shifted, however, to the belief that this chronicle was probably written in Coptic. The work survives only in a Ge'ez translation. In 1602, an Arabic translation of the original was made. Sections of the text are obviously corrupted with accidental omissions. Most notably, a passage covering thirty years (from 610 to 640) is missing. The narrative, especially the earlier sections up until the reign of Constantine, has many obvious historical errors. These may be due to mistakes by the copyist, or to a policy of deliberate negligence towards Pagan history. There are also many instances of myth and less a reliance on pure history, for instance, Julius Caesar's mother being cut open to birth him, resulting in a Caesarian section. This is a fable made up by later historians and bears no evidence to historical fact.

John's view of the earliest periods of history is informed by sources such as Sextus Julius Africanus and John Malalas. The Chronicle is most noteworthy for its passages dealing with the early 7th century. John covers in detail the revolt of the Thracian armies in 602 and the subsequent overthrow of the Emperor Maurice by the usurper Phocas. His account adds considerably to the historical understanding of the reign of Phocas and particularly to the successful revolt against him begun at Carthage by Heraclius. However, the section dealing with the climactic Persian wars waged by Heraclius is not extant.

Perhaps the most important section of John's Chronicle is that which deals with the invasion and conquest of Egypt by the Muslim armies of Amr ibn al-Aas. Though probably not an eyewitness, John was most likely of the generation immediately following the conquest, and the Chronicle provides the only near-contemporary account. John describes the major events of Amr's campaign, such as the taking of the Babylon Fortress and the capture of Alexandria. Though the timeline is occasionally confusing, its narrative details are often vivid.

In the Chronicle, John vividly records the fear that gripped Egypt during the Muslim invasions:

Then a panic fell on all the cities of Egypt, and all their inhabitants took to flight, and made their way to Alexandria, abandoning all their possessions and wealth and cattle.

He also makes several mentions of the atrocities committed against the Copts by the Arabs:

And these Ishmaelites came and slew without mercy the commander of the troops and all his companions. And forthwith they compelled the city to open its gates, and they put to the sword all that surrendered, and they spared none, whether old men, babe or woman.

Also:

And thereupon the Moslem made their entry into Nakius, and took possession, and finding no soldiers (to offer resistance), they proceeded to put to the sword all whom they found in the streets and in the churches, men, women, and infants, and they showed mercy to none.

John also reports the prohibitive new taxes placed on the native population. In some cases, the taxes were so burdensome that families were forced to sell their children into slavery. He also admonishes Egyptians who abandoned Christianity in favour of Islam. Writing from a miaphysite point of view—at odds with the dyophysite Christology affirmed at the Council of Chalcedon in 451—John describes the Islamic invasion of his homeland as divine punishment for the Chalcedonian beliefs which held sway in the Byzantine Empire. At the close of his Chronicle, John describes the despair felt by the conquered Alexandrians, writing:

None could recount the mourning and lamentation which took place in that city....And they had none to help them, and God destroyed their hopes and delivered the Christians into the hands of their enemies.

The account ends with the faith that divine retribution would still befall his people's enemies:

But the strong beneficence of God will put to shame those who grieve us, and He will make His love for man to triumph over our sins, and bring to naught the evil purposes of those who afflict us, who would not that the King of Kings and Lord of Lords should reign over them, (even) Jesus Christ our true God. As for those wicked slaves, He will destroy them in evil fashion: as saith the holy Gospel: 'As for Mine enemies who would not that I should reign over them, bring them unto Me.'

== Editions and translations ==
- Charles, Robert H. (2007) [1916]. The Chronicle of John, Bishop of Nikiu: Translated from Zotenberg's Ethiopic Text. Merchantville, NJ: Evolution Publishing. ISBN 978-1-889758-87-9.; Introduction and English translation from Tertullian.org; Introduction and English translation from earlychristianwritings.com.
- "La Chronique de Jean de Nikioû", ed. and translated into French by H. Zotenberg in Notices et Extraits des manuscrits de la Bibliothèque Nationale, t. XXIV, I, pp. 125–605 (Paris, 1883) and also separately (Paris, 1883). (Online version in Gallica website at the "Bibliothèque nationale de France")
