= Barsanuphians =

Egyptian Christian sect, 6th-9th centuries

The Barsanuphians (also Barsanuphites or Bersounouphites) were a monophysite non-Chalcedonian Christian sect in Egypt between the late 6th and early 9th century.

According to Timothy of Constantinople and the History of the Patriarchs of Alexandria, the sect took its name from a certain Barsanuphius who assumed the title of bishop. They were counted among the Akephaloi (leaderless ones) who split from the mainstream miaphysite patriarchate of Alexandria during the reign of the Emperor Zeno (474–491) on account of the Henoticon (482). They developed a distinct hierarchy, separating from the Akephaloi, during the time of the Patriarch Damian (578–607).

The Barsanuphians were limited to Alexandria and a few villages in the eastern Nile Delta. They do not seem to have had more than three bishops. Patriarch Agatho (661–677) ransomed some fugitive Barsanuphians along with members of his own flock, causing some to convert. During the reign of the Patriarch Alexander II (705–730), some Barsanuphians of al-Muna were converted back to orthodox miaphysitism by John of Sa and others by Isaac of Samannud. Around the same time, an enterprising Christian civil servant received permission from Governor Qurra ibn Sharik to charge twice the normal jizya (tax) on the Barsanuphians and other schismatics (Gaianites and Julianists). This had the intended effect of bringing many back into the patriarch's fold. Under Patriarch Michael I (744–768), Bishop John of Samannud converted many Barsanuphians to orthodoxy.

By the early 9th century the sect was based mainly in Fustat. Around 810, it was led by two bishops, George and his son Abraham. Patriarch Mark II baptized them at the monastery of Saint Mina and consecrated them as orthodox bishops (albeit without dioceses). The conversion of the rest of the movement soon followed. Mark appointed George and Abraham to the first bishoprics to become available. For George this was Tanbudha, for Abraham Atripe. The reconciliation of the Barsanuphians necessitated some bending of canon law. There is, for example, no evidence that George was widowed or separated from his wife. Mark II also rebuilt and reconsecrated one of the former churches of the Barsanuphians.

Based on a passage in Sophronius (died 638), Arieh Kofsky links them to the teachings of Barsanuphius of Gaza, rather than the otherwise unknown bishop. Kurt Schimke also treats them as followers of the Chalcedonian ascetic of Gaza and primarily a monastic movement.

== Bibliography ==
- Kofsky, Arieh (2004). "What Ever Happened to the Monophysite Monasticism of Gaza?". In Brouria Bitton Ashkelony; Arieh Kofsky (eds.). Christian Gaza In Late Antiquity. Brill. pp. 183–194.
- Mikhail, Maged S. A. (2004). Egypt from Late Antiquity to Early Islam: Copts, Melkites, and Muslims Shaping a New Society (PhD diss.). University of California Los Angeles.
- Mikhail, Maged S. A. (2014). From Byzantine to Islamic Egypt: Religion, Identity and Politics after the Arab Conquest. I. B. Tauris.
- Schimke, Kurt Gustav Peter (2019). The Character of the Purse: Analyzing Tax Records and Administrative Policy from the Perspective of Christology in 7th–8th Century Egypt (PhD diss.). Stellenbosch University.
- Stewart, Randall (1991). "Barsanuphians". In Aziz Suryal Atiya (ed.). The Coptic Encyclopedia. Vol. 2. New York: Macmillan Publishers. cols. 347b–348a.
- Strong, James; McClintock, John, eds. (1891). "Barsanuphians (or Barsanuphites)". The Cyclopaedia of Biblical, Theological and Ecclesiastical Literature. Vol. 11. New York: Haper and Brothers. p. 359.
- Swanson, Mark N. (2010). The Coptic Papacy in Islamic Egypt (641–1517). American University in Cairo Press.
