= Pope Benjamin I of Alexandria =

Head of the Coptic Church from 623 to 662

Saint Benjamin I of Alexandria
- Pope of Alexandria & Patriarch of the See of St. Mark
- Papacy began: c. 623 AD
- Papacy ended: 16 January 662 AD
- Predecessor: Andronicus
- Successor: Agathon

Personal details
- Born: c. 590 AD Barshüt, Beheira Governorate, Egypt
- Died: 16 January 662 AD Alexandria, Egypt, Umayyad Caliphate
- Buried: Saint Mark's Church
- Denomination: Coptic Orthodox Christian
- Residence: Saint Mark's Church

Sainthood
- Feast day: 16 January (8 Toba in the Coptic calendar)

Pope Benjamin I of Alexandria, was an Egyptian saint, the 38th Pope of Alexandria & Patriarch of the See of St. Mark. He is regarded as one of the greatest patriarchs of the Coptic Church. Benjamin guided the Coptic church through a period of turmoil in Egyptian history that included the fall of Egypt to the Sasanian Empire, followed by Egypt's reconquest under the Byzantines, and finally the Arab Islamic Conquest in 642. After the Arab conquest Pope Benjamin, who was in exile, was allowed to return to Alexandria and resume the patriarchate.

== Early life ==
He was born around 590 in Barshüt, in the Beheira region of the western Nile Delta area. Comparatively little is known about his early life, other than that he came from a Coptic family of comfortable means. The proximity of his home to the capital city of Alexandria has led some to assume that he received some education there.

No details on his family life are known, other than that he had one brother, Mennas. Mennas is known for having been tortured with fire and, eventually, being drowned in the Nile by the Byzantine Patriarch Cyrus of Alexandria for refusing to take the Chalcedonian profession of faith and refusing to reveal the whereabouts of Benjamin, who was himself a fugitive at that time.

== Monastic years ==
Benjamin was noted for ascetic habits from an early age, and in 620, at the age of thirty, he took monastic vows at the monastery of Canopus, Egypt, which had avoided destruction by the Persians due to its isolated location. Benjamin further developed his asceticism in the cenobitic communities which followed the rule of Pachomius. It was at Canopus that Benjamin first met an older monk named Theonas, who presented Benjamin with the schema or monastic garment. Theonas instructed Benjamin in the virtues of the monastic life, including holiness, patience, and self-control, and in the study of the Bible. Theonas himself is said to have been particularly devoted to the Gospel of John, which he went so far as to memorize.

== Alexandria ==
One night he heard in a vision someone saying to him, "Rejoice Benjamin, you will shepherd the flock of Christ." When he told that to his spiritual father, he said to him, "The devil wants to hinder you. Beware of pride". Thenoas later brought Benjamin before the sitting Patriarch, Andronicus. Andronicus appreciated Benjamin's piety and ability, and took him on as a servant. He later ordained Benjamin to the priesthood, and eventually appointed him as his assistant, making Benjamin the heir presumptive to the patriarchy. In his position as assistant to the patriarch, Benjamin became acquainted with the intricacies of church affairs and within the Coptic Christian community. Benjamin became highly regarded for his work both within and without the church, which helped bring about his election to the patriarchate upon the death of Andronicus.

Few records exist regarding the early years of Benjamin's tenure. He is known to have issued encyclicals regarding the dates of the observance of Easter, and instructing the clergy in doctrinal matters. He also worked to help his church through the end of Sassinid rule. Fifteen of his encyclicals from this time, all of which have been lost, were known to have been collected into a single volume, which has also been lost.

In 623 A.D. the Persians captured Egypt. The Copts were prevented from practicing their religion, and their human and national rights were denied. Nevertheless, some Copts felt relief because alien Patriarchs were no longer appointed by Byzantium to oppress the Egyptian church. However, during that era the Persians ruined and destroyed many churches and monasteries.

The Byzantines regained control in 628. In 631, Cyrus, the Chalcedonian bishop of Phasis, was appointed by the Byzantine Emperor Heraclius as both the Melkite patriarch of Egypt and as the prefect in command of the military forces of that province of the empire. His duties in the latter position included curbing religious separatism in the province, by persuasion if possible but by arms if necessary. Benjamin, who was Cyrus's rival in the see of Alexandria, fled the city and sought refuge in the wilderness of St. Macarius, then in Upper Egypt. When persuasion failed, Cyrus began to use force. It was during this time that Benjamin's brother Mennas joined the rebellion against the rule of Cyrus for which he was eventually executed. Cyrus also confiscated the property of all clerics who followed the fugitive Benjamin, and many churches in Egypt were turned over to the Melkites by force.

Cyrus's troops seized Mennas and burned him with torches until, according to Severus ibn al-Muqaffa, ‘the fat dropped down from both his sides to the ground’. Still unshaken, his teeth were pulled out, and he was stuffed into a sack filled with sand and taken by a boat seven bowshots away from the shore. Three times he was offered his life if he accepted the Council of Chalcedon, and three times he refused, before he was thrown into the sea and drowned.

The Arab Muslim general 'Amr ibn al-'As began his campaign to conquer Egypt in 639, eventually invading Alexandria itself on 17 September 642. History does not record whether the members of the Coptic church assisted the Arabs in this campaign, although it is known that they did help the Melkites. However the Syriac chronicle of Dionysius I Telmaharoyo explicitly says that "Benjamin, the patriarch of the Orthodox in Egypt at that time, delivered the country to the Arab general ‘Amr b. al-‘As out of antipathy, that is enmity, towards Cyrus, the Chalcedonian patriarch in Egypt". During this time some individuals took the opportunity to ransack and burn churches. St. Mark's Church on the seashore was plundered, as well as the churches and monasteries that were surrounding it. 'Amr issued a safe conduct to Benjamin to return. Benjamin took some time in returning, eventually arriving at the end of 643 or the beginning of 644. Benjamin seems to have received funds from Sanutius, the ruler of Thebaid, for the rebuilding of the Church of St. Mark. Benjamin worked to bring back order to the affairs of the church, improve the morale of the Coptic population which had been devastated by the actions of Cyrus, and restore churches that were damaged during the recent conflict. He then left Alexandria again, to meet with 'Amr.

In the historic meeting between these two individuals, 'Amr is quoted as having said that he had never seen such an impressive man of God as Benjamin. The exact details of the meeting between these two parties remain unknown. The meeting was however conducted with a dignity which was not witnessed during the Asian battles. At the end of the conference, 'Amr restored to Benjamin all the rights that he had been denied by the Byzantines, and recognized him as the sole representative of the Egyptian people. Benjamin for his part publicly prayed for 'Amr and addressed him with admiration.

Benjamin worked to restore the Coptic church by renewing some of the policies which had been put in place by his predecessor Pope Damian of Alexandria. He also established amicable relations with 'Amr and the conquerors of Egypt. The Christian population of Egypt, however, remained divided between the Copts, Melkites, and other groups after the Arab conquest. Benjamin did however eventually prove successful in restoring a degree of unity to his fragmented population. Several Copts who had fled to the Libyan Pentapolis returned. A number of those who had left the Coptic church under duress for the Melkite church during the occupation, including the bishops Cyrus of Nikiou and Victor of Phiom, returned to the fold. He also exercised his new legal and judicial functions, even in accord with the Byzantine legal system, to the satisfaction of the new Islamic authorities.

Benjamin engaged in pontifical visitations to the dioceses and monasteries of the church, restoring properties wherever necessary. One of his more remarkable feats during this period was the recovery of the head of Saint Mark, which the Melkites had intended to try to smuggle back to Byzantium. The head was probably left in the sanctuary of the Monastery of Saint Macarius the Great in 645 or 647. Benjamin at the time also issued his canons to the monks of Saint Macarius.

Benjamin helped guide and comfort the Coptic community during the early days of Islamic rule. 'Amr's successor, 'Abdallah ibn Sa'd ibn Abī-al-Sarḥ ibn al-Ḥārith al-"Āmirī, demanded large amounts of money from the native Egyptian people whose resources were depleted. Benjamin's effort and intercession brought comfort to oppressed Copts.

Benjamin spent the last two years of his life encumbered by severe illness. After enduring a prolonged period of great suffering, he died on 3 January 661.

== Veneration ==
He is regarded as a saint by the Coptic church, and is commemorated in the Coptic Synaxarion on the 8th day of Toba. Benjamin is widely celebrated for his role in guiding the Coptic church through the turmoil and upheaval of the Islamic conquest. His contemporaries' regard for him was so high that a legend was widely circulated after his death that Benjamin's soul was not only carried to heaven by angels, but also escorted by Athanasius of Alexandria, Severus of Antioch, and Theodosius I of Alexandria.

== Notes ==
Preceded by Andronicus	Coptic Pope; 622–661	Succeeded by Agatho
