= Pope Cyril of Alexandria =

Pope Cyril of Alexandria may refer to:

- Cyril of Alexandria, 24th pope of the Coptic Orthodox Church from 412–444.
- Pope Cyril II of Alexandria, 67th pope of the Coptic Orthodox Church from 1078–1092.
- Pope Cyril III of Alexandria, 75th pope of the Coptic Orthodox Church from 1235–1243.
- Pope Cyril IV of Alexandria, 110th pope of the Coptic Orthodox Church from 1854–1961.
- Pope Cyril V of Alexandria, 112th pope of the Coptic Orthodox Church from 1874–1927.
- Pope Cyril VI of Alexandria, 116th pope of the Coptic Orthodox Church from 1959–1971.
