= Pope Theodoros =

Pope Theodoros may refer to:

- Pope Theodoros I of Alexandria, 45th pope of the Coptic Orthodox Church from 730–742.
- Pope Tawadros II of Alexandria, 118th and current pope of the Coptic Orthodox Church from 2012-present.
