= Damian of Alexandria =

Head of the Coptic Church from 576 to 605

Saint Damian of Alexandria
- Pope of Alexandria & Patriarch of the See of St. Mark
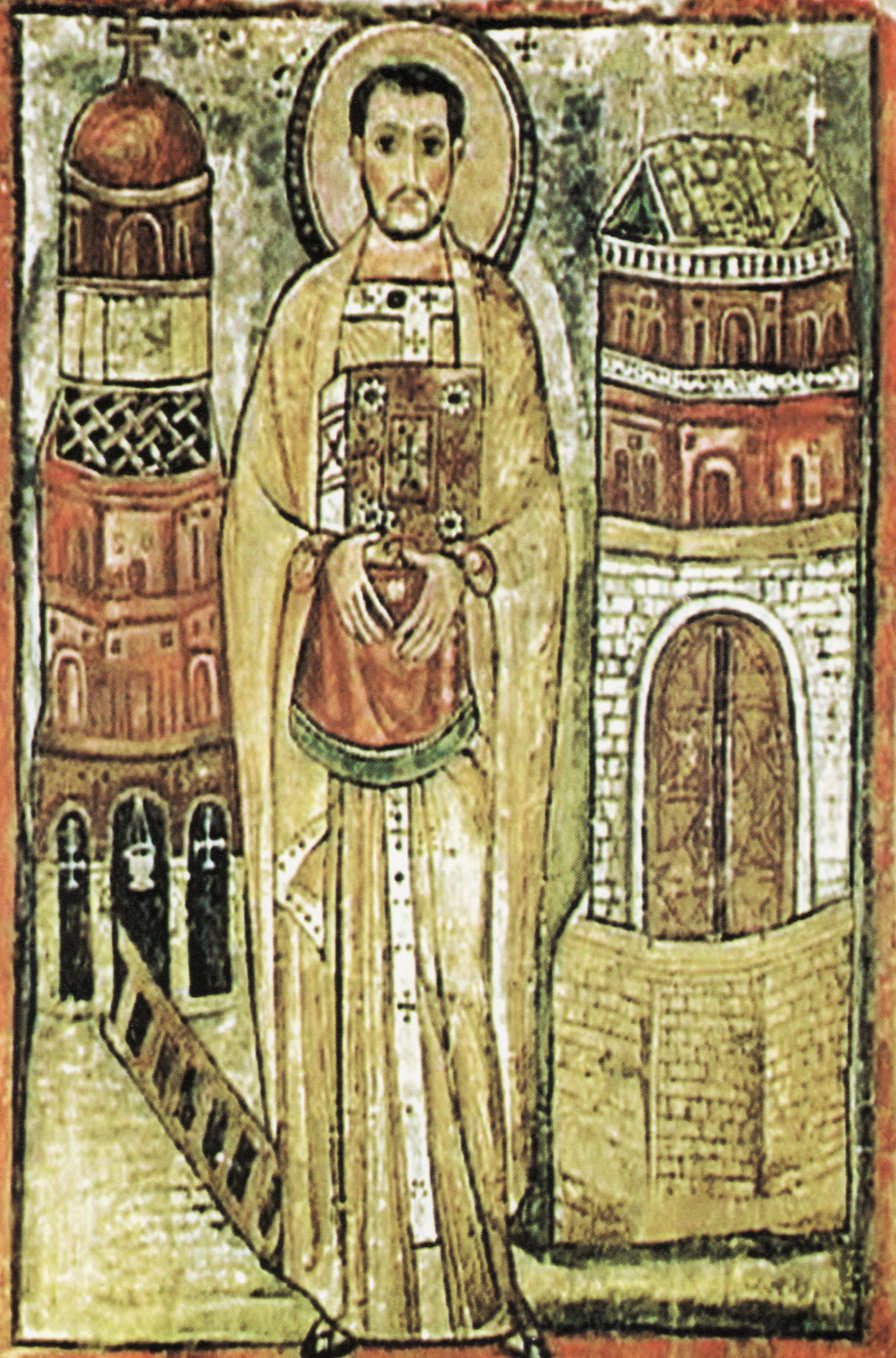
- Papacy began: 26 June 576
- Papacy ended: 25 June 605
- Predecessor: Peter IV
- Successor: Anastasius

Personal details
- Born: Syria
- Died: 25 June 605 Egypt
- Buried: Ennaton, monastery near Alexandria
- Denomination: Coptic Orthodox Christian
- Residence: Saint Mark's Church

Sainthood
- Feast day: 25 June (18 Paoni in the Coptic calendar)

Damian of Alexandria (Greek: Δαμιανός; died 605) was the Coptic pope and patriarch of Alexandria from 576.

Originally from Syria, where his brother was a prefect in Edessa, he became a monk in his early years and spent sixteen years in the Egyptian desert of Scete, where he was ordained a deacon in the monastery of St. John the Short. Afterward, he went to a monastery near Alexandria and continued to practice asceticism.

When Pope Peter IV of Alexandria was enthroned on the See of St. Mark, he made Damian a private secretary, during which Damian earned much esteem for his goodness. After Peter's death in 569, the bishops unanimously agreed to ordain him a patriarch. In addition to pastoring the church, he wrote many epistles and discourses, including a reaffirmation of the miaphysite and non-Chalcedonian views. He reigned for almost thirty-six years.

== Controversies ==
While serving as Patriarch, Damian performed some controversial actions in trying to complete his predecessor's attempt to depose Patriarch Paul II of Antioch by traveling secretly to Antioch to install a replacement Patriarch. Although this action did not have the support of all the Syrian bishops, Damian had enough support to convene a meeting and choose a replacement. However, the Chalcedonian patriarch, probably Gregory of Antioch, discovered the plan and prevented it, forcing Damian and his colleagues to flee. Damian then went to Constantinople, where he consecrated some bishops and took part in a church council, which he later repudiated.

The Synaxarium entry for Damian recounts the following two theological controversies in which he was involved:

- The first involved some Melitians who drank wine before Communion, claiming that Jesus had given the disciples two cups at the Last Supper and that only for the second did he say "This is My Blood." Damian explained that the first cup was the cup of the Jewish passover, which Jesus nullified with the second cup. Damian also informed them that the church canons ban those that eat before communion from partaking of the Eucharist. Damian's counsel persuaded some, but those who rejected his teaching were driven away.
- The second involves Damian's dialogue with Patriarch Peter of Antioch, in which Damian accused his colleague of tritheism and was in turn accused of Sabellianism. Although Damian pulled support for his understanding of the Trinity from the Bible and from the teaching of the early Church Fathers, he was never able to persuade Peter and, as a result, he ordered that Peter's name not be mentioned in the Divine Liturgy while Peter remained alive. The schism between the Alexandrian and Antiochene churches lasted for almost a decade after Damian's death.

Damian was very active in fighting views that he considered heretical, including not only tritheism, but also the Chalcedonians, Pope Leo's Tome, Bishop Julian of Halicarnassus, the Agnoetae, the Melitians, the Acephali, the Gaianites (supporters of a rival to Theodosius I), Stephen of Alexandria and Paul of Beth Ukame. The Barsanuphians split from the Acephali during the time of Damian and established their own episcopal hierarchy. Although most of Damian's writings are lost, he did influence many writers in his own time, such as John of Parallos, who, like Damian, focused on combating heresy.

== See also ==
- Tritheism

Religious titles
Preceded by Dorotheos	Coptic Pope; 569–605	Succeeded by Anastasius
