= Pope Cosmas I of Alexandria =

Head of the Coptic Church from 729 to 730

- Pope of Alexandria & Patriarch of the See of St. Mark
- Papacy began: 26 March 729
- Papacy ended: 28 May 730
- Predecessor: Alexander II
- Successor: Theodore

Personal details
- Born: Abu-Sair, Egypt
- Died: 28 May 730
- Buried: Saint Mark's Church
- Denomination: Coptic Orthodox Christian
- Residence: Saint Mark's Church

Pope Cosmas I of Alexandria (Coptic Ⲕⲟⲥⲙⲁⲥ), 44th Pope of Alexandria & Patriarch of the See of St. Mark.

Pope Cosmas I was from the town of Abu-Sair. He later became a monk in the Monastery of Saint Macarius the Great. He was ordained Pope of Alexandria and Patriarch of the See of St. Mark, against his will, on 30 Paremhat, 445 A.M. (26 March 729)

He prayed to God to let him die and his prayers were answered when departed on 3 Paoni, 446 A.M. (28 May 730), after one year, two months and two days of his enthronement.

Preceded by Alexander II	Coptic Pope; 729–730	Succeeded by Theodoros I
