= Pope Gabriel I of Alexandria =

Head of the Coptic Church from 909/910 to 920

Saint Gabriel of Alexandria
- Pope of Alexandria and Patriarch of the See of St. Mark
- Papacy began: 909/910
- Papacy ended: 28 February 920
- Predecessor: Michael III
- Successor: Cosmas III

Personal details
- Born: Egypt
- Died: 28 February 920
- Buried: Monastery of Saint Macarius the Great
- Denomination: Coptic Orthodox Christian
- Residence: Saint Mark's Church

Sainthood
- Feast day: 28 February (21 Amshir in the Coptic calendar)

Pope Gabriel I of Alexandria was the 57th Pope of Alexandria and Patriarch of the See of St. Mark from 909/910 to 920.

Religious titles
Preceded by Michael III	Coptic Pope; 909/910–921	Succeeded by Cosmas III
