= Pope Cosmas III of Alexandria =

Head of the Coptic Church from 920 to 932

Cosmas III of Alexandria
- Pope of Alexandria and Patriarch of the See of St. Mark
- Papacy began: 28 February 920
- Papacy ended: 27 February 932
- Predecessor: Gabriel I
- Successor: Macarius I

Personal details
- Born: Egypt
- Died: 27 February 932
- Buried: Monastery of Saint Macarius the Great
- Denomination: Coptic Orthodox Christian
- Residence: Saint Mark's Church

Sainthood
- Feast day: 27 February (4 Baramhat in the Coptic calendar)

Pope Cosmas III of Alexandria was the 58th Pope of Alexandria and Patriarch of the See of St. Mark from 920 to 932.

According to the History of the Patriarchs of Alexandria, after Abuna Peter of the Ethiopian Orthodox Church had become embroiled in a civil war and was forced into exile, and the Emperor of Ethiopia requested a new Abuna to replace him, Cosmas III refused to ordain a new Abuna because Peter was still alive. This led to strained relations between the two powers.

Religious titles
Preceded by Gabriel I	Coptic Pope; 920–932	Succeeded by Macarius I
