= Timothy IV of Alexandria =

Head of the Coptic Church from 517 to 535

Saint Timothy IV (III) of Alexandria
- Pope of Alexandria & Patriarch of the See of St. Mark
- Papacy began: 517
- Papacy ended: 7 February 535
- Predecessor: Dioscorus II
- Successor: Theodosius I

Personal details
- Born: Egypt
- Died: 20 February 535 Egypt
- Buried: Saint Mark's Church
- Denomination: Coptic Orthodox Christian
- Residence: Saint Mark's Church

Sainthood
- Feast day: 20 February (13 Amshir in the Coptic calendar)

Timothy IV (died 7 February 535) was the Patriarch of Alexandria from 517 until his death.

He is considered the 32nd Pope of the Coptic Orthodox Church as Timothy III, since the Copts do not recognize the third Timothy, Timothy Salophakiolos.

He was succeeded by Theodosius I.

== Notes ==
Preceded by Dioscorus II	Coptic Pope; 517–535	Succeeded by Theodosius I
Preceded by Dioscorus II	Patriarch of Alexandria; 517–535	Succeeded by Theodosius I
