= Pope Isaac of Alexandria =

Head of the Coptic Church from 690 to 692

- Pope of Alexandria and Patriarch of the See of St. Mark
- Papacy began: 690
- Papacy ended: 18 November 692
- Predecessor: John III
- Successor: Simeon I

Personal details
- Born: El-Borolos, Egypt
- Died: 18 November 692 Egypt
- Buried: Saint Mark's Church
- Denomination: Coptic Orthodox Christian
- Residence: Saint Mark's Church

Pope Isaac of Alexandria (Isaac the Just; fl. 690), 41st Pope of Alexandria and Patriarch of the See of St. Mark.

== Life ==
Isaac was born in El-Borolos of wealthy, God-fearing parents. They begot him long after their marriage. When they took him for baptism, the bishop who baptized him saw a cross of light over his head. The bishop laid the boy's hand over his head and prophesied concerning him saying, "The church of God will be entrusted to him." Then he told his parents, "Take care of him, for he is a chosen vessel of God."

When he grew they taught him writing, the Christian doctrine and church subjects. He read extensively in the biography of saints and he was filled with their pure life. He longed for the monastic life, so he left his parents and went to the desert of St. Macarius. He became a monk and disciple of Anba Zacharias, the Hegumen. The angel of the Lord had informed the elder father beforehand of his coming and the father received him with joy. One day, one of the holy elders saw him in the church and prophesied about him saying, "The church of Christ will be entrusted to him."

Pope John, the Patriarch of that time, asked for a monk to be his scribe and private secretary. The people who were present recommended this honorable Father Isaac. The Pope had Father Isaac brought to him. He gave him a book to scribe. Anba Isaac made mistakes in his writing deliberately, hoping that the Pope might send him back, for he had forsaken the glory of men. When the father knew his intention he said to him, "You have written well, do not leave this place."

When Father Isaac realized that the Patriarch would not let him return, he used all his knowledge and writing ability and his virtues became known. The Patriarch rejoiced in him exceedingly. Nevertheless, because Father Isaac was still longing for solitary life, the Patriarch allowed him to return to the desert.

When the death of Pope John drew near, he asked the Lord Christ to let it be known to him who would be his successor. In a vision, he was told that his disciple Isaac would sit on the chair after him. The Pope commanded the people that, with a divine revelation and by the order of the Lord, Isaac would sit on the chair after him.

When this father was enthroned to the See of St. Mark, the church was illumined. He restored many churches, especially the church of St. Mark the Evangelist, and the patriarchal cell. He suffered many tribulations and sat upon the throne for three and a half years, then departed in peace.

Religious titles
Preceded by Pope John III	Coptic Pope; 689–692	Succeeded by Pope Simeon I
