= Pope Peter IV of Alexandria =

Head of the Coptic Church from 567 to 576

Saint Peter IV of Alexandria
- Pope of Alexandria & Patriarch of the See of St. Mark
- Papacy began: 25 July 567
- Papacy ended: 18 June 576
- Predecessor: Theodosius I
- Successor: Damian

Personal details
- Born: Egypt
- Died: 18 June 576 Egypt
- Buried: Ennaton, monastery near Alexandria
- Denomination: Coptic Orthodox Christian
- Residence: Saint Mark's Church

Sainthood
- Feast day: 18 June (25 Paoni in the Coptic calendar)

Peter IV was the 34th Coptic Pope and Patriarch of Alexandria from 567 to 576. Peter IV succeeded the exiled Pope Theodosius I on the latter's death in 567.

Because the Melkites were in control of Alexandria at the time, Peter IV lived in exile in the Enaton monastic complex.

Preceded by Theodosius I	Coptic Pope; 565–569	Succeeded by Damian
