= Pope Dioscorus II of Alexandria =

Head of the Coptic Church from 516 to 517

Saint Dioscorus II of Alexandria
- Pope of Alexandria & Patriarch of the See of St. Mark
- Papacy began: 516
- Papacy ended: 27 October 517
- Predecessor: John II
- Successor: Timothy III

Personal details
- Born: Egypt
- Died: 27 October 517 Egypt
- Buried: Saint Mark's Church
- Denomination: Coptic Orthodox Christian
- Residence: Saint Mark's Church

Sainthood
- Feast day: 27 October (17 Babah in the Coptic calendar)

Pope Dioscorus II of Alexandria, 31st Pope of Alexandria & Patriarch of the See of St. Mark. He was chosen Patriarch after the departure of his predecessor, St. John. His first work after his enthronement to the See of St. Mark was writing an epistle to Pope Severus, Patriarch of Antioch concerning the Holy Trinity and the Incarnation. Pope Dioscorus had Severus's reply read from the pulpit.

Religious titles
Preceded by John II (III)	Coptic Pope; 516–517	Succeeded by Timothy III (IV)
Preceded by John II (III)	Patriarch of Alexandria; 516–517	Succeeded by Timothy III (IV)
