= Ben Alexander =

Ben Alexander may refer to:

- Ben Alexander (actor) (1911–1969), American film actor
- Ben Alexander (curler), English curler; see 2012 European Junior Curling Challenge
- Ben Alexander (rugby league) (1971–1992), Australian rugby league player
- Ben Alexander (rugby union) (born 1984), Australian rugby union player
- Benjamin F. Alexander, Alabama state representative
- Benjamin Alexander (1737–1768), son of minister John Alexander, doctor of medicine and translator of Morgagni's De sedibus et causis morborum
- Benjamin Alexander, winner of season 1 of Project Runway New Zealand
- Benjamin Alexander (skier) (born 1983), Jamaica's first Olympic alpine skier

== See also ==
- Benjamin of Alexandria (disambiguation)
