= Pope Theodosius of Alexandria =

Pope Theodosius of Alexandria may refer to:

- Pope Theodosius I of Alexandria, ruled in 535–567
- Pope Theodosius II of Alexandria, ruled in 730–742
- Pope Theodosius III of Alexandria, ruled in 1293–1300
