= Pope Alexander of Alexandria =

Pope Alexander of Alexandria may refer to:

- Pope Alexander I of Alexandria, Patriarch of Alexandria in 313–326 or 328
- Pope Alexander II of Alexandria, ruled in 702–729
