= Pope Michael III of Alexandria =

Head of the Coptic Church from 880 to 907

Saint Michael III of Alexandria
- Pope of Alexandria and Patriarch of the See of St. Mark
- Papacy began: 25 April 880
- Papacy ended: 16 March 907
- Predecessor: Shenouda I
- Successor: Gabriel I

Personal details
- Born: Egypt
- Died: 16 March 907
- Buried: Monastery of Saint Macarius the Great
- Denomination: Coptic Orthodox Christian
- Residence: Saint Mark's Church

Sainthood
- Feast day: 16 March (20 Baramhat in the Coptic calendar)

Pope Michael III of Alexandria (also known as Khail III) was the Coptic Pope of Alexandria and Patriarch of the See of St. Mark (880–907).

The patriarchal biography of Michael III comes from the writings of Michael of Damrū (Mīkhāʾil al-Damrāwī), bishop of Tinnis, in History of the Patriarchs of Alexandria. During the consecration of a church to St. Ptolemy in Xois (present day Sakha, Egypt), the bishop of the diocese was late to attend the consecration and came into conflict with Pope Michael, throwing the offered but not yet consecrated bread on the floor of the church. The Patriarch and other bishops unanimously decided to condemn the bishop of Xois. The deposed and vengeful bishop then convinced Ahmad ibn Tulun that the patriarch had vast wealth, and so ibn Tulun imprisoned Pope Michael for one year. The Coptic lay notables eventually negotiated for his release as paying 20,000 dinars in two installments. Michael of Damrū notes that the patriarch raised funds after his release from prison to pay the debt to ibn Tulun and also built a private latrine for himself in prison, at the cost of 300 dinars.

In 882, when forced to come up with the funds to free the patriarch from prison, the Coptic church sold a church, which had originally been a synagogue and was converted into the church during the Byzantine era, to the local Jewish community. This building was at one time believed to have later become the site of the Cairo Geniza.

Preceded by Shenouda I	Coptic Pope; 880–907	Succeeded by Gabriel I
