= Pope Timothy =

Pope Timothy may refer to:

- Pope Timothy I of Alexandria, 22nd pope of the Coptic Orthodox Church from 381–384
- Pope Timothy II of Alexandria, 26th pope of the Coptic Orthodox Church from 457–477
- Pope Timothy III of Alexandria, 32nd pope of the Coptic Orthodox Church from 517–535
