= John III of Alexandria =

John III of Alexandria may refer to:

- Pope John II (III) of Alexandria (Patriarch John III of Alexandria), ruled in 505–516
- Pope John III of Alexandria, ruled in 680–689
