= Timothy I of Alexandria =

Head of Coptic Church from 381 to 384

Saint Timothy I of Alexandria
- Pope of Alexandria & Patriarch of the See of St. Mark
- Papacy began: 381
- Papacy ended: 20 July 384
- Predecessor: Peter II
- Successor: Theophilus

Personal details
- Born: Egypt
- Died: 20 July 384 Egypt
- Buried: Dominicium, Alexandria
- Denomination: Church of Alexandria
- Residence: Saint Mark's Church

Sainthood
- Feast day: 20 July (26th day of Epip in the Coptic calendar).

Pope Timothy I of Alexandria, 22nd Pope of Alexandria & Patriarch of the See of St. Mark, died about 20 July 384. As the Pope of Alexandria, he was the head of the Coptic Church.

== Biography ==
When he was younger, he knew Athanasius, who was the 20th Pope of Alexandria, and this is thought to have had a major influence on his theological thinking. He also sold off his possessions to benefit the church and the poor. He would become known as Timothy I, the Destitute. He was the brother of Pope Peter II of Alexandria. He was unanimously chosen to become the 22nd bishop of the Alexandrian church. The date when his reign began is disputed, but seems to have been in the range of 378-381.

== Ecumenical Council at Constantinople ==
=== Background ===
He presided over the second First Council of Constantinople called by Emperor Theodosius. However, he was not originally in control. Rather, he arrived after the conference had already begun, led by Gregory of Nazianzus and Melitius of Antioch. But Melitius died soon thereafter and Gregory resigned his role as bishop, which resulted in Timothy presiding over part of the council. This council was also known as the Second Ecumenical Council, with the Council of Nicaea being the first. In addition to the 150 Orthodox (that is, conforming to the decisions of the Council of Nicaea), there were also 36 followers of Macedonius.

=== Precedence of Episcopal Sees ===
Constantinople, the city that hosted this council, had gained much in importance since the emperor Constantine the Great transformed it into an imperial capital. This council determined that the see of Alexandria ranked third in importance, after both Rome and Constantinople. Both Timothy and the Bishop of Rome rejected this claim, considering Alexandria to remain second only to Rome in the ranking of Christian cities.

=== Theological decisions ===
According to Coptic hagiography Timothy played a large part at the council. He condemned Macedonius for his belief that the Holy Spirit was created instead of existing from the beginning of time. Similarly, he questioned Sabellius for his belief that the Trinity was in fact a singularity, that each member was the same as each other member. He also argued with Apollinaris who claimed that Jesus did not have a human mind or soul because his divine nature replaced them. Each of these views was condemned as heretical and the originators, who refused to recant them, were excommunicated. However, this source should perhaps not be taken completely literally, since Macedonius seems likely to have died shortly after being deposed in 360 AD and Sabellius was excommunicated around 220 AD and therefore could not have been alive over a century and a half later when the council was held. Nevertheless, the author of the text puts Timothy in direct dialogue with those theologians he accuses of heresy, rather than their followers.

== Influence ==
Timothy was a big proponent of monastic orders, as exhibited partially in his writings. While his works on the topic are not extant, Sozomen used them as a source in his own writings. Timothy's influence on church law is also noticeable and arose from responses that he made to clerical queries in his role as the head of the church of Alexandria. Further, he has been remembered for his strong stand against the Arian heresy.

Titles of the Great Christian Church
Preceded by Peter II	Pope and Patriarch of Alexandria; 378–384	Succeeded by Theophilus
