= Pope Cyril V of Alexandria =

Head of the Coptic Church from 1874 to 1927

Saint Cyril V of Alexandria
- Pope of Alexandria & Patriarch of the See of St. Mark
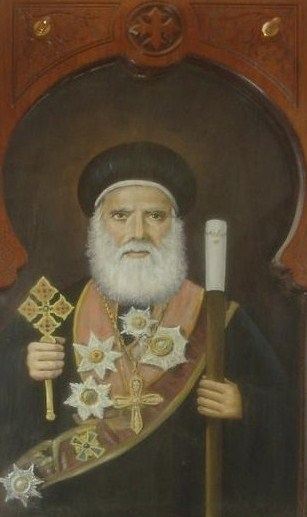
- Native name: البابا كيرلس الخامس
- Papacy began: 1 November 1874
- Papacy ended: 7 August 1927
- Predecessor: Demetrius II
- Successor: John XIX

Orders
- Ordination: 1851

Personal details
- Born: John (Youhanna) c.1831 Tezment, Beni Suef Governorate, Egypt
- Died: 7 August 1927 (aged 95–96) Egypt
- Buried: Saint Mark's Coptic Orthodox Cathedral (Azbakeya)
- Denomination: Coptic Orthodox Christian
- Residence: Saint Mark's Coptic Orthodox Cathedral (Azbakeya)

Sainthood
- Feast day: 7 August (1 Mesori in the Coptic calendar)

Papal styles of Saint Cyril V
- Reference style: His Holiness
- Spoken style: Your Holiness
- Religious style: Pope and Patriarch
- Posthumous style: Saint

Pope Cyril V of Alexandria (Abba Kyrillos V) was the 112th Pope of Alexandria & Patriarch of the See of St. Mark, reigning for 52 years, 9 months and 6 days. He was the longest-serving Pope in the history of the Coptic Orthodox Church. He was born as Youhanna (John) in 1824 or 1830/1831 according to different accounts and he died on 7 August 1927.

== A monk ==
He joined the Al Baramous Monastery in the Nitrian Desert, where he served as abbot prior to his elevation to Pope.

== The Coptic Pope ==
The General Congregation Council (Elmagles Elmelly Ela'am) elected him Pope, with seat in the Saint Mark's Coptic Orthodox Cathedral in Azbakeya in Cairo throughout his papacy. The secretary of the council was Boutros pasha Ghali بطرس غالي, later Prime Minister of Egypt. Cyril spent most of his papacy at loggerheads with the council and objecting to its interference in church matters. At the beginning of his papacy there was a dispute with the council, which Cyril won.

In general, his papacy was an era of regeneration for the Coptic Orthodox Church and he continued the work begun by Pope Cyril IV (1854–1861) in educational reform.

Notable men of the Coptic Church during his papacy included saint Anba Abraam, Bishop of Fayoum, Labib Ekladius, and Habib Girgis.

In 1881 the Ethiopian Emperor Yohannes IV asked Pope Cyril V to ordain a metropolitan and three Bishops for the Ethiopian Empire. Cyril chose the four monks who had left El-Muharraq Monastery with Anba Abraam: Abouna Petros, Abouna Marqos, Abouna Matewos and Abouna Luqas.

During his Papacy, Egypt under British occupation in 1882 following the Anglo-Egyptian War which was subsequent to the Urabi Revolt, and he witnessed the Egyptian Revolution of 1919 as well as the formal independence of Egypt in 1922.

When news of his death reached Ethiopia, Empress Zewditu and Ras Tafari ordered requiem masses to be said throughout Ethiopia, and that government offices be closed for three days.

== See also ==
- List of Coptic Orthodox Popes
- Pope of the Coptic Orthodox Church
- Catechetical School of Alexandria
- List of Copts
- Habib Girgis

== Sources ==
- Coptic Orthodox Synaxarium (Book of Saints)
- The Renewal of Coptic Orthodoxy in the Twentieth Century
- Pope Kyrillos V and the reopening of the Theological School of Alexandria in 1893, and appointment of Archdeacon Habib Guirguis as its Dean in 1918

Oriental Orthodox titles
Preceded by Demetrius II	Coptic Pope; 1874–1927	Succeeded by John XIX
