= Pope Macarius I of Alexandria =

Head of the Coptic Church from 932 to 952

- Pope of Alexandria and Patriarch of the See of St. Mark
- Papacy began: 932
- Papacy ended: 952
- Predecessor: Cosmas III
- Successor: Theophilus II

Personal details
- Born: Egypt
- Died: 952
- Buried: Monastery of Saint Macarius the Great
- Denomination: Coptic Orthodox Christian
- Residence: Saint Mark's Church

Pope Macarius I of Alexandria was the 59th Pope of Alexandria and Patriarch of the See of St. Mark from 932 to 952. He is commemorated in the Coptic Synaxarion on the 24th day of Baramhat.

Religious titles
| Preceded by Cosmas III | Coptic Pope; 932–952 | Succeeded by Theophilus II |
