= Pope Simeon =

Pope Simeon may refer to:

- Pope Simeon I of Alexandria, 42nd pope of the Coptic Orthodox Church from 692–700.
- Pope Simeon II of Alexandria, 51st pope of the Coptic Orthodox Church in 830.
