= Pope Dioscorus =

Pope Dioscorus may refer to:

- Pope Dioscorus I of Alexandria, ruled in 444–454
- Pope Dioscorus II of Alexandria, ruled in 516–517
