= Pope Macarius =

Pope Macarius may refer to:

- Pope Macarius I of Alexandria, ruled in 933–953
- Pope Macarius II of Alexandria, ruled in 1102–1128
- Pope Macarius III of Alexandria, ruled in 1944–1945
