= Pope Michael =

Pope Michael may refer to:

Coptic Orthodox Popes of Alexandria:

- Pope Michael I of Alexandria (743–767)
- Pope Michael II of Alexandria (849–851)
- Pope Michael III of Alexandria (880–907)
- Pope Michael IV of Alexandria (1092–1102)
- Pope Michael V of Alexandria (1145–1146)
- Pope Michael VI of Alexandria (1475–1477)

Other:

- David Bawden, an American who claimed the Roman Catholic papacy (1990–2022) under the papal name Michael
- Rogelio del Rosario Martinez, a Filipino papacy claimant who succeeded Bawden and took the name of Michael II
