= Pope Agatho of Alexandria =

Head of the Coptic Church from c. 661 to c. 677

Saint Agathon of Alexandria
- Pope of Alexandria & Patriarch of the See of St. Mark
- Papacy began: 661 or 662
- Papacy ended: 677 or 680
- Predecessor: Benjamin I
- Successor: John III

Personal details
- Born: Egypt
- Died: 26 October 680 Egypt
- Denomination: Coptic Orthodox Christian

Sainthood
- Feast day: 26 October (16 Babah in the Coptic calendar)

Saint Agathon of Alexandria, was the 39th Pope of Alexandria & Patriarch of the See of St. Mark. St. Agathon was a disciple of Pope Benjamin I, the 38th Pope of the Coptic Orthodox Church so when Pope Benjamin had to flee to avoid persecution by the Chalcedonians, Agathon remained and led the church.

Agathon served like this until Pope Benjamin returned and died, at which time Agathon was officially named the pope of the Coptic Orthodox Church. This happened during the time of the Muslim conquest of Egypt and when Muawiyah I was ruling. Unlike most popes who first serve as monks, Agathon had never been a monk prior to becoming pope- yet he was successful. During his time as pope, the building of St. Macarius Church in the monastery at Wadi El Natrun was completed.

Like many others before and after, according to the Coptic Orthodox Church, he was harassed. Sometime during his papacy, he was persecuted by a Melkite Byzantine Patriarch named Theodocius, who through his authority, levied large taxes on Agathon, made the people hate him and asked that he be killed. For this reason, Agathon stayed hidden in his cell until the threat of Theodocius went away. Based on church beliefs, he chose his successor based on a dream where an angel told him who should follow him.

Preceded by Benjamin I	Coptic Pope; 662–680	Succeeded by John III
