= Meshir =

- Native name: Coptic: Ⲙⲉϣⲓⲣ
- Calendar: Coptic calendar
- Month number: 6
- Number of days: 30
- Gregorian equivalent: February–March

Meshir (Coptic: Ⲙⲉϣⲓⲣ), also known as Mechir or Mecheir (Ancient Greek: Μεχίρ, Mekhír) and Amshir (Egyptian Arabic: أمشير [ʔæmˈʃiːɾ]), is the sixth month of the ancient Egyptian and Coptic calendars. It lies between February 8 and March 9 of the Gregorian calendar.

The month of Meshir is also the second month of the Season of Proyet (Growth and Emergence) in ancient Egypt, when the Nile floods recede and the crops start to grow throughout the land of Egypt.

== Name ==
The name of the month of Meshir comes from Mechir, the Ancient Egyptian God genius of wind.

== Coptic Synaxarium of the month of Meshir ==
Coptic	Julian	Gregorian	Commemorations
Meshir 1	January 26	February 8	Commemoration of the Second Ecumenical Council of Constantinople, in 381.; Commemoration of the Consecration of the Church of St. Peter, the Seal of Martyrs.
Meshir 2	January 27	February 9	Departure of St. Paul, the First Hermit.; Departure of St. Longinus, Abbot of El-Zugag Monastery.
Meshir 3	January 28	February 10	Departure of St. James, the Ascetic.
Meshir 4	January 29	February 11	Martyrdom of St. Agabus, one of the Seventy Disciples.
Meshir 5	January 30	February 12	Departure of St. Agrippinus, the 10th Pope of Alexandria.; Commemoration of the Sts. Anba Bishay and St. Anba Abanoub.; Departure of St. Apollo, friend of St. Anba Abib.; Commemoration of the Relocation of the Relics of the Forty-Nine Elders of the Wilderness of Scetis.
Meshir 6	January 31	February 13	Appearance of the Body of St. Hippolytus of Rome.; Martyrdom of the Sts. Abakir, John, the Three Virgins and their Mother.
Meshir 7	February 1	February 14	Departure of St. Alexander II, the 43rd Pope of Alexandria.; Departure of St. Theodoros I, the 45th Pope of Alexandria.
Meshir 8	February 2	February 15	Feast of Presenting the Lord Christ in the Temple.; Martyrdom of the Twenty-One Men in Libya.; Commemoration of all contemporary Martyrs.
Meshir 9	February 3	February 16	Departure of St. Barsauma, the Father of the Syrian Monks.; Martyrdom of St. Paul the Syrian.
Meshir 10	February 4	February 17	Martyrdom of St. James the Apostle, Son of Alphaeus.; Martyrdom of St. Justus, Son of Roman Emperor Numerian.; Departure of St. Isidore of Pelusium.; Martyrdom of St. Philo, Bishop of the Persians.
Meshir 11	February 5	February 18	Martyrdom of St. Fabian (Fabrianus), Bishop of Rome.
Meshir 12	February 6	February 19	Commemoration of Michael, the Archangel.; Departure of St. Gelasius.
Meshir 13	February 7	February 20	Martyrdom of St. Sergius of Atripe, His Father, Mother, Sister, and Many Others with Them.; Departure of St. Timothy III, the 32nd Pope of Alexandria.
Meshir 14	February 8	February 21	Departure of St. Severus, Patriarch of Antioch.; Departure of St. James (Yacobus), the 50th Pope of Alexandria.
Meshir 15	February 9	February 22	Departure of St. Zechariah, the Prophet.; Consecration of the First Church Dedicated for the Forty Martyrs of Sebaste.; Departure of Saint Paphnoute (Paphnotius).
Meshir 16	February 10	February 23	Departure of St. Elizabeth, the mother of St. John the Baptist.
Meshir 17	February 11	February 24	Martyrdom of St. Mina, the Monk.
Meshir 18	February 12	February 25	Departure of St. Malatius the Confessor, Patriarch of Antioch.
Meshir 19	February 13	February 26	Commemoration of the Relocation of the Relics of St. Martianus, the Monk.
Meshir 20	February 14	February 27	Departure of St. Peter, the 21st Pope of Alexandria.; Commemoration of Sts. Basil, Theodore and Timothy, the Martyrs.
Meshir 21	February 15	February 28	Commemoration of the Holy Virgin Saint Mary, the Mother of God (Theotokos).; Martyrdom of St. Onesimus, the Disciple of St. Paul.; Departure of St. Gabriel, the 57th Pope of Alexandria.; Departure of St. Zacharias, Bishop of Sakha.
Meshir 22	February 16	March 1	Departure of St. Maruta (Maruthas), the Bishop of Marjferqat.
Meshir 23	February 17	March 2	Martyrdom of St. Eusebius, Son of Basilides, the Minister.
Meshir 24	February 18	March 3	Departure of St. Agapetus (Agapius), the Bishop.; Martyrdom of St. Timothy and St. Matthias.
Meshir 25	February 19	March 4	Martyrdom of Sts. Archippus, Philemon and Lycia the Virgin.; Martyrdom of St. Quona (Kona) and St. Mina.; Commemoration of St. Fana, the Hermit.
Meshir 26	February 20	March 5	Departure of Hosea, the Prophet.; Martyrdom of St. Zadok and the 128 who were with Him.
Meshir 27	February 21	March 6	Departure of St. Eustathius, Patriarch of Antioch.
Meshir 28	February 22	March 7	Martyrdom of St. Theodore, the Roman.
Meshir 29	February 23	March 8	Martyrdom of St. Polycarp, Bishop of Smyrna.
Meshir 30	February 24	March 9	Appearance of the Head of St. John the Baptist.; Departure of St. Cyril VI (Kyrillos), the 116th Pope of Alexandria.
