= Pope Demetrius =

Pope Demetrius may refer to:

- Pope Demetrius I of Alexandria, ruled in 189–232
- Pope Demetrius II of Alexandria, ruled in 1861–1870
