= Pope Shenouda =

Pope Shenouda may refer to:

- Pope Shenouda I of Alexandria, 55th pope of the Coptic Orthodox Church from 859–880.
- Pope Shenouda II of Alexandria, 65th pope of the Coptic Orthodox Church from 1032–1046.
- Pope Shenouda III of Alexandria, 117th pope of the Coptic Orthodox Church from 1971–2012.
