= Pope Peter =

Pope Peter may refer to:

- Saint Peter, regarded by the Christian tradition to be the first bishop of Rome
- Pope Peter I of Alexandria, Pope of Alexandria 300–311
- Pope Peter II of Alexandria, 373–380
- Pope Peter III of Alexandria, 477–490
- Pope Peter IV of Alexandria, 565–569
- Pope Peter V of Alexandria, 1340–1348
- Pope Peter VI of Alexandria, 1718–1726
- Pope Peter VII of Alexandria, 1809–1852

Others

- Manuel Alonso Corral, or Pope Peter II of the schismatic Palmarian Catholic Church from 2005 to 2011
- Joseph Odermatt, or Pope Peter III of the schismatic Palmarian Catholic Church, the incumbent pope since 2016

== See also ==
- Peter Pope (disambiguation)
- Pope Peter II (disambiguation)
- List of Greek Orthodox Patriarchs of Alexandria
