= Pope Theodoros I of Alexandria =

Head of the Coptic Church from 730 to 742

Saint Theodore of Alexandria
- Pope of Alexandria & Patriarch of the See of St. Mark
- Papacy began: 730
- Papacy ended: 14 February 742
- Predecessor: Cosmas I
- Successor: Michael I

Personal details
- Born: Egypt
- Died: 14 February 742
- Buried: Saint Mark's Church
- Denomination: Coptic Orthodox Christian
- Residence: Saint Mark's Church

Sainthood
- Feast day: 14 February (7 Amshir in the Coptic calendar)

Pope Theodoros I of Alexandria, also known as St. Theodorus (Theodore), was the 45th Pope of Alexandria and Patriarch of the See of St. Mark from 730 to 742. He was a monk in a monastery near Mariout, which was known as the monastery of Tanboura, under the guidance of a virtuous elder called Yoannis (John). Coptic literature states that Yoannis was inspired by the Holy Spirit that his disciple Theodoros would one day become a Pope and he told those who were in authority.

It is said that Theodoros struggled in his worship, and was perfect in his humility and meekness. He was selected to become the Pope of Alexandria. During his papacy he shepherded his flock by reading and preaching to his people, especially on Sundays and on feast days. He completed 12 years of papacy and died in peace.

He is also known as Theodosius II in Coptic history.

His feast day is 7 Amshir.

Religious titles
Preceded by Cosmas I	Coptic Pope; 730–742	Succeeded by Michael I
