= Peter Pope =

Peter Pope may refer to:

- Peter Pope (Canadian politician) (1933–2007), Canadian businessman and politician
- Peter Pope (MP), in 1386 MP for Rochester
- Peter Pope (composer) (1917–1991), British composer
- Peter Pope (translator), Indian Anglican translator, interpreter, and missionary

== See also ==
- Pope Peter (disambiguation)
