= Pope Alexander =

There have been nine popes and one antipope named Alexander.

- Pope Alexander I (saint; ca. 107–115)
- Pope Alexander II (1061–1073)
- Pope Alexander III (1159–1181)
- Pope Alexander IV (1254–1261)
  - Antipope Alexander V (1409–1410)
- Pope Alexander VI (1492–1503)
- Pope Alexander VII (1655–1667)
- Pope Alexander VIII (1689–1691)
- Pope Alexander I of Alexandria (fl. 313–326)
- Pope Alexander II of Alexandria (fl. 704–729)

== See also ==
- Alexander Pope (1688–1744), English poet
