= Pope Simeon I of Alexandria =

Head of the Coptic Church from 692 to 699

Saint Simeon I of Alexandria
- Pope of Alexandria & Patriarch of the See of St. Mark
- Papacy began: 19 December 692
- Papacy ended: 699
- Predecessor: Isaac
- Successor: Alexander II

Personal details
- Born: Syria
- Died: 699 Egypt
- Buried: Saint Mark's Church
- Denomination: Coptic Orthodox Christian
- Residence: Saint Mark's Church

Sainthood
- Feast day: (24 Abib in the Coptic calendar)

Pope Simeon I of Alexandria (fl. 695) was the 42nd Pope of Alexandria & Patriarch of the See of St. Mark.

He was the first pope elected from among the Syrians to the See of St. Mark. He was a monk in the Pateron Monastery (Deir Al-Zugag). The Synaxarium links Simeon to his Syrian heritage by mentioning to his readers that Severus of Antioch was buried in the monastery. The Synaxarium attests to his saintly life. There were two attempts to poison Pope Simeon and he survived both of them. Pope Simeon was a great reformer. He fought very fiercely against a new trend among Coptic men who began emulating the Arabs by taking more than one wife.

Preceded by Isaac	Coptic Pope; 692–700	Succeeded by Alexander II
