= Pope Cyril IV of Alexandria =

Head of the Coptic Church from 1854 to 1861

- Pope of Alexandria & Patriarch of the See of St. Mark
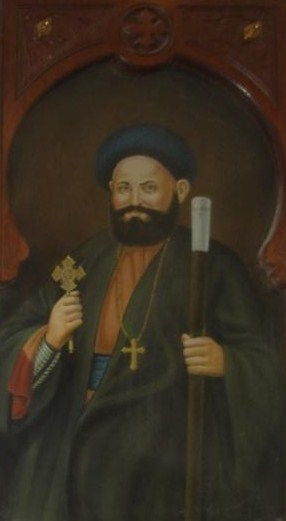
- Papacy began: 5 June 1854
- Papacy ended: 31 January 1861
- Predecessor: Peter VII
- Successor: Demetrius II

Personal details
- Born: David (Daoud) c.1816 Sawamaa of the district of the city of Girga, Egypt
- Died: 31 January 1861 Egypt
- Buried: Saint Mark's Coptic Orthodox Cathedral (Azbakeya)
- Denomination: Coptic Orthodox Christian
- Residence: Saint Mark's Coptic Orthodox Cathedral (Azbakeya)

Pope Cyril IV of Alexandria (Abba Kyrillos IV), Coptic: Ⲡⲁⲡⲁ Ⲁⲃⲃⲁ Ⲕⲩⲣⲓⲗⲗⲟⲩ ⲇ̅ 110th Pope of Alexandria & Patriarch of the See of St. Mark. He was born David (Daoud) in 1816. Despite his relatively short papacy, he is regarded as the "Father of Reform" of the Coptic Orthodox Church in modern times. He is credited for establishing a great printing house and printing many Church books.

While abbot of the Monastery of Saint Anthony, he was sent to Ethiopia at the request of Peter VII to mediate between Abouna Salama and his opponents in the Ethiopian Church, as well as "prevent the sympathies for the Catholic missionaries and their teaching from increasing further." While he was in Ethiopia, the Patriarch died. The former Ichege Gebre Mariam, who was in Cairo to press for the Ethiopian rights to the convent in Jerusalem, used this opportunity to exert pressure for his cause. As a result, the majority choice for Patriarch Peter's successor, Daoud, was kept from taking his seat for two years.

As Patriarch, Cyril returned to Ethiopia at the request of viceroy Sa'id of Egypt, the first recorded visit by the head of the Coptic church to that country. Emperor Tewodros II, whom Trimingham described as "unable to conceive how a Christian prelate could consent to act as the envoy of a Muslim prince", received Pope Cyril unfavorably in December 1856. Sven Rubenson records that when the Patriarch expressed an interest in reviewing the Emperor's army, Tewodros II suspected him of being a spy, and confined him with Abouna Salama to their house; only after the Ethiopian clergy intervened, were both men released. During a flare-up of tempers between the Abouna and Emperor in November of the following year, which led to the Abouna excommunicating Emperor Tewodros II, Patriarch Cyril lifted the interdict against the wishes of Abouna Salama; the Patriarch left Ethiopia soon after.

== Notes ==
Oriental Orthodox titles
Preceded by Peter VII	Coptic Pope; 1854–1861	Succeeded by Demetrius II
