= Pope John III of Alexandria =

Head of the Coptic Church from 680 to 689

- Pope of Alexandria & Patriarch of the See of St. Mark
- Papacy began: 680
- Papacy ended: 689
- Predecessor: Agathon
- Successor: Isaac

Personal details
- Born: Samanoud, Egypt
- Died: 689 Egypt
- Buried: Saint Mark's Church
- Denomination: Coptic Orthodox Christian
- Residence: Saint Mark's Church

Pope John III of Alexandria (fl. 680), 40th Pope of Alexandria & Patriarch of the See of St. Mark.

He was originally from Samanoud a city in the North of Egypt, hence also known as Pope John III of Samanoud. During his papacy the Muslim ruler in Damascus was Marwan I as after the death of Yazid, the son of Mu'âwiyah and his son Muawiya II, Marwan I took control of the East and of Egypt.

Marwan I made his sons governors over all the provinces. He appointed his son Abd al-Aziz ibn Marwan governor of Egypt and his eldest son Abd al-Malik ibn Marwan governor of Damascus, the latter later becoming his father's successor.

At that stage the Umayyad rulers were still in war with Abdullah bin Zubayr.

And when Abd al-Aziz became governor of Egypt, Pope John III wrote from Alexandria to Misr to the two scribes who presided over his divan, to make known to them what had been done concerning the seal, which was set upon all the places, and the trouble with the Chalcedonians from which he was suffering. Thereupon the said scribes sent messengers to Alexandria with instructions that the seal should be broken in the places named, and that all the property of the Church should be delivered to the Father Patriarch.

In 680, Pope John III rebuilt Saint Mark's Cathedral in Alexandria.

Preceded by Agathon	Coptic Pope; 680–689	Succeeded by Isaac
