= Pope Athanasius =

Pope Athanasius may refer to:

- Pope Athanasius I of Alexandria (c. 293 – 2 May 373), Coptic Pope
- Pope Athanasius II of Alexandria (died 496), Coptic Pope
- Pope Athanasius III of Alexandria (fl. 1250–1261), Coptic Pope
