= Pope Mark of Alexandria =

Pope Mark of Alexandria may refer to:

- Mark the Evangelist, also known as Pope Mark I of Alexandra, first pope of the Coptic Orthodox Church
- Pope Mark II of Alexandria, 49th pope of the Coptic Orthodox Church
- Pope Mark III of Alexandria, 73rd pope of the Coptic Orthodox Church
- Pope Mark IV of Alexandria, 84th pope of the Coptic Orthodox Church
- Pope Mark V of Alexandria, 98th pope of the Coptic Orthodox Church
- Pope Mark VI of Alexandria, 101st pope of the Coptic Orthodox Church
- Pope Mark VII of Alexandria, 106th pope of the Coptic Orthodox Church
- Pope Mark VIII of Alexandria, 108th pope of the Coptic Orthodox Church

== See also ==
- Pope Mark, 34th pope of the Catholic Church
