= Pope Demetrius II of Alexandria =

Head of the Coptic Church from 1861 to 1870

- Pope of Alexandria & Patriarch of the See of St. Mark
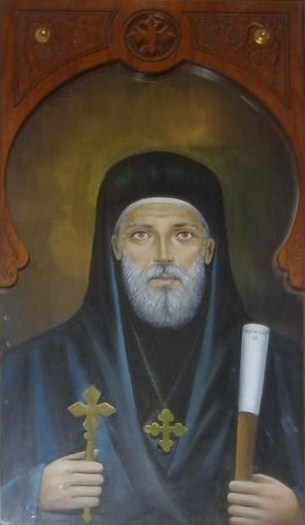
- Papacy began: 15 June 1861
- Papacy ended: 18 January 1870
- Predecessor: Cyril IV
- Successor: Cyril V

Personal details
- Born: Galda, Minya Governorate, Egypt
- Died: 18 January 1870 Egypt
- Buried: Saint Mark's Coptic Orthodox Cathedral (Azbakeya)
- Denomination: Coptic Orthodox Christian
- Residence: Saint Mark's Coptic Orthodox Cathedral (Azbakeya)

Pope Demetrius II of Alexandria was the 111th pope of Alexandria and patriarch of the see of St. Mark.

Demetrius was born in the village of Galda, the governorate of El-Minya, Egypt. He became a monk in the Monastery of Saint Macarius the Great. When the abbot of the monastery departed, he was chosen to replace him and did well in managing the monastery. For his good virtues, he was ordained a Pope to succeed the great Pope Cyril IV, the 110th Patriarch. He completed the construction of Saint Mark Cathedral, built several buildings in the patriarchate, and in his monastery in the area of Atrees. On 17 November 1869, he attended the celebration for the opening of the Suez Canal, and met several kings. He was well respected by Ottoman Sultan Abdulaziz. When this Pope came before him to greet him, the Pope kissed the sultan on his chest. The Sultan was troubled, and the guards asked the Pope why he did that. The Pope said, "The book of God says: 'The king's heart in the hand of the Lord' (Proverbs 21:1), when I kissed his heart, I have kissed the hand of God." The Sultan was pleased with his answer, and gave him many farm lands to help the poor and the schools. The Pope traveled on a governmental boat to visit the churches in Upper Egypt. He regained those who were lost and strengthened the faithful.

After he had completed in the papacy seven years, seven months, and seven days, he departed in peace on the eve of Epiphany, the 11th day of Tubah in the Coptic calendar (January 18, 1870).

Oriental Orthodox titles
Preceded by Cyril IV	Coptic Pope; 1861–1870	Succeeded by Cyril V
