= Pope Benjamin of Alexandria =

Pope Benjamin of Alexandria may refer to:

- Pope Benjamin I of Alexandria, ruled in 623–661
- Pope Benjamin II of Alexandria, ruled in 1327–1339
