= Paopi =

- Native name: Coptic: Ⲡⲁⲱⲡⲉ
- Calendar: Coptic calendar
- Month number: 2
- Number of days: 30
- Gregorian equivalent: October–November

Paopi (Coptic: Ⲡⲁⲱⲡⲉ, Paōpe), also known as Phaophi (Ancient Greek: Φαωφί, Phaōphí) and Babah (Arabic: بابه, Baba), is the second month of the ancient Egyptian and Coptic calendars. It lasts between 11 October and 9 November of the Gregorian calendar, unless the previous Coptic year was a leap year.

The month of Paopi is the second month of the Season of Akhet (Inundation) in Ancient Egypt, when the Nile floods inundated the land. (They have not done so since the construction of the High Dam at Aswan.)

== Name ==
Paopi means "that of Opet", for the month originally celebrated the "Beautiful feast of Opet". The ancient Egyptians believed that during this month, the sun deity Amon-Ra travelled from Karnak to Luxor to celebrate the famous festival of Opet.

== Coptic Synaxarium of the month of Paopi ==
Coptic	Julian	Gregorian	Commemorations
Paopi 1	September 28	October 11	Martyrdom of St. Anastasia.
Paopi 2	September 29	October 12	Arrival of St. Severus, Patriarch of Antioch, to the Egyptian Monasteries.
Paopi 3	September 30	October 13	Departure of St. Simon II, the 51st Pope of Alexandria.; Martyrdom of St. John the Soldier
Paopi 4	October 1	October 14	Martyrdom of St. Bacchus, the friend of St. Sergius.
Paopi 5	October 2	October 15	Martyrdom of St. Paul, Patriarch of Constantinople.
Paopi 6	October 3	October 16	Departure of the Hannah the Prophetess, mother of Samuel, the Prophet.
Paopi 7	October 4	October 17	Departure of St. Paul of Tamouh.; Martyrdom of St. Menas & St. Hasina
Paopi 8	October 5	October 18	Martyrdom of St. Matra; Martyrdom of the Sts Hor, Susanna (Tosia) and her children, & St. Agathon the Hermit
Paopi 9	October 6	October 19	Departure of St. Eumenius, the 7th Pope of Alexandria.; Eclipse of the Sun in the year 1242 AD.; Commemoration of St. Simon the Bishop
Paopi 10	October 7	October 20	Martyrdom of St. Sergius, the friend of St. Bacchus.
Paopi 11	October 8	October 21	Departure of St. James, Patriarch of Antioch; Departure of St. Pelagia.
Paopi 12	October 9	October 22	Commemoration of Michael, the Archangel.; Martyrdom of St. Matthew the Evangelist.; Departure of St. Demetrius, the 12th Pope of Alexandria.
Paopi 13	October 10	October 23	Departure of St. Zacharias, the Monk
Paopi 14	October 11	October 24	Departure of St. Philip of Caesarea, one of the Seven Deacons.
Paopi 15	October 12	October 25	Martyrdom of St. Panteleimon, the Physician.
Paopi 16	October 13	October 26	Commemoration of St. Carpus, St. Apollos (Papylus), and St. Peter, disciples of St. Isaiah the Hermit; Departure of St. Agathon, the 39th Pope of Alexandria.
Paopi 17	October 14	October 27	Departure of St. Dioscorus II, the 31st Pope of Alexandria.
Paopi 18	October 15	October 28	Departure of St. Theophilus, the 23rd Pope of Alexandria.
Paopi 19	October 16	October 29	Assembly of the Council at Antioch against Paul of Samosata, in 280 AD.; Martyrdom of St. Theophilus and his wife in Fayyum
Paopi 20	October 17	October 30	Departure of St. John Colobos (the Short).
Paopi 21	October 18	October 31	Departure of Joel, the Prophet.; Commemoration of the Holy Virgin Saint Mary, the Mother of God (Theotokos).; Relocation of the body of Lazarus.; Departure of St. Freig (Abba Tegi, or Anba Ruwais); Departure of Mother Irini.
Paopi 22	October 19	November 1	Martyrdom of St. Luke the Evangelist.
Paopi 23	October 20	November 2	Martyrdom of St. Dionysius, Bishop of Corinth.; Departure of St. Joseph, the 52nd Pope of Alexandria.
Paopi 24	October 21	November 3	Departure of St. Hilarion, the Anchorite.; Martyrdom of the Sts. Paul, Longinus and Dinah (Zena)
Paopi 25	October 22	November 4	Departure of the St. Abib & St. Apollo.; Consecration of the Church of St. Julius of Aqfahs in Alexandria
Paopi 26	October 23	November 5	Martyrdom of St. Simon the Apostle.; Commemoration of the Seven Martyrs on the Mount of St. Antony
Paopi 27	October 24	November 6	Martyrdom of St. Macarius, Bishop of Edkow (Tkoou)
Paopi 28	October 25	November 7	Martyrdom of the St. Marcian (Marcianus) & St. Mercurius
Paopi 29	October 26	November 8	Martyrdom of St. Demetrius of Thessaloniki.
Paopi 30	October 27	November 9	Consecration of the Church of St. Mark the Evangelist and the Apparition of his Holy head; Departure of St. Abraham (Ibrahim) the Hermit of Memphis

== See also ==
- Egyptian, Coptic, and Islamic calendars
