= Pope Theodosius I of Alexandria =

Head of the Coptic Church from 535 to 566

Saint Theodosius I of Alexandria
- Pope of Alexandria & Patriarch of the See of St. Mark
- Papacy began: 535
- Papacy ended: 22 June 566
- Predecessor: Timothy III
- Successor: Paul/Peter IV

Personal details
- Born: Egypt
- Died: 22 June 566 Egypt
- Buried: Saint Mark's Church
- Denomination: Coptic Orthodox Christian
- Residence: Saint Mark's Church

Sainthood
- Feast day: 22 June (28 Paoni in the Coptic calendar)

Pope Theodosius I of Alexandria (died June 22, 566) was the last Patriarch of Alexandria recognised by both the Coptic Orthodox Christians and the Chalcedonian Melchites.

After the death of Timothy III (IV), in 535, Gaianus took patriarchal post for three months until the emperor Justinian removed him and replaced him with Theodosius.

As successor to Pope Timothy III (IV), at the request of the Arab king Al-Harith ibn Jabalah al-Ghassani and Empress Theodora's efforts, Jacob Baradaeus ordained a universal bishop in 543/4 AD by Mor Theodosius. He was at first recognized by the Emperor Justinian I and the Eastern Orthodox Church. However, because of his Miaphysite theology, he was rejected by the Eastern Orthodox Church of Alexandria and exiled by the Emperor Justinian I in 536. In his place, Paul was elected Patriarch.

The community of Miaphysite exiles in Constantinople continued to support Theodosius.

As the Copts continued to recognise Theodosius, the lineage between the Coptic and Melchite split. This split endures until today.

Theodosius spent the last 28 years of his life exiled from Alexandria. He spent some time in Upper Egypt and after his death the Coptic Church elected Peter IV as his successor.

Theodosius’s writings include the ‘Tome to Theodora’ and the ‘Letter to the Armenians’; several of his letters are held in the British Library.

Theodosius is commemorated in the Coptic Synaxarion on the 28th day of Ba'unah (June 5), the day of his death.

Religious titles
Preceded by Timothy III (IV)	Patriarch of Alexandria; 535–536	Succeeded by Paul I
Preceded by Timothy III (IV)	Coptic Pope; 535–567	Succeeded by Peter IV
