= Pope Alexander II of Alexandria =

Head of the Coptic Church from 704 to 729

Saint Alexander II of Alexandria
- Pope of Alexandria & Patriarch of the See of St. Mark
- Papacy began: 704
- Papacy ended: 14 February 729
- Predecessor: Simeon I
- Successor: Cosmas I

Personal details
- Born: Bana, Egypt
- Died: 14 February 729 Egypt
- Buried: Saint Mark's Church
- Denomination: Coptic Orthodox Christian
- Residence: Saint Mark's Church

Sainthood
- Feast day: 14 February (7 Amshir in the Coptic calendar)

Pope Alexander II of Alexandria (Coptic: ⲁⲗⲉⲝⲁⲛⲇⲣⲟⲥ; died 14 February 729) was the 43rd Pope of Alexandria and Patriarch of the See of St. Mark.

He presided over his church during an era of great hardship and oppression.

== Consecration ==
There is little information available on Alexander's early life as a layman prior to becoming a monk at the monastery of the Enaton west of Alexandria. However, at the Enaton he became well known for his chastity, sanctity, and religious scholarship. Upon the death of Simeon of Alexandria in 701, the Patriarchate of Alexdandria remained vacant for approximately four years, while the members of the church sought an appropriate successor. The lack of a patriarch, though, created economic problems for the church, so the secretary of state, or mutawallī al-diwān in Alexandria, a Copt named Athanasius, asked the governor to allow the bishop of al-Qays, Anbā Gregorius, to assume authority over the church's finances until a new patriarch would be elected. The governor, Abd al-Malik agreed, which allowed the selection of a patriarch to take top priority. Athanasius gathered together all the Coptic scribes, clergy, and bishops, and the group unanimously selected Alexander based on his sterling reputation. Alexander was then taken to Alexandria to be consecrated.

== Patriarchate ==
Alexander's patriarchate occurred under several Umayyad caliphs, whose positions on the Copts varied greatly. These included Abd al-Malik, Al-Walid I, Sulayman ibn Abd al-Malik, Umar II, Yazid II, and Hisham ibn Abd al-Malik. This period included the Siege of Constantinople, which had a serious economic impact on the economy of Egypt. The failure at Constantinople, coupled with the financial strains brought about by the Al-Zubayr rebellion, made the Caliphs look to Egypt as the closest source of funds from which to prop themselves up economically.

=== Political problems ===
The confiscatory taxing started when Abd al-Malik chose to name his son Al-Walid I as his successor. Al-Walid constantly demanded revenues from the Egyptian people. He also employed a native Copt named Benjamin who assisted him in locating where the people had hidden their wealth, which would then be confiscated by the government. He also raised the jizya well beyond any normal rates, and, for the first time in history, imposed it on the monks as well. He also imposed an additional tax of 2000 dinars above the normal rate of kharaj taxation on every bishop. The extreme financial pressures these taxes imposed on the Copts caused many to convert to Islam to escape them. These feigned converts included such figures as Buṭrus, the viceroy of Upper Egypt, Buṭrus' brother Theodosius, and son Theophanes, the governor of Mareotis.

Al-Walid did not limit himself to taxing the Copts' finances; he also taxed their patience. He publicly reviled Jesus and once, during a procession, he even spat in the face of an image of the Virgin Mary. When the Copts protested to the Caliph about the level of taxation he responded with more seizure of property and higher taxes. Such behavior continued under Al-Walid's successors. He went so far as to seize gold and silver utensils used in church services, and even several pillars and carved wood sculptures, from the churches, and use them for profane purposes.

=== Branding ===
Things improved, if only financially, for Alexander and the Copts under Umar II, but the accession of Yazid II after him made things even worse than they had been under Al-Walid. Yazid not only reinstated all the earlier taxes, he also ordered the destruction of all crosses and sacred images in churches. He also ordered all his subjects to wear a leaden identification badge around their necks, and required that all Copts who wished to engage in business activity have the mark of a lion branded on their hands. Anyone caught without the mark would have his hand cut off. This ongoing and escalating abuse of the people by their government instilled a rebellious mood in the Copts, and several local revolts broke out against the government.

When the government decided that Alexander, as patriarch, must submit to being branded with the lion as well, he protested and asked that he be allowed to plead his case before the viceroy himself. Alexander was taken to Fustat with a special military bodyguard. However, when he arrived at the capital, the viceroy refused to see him, and Alexander was forced to remain in Fustat.

== Death ==
While in Fustat his health declined. With the help of Anbā Shamūl, the bishop of Awsim, Alexander determined to escape and return to Alexandria by ship. On reaching Tarnūt, with the governor's soldiers in pursuit, Alexander died. When they found the dead patriarch the soldiers seized Anbā Shamūl and took him back to Fustat, where he was found complicit in Alexander's escape and fined 1000 dinars. With the assistance of the Copts, who raised 300 dinars for him, he was able to raise the money and be released.

Alexander's body was taken back to Alexandria, where he was buried with the profound grief of his people.

== Veneration ==
Alexander is regarded as a saint by the Coptic Church, and also has a feast day on February 1 in the Ethiopian Orthodox Tewahedo Church.

Preceded by Simeon I	Coptic Pope; 702–729	Succeeded by Cosmas I
