= Saint Mark's Coptic Orthodox Cathedral (Alexandria) =

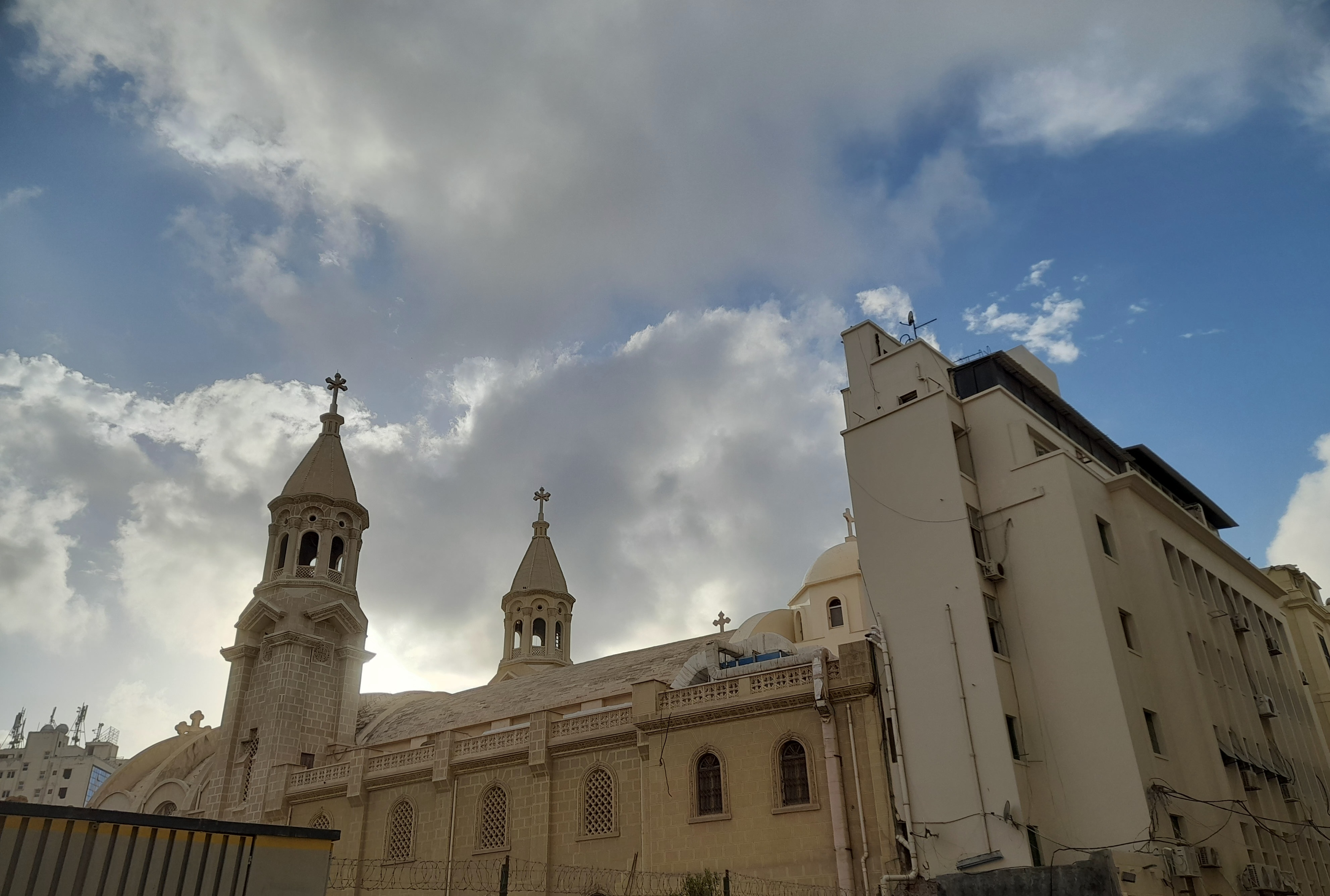
- An exterior view of St. Mark's Cathedral in Alexandria
- Saint Mark's Coptic Orthodox Cathedral
- 31.198290°N 29.899403°E
- Location: St. Mark's Coptic Cathedral, Mahatet el-Raml, Alexandria
- Country: Egypt
- Denomination: Coptic Orthodox Church of Alexandria

History
- Founder: Saint Mark (traditional)
- Dedication: Saint Mark

Architecture
- Architectural type: church
- Style: Coptic

Clergy
- Bishop: Pope Tawadros II of Alexandria
- Priests: Fr. Ibrahim Nawar; Fr. Marcos Gabra; Fr. Abraam Emile; Fr. Kirollos Fathy; Fr. Makarios Wahib

Saint Mark's Coptic Orthodox Cathedral is a Coptic church in Alexandria, Egypt. It is the historical seat of the Pope of Alexandria, the head of the Coptic Orthodox Church.

== Overview ==
Believed to stand on the site of a church founded in AD 67/68 by Mark the Evangelist in Baucalis, in AD 311 a chapel was recorded here, containing bodies said to be of Mark and his successors. Enlarged in the days of Pope Achillas, the church was ruined in 641 when the Arabs invaded Egypt, but was rebuilt in 680 by Pope John III of Alexandria. In 828, most of the body of Saint Mark was stolen and removed to Venice, with only the head remaining in Alexandria; a portion of the body was returned in 1968.

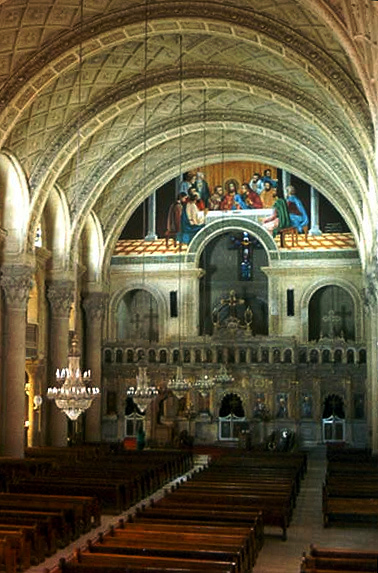
An interior view

The church was destroyed again in 1219, during the crusades, then rebuilt again. It was pulled down during the French invasion of Alexandria in 1798, then rebuilt and reopened in 1819 by Pope Peter VII of Alexandria and restored in the 1870s.

Between 1950 and 1952, the church was again pulled down, apart from its two bell towers, and replaced by a larger building of reinforced concrete, with six marble pillars retained as part of the new portico, and with the icon carrier reinstated. The two bell towers were reinforced with concrete and decorated with beautiful Coptic engravings.

Between 1985 and 1990, the church was doubled in size by being widened.

== Relics of St. Mark ==
The present St. Mark's Coptic Cathedral is of recent date, but is said to stand on the site of the church founded by St. Mark himself. St. Mark the Evangelist (author of the second Gospel) has been connected with the city of Alexandria since earliest Christian tradition. Coptic Christians believe he arrived in Alexandria around AD 42 and stayed for about seven years.

In 828, relics believed to be the body of St. Mark were stolen from Alexandria by Venetian merchants and taken to Venice. Copts believe that the head of St. Mark remains in the church in Alexandria, and parts of his relics are in St. Mark's Cathedral in Alexandria. The rest of what are believed to be his relics are in the St Mark's Basilica in Venice, Italy. Every year, on the 30th day of the month of Paopi, the Coptic Orthodox Church celebrates the commemoration of the consecration of the Cathedral of St. Mark, and displays the purported head of the saint at the cathedral.

== History ==
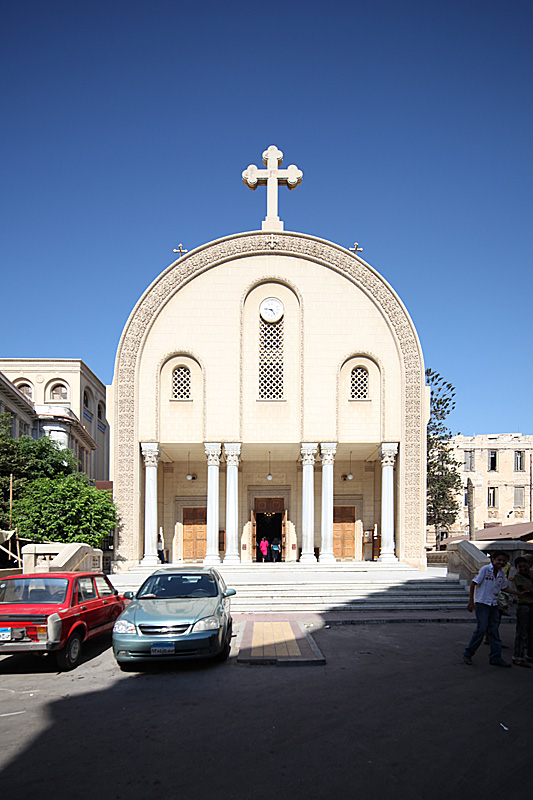
Facade of the cathedral.

In AD 311, before the martyrdom of Pope Peter the Last of Martyrs, he prayed a last prayer on the grave of Saint Mark, the church was then a little chapel on the eastern coast, and it contained bodies said to be of Saint Mark and some of his holy successors. The church was later enlarged in the days of Pope Achillas, the 18th Pope.

The church was greatly ruined in 641 when the Arabs invaded Egypt. In 680 Pope John III rebuilt the church. In 828, the body of Saint Mark was stolen by Italian sailors and was taken from Alexandria to Venice in Italy. However, Saint Mark's head remained in Alexandria.

The church was destroyed again in 1219, during the time of the crusades, then it was rebuilt once more. Sixteenth-century French explorer Pierre Belon mentions the founding of the church in 1547.

The church was pulled down during the French invasion of Alexandria in July 1798. The church was rebuilt and opened in 1819 by Pope Peter El Gawly in the time of Mohammed Ali Pasha. The church was renewed in the time of Pope Demetrius II and by the supervision of Bishop Marcos of El Behira in 1870. Between the years 1950–1952, in the time of Pope Yusab II, the church building was pulled down and another, larger building was built with reinforced concrete after the basilique style. The six marble pillars were transferred into the outer entrance of the church. The icon carrier was accurately cut into parts, each part given a number, and then it was cautiously returned to where it was originally. The two bell tower were not pulled down as they were reinforced with concrete and were decorated with beautiful Coptic engravings. Two new bells – brought from Italy – were provided, one for each bell tower.

Between 1985 and 1990, the church was widened from the western side after the former style with great accuracy, keeping the two bell tower in their places, so the entire area of the church was doubled. The six pillars were transferred to the new western entrance of the church supervised by Pope Shenouda III.

On Palm Sunday, 9 April 2017, as part of the Palm Sunday church bombings, an Islamic State suicide bomber detonated a bomb in the cathedral, killing himself and 17 other people and wounding 48.

== See also ==
- List of Coptic Orthodox churches in Egypt
  - Saint Mark's Coptic Orthodox Cathedral (Azbakeya)
  - Saint Mark's Coptic Orthodox Cathedral (Cairo)
