= Pope of the Coptic Orthodox Church =

Leader of the Coptic Orthodox Church of Alexandria, Egypt

Patriarch of Alexandria Ⲡⲁⲡⲁ ⲛ̀ⲁⲗⲉⲝⲁⲛⲇⲣⲓⲁ ⲛ̀ⲣⲉⲙⲛ̀ⲕⲏⲙⲉ بابا الإسكندرية وبطريرك الكرازة المرقسية Pope

Coptic Orthodox Church
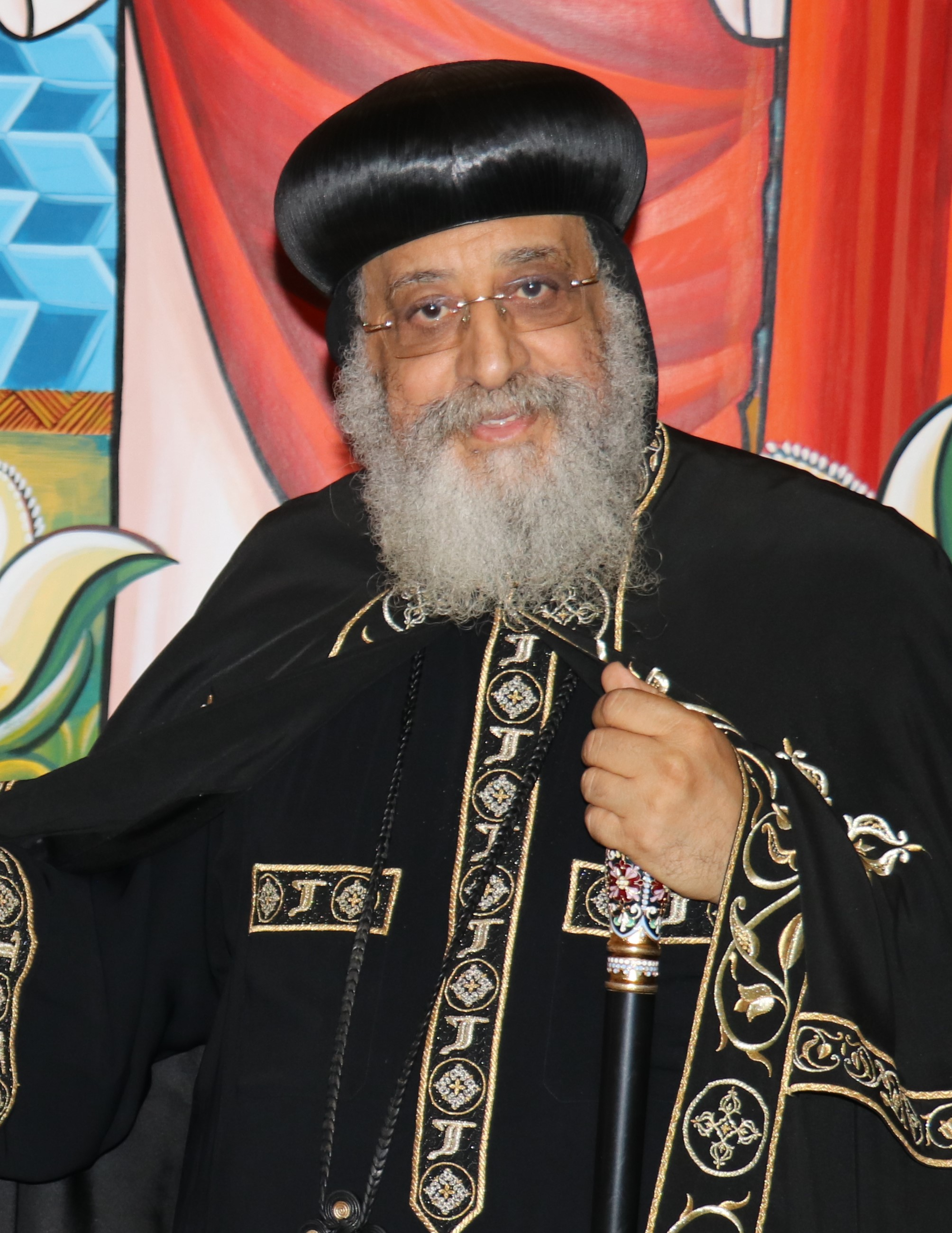
- Tawadros II

- Emblem of the see of St. Mark
- Incumbent; Tawadros II selected 18 November 2012

Location
- Country: Egypt
- Ecclesiastical province: Alexandria, Egypt, Pentapolis, Libya, Nubia, Sudan and all Africa

Information
- Denomination: Oriental Orthodox
- Rite: Alexandrian rite
- Cathedral: Saint Mark Cathedral in Alexandria; Saint Mark Cathedral in Cairo

Website
- https://copticorthodox.church/en/popes/pope-tawadros-ii

The pope (Coptic: Ⲡⲁⲡⲁ, romanized: Papa; Arabic: البابا, romanized: al-Bābā, lit. 'father'), officially the pope of Alexandria and the patriarch of the see of St. Mark, also known as the bishop of Alexandria, or the patriarch of Alexandria, is the leader of the Coptic Orthodox Church, with ancient Christian roots in Egypt. The primacy of the patriarch of Alexandria is rooted in his role as successor to Saint Mark, who was consecrated by Saint Peter, as affirmed by the Council of Nicaea. It is one of three Petrine sees affirmed by the council alongside the Patriarch of Antioch and the Pope of Rome. The current holder of this position is Pope Tawadros II, who was selected as the 118th pope on November 18, 2012.

Following the traditions of the church, the pope is chairman and head of the Holy Synod of the Coptic Orthodox Patriarchate of Alexandria. The holy synod is the highest authority in the Church of Alexandria, which has between 12 and 18 million members worldwide, 10 to 14 million of whom are in Egypt. The pope is also the chairman of the General Congregation Council.

Although historically associated with the city of Alexandria, the residence and Seat of the Coptic Orthodox Pope of Alexandria has been located in Cairo since 1047. The pope is currently established in Saint Mark's Coptic Orthodox Cathedral, inside a compound which includes the Patriarchal Palace, with an additional residence at the Monastery of Saint Pishoy.

The most recent liturgy of the altar ballot took place on November 4, 2012. The 60-year-old Bishop Tawadoros, auxiliary bishop of Beheira, assistant to Metropolitan Pachomius of Beheira, was chosen as the 118th pope of Alexandria. He then chose his own name of Tawadros (Theodoros or Theodore) as his papal name. He was formally enthroned on November 18, 2012.

== History ==
The early Christian Church recognized the special significance of several cities as leaders of the worldwide Christian Church. The Church of Alexandria is one of these original patriarchates, but the succession to the role of patriarch in Alexandria is still disputed after the separation which followed the Council of Chalcedon.

The later development of the pentarchy also granted secular recognition to these religious leaders. Because of this split, the leadership of this church is not part of this system.

Members of the Coptic Orthodox Church consider their heads as direct successors of Mark the Evangelist, as they consider Mark the first bishop of Alexandria and the founder of the church in the 1st century.

== Election ==
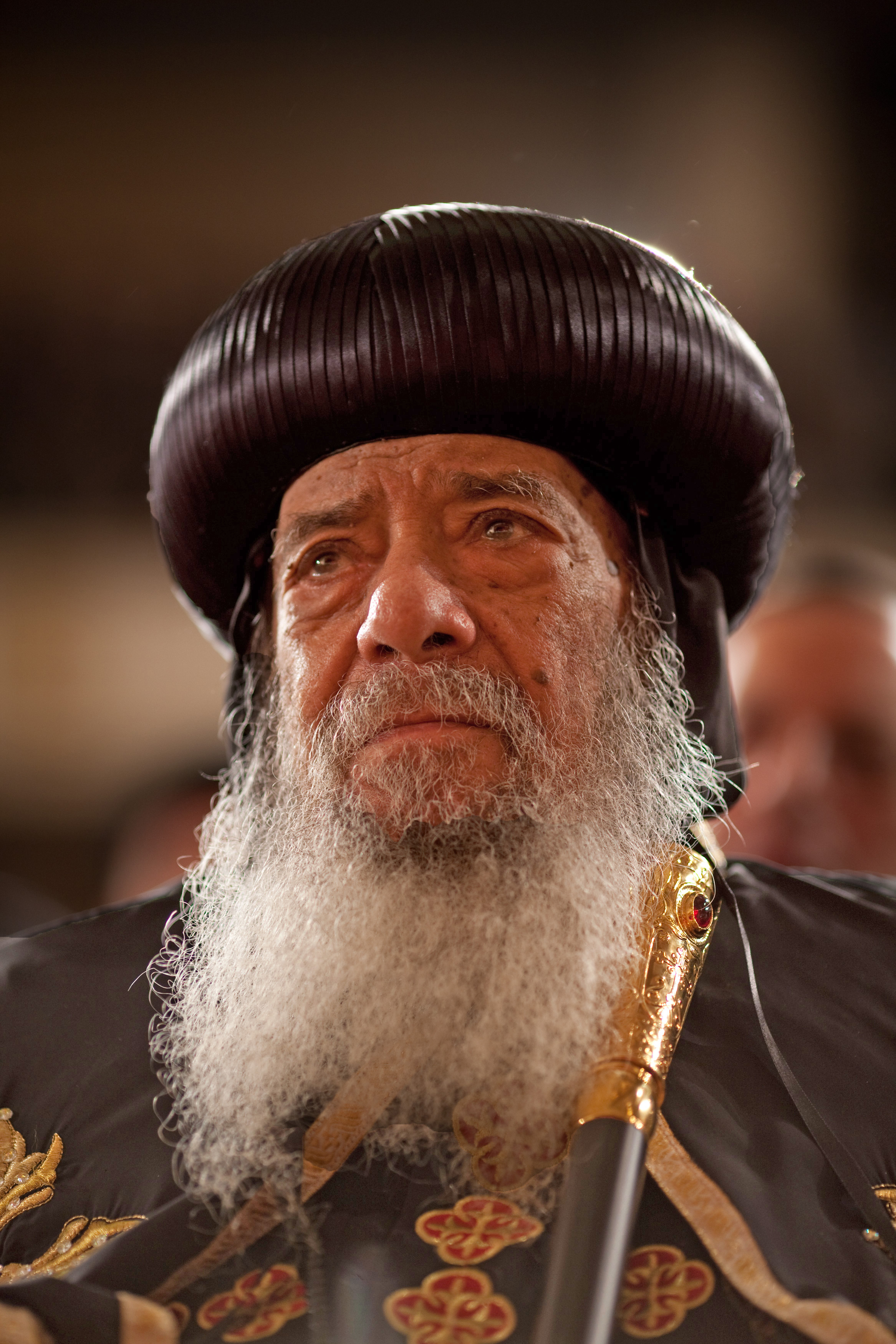
Pope Shenouda III, the 117th Pope of Alexandria

The pope of the Coptic Orthodox Church is elected with the following procedure since 1957:

The first step – which must take place within seven days after the death of the Coptic Pope – is the appointment of a regent, or locum tenens, chosen by the Holy Synod (the assembly of Coptic bishops) to lead the Church until it chooses a successor. Usually it is one of the eldest of the bishops. Under his leadership, within the space of a month, a committee consisting of fourteen members of the Synod, has the task of preparing, based on reports received, an initial list of five or six candidates for the election. There are specific criteria that need to be met: the future Coptic Pope must be over 40 years old, he must have lived as a monk for at least fifteen years, and must never have been married.
Once chosen, this list is then published in Egypt's three major Arab-language newspapers, communicating the names of the candidates to all the faithful of the Coptic Church. For this reason, the next step takes place only after three months. At that point a grand assembly is called, including the 74 bishops of the Coptic Church and twelve representatives from each diocese, chosen from elders and leaders of associations. This is a large body, consisting of one thousand people who will be voting for the candidates. The three that receive the most support will have their names on the ballot during the ceremony of the "sacred election by lot." The ceremony is held during a public ritual which the entire community of the faithful is invited to attend.

Then, during the ceremony, a blindfolded child pulls one of three cards from within a chalice, each with the name of a different candidate written on it, out of a silver urn. The name on the card picked by the child will be the identity of the person chosen to be the new pope.

After the death of Shenouda III on March 17, 2012 the Holy Synod of the Coptic Orthodox Church voted on a successor. The names of the three candidates who received most votes were put in a glass chalice. One name was then picked by a blindfolded boy, believed to be guided by the hand of God. Tawadros II thus became the new patriarch of Alexandria. Shenouda III had been elected in a similar fashion.

== Historical evolution of the ecclesiastical title ==
=== Pope ===
The word pope derives from Greek πάππας meaning "father".

A record in history of the term "Pope" is assigned to Pope Heraclas of Alexandria in a letter written by the bishop of Rome, Dionysius, to Philemon:

τοῦτον ἐγὼ τὸν κανόνα καὶ τὸν τύπον παρὰ τοῦ μακαρίου πάπα ἡμῶν Ἡρακλᾶ παρέλαβον.

which translates into:

I received this rule and ordinance from our blessed pope, Heraclas.

It is difficult to ascertain the identity of the first Bishop of Rome to carry the title Pope of Rome. Some sources suggest that it was Pope Marcellinus (died 304 AD).

From the 6th century, the imperial chancery of Constantinople normally reserved this designation for the Bishop of Rome. From the early 6th century, it began to be confined in the West to the Bishop of Rome, a practice that was in place by the 11th century, when Pope Gregory VII declared it reserved for the Bishop of Rome.

== See also ==
- Coptic Orthodox Church
- List of Coptic Orthodox popes
- Holy Synod of the Coptic Orthodox Church
- Seat of the Coptic Orthodox Pope of Alexandria
- Patriarch of Alexandria
