= Battle of Dongola =

The Battle of Dongola may refer to one of a series of military conflicts including:

- The First Battle of Dongola between the Kingdom of Makuria and the Rashidun Caliphate led by Commander Uqbah ibn Nafae in 642.
- The Second Battle of Dongola between the Kingdom of Makuria under King Qaladurut and the Rashidun Caliphate led by Commander Abdullah ibn Sa'ad in 652.
- Battle of Dongola (1276)
