= Qalidurut =

- King of Makuria
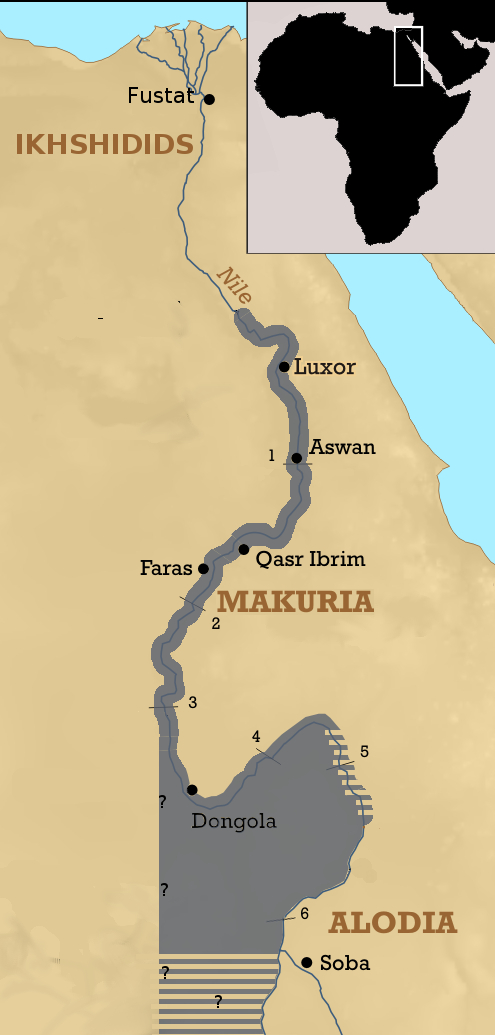
- Successor: Zacharias
- Born: Old Dongola
- Religion: Nubian Christianity

Qalidurut (Arabic: ﻗﺎﻟﻴﺪوروت, Qalīdurūt) was a Christian king of Makuria in Nubia during the 7th century. Arab sources acknowledge his victories over the Rashidun Caliphate during the First and Second Battles of Dongola and attribute the Baqt—often credited as the longest-lasting treaty in history—to his subsequent peace negotiations.

== Life ==
Very little is known about Qalidurut, nearly all from Arab sources. His name is not attested in known Greek, Coptic, or Old Nubian records or inscriptions.

The Nubians had converted to a form of Byzantine Christianity in the 6th century, with a Coptic cathedral established at their capital Old Dongola by 570. They repulsed the Rashidun Caliphate's initial invasion in the summer of 642 in a guerilla campaign collectively known as the First Battle of Dongola. Their king Qalidurut was then credited with having withstood Abd Allah ibn Sa'd's siege of his capital in AH 31 (651/652). Centuries later, he was said to have then negotiated the Baqt, which by this reckoning was observed for the next 520 years. He was succeeded as ruler by his son Zacharias.

Modern excavations at Old Dongola have established that, during this period, the original cathedral at Dongola was destroyed and its pink granite subsequently used to strengthen the town's fortifications and raise a huge tower overlooking the Nile valley. A new cathedral was erected as a five-aisled domed basilica, its presbytery decorated with a geometric mosaic, and a smaller domed cruciform building erected beside the royal palace, apparently a commemoration of the city's defenders with murals of Nubian soldiers in Paradise. The town prospered, extending at least a kilometer (⅔ mile) with well-built two-story residences and with surviving wine amphorae attesting to trade as far as Syria and to the expansion of local viniculture.

== See also ==
- Makuria
- List of rulers of Makuria
