= Old Dongola =

Sudanese human settlement

- دنقلا العجوز (Arabic)
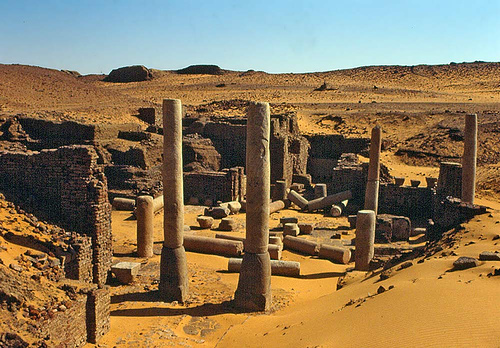
- Church of the Granite Columns in Old Dongola

- Location within Sudan
- 18°13′23″N 30°44′38″E
- Type: Settlement
- Location: Northern State, Sudan
- Region: Nubia

Site notes
- Condition: In ruins

Old Dongola (Old Nubian: ⲧⲩⲛⲅⲩⲗ, Tungul; Arabic: دنقلا العجوز, Dunqulā al-ʿAjūz) is a deserted Nubian town in what is now Northern State, Sudan, located on the east bank of the Nile opposite the Wadi Howar. An important city in medieval Nubia, and the departure point for caravans west to Darfur and Kordofan, from the 4th to the 14th century, Old Dongola was the capital of the Makurian state. A Polish archaeological team has been excavating the town since 1964.

The urban centre moved downstream 80 km (50 miles) to the opposite side of the Nile during the 19th century, becoming the modern Dongola.

== History ==
=== Foundation and heyday ===
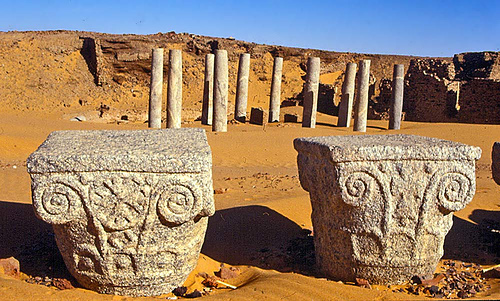
The Church of the Granite Columns

The archaeological site encompassing Old Dongola has about 200 ha. Its southern part features a citadel and urban buildings, while the north has yielded splendid suburban residences. Cemeteries associated with later phases of the town's development also include Islamic domed tombs.

Old Dongola was founded in the 5th century as a fortress. On top of the citadel, which was itself the royal residence, numerous palaces and public buildings stood. In the mid-6th century, with the arrival of Christianity, it became Makuria's capital. The town expanded further, including the area outside the citadel. Several churches were built. These include, to use the names contemporary archaeologists have given them, Building X and the Church with the Stone Pavement. These two structures were erected about 100 meters from the walled town centre, indicating that the town had already extended beyond the fortress walls. Building X was soon replaced by the Old Church.

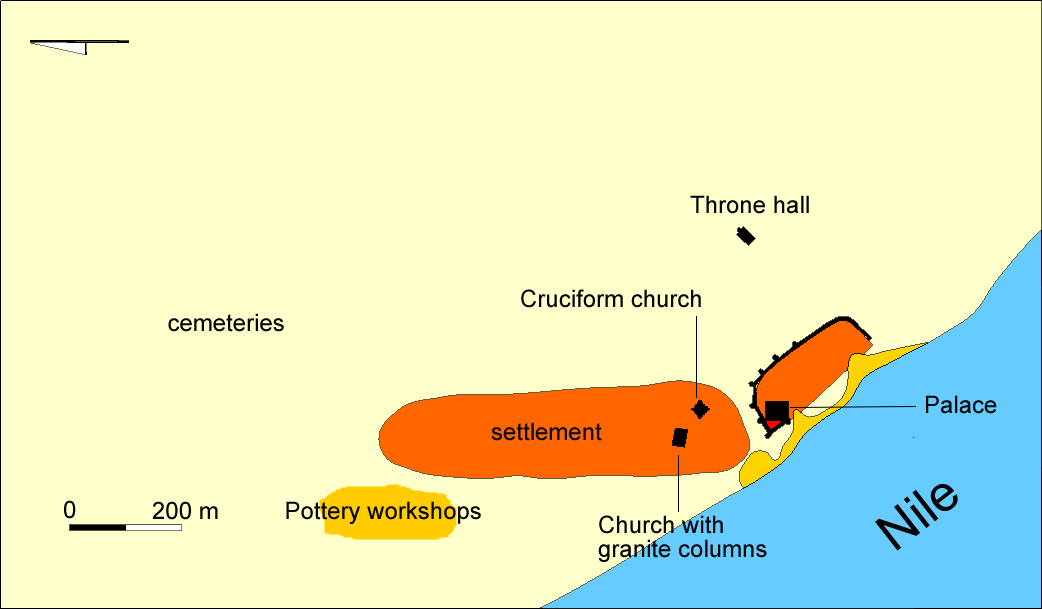
Plan of Old Dongola in the Medieval Period

In the mid-7th century, the two main churches were destroyed but rebuilt soon after. Builders took material from the Old Church and used it to repair the city walls. Archaeologists believe this destruction is evidence of the First (642) and Second Battle of Dongola (652).

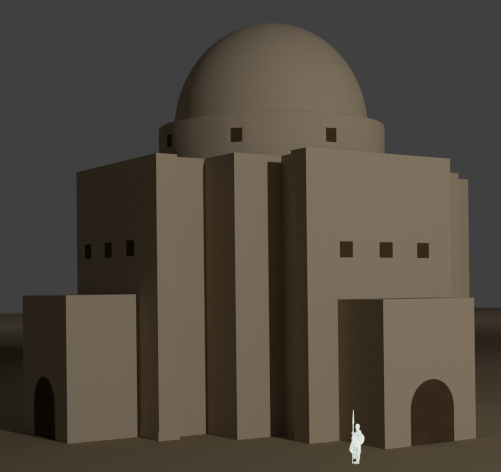
Reconstruction of the Cruciform Church

At the end of the 7th Century, the Church of the Granite Columns was erected over the Old Church. Adorned with 16 granite columns, each with richly decorated granite capitals, the Church of the Granite Columns perhaps was the cathedral of Old Dongola.

The city's heyday was in the 9th–11th centuries, but building activity lasted until the 14th century. The Church of the Stone Pavements was replaced with the Cruciform Church at this time. Other buildings in use in Old Dongola at this time include many other churches, at least two palaces, and a sizable monastery on its north side. Several houses were well equipped and had bath rooms and wall paintings.

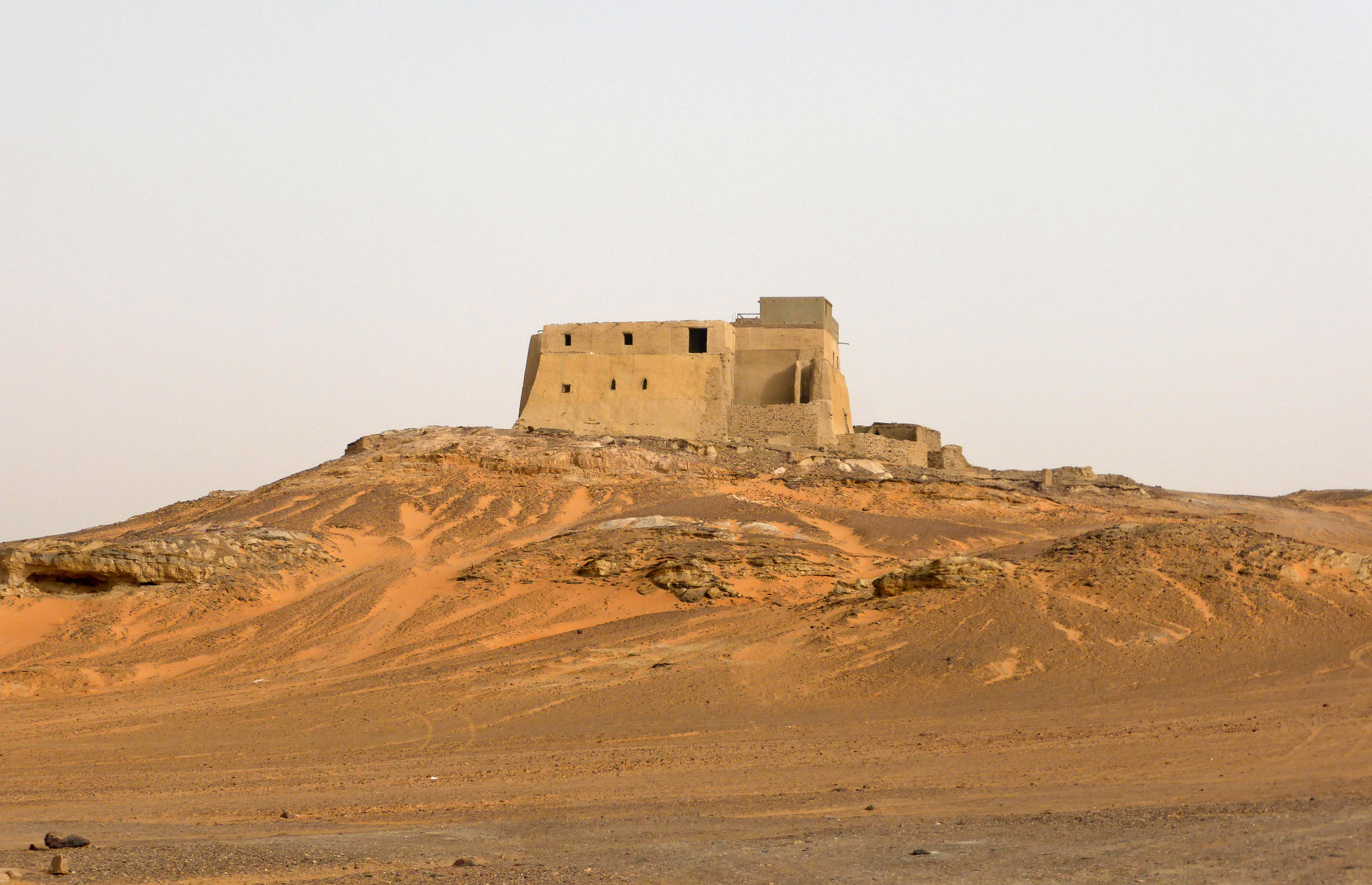
The Throne Hall building

The Book of Knowledge, a travelogue compiled by a Spanish monk soon after 1348, mentions that Genoese merchants had settled in Old Dongola; they may have penetrated there as a consequence of the commercial treaty of 1290 between Genoa and Egypt.

=== The Great Monastery of St Anthony ===
About 1.5 km to the north-east of the citadel lies the so-called Kom H, where the monastery was uncovered. According to the inscription, it is dedicated to St Anthony the Great, but literature also refers to a Monastery of the Holy Trinity. It was probably one of the first Christian building projects in Dongola. Archbishop of Dongola, Georgios, who died in 1113, was buried in one of the crypts in the church. The inscription on his funerary stela indicates that St Anthony the Great was the patron of the monastery. In the rich assemblage of texts in Greek, Coptic, and Old Nubian found in the archbishop's crypt, a dedication to the Holy Trinity also appears.

Approximately 100 compositions, dated to the 11th–13th centuries, were uncovered on the walls of the monastery buildings. Many of these paintings are unique, both from the artistic and iconographical point of view. They depicted Christ, Mary, the Apostles, scenes from the Old and New Testament, as well as dignitaries.

=== The Throne Hall ===
The monumental representative building, interpreted as the Throne Hall of the Makurian kings, is a massive, defence-like building measuring 28 m by 18 m by 12 m, situated on a rocky spur east of the fortress. It was built in the 9th century. The building had two stories; the height of the walls was 6.5 m on the ground floor and 3.5 m on the upper floor. In 1317 it was turned into a mosque, an event which is preserved in a foundation stela erected by Sayf al-Din Abdullah Barshambu. The ceremonial Throne Hall on the first floor was turned into a prayer room. The mosque remained in use until 1969, when the building was converted into a historic monument.

=== Decline ===
During the 13th and 14th centuries, the town declined. Mamluks attacked it several times. A surviving inscription erected in Old Dongola bears the date of 1317 and is commonly understood to be the record of a military expedition sent by the Sultan of Egypt to place his nominee Abdullah, perhaps a Muslim Nubian, on the throne. The royal court left Dongola in 1364.

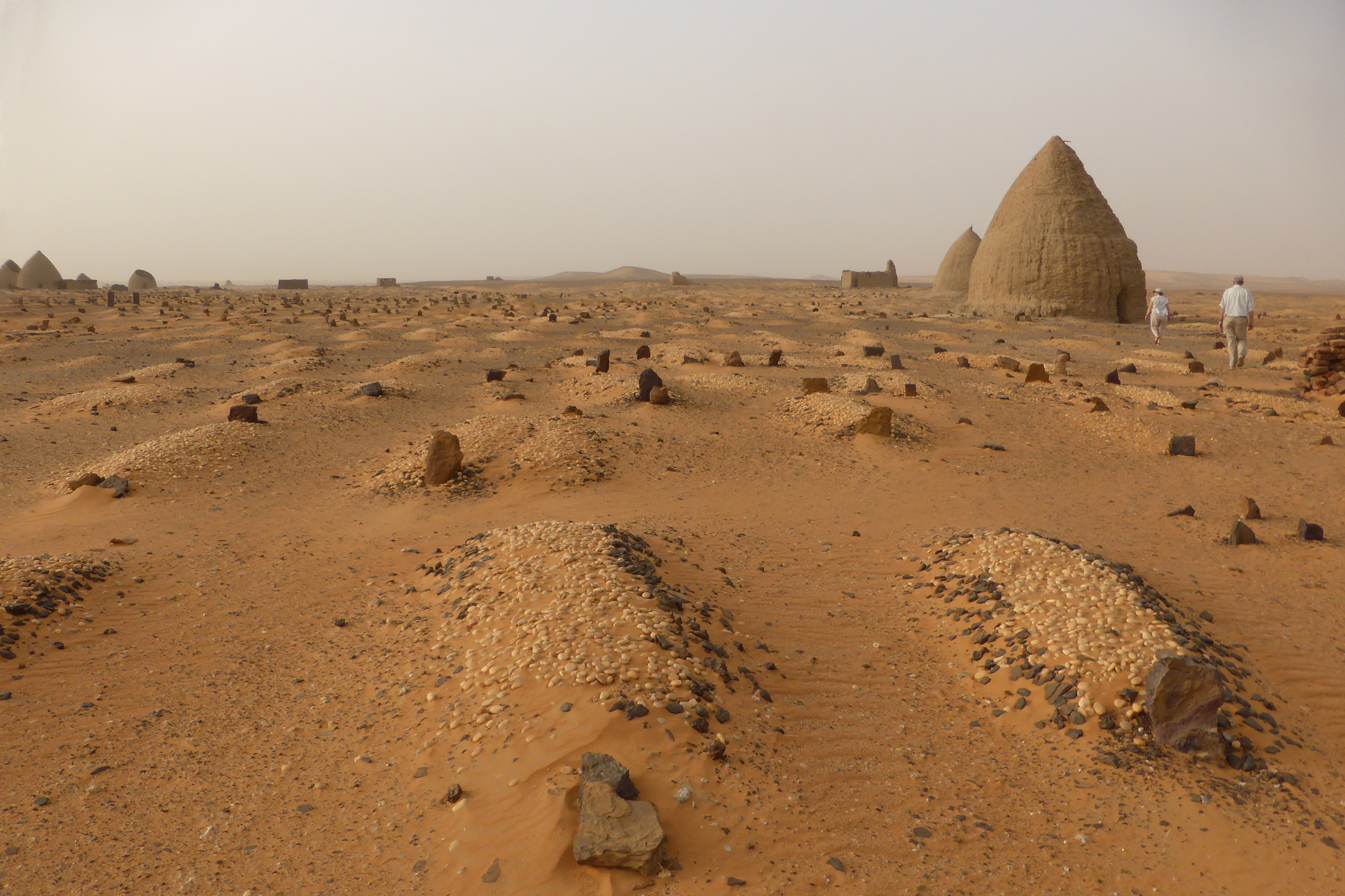
The Islamic cemetery with qubbas

Under the Funj, Old Dongola became the capital of the Northern provinces. The hereditary local ruler was known as the Mekk in the local Nubian dialect, and was subordinate to the Funj Sultan in Sennar. While a tributary of the Sultan, the ruler of Dongola was allowed to exercise local control, and even used the Arabic title of Malik, that is, king. The area around Dongola was gradually Arabized and Islamized over centuries after the fall of the last Christian rulers.

A Mekk named Qashqash or Kashkash ruled Dongola around the turn of the 17th Century. Once thought to be semi-legendary, a letter unearthed at Dongola between 2019 and 2021 and published in 2026 shows that Qashqash was a historical ruler. According to Kitāb al-Ṭabaqāt fī Khuṣūṣ al-Awliyāʾ wa-l-Ṣāliḥīn wa-l-ʿUlamāʾ wa-l-Shuʿarāʾ fī al-Sūdān ("The Book of Generations concerning the Saints, the Righteous, the Scholars, and the Poets in Sudan"), a tabaqat biography from the early 19th Century, Qashqash was succeeded by his son, Hasan.

The French traveller Charles-Jacques Poncet visited the city in 1699 and, in his memoirs, described it as located on the slope of a sandy hill. His description of Old Dongola continues:

The houses are ill built, and the streets half deserted and fill'd with heaps of sand, occasion'd by floods from the mountains. The castle is in the very centre of the town. It is large and spacious, but the fortifications are inconsiderable. It keeps in awe the Arabians, who are masters of the open country.

Intensive trade relations with the Far East and Europe continued during this period. However, trade declined after the rise of the Shaigiya Confederacy. In 1812, the Mamluks fled to Sudan to escape purges in Egypt and conquered Old Dongola. They founded the city of New Dongola downriver, which grew in size, shifting the economic and trade centre of the region away from Old Dongola.

=== Islamic cemetery ===
A large Islamic cemetery with numerous qubbas, erected in the 17th century, also testifies to Old Dongola's importance in postmedieval times.

== Polish archaeological expedition to Old Dongola ==
Polish archaeological and conservation work in Dongola began with Kazimierz Michałowski. The Polish Centre of Mediterranean Archaeology University of Warsaw has conducted research at the site since 1964, with the support of the Sudanese National Corporation for Antiquities and Museums. Architect Antoni Ostrasz was the expedition's first head. Later, Stefan Jakobielski and Włodzimierz Godlewski directed the works for 60 years. Since 2017, the "UMMA: Urban Metamorphosis of the community of a Medieval African capital city" project (ERC Starting Grant), headed by Artur Obłuski, has been active in studies of the youngest layers of the site.

In May 2021, archaeologists led by Obłuski announced the discovery of a new church's apse decorated with paintings describing two rows of colossal figures, as well as an attached wall and the nearby dome of a large tomb in Old Dongola, which might have been a cathedral and the largest known church from medieval Nubia. Obłuski reported:

The apse is about 9 meters deep. This means that the eastern part of the building has been preserved to the impressive height of three floors of a typical block of flats. And this gives a great chance that there are more paintings and inscriptions under our feet, just like in Faras.

In February 2023, the Polish Centre of Mediterranean Archaeology headed by Obłuski announced the discovery of Ancient Egyptian hieroglyphs inscribed on stone blocks and figural decorations as elements from a Pharaonic temple. Further, the Polish archaeologists discovered various unusual wall paintings probably from the 13th century. One of these paintings is a portrait of the Virgin Mary, and another depicts a scene with the archangel Michael and a Nubian king. Holding the king in his arms, the archangel presents him to Jesus sitting on a cloud and extending a hand for the king to kiss. “This is completely uncommon for Byzantine Christian art, which generally does not show a lot of interaction or contact between mortals and immortals,” said team leader Artur Obłuski.

In 2026 a joint team from the Polish Centre of Mediterranean Archaeology and Sudan's National Corporation for Antiquities and Museums uncovered a section of the original floor of the cathedral, known as the Great Church of Jesus, for the first time, along with the base of a large staircase.

== See also ==
- 2021 in archaeology
