= Baqt =

7th-century treaty between Makuria and Egypt

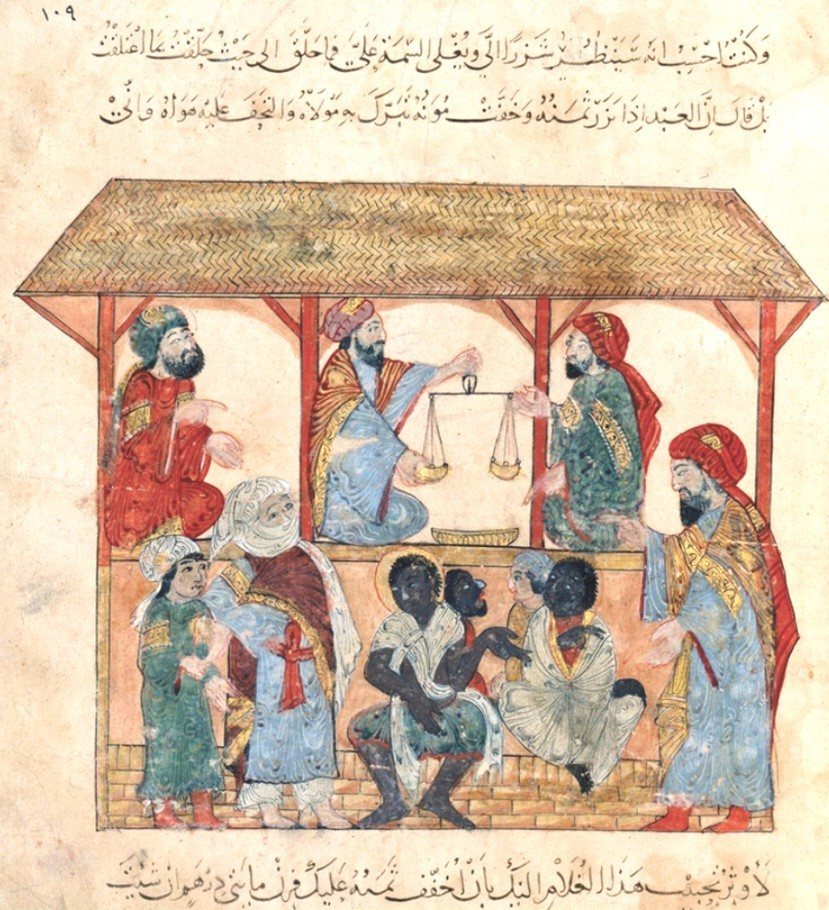
A 13th-century book illustration produced in Baghdad by al-Wasiti showing a slave-market in the town of Zabid in Yemen

The Baqṭ (Arabic: بقط, baqṭ) was a treaty between the Nubian Christian state of Makuria and the new Muslim rulers of Egypt in the 7th century. Said to have lasted almost seven hundred years, it is by some measures the longest-lasting treaty in history.

== Name ==
The Arab name derives from either a Coptic language term for barter or the Byzantine Greek word paktos (πακτος), meaning pact. The History of the Patriarchs of Alexandria traditionally ascribed to Severus of Hermopolis includes a passage under its account of the pontificate of Benjamin I that describes the 3 years of payments made by the Byzantine emperor Heraclius to the Rashidun Caliphate as collected through "the tax [called] the bakt, that is to say it was a sum levied at so much a head".

== History ==
Despite its longevity, little is known about the Baqt, and almost all information about it comes from Muslim sources.

The Baqt was established after the Arab conquest of Egypt. In AH 31 (651/652), the Hejazi general Abd Allah ibn Sa'd led an army south against the Christian kingdoms of Nubia: Makuria, Nobatia, and Alodia. Later Islamic historians state that Nubia was not worth conquering, and the expedition was to subordinate the region to Egypt. Earlier sources suggest that the Arab armies suffered a rare defeat at the second battle of Dongola and only acceded to the Baqt when they realized that conquering the region would be difficult. Ecclesiastical histories of the Coptic Church also noted the era of Abd Allah's viceroyalty as marked by extreme famine, to the point of inciting instances of cannibalism. The agreement was negotiated between Abd Allah and the Makurian king, recorded only in its Arabic form as Qalidurut.

=== Provisions ===
There is no extant copy of the treaty they signed, and the earliest copies date to several centuries after and vary significantly. The treaty might not have been written at all, but may have been an oral agreement instead. Some sections of the Baqt are clear:

- Muslims would not attack Nubia, and Nubians would not attack Egypt
- Citizens of the two nations would be allowed to trade and travel between the two states freely and would be guaranteed safe passage while in the other nation
- Immigration to and settlement in the other nation's lands were forbidden
- Fugitives were to be extradited, as were escaped slaves
- Nubians were responsible for maintaining a mosque for Muslim visitors and residents
- Muslims had no obligation to protect the Nubians from attacks by third parties
- The most important provision was that 360 of their slaves per year were to be sent to Egypt in exchange for cargoes of wheat and lentils. These slaves had to be of the highest quality, meaning that the elderly and children were excluded. The slaves sent had to be a mix of male and female. In some reports, an extra forty were due, who were distributed among notables in Egypt. A tribute of 400 slaves was sent annually from Nubia to Egypt from the 7th century to the 14th century.

=== Sources ===
Ibn Abd al-Hakam, one of the first historians to discuss the treaty, gives two different versions of the treaty. The first has only Nubia sending slaves north, thus symbolizing its subservience to Egypt. The second version adds an obligation on the part of the Egyptians to also send goods south, including wheat and lentils, in exchange for the slaves; this would put the two nations on a more equal footing. The second version is more reliable, as it conforms with the Nubian version of the treaty and also aligns with the results of the first and second Battles of Dongola.

=== Context and consequences ===
This treaty was unprecedented in the history of the early Muslim conquests, being more similar to the arrangements the Byzantine Empire sometimes made with its neighbours. It is also unmatched in that it largely blocked the spread of Islam and the Arabs for half a millennium. Spaulding reports that the exchange of goods was a typical diplomatic arrangement in Northeast Africa, and the Nubians would have had long experience with such agreements.

The Baqt caused some controversy among Islamic theologians; there was disagreement over whether it violated the duty to expand the dar al-Islam.

=== History of enforcement ===
The Baqt was not always without controversy, and conflicts between the neighbours were not unheard of.

==== Abbasid period ====
In the 830s, Egypt plunged into turmoil during the Fourth Fitna, and King Zacharias III of Makuria halted payment of the Baqt. When the Abbasid Caliphate gained firm control of Egypt, they demanded resumption of the Baqt and payment of arrears. Unable or unwilling to pay this large sum, Zacharias sent his son and heir Georgios on a long journey to Baghdad in 835 to negotiate directly with the Caliph. This expedition was a great success; the arrears were cancelled, and the Baqt was altered so that it only had to be paid every three years.

==== Fatimid period ====
The closest relations were during the Fatimid Caliphate. The Ismaili Fatimids had few allies in the predominantly Sunni world, and Nubia was an important ally. The slaves sent from Nubia made up the backbone of the Fatimid army.

==== Ayyubid and Mamluk periods ====
Relations were worse under the Ayyubid dynasty and very poor under the Mamluk Sultanate, with full-scale war eventually breaking out. Even after Makuria collapsed in the thirteenth century, the Egyptians continued to insist upon its payment by the Muslim successor kingdoms in the region. The Baqt finally came to an end in the mid-fourteenth century with the complete collapse of organized government in the region.
