= El-Hobagi =

Coordinates: 16.6167°N 33.1667°E

El-Hobagi is an archaeological site in Sudan. It lies approximately 65 kilometres (40 mi) southwest of Meroe on the western side of the Nile, near the sixth cataract.

== Excavation and discoveries at the site ==
Several large tumuli were found at el-Hobagi from the period after the fall of the Meroitic kingdom, but before the Christianization of Nubia. The site, which is dated to the 4th century, is situated near a post-Meroitic cemetery. Grave mounds excavated by a French team revealed an absence of rich gifts, instead containing weapons such as swords, spears, axes, arrows and bows. The dead lay on a bed and were surrounded by numerous vessels. There was also a bronze bowl, which contains one of the last known Meroitic inscriptions; it is decorated with agricultural scenes and the word Qore ("King"). This suggests that local kings were buried here in the wake of the Meroitic kingdom. Some findings suggest that the King's court was moved to the area of el-Hobagi in the 4th century AD, though no village of that era has been found here. Tumulus III at El Hobagi is believed to date to the early Postmeroitic period of the late 4th century.
