= First battle of Dongola =

Battle between Rashidun Caliphate and Kingdom of Makuria in 642

- Part of the Arab conquest of Egypt
Date	Summer, 642
Location	In Northern Nubia
Result	Makurian victory

Belligerents
Rashidun Caliphate	Kingdom of Makuria

Commanders and leaders
Uqba ibn Nafi; Amr ibn al-As	Qalidurut

Strength
20,000 Cavalry	8,000-10,000 Archers & Cavalry

Casualties and losses
10,000-15,000 killed or wounded	2,000 killed or wounded

The First Battle of Dongola took place in 642 between the Rashidun Caliphate and the Christian kingdom of Makuria. The Muslim expedition encountered strong Makurian resistance, particularly from Nubian archers, and subsequently withdrew from Nubia.

The engagement ended with the withdrawal of the Muslim expedition from Nubia, temporarily checking further Rashidun incursions into Makuria. Relations between Makuria and Muslim-ruled Egypt subsequently stabilized before renewed conflict in 652 led to the second battle of Dongola.

== Background ==
In the sixth century, the area that had once been under the domination of the Kingdom of Kush converted to Christianity. This included the kingdoms of Alodia, Makuria and Nobatia, which rested on Egypt's southern border. Over a century later, Islam united the Arabs into an expanding military and political force by 632.

In 640, the military leader Amr ibn al-As conquered Byzantine Egypt. To consolidate Muslim control over Egypt, it was inevitable to secure its western and southern borders. Amr accordingly sent expeditions to Byzantine North Africa and Makuria's Nubia.

== Engagement ==
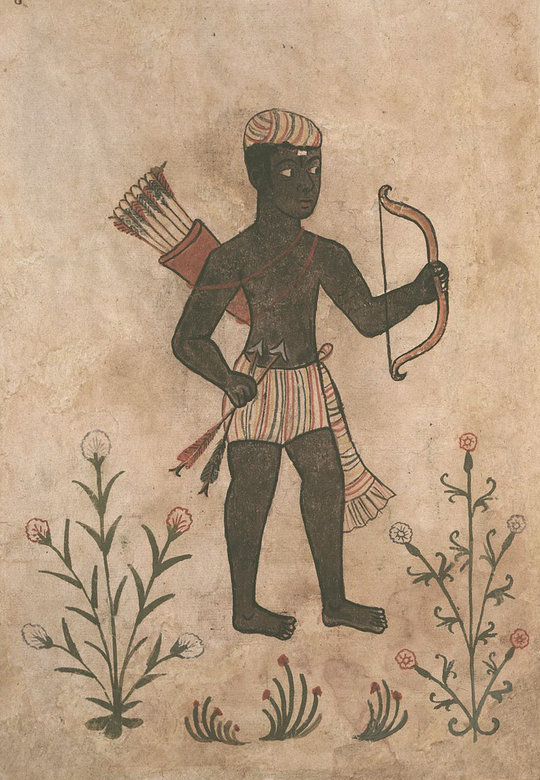
A Nubian archer as depicted in the Codex Casanatense circa 16th century. The depiction is not contemporary to the 7th-century conflict and should not be taken as a reliable representation of the equipment or appearance of Nubian soldiers at the time.

In 642, Amr ibn al-As sent an expedition under his cousin Uqba ibn Nafi into Makuria. Modern estimates have placed the Muslim force at around 20,000 cavalry, although the surviving early Muslim accounts do not provide a reliable figure for its strength. The expedition reached Dongola, the capital of Makuria, where it encountered strong resistance from Makurian forces.

According to historian al-Baladhuri, the Muslims found that the Nubians fought strongly and met them with showers of arrows. Many of the Muslims returned wounded, including with injuries to the eyes. Al-Baladhuri preserves an account in which the Nubians were associated with the epithet "pupil smiters" because of their skill in striking the eyes of their opponents. He also quotes a source who had visited Nubia twice during the reign of Umar: "One day they came out against us and formed a line; we wanted to use swords, but we were not able to, and they shot at us and put out eyes to the number of one hundred and fifty."

The fighting is not clearly described in the surviving Muslim sources as a conventional pitched battle. Rather, the accounts describe encounters and skirmishes in which Makurian forces made extensive use of archery and mobile tactics. The Muslim expedition was unable to achieve a decisive victory and subsequently withdrew from Nubia.

== Arab withdrawal from Nubia ==
The surviving Arab accounts do not provide a clear numerical casualty total for either side. They describe substantial Muslim losses from Nubian archery, including numerous wounded and the reported loss of 150 eyes, but do not give a reliable total number killed or wounded. Modern estimates of the strength of the Makurian forces have been given as 8,000–10,000 archers and cavalry, although this figure is not provided by the early Muslim sources.

The Arab sources also indicate that the fighting in Nubia did not consist solely of a single pitched battle. They describe an encounter in which Uqba ibn Nafi and his forces encountered a concentration of Nubian troops, followed by fighting in which the Nubians made effective use of archery. The accounts emphasize the difficulty faced by the Muslims in bringing the Nubians into close combat.

Arab accounts also attribute the Nubians' effectiveness to mobile and hit-and-run tactics. They describe the Nubians engaging from a distance with bows and avoiding prolonged close-quarters combat. These accounts portray the Muslim expedition as being repeatedly frustrated by Nubian tactics rather than being decisively defeated in a single large pitched battle.

Regardless of the precise nature and scale of the fighting, Uqba ibn Nafi was unable to achieve his objective and reported the difficulty of campaigning in Nubia. According to the later accounts, he also characterized the region as offering little immediate material incentive for continued campaigning. Amr ibn al-As subsequently ordered the expedition to withdraw.

== Aftermath ==
Al-Baladhuri states that Amr ibn al-As decided to withdraw his forces because of the difficulty of the campaign, the limited immediate prospect of obtaining booty, and the effectiveness of the Nubian military. The expedition therefore ended without the conquest of Makuria. The sources indicate that relations between the Rashidun-controlled administration in Egypt and Christian Makuria subsequently developed toward a formal peace arrangement during the administration of Abdullah ibn Saad, around 645. This arrangement, commonly associated with the Baqt, endured until renewed hostilities in 652 and the second battle of Dongola.

== Sources ==
- al-Baladhuri, Ahmad ibn Jabir (1916). The Origins of the Islamic State, Part I. Translated by Philip Khuri Hitti. New York: Columbia University.
- Álvarez, Jorge (March 5, 2025). "Bakt, the Longest-Lasting Treaty in History, Was in Effect for Seven Centuries". La Brújula Verde (LBV).
- Ashraf, Shahid (2004). Encyclopaedia of Holy Prophet and Companions. New Delhi: Anmol Publications PVT. LTD. p. 5054. ISBN 81-261-1940-3.
- Clark, Desmond J.; Roland Anthony Oliver; J. D. Fage; A. D. Roberts (1975). The Cambridge History of Africa Volume 2 c. 500 B.C. - A.D. 1050. Cambridge: Cambridge University Press. p. 847. ISBN 0-521-21592-7.
- Jennings, Anne M. (1995). The Nubians of West Aswan: Village Women in the Midst of Change. Boulder: Lynne Rienner Publishers. pp. 179 Pages. ISBN 1-55587-592-0.
- Lobban, Richard (2003). Historical dictionary of ancient and medieval Nubia. Lanham: Rowman & Littlefield. pp. 511 Pages. ISBN 0-8108-4784-1.
