= Qubba =

Domes in Islamic architecture

A qubba (Arabic: قُبَّة, romanized: qubba(t), pl. قُباب qubāb), also transliterated as ḳubba, kubbet and koubba, is a cupola or domed structure, typically a tomb or shrine in Islamic architecture. In many regions, such as North Africa, the term qubba is applied commonly for the tomb of a local wali (local Muslim saint or marabout), and usually consists of a chamber covered by a dome or pyramidal cupola.

== Etymology ==
The Arabic word qubba was originally used to mean a tent of hides, or generally the assembly of a material such as cloth into a circle. It's likely that this original meaning was extended to denote domed buildings after the latter had developed in Islamic architecture. It is now also used generally for tomb sites if they are places of pilgrimage. In Turkish and Persian the word kümbet, kumbad, or gunbād has a similar meaning for dome or domed tomb.

== Historical development ==
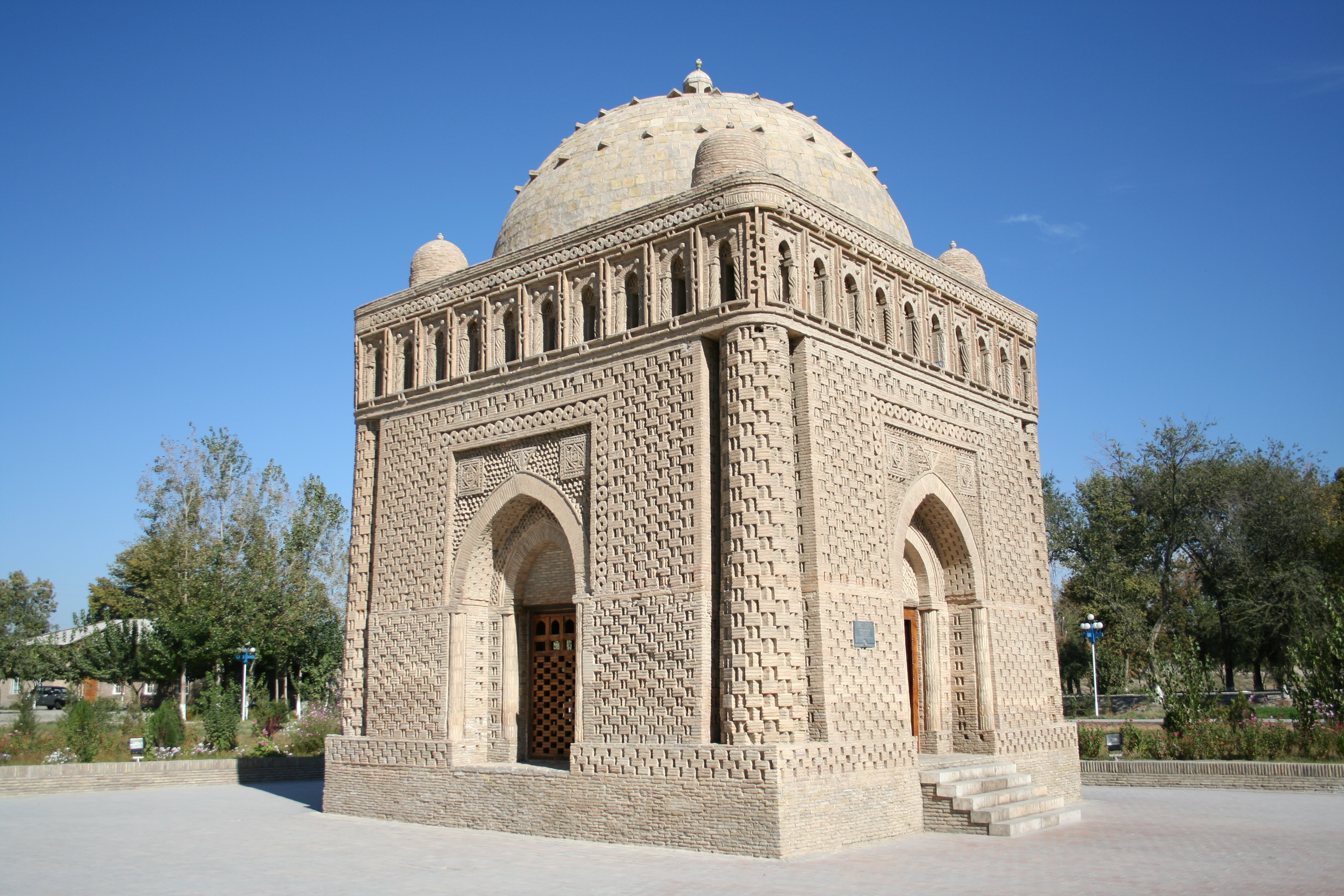
Samanid Mausoleum in Bukhara, Uzbekistan (10th century)

A well-known example of an Islamic domed shrine is the Dome of the Rock, known in Arabic as Qubbat aṣ-Ṣakhra (Arabic: قُبَّةُ ٱلْصَّخْرَة), although this particular monumental example is exceptional in early Islamic architecture. In early Islamic culture, the construction of mausoleums and ostentations tomb structures to commemorate the deceased was viewed as unorthodox, as Muhammad himself opposed such practices. However, historical records indicate that from the 8th century onward mausoleums became common, propagated in part by their popularity among the Shi'a, who built tombs to commemorate the Imams which in turn became places of religious ceremony and pilgrimage. The oldest surviving example of a domed tomb in Islamic architecture is the Qubbat al-Sulaibiyya in Samarra, present-day Iraq, dating from the mid-9th century. The construction of domed tombs became more common among both Shi'as and Sunnis during the tenth century, although early Sunni mausoleums were mostly built for political rulers. An example of the latter is the Samanid Mausoleum in Bukhara, present-day Uzbekistan, built in the tenth century.

== In Yazidism ==
Yazidi shrines and sacred buildings typically have conical spires that are known as qubbe in Kurdish.

== See also ==
- Persian domes
- Early medieval domes
- High medieval domes
- Late medieval domes
- Islamic pilgrimage
- Maqam (shrine), regional term: wali or weli
- Mazar (mausoleum)
- Qubbat as-Sakhrah, Arabic name of the Dome of the Rock
- Türbe, Ottoman mausoleum
