= Second battle of Dongola =

652 battle between the Caliphate and Makuria

- Part of the Arab conquest of Egypt
Date	652
Location	Near Old Dongola, Sudan
Result	Makurian victory; Baqt between Makuria and Rashidun Caliphate

Belligerents
Rashidun Caliphate	Makuria

Commanders and leaders
Abdallah ibn Sa'd	Qalidurut

Strength
5,000 men including cavalry and 1 catapult	Considerable number of archers on city walls

Casualties and losses
Unknown	Unknown

The second battle of Dongola or siege of Dongola was a military engagement between early Arab forces of the Rashidun Caliphate and the Nubian-Christian forces of the kingdom of Makuria in 652. The battle ended Muslim expansion into Nubia, establishing trade and a historic peace between the Muslim world and a Christian nation. As a result, Makuria was able to grow into a regional power that would dominate Nubia for over the next 500 years.

== Background ==
Relations between the kingdom of Makuria and Rashidun Egypt had gotten off to a rocky start in 642 with the first battle of Dongola. After their defeat, the Arabs withdrew from Nubia and something of a peace had been established by 645. According to the 14th-century Arab-Egyptian historian al-Maqrizi, Makuria did something to violate the truce. It was then that Abdallah ibn Sa'd, the successor of the first governor of Arab Egypt, invaded Makuria in an attempt to bring the Makurians to heel. At this time, northern and central Nubia were united under the Makurian king Qalidurut.

Archaeological discoveries show that Dongola was a well fortified city in the seventh century. It had walls at least 6 metres (20 ft) high and 4 metres (13 ft) wide at the base with towers. These were constructed of mudbricks in mortar and faced with stone. The round corner towers were 6 metres wide and projected 8 metres (26 ft) out from the wall. There were another two towers on the north wall. The towers, however, may have been added after, and possibly in response to, the siege of 652.

== Battle ==
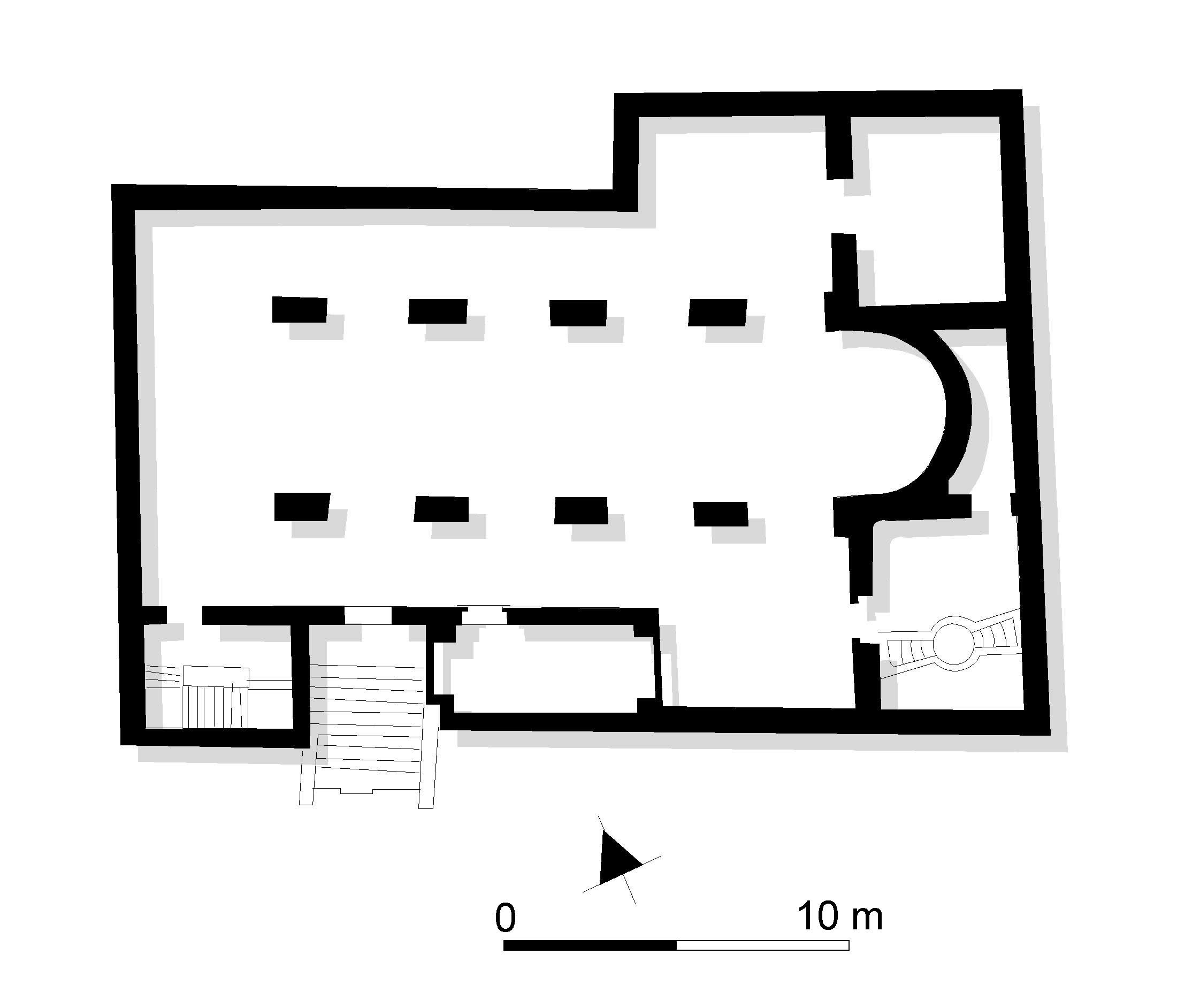
Ground plan of the so-called "Old Church", which was damaged by catapults during the siege

Abdallah marched a force of 5,000 men to the Makurian capital of Dongola in 651. He was equipped with heavy cavalry and a catapult (manjaniq), probably a traction trebuchet, which according to al-Maqrizi the Makurians had never seen before. He then laid siege to the city, putting his cavalry in the precarious situation of storming a walled city defended by the infamous Nubian archers. During the siege the town's cathedral was damaged by catapult fire. (A damaged church has been discovered outside the remains of the city walls dating to the mid-seventh century.)

The siege ended in a pitched battle. The casualties incurred by Abdallah's forces were heavy, and Qalidurut did not sue for peace. In the end, Abdallah called off the siege in exchange for negotiating a pact (baqt). According to the 9th-century Egyptian historian Ibn 'Abd al-Hakam this was because "he was unable to defeat them". The 10th-century Shiite historian Ahmad al-Kufi, who had no sympathy for the forces of the caliph, had an even stronger opinion: "The Muslims had never [before] suffered a loss like the one they had in Nubia." An Arab poet describing the battle wrote:

"My eyes ne'er saw another fight like Damqula [Dongola],
With rushing horses loaded down with coats of mail."

In the centuries that followed, however, the siege and second battle of Dongola were transformed by Muslim historians into a victory. Qalidurut was said to have come out of the city submissively seeking terms, according to al-Maqrizi. It may be that this version of events stems from the conflation of the events of 652 with late 13th-century conflict between Nubia and the Mamluks.

== Aftermath ==
The details of the second battle of Dongola are scarce, but we do know that the forces of the caliphate suffered enough casualties that taking their objective—the city of Dongola—was no longer possible. A negotiated truce known as the Baqt was agreed upon by both sides and lasted for six centuries. It set up trade relations between Muslim Egypt and Christian Nubia. It involved the exchange of wheat, barley, wine, horses and linen from Egypt for 360 slaves per year from Nubia.

The Baqt was without precedent in the early history of Islam. Also new to the paradigm of Muslim-Non Muslim Relations was Nubia's status as a land free from conquest. Traditionally, Nubia was made the exception. It was a Christian region where its rulers did business with Muslim rulers on equal terms well until the 12th century when the power of Nubia began to wane. As a result of the battle and the Baqt, Christian Nubia had the space to flourish for the next 600 years.

== Sources ==
- Adams, William (1977). Nubia: corridor to Africa. Princeton: Princeton University Press. pp. 824 Pages. ISBN 0-691-09370-9.
- Burns, James McDonald (2007). A History of Sub-Saharan Africa. Cambridge: Cambridge University Press. p. 418. ISBN 978-0-521-86746-7.
- Clark, Desmond J.; Roland Anthony Oliver; J.D. Fage; A.D. Roberts (1975). The Cambridge History of Africa Volume 2 c. 500 B.C. – A.D. 1050. Cambridge: Cambridge University Press. p. 847. ISBN 0-521-21592-7.
- Hrbek, I. (1988). UNESCO General History of Africa, Vol. III: Africa from the Seventh to the Eleventh Century (Abridged ed.). Berkeley: University of California Press. pp. 399 Pages. ISBN 0-85255-093-6.
- Jennings, Anne M. (1995). The Nubians of West Aswan: Village Women in the Midst of Change. Boulder: Lynne Rienner Publishers. pp. 179 Pages. ISBN 1-55587-592-0.
- Kissling, H.J. (1969). The Muslim World A Historical Survey Part III, The Last Great Muslim Empires. Leiden: Brill. pp. 302 Pages. ISBN 90-04-02104-3.
- Purton, Peter Fraser (2009). A History of the Early Medieval Siege, c. 450–1220. Boydell Press.
- Shinnie, P. L. (1954). Medieval Nubia. Sudan Antiquities Service.
- Spaulding, Jay (1995). "Medieval Christian Nubia and the Islamic World: A Reconsideration of the Baqt Treaty". The International Journal of African Historical Studies. 28 (3): 577–94. doi:10.2307/221175. JSTOR 221175.
- Werner, Roland (2013). Das Christentum in Nubien. Geschichte und Gestalt einer afrikanischen Kirche [Christianity in Nubia. History and shape of an African church] (in German). Lit. ISBN 978-3-643-12196-7.
- Zurawski, Bogdan (2021). "Christian and Islamic Nubia, 543–1820". Oxford Research Encyclopedia of African History. doi:10.1093/acrefore/9780190277734.013.407. ISBN 978-0-19-027773-4.
