= Bashmurian revolts =

Revolt by Egyptian Coptic Christians, c. 720–832

- Part of the persecution of Copts
Date	c. 720 – 832
Location	Bashmur, Egypt
Result	Egyptian rebels defeated

Belligerents
Umayyad Caliphate (720, 749); Abbasid Caliphate (767, 831–832)	Egyptian rebels

Commanders and leaders
749: Ḥawthara ibn Suhayl; 767: Yazīd ibn Ḥātim; 831–832: al-Afshīn	749: Mina, son of Apacyrus †

The Bashmurian (Note: Also Bashmuric, Bashmurite, Bushmuric or Peshmurian.) revolts (Coptic: Ⲡⲓⲧⲱⲟⲩⲛ Ⲙ̀ⲡⲓϣⲁⲙⲏⲣ; Egyptian Arabic: ثورة البشموريين) were a series of revolts by the Egyptian Copts in the Bashmur region in the north of the Nile Delta against the Umayyad Caliphate and Abbasid Caliphate in the eighth and ninth centuries. Exactly how many revolts took place cannot be determined, but the major military conflicts took place in 749, 767 and 831–832.

The Bashmurian revolts are known from Coptic and Arabic sources. They did not become known in Europe until the early nineteenth century.

== Background ==
The early years of Arab rule over the Copts were marked by relative peace but eventually gave way to significant subjugation and economic oppression. Both Coptic and Arabic sources attribute them to oppressive taxation and the unjust treatment of Christians by some Umayyad and Abbasid governors.

This was particularly evident during the reign of the caliph al-Walid I, under which the Copts faced harsher restrictions on their language and religious practices, and particularly with the enactment of a regressive poll tax and threats of the destruction of their churches. The Bashmurian revolts aimed to overthrow Arab rule and liberate Egypt from foreign oppression. While initially successful, these revolts ended disastrously for the Copts. The suppression of the Bashmurian revolts not only crushed the resistance, but destroyed Bashmur and resulted in many Copts sold into slavery, which made future organized rebellions impossible.

== Location ==
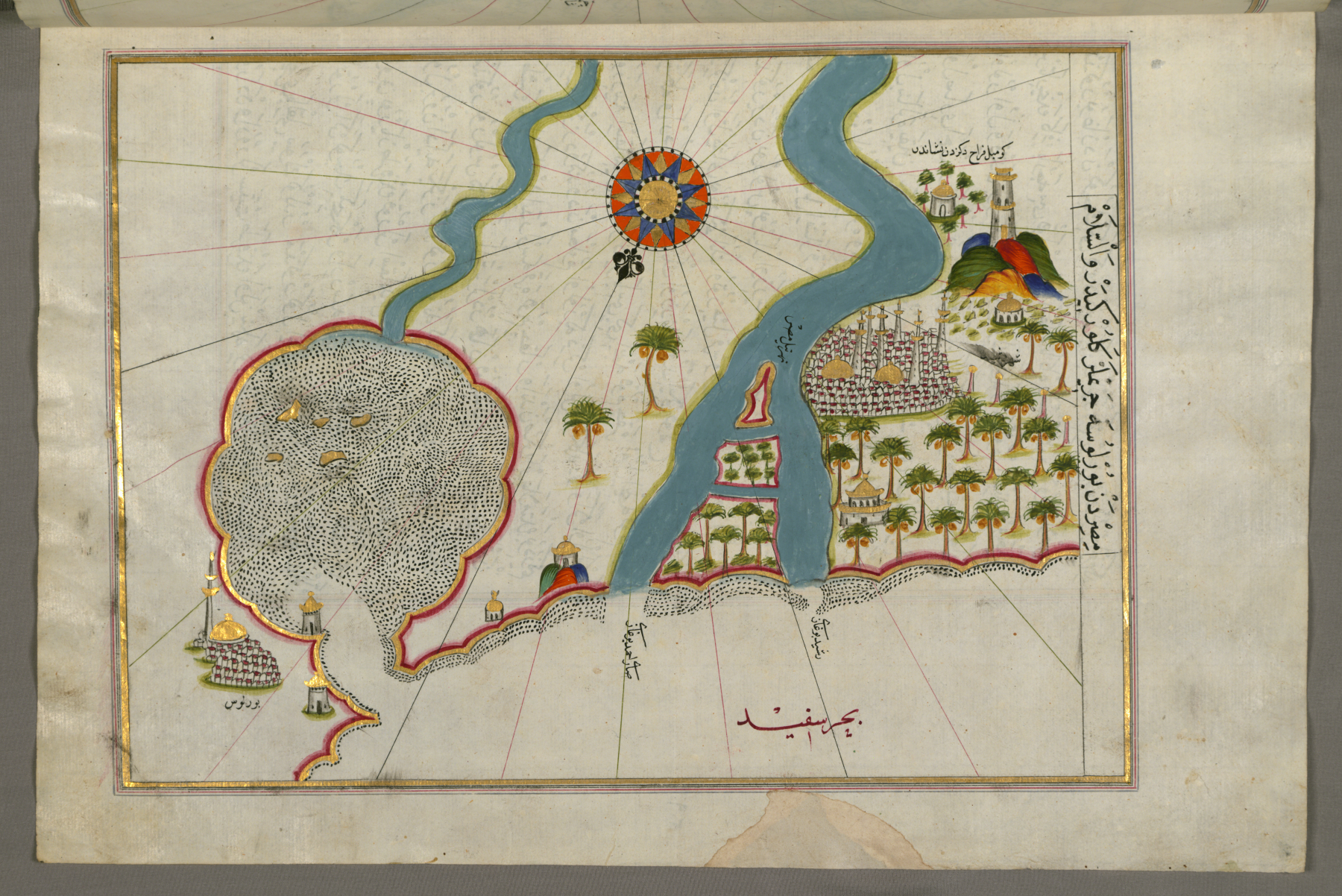
Map of an area comprising Bashmur on the map of Piri Reis

The exact boundaries of Bashmur varied over time depending on where the Bashmurians were settled. At the time of the revolts, it seems to have lain across the northern Delta just south of the Mediterranean from Fuwwa in the west to Ashmun al-Rumman in the east. By the thirteenth century, the Bashmurians seem to have been confined to the eastern Delta. In the eighth century, they were perhaps concentrated in the west, around the lake of Edku.

Bashmur was a region of marshland with sand banks and dense cover of reeds. Nowhere else in Egypt was more propitious for armed rebellion. Access to inhabited places was provided through narrow sandy banks and the reeds provided cover for soldiers. Moreover, Arabs did not settle in the Bashmur, leaving the population religiously unmixed. The economy of the region also favoured the Bashmurians, who relied on limited agriculture, fishing and hunting birds for food. Less dependent on irrigation works than the fellahin, they were capable of resisting long sieges. The Bashmurians also sold papyrus and possibly raised cattle.

The rebels and inhabitants of Bashmur were also known in the Arabic sources under the name Biyama (بيَمة), which Eutychius derives from Coptic ⲡⲁϩⲙⲉ lit. 'the offspring of forty', relating to a story that when the Byzantines withdrew from the Delta, only forty men remained behind in Bashmur, and that they were the ancestors of the Biyama. This etymology is more legendary than historical, as al-Maqrīzī states that all Copts living in Lower Egypt are called Biyama. It is rather to be derived from a Coptic word for "cattle herdsman" (Coptic: ⲡⲓⲁⲙⲏ, romanized: piamē), a Greek translation of which is βουκόλος "herdsman", another name for the Bashmurian rebels and the inhabitants of the marshy eastern shore of the Lake Burullus called Boucolia (Ancient Greek: τὰ Βουκόλια), who also revolted against the Roman rule under the lead of Isidorus in the 2nd century.

== Military actions ==
It is impossible to say when the first Bashmurian revolt in the region broke out. Although there had been Coptic revolts in Egypt as early as the seventh century, most were quickly crushed. Only the Bashmurians were able to resist for long periods, inflict heavy losses on the government and endure long sieges. Of the nine recorded Egyptian revolts between 693/694 and 832, only the Bashmurian revolts required the personal intervention of the caliphs.

=== 720 ===
According to al-Kindī, during the governorship of Bishr ibn Ṣafwān (April 720 – April 721), the Byzantine navy landed at Tinnis. Ibn Aḥmar, the son of the local ruler, Maslama al-Murādī, was killed. The northern Delta area does not appear to have been under Umayyad control at the time, and may have been controlled by rebels.

=== 749 ===
By 749, the Bashmurians were in open revolt. The leader of the rebels is called Abū Mina by al-Kindi and Mina ibn Bāqīra (Menas, son of Apacyrus) in the History of the Patriarchs of Alexandria. It is not unusual for a Coptic name beginning with apa- to be interpreted as a kunya with Abū in Arabic. This revolt began in Shubra near Samannūd.

According to Sāwīrus ibn al-Muqaffaʿ, multiple land and sea campaigns by the governor Ḥawthara ibn Suhayl had failed to subdue them. The failure of the governor to crush the revolt prompted the Caliph Marwān II to come in person with an army from Damascus. Although he proposed an armistice, the Bashmurians rejected it and the army was sent against them from Damascus.

At this juncture, Ḥawthara took the Coptic patriarch, Michael I, hostage to Rosetta, and threatened to have him killed if the Bashmurians did not lay down their arms. The Bashmurians attacked Rosetta and sacked it, massacring its Arab inhabitants. There was an offensive as far as Pelusium against an Umayyad army. In response, Marwān ordered the pillaging and razing of Coptic villages and monasteries throughout the Delta. His campaign was a failure and in 750 he was overthrown in the Abbasid Revolution. The Abbasids granted an amnesty to the Bashmurians and exempted them from taxes for their first two fiscal years. Abū Mina was killed during the revolt.

=== 767 ===
A general revolt of the Delta took place in 767. The Bashmurians (called Bashruds in the Arabic sources) joined with Arab settlers against the Abbasid government. Local officials were killed, and the governor Yazīd ibn Ḥātim sent a force against them, but it was defeated and forced to retreat to al-Fusṭāṭ.

=== 831–832 ===
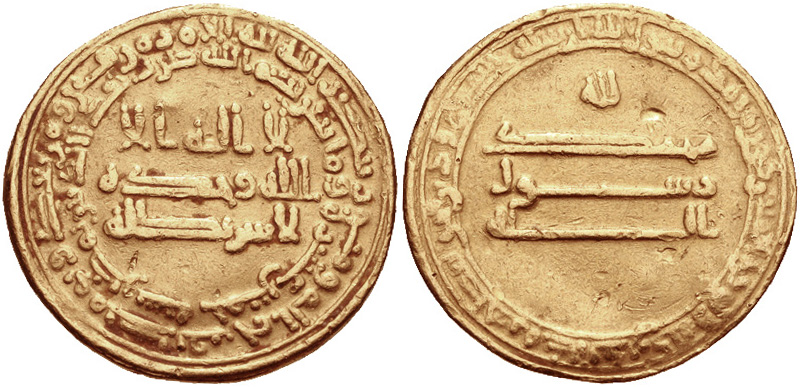
Gold dinar of al-Maʾmūn

The rebellion of 767 had never been brought properly under control when the Caliph al-Maʾmūn sent his Sogdian general al-Afshīn to the Delta in 830, 831 or 832. (Note: Megally 1991 gives 831; Feder 2017, pp. 33–35, and Gabra 2003, p. 116, give 832; Wissa 2020, cites al-Kindī, who dates the uprising to June–July 831 (that is, the month of Jumādā I in year 216 AH).) The rebels in the eastern Delta and in Alexandria were crushed, but the Bashmurians successfully resisted al-Ashfīn's efforts. They manufactured their own weapons. The Sogdian induced the patriarch Joseph I to send letters and bishops entreating the Bashmurians to come to terms, but the Bashmurians abused the bishops. When this failed, al-Ashfīn urged the caliph to come in person. The caliph brought with him Dionysius of Tel Mahre, patriarch of Antioch, to negotiate with the rebels. The offer of a general amnesty in return for surrender and resettlement was rejected, an indication of the importance the rebels attached to geography.

The negotiations failed, al-Maʾmūn launched a large attack from Shubra near Samannūd, guided by natives from Shubra and Tandah, resulting in high losses on both sides. When al-Maʾmūn offered an armistice, the rebels accepted. Their success was short-lived. Many armed men were executed, women and children end up deported to Iraq or sold as slaves in the slave markets of Damascus. The region of Bashmur was burned and systematically destroyed to prevent further uprisings.

According to some historians, the crushing of the rebellion in 832 demoralized the Coptic Christian population. The Christian Copts were heavily pressured to convert to Islam.

== Legacy ==
Al-Kindī writes that "from then on God made the Copts small throughout the country of Egypt and destroyed their power and no one was able to outrage and oppose the sultan". Gawdat Gabra consider the defeat of the final Bashmurian revolt a pivotal event that sapped the Copts' vitality and broke their spirit of resistance which he regards as "the last rebellion of the Copts and perhaps the last armed resistance of Egyptian people—not as an organized army—against the oppression of foreign occupation."

Medieval Coptic historiography has a generally negative attitude towards the Bashmurians. It lays stress on the general obedience of the Coptic church to the government. The History of the Patriarchs (Note: This section of the History was written by John the Writer, sometimes called John II to distinguish him from the early contributor John the Deacon.) portrays the rebels of 831 as rebels against both legitimate secular authority and legitimate ecclesiastical authority for refusing to obey the patriarch. Their defeat is the due penalty for their disobedience. Later Egyptian writers who mentioned the Bashmurians include Abu ʾl-Makārim (13th century), who called them "ignorant"; Ibn al-Rāhib (1257), who knew of the revolts of 749 and the 830s; and Athanasius of Qus (14th century), who wrote of the region of Bashmur and the Bashmuric dialect, which he called extinct. This dialect remains a phantom to linguists and its mention may only attest to the already legendary character of the Bashmurian revolts by the late medieval period.

Syriac historiography, (Note: Such as Michael the Syrian and the Chronicle of 1234.) which depends on the eyewitness account of Dionysius of Tel Mahre, is slightly more sympathetic to the Bashmurians. Dionysius views them as having a legitimate grievance and seeking redress. He also describes episodes of Abbasid cruelty, such as the attempted rape of a Coptic woman.

== Bibliography ==
- Belyaev, E. A. (1969). Arabs, Islam and the Arab Caliphate in the Early Middle Ages. Praeger. ISBN 9780269025174.
- Brooks, E. W. (1913). "The Relations Between the Empire and Egypt from a New Arabic Source". Byzantinische Zeitschrift. 22 (2): 381–391. doi:10.1515/byzs.1913.22.2.381. S2CID 191661543.
- Dunn, Michael Collins (1975). The Struggle for ʿAbbāsid Egypt (PhD diss.). Georgetown University.
- Feder, Frank (2017). "The Bashmurite Revolts in the Delta and the 'Bashmuric Dialect'". In Gawdat Gabra; Hany N. Takla (eds.). Christianity and Monasticism in Northern Egypt: Beni Suef, Giza, Cairo, and the Nile Delta. American University in Cairo Press. pp. 33–36.
- Gabra, Gawdat (2003). "The Revolts of the Bashmuric Copts in the Eighth and Ninth Centuries". In W. Beltz (ed.). Die koptische Kirche in den ersten drei islamischen Jahrhunderten. Institut für Orientalistik, Martin-Luther-Universität. pp. 111–119. Archived from the original on 22 March 2020.
- Goddard, Hugh (2000). A History of Christian–Muslim Relations. Rowman & Littlefield. ISBN 1566633400.
- Lapidus, Ira M. (1972). "The Conversion of Egypt to Islam". Israel Oriental Studies. 2.
- Mikhail, Maged S. A. (2014). From Byzantine to Islamic Egypt: Religion, Identity and Politics after the Arab Conquest. I. B. Tauris. ISBN 978-0-85772-558-5.
- Megally, Mounir (1991). "Bashmuric Revolts". In Aziz Suryal Atiya (ed.). The Coptic Encyclopedia. Vol. 2. New York: Macmillan Publishers. cols. 349b–351b.
- Ohta, Keiko (2004). "The Coptic Church and Coptic Communities in the Reign of al-Maʾmūn: A Study of the Social Context of the Bashmūric Revolt". Annals of the Japan Association for Middle East Studies. 19 (2): 87–116.
- Stowasser, Karl (2022). Al-Maqrīzī: Book of Exhortations and Useful Lessons in Dealing with Topography and Historical Remains, Part IIa (PDF). Brill.
- Tadros, Samuel (2013). Motherland Lost: The Egyptian and Coptic Quest for Modernity. Hoover Institution Press. ISBN 9780817916442.
- Toomey, Jeremy (2015). Modern Spoken Coptic and Community: Negotiation of Linguistic Authenticity (MA thesis). University of New Mexico.
- Wissa, Myriam (2016). "Yusab of Alexandria, Dionysius of Tel-Mahre, Al-Maʾmun of Baghdad, the Bashmurites and the Narrative of the Last Rebellion in ʿAbbasid Egypt: Re-considering Coptic and Syriac Historiography". In P. Buzi; A. Camplani; F. Contardi (eds.). Coptic Society, Literature and Religion from Late Antiquity to Modern Times: Proceedings of the Tenth International Congress of Coptic Studies, Rome, September 17th–22nd, 2012. Orientalia Lovaniensia Analecta, 247. Louvain. pp. 1045–1062.
- Wissa, Myriam (2020). "The Last Revolt of Bashmūr (831 A.D.) in Coptic and Syriac Historiography". In Johannes Preiser-Kapeller; Lucian Reinfandt; Yannis Stouraitis (eds.). Migration Histories of the Medieval Afroeurasian Transition Zone: Aspects of mobility between Africa, Asia and Europe, 300–1500 C.E. Brill. pp. 247–260. doi:10.1163/9789004425613_010. ISBN 9789004425613. S2CID 218993688.
