= John the Deacon (Egyptian chronicler) =

John the Deacon was a Coptic Orthodox chronicler whose Life of the Patriarch Michael, finished c.768–70, is the most important source for Christian Nubia in the first half of the eighth century. His book, written in Coptic, was later translated into Arabic and incorporated as the second part of the History of the Patriarchs of Alexandria.

John was a spiritual disciple of Bishop Moses of Awsim, one of the most revered Coptic churchmen of his age.

The later historian Sawirus ibn al-Muqaffaʿ made heavy use of John's Life, and although John is one of the only sources for the time and place, he is not always reliable. For instance, he records a Nubian invasion of Egypt that reached as far as Fustat in 745, after the Egyptians refused to release Michael, Patriarch of Alexandria. This event appears to be a conflation of a real invasion of Upper Egypt and the imprisonment and liberation of the patriarch, made to coincide with a known period of Coptic uprisings and consequent persecution at the instigation of the Caliph Marwan II. John is the only source to describe the dynastic struggles that followed the death c.730 of Merkurios, whom he refers to as a "new Constantine". He is the earliest source to mention thirteen kings ruling Nubia under the high king Kyriakos at Old Dongola. He is also an early source for the Arab slave trade.
