= Markos of Makuria =

8th-century king of Makuria

Markos, Marcus, or Mark (Old Nubian: ⲙⲁⲣⲕⲟⲥ, Markos) was briefly king of Makuria in Nubia during the mid-8th century.

== Life ==
According to the History of the Patriarchs of Alexandria, Markos was selected to reign by his aged predecessor Zacharias, just like the previous two kings. King Abraham had entered into a feud with the bishop of Dongola that escalated to the point that Abraham had threatened Pope Michael I with returning his kingdom to paganism. Zacharias then deposed Abraham, exiled him to an island in the Nile River, and selected Markos as his replacement.

"Friends of Mark" felt this was insufficient and prepared to kill Abraham on his island. "Partisans of [K]ing Abraham" learned of this plan, however, and killed Markos while he was praying in church. The account in the History of the Patriarchs of Alexandria does not mention Zacharias in the succession of Kyriakos to the throne, suggesting he may have died beforehand.

Preceded by Abraham	King of Makuria	Succeeded by Kyriakos
