= Pope Mina of Alexandria =

Pope Mina of Alexandria may refer to:

- Pope Mina I of Alexandria, ruled in 767–775
- Pope Mina II of Alexandria, ruled in 956–974
