= Military history of Sudan =

The military history of Sudan, includes wars, fighting, the rise of states of power, and the resistance of forces along the Nile, the Red Sea coast, the Sahel and the southern frontiers. Its beginning lies in traces of fighting at Jebel Sahaba, then Kerma, Kush, Meroë, Medieval Nubia, the Funj, Darfur, Turco-Egyptian rule, the Mahdiyya, British conquest and modern Sudan.

== Pre Kerma ==
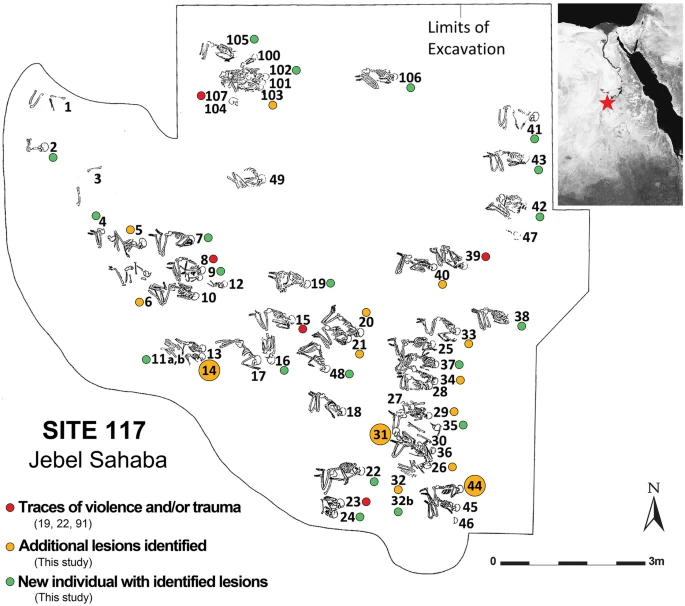
Location of the Jebel Sahaba cemetery.

The military history of Sudan begins in the Northern State, at Jebel Sahaba, where numerous bodies with marks of blows from small stones were found, dating back more than eleven thousand years. This may have been a mass battle between two groups of the Qadan culture. In any case, it is among the earliest known evidence of warfare in Sudan and Northeast Africa and the World. Evidence of a large-scale war is not found until the advent of writing and historical records.

When the first Egyptian state arose, skirmishes began between them and the people of the Middle Nile, culminating in the Egyptian king Djer's invasion of Nubia by Nile boats. He subdued its inhabitants and crippled their trade and financial power. After him, Sneferu marched into Lower Nubia, not only for wealth but also for captivity, enslavement and plunder. His victory was recorded on the famous Palermo Stone, and from that time onward, Nubia became a military and economic target for the Egyptian state.

During the reign of Senusret, the raids transformed into garrisons and border fortifications. The Egyptians established fortresses along the Nile and prohibited Nubian boats from operating without the Egyptian emperor's permission. Then Senusret III marched south until he reached the Dal Cataract, pursuing groups believed to be descendants of the Kingdom of Kerma. He defeated and drove them back, subjugating the societies of Lower Nubia and subjecting them to the authority of the Egyptian kingdom.

== Kerma ==
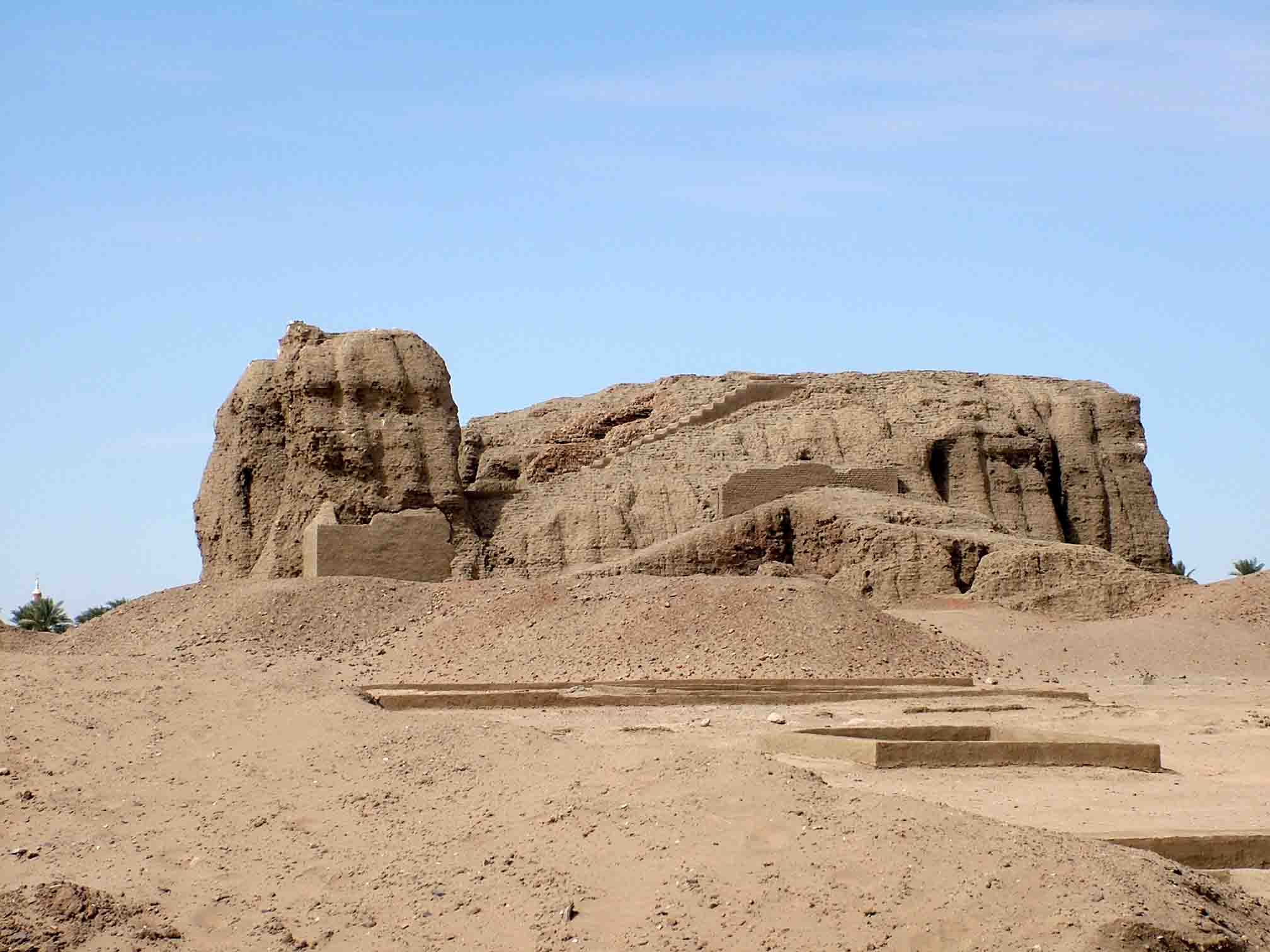
Western Deffufa in ancient Kerma.

When the Middle Kingdom of Egypt weakened, the Kingdom of Kerma arose. The fall of the fortress of Buhen marked the first breach of this Egyptian control, as Kerma's cavalry occupied the fortress and drove the Egyptians north. Their raids then reached Upper Egypt, where they captured the city of Elkab around 1575 BC. At that time, Egypt was torn apart between the Hyksos and the rival pharaohs.

When Ahmose defeated the Hyksos and unified Egypt, he began a war against Kerma. The campaigns continued until Kerma retreated and disappeared. Then came Thutmose I, who razed it to the ground and broke its power He recorded his victories on the Tombos Stela found in lower Nubia. Thutmose III then marched with the Egyptian army until he reached the Fourth Cataract. From that time onward, Nubia became like a part of Egypt to the Egyptians, who called it Kush. It remained under their rule until Egypt weakened and the Kushite kingdom arose.

== Kush ==
When the Egyptian-Libyan kingdom collapsed, the Kushites took advantage of this. Piye marched from the south, besieged Hermopolis (Ashmunein) and humiliated its ruler, Nimlot, by subjecting him to the abject rituals of the pharaohs. He then used the Nile as a route to attack Memphis. He seized the ships and led his army to the river walls, capturing the city without a long siege. Within a year, Egypt was subject to this southern conqueror and the Twenty-fifth Dynasty was established.

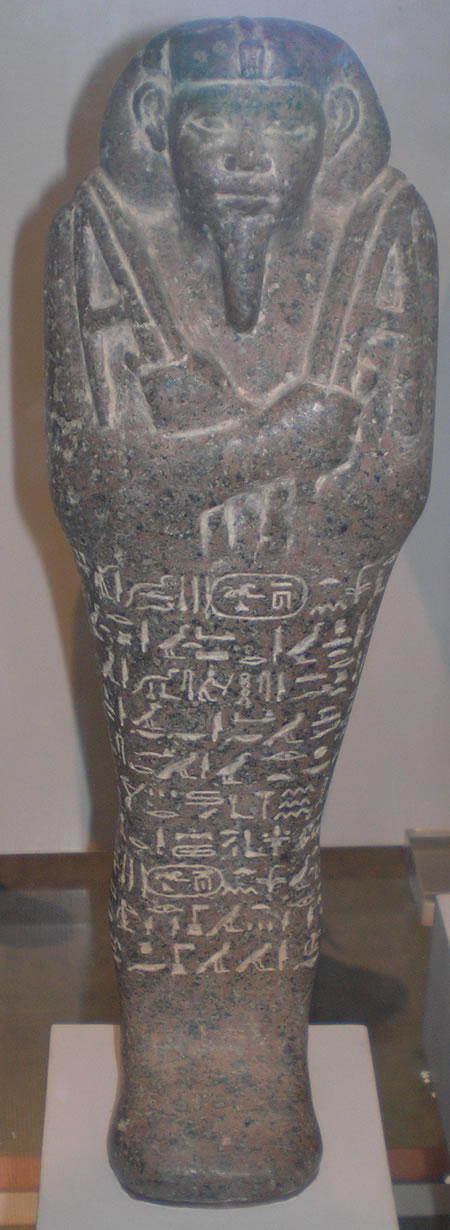
The Pharaoh Taharqa.

Then Taharqa and Tantamani tried to preserve the Kushite kingdom in Egypt, but they were unsuccessful. The armies of the conquering Assyrians advanced upon them, driving them out of Egypt and destroying Thebes in 663 BC, plundering its temples and wealth. Psamtik II then led a campaign to Napata, the Kushite capital, accompanied by Greek and Carian mercenaries. He struck at their heartland and humiliated them, forcing them to retreat south to Meroe.

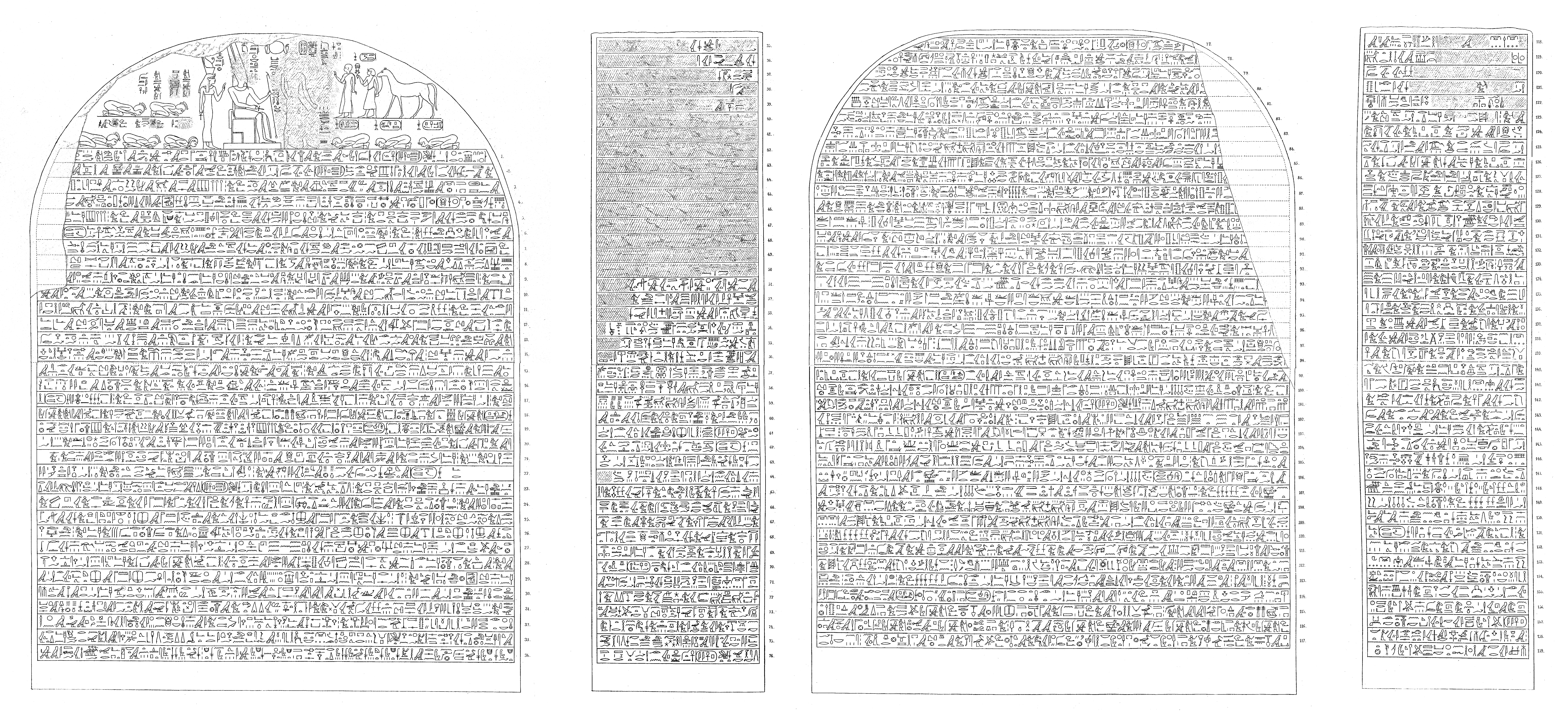
Piye victory stela.

== Meroe ==
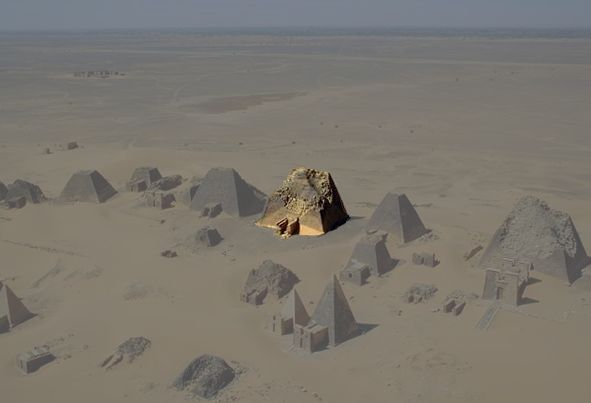
Pyramids of Meroe.

They settled in Meroe, and their wars intensified and multiplied, eastward, northward and southward. Meroe transformed from a bronze culture to an iron culture. This transformation made Meroe much more militaristic. One of the most remarkable stories recounts is that Nastasin, the Kushite king, repelled an attack on Egypt during the Persian period, capturing wealth, livestock, boats and prisoners from the invaders, then inscribing this victory on a stone. Then they remained in a state of alternating war and peace with those who ruled Egypt, until the Romans came and conquered Egypt, making it a province of theirs.

At that time, Amanirenas, a woman from Meroe known as the Kandake, launched an attack on the Romans on the borders of Egypt. She fought them and attacked the cities of Siena, Elephantine and Philae. Petronius responded with a Roman force, defeating the Kandake's army and marching south, capturing the city of Pelusium. The Romans described the Kushites as poorly organized and well-armed. However, the Kandake did not surrender. She returned and attacked the fortress of Qasr Ibrim. The matter ended with a peace treaty concluded on the island of Samos. The Romans withdrew from Qasr Ibrim and the Kingdom of Meroe pledged not to invade The Roman Province of Egypt. A long peace ensued between them.

After losng many of its elites the kingdom of Meroe was subjected to long instability and became poorer after Aksumites developed their own red sea trade, its condition changed drastically. Its capital was plundered and destroyed at the hands of the Christian Abyssinians and their allies, around the year 350 AD. The Axumites, who were Christians, invaded them, along with the Blemmyes from the east and the Nodas calavry from the west. They utterly destroyed Meroe, demolishing its palaces and temples, leaving only tombs and graves standing. This event marked the end of the Kushite kingdom after it had lasted for nearly 1400 years. During these campaigns, Ezana ravaged the land of the Butana region of Meroe, destroying it and plundering its livestock and wealth. This occurred on his way to Meroe, where he had defeated the whom he called Red and Black Nobas. After Meroe was emptied of its inhabitants, the Nubian horsemen migrated to those lands, settled there and took possession of them.

== Medival Nubia ==
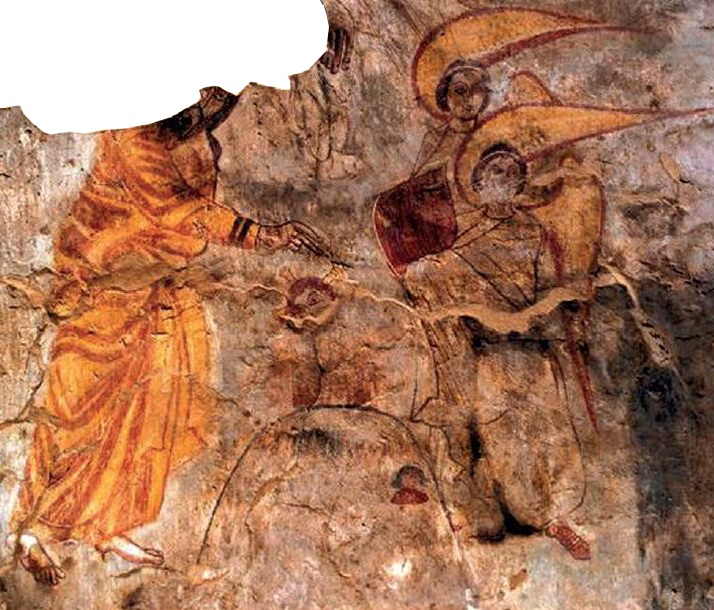
Wall painting from Old Dongola.

Remarkably, the oldest known cemetery for the sheikhs and warriors of those tribes was found in a place called Balana and Qustul, dating from between 300 and 400 AD. This cemetery marked the beginning of the Nubian kingdoms in the Middle Ages. Subsequently, four Nubian kingdoms arose alongside the kingdom of the Blemmyes. Around 500 AD, Seku, king of the kingdom of Nobatia, fought the Blemmyes around the city of Talmis, which the Romans called Kalabsha, south of Aswan. Seku defeated the Blemmyes twice, then annexed those regions to his kingdom, strengthening his power.

Between 537 and 537 CE, Justinan the Roman emperor, ordered the closure of the Philae temple in Lower Nubia and forced the priests to abandon the worship of Amun and the idols. In 543 CE, the Nubian king Seku converted to Christianity, specifically the Coptic Orthodox faith and built temples with Greek assistance.

=== Rashidun Caliphate ===
Roman Egypt soon fell to the Rashidun Caliphate at the hands of the Arab conquerors. The Amir of Egypt Amr bin Al as dispatched Uqba ibn Nafi to Upper Egypt, his troops entered Lower Nubia, reaching as far as Dongola. There, the first battle between the Muslims and the Nubians took place, resulting in a Muslim defeat. This defeat was due to the Nubians' skill in long-range archery, coupled with the heavy casualties suffered by the Muslim army. Then, ten years later, during the reign of The Caliph Othman, he dispatched Abdullah ibn Abi Sarh against the Nubians, employing powerful catapults that bombarded the city with stones. When the Nubians realized they could not withstand this onslaught, they sought peace and security. A treaty was agreed upon, later known as the Baqt Treaty. The Kingdom of Makuria remained somewhat independent, providing security for the Muslims and guaranteeing freedom of trade and religion for any Arabs who wished to bypass through their lands.

=== Umayyad Caliphate ===
Then, in the seventh century CE, the Umayyad Caliphate expanded, conquering the Red Sea coast and securing it from bandits and raids by the Blemmyes and Abyssinians. During the caliphate of Abd al-Malik ibn Marwan, 97 AH (715-717 CE), the Muslim armies seized the Dahlak Islands in the Red Sea, establishing them as a forward outpost to protect against African raids. When the Beja raids on the Muslim borders increased, The Caliph sent Ubayd Allah ibn al-Habhab sent army against them, which quelled their aggression and subdued them.

As the Umayyad Caliphate fell and the Abbasids rose, the Copts rose up in protest against their taxation and the imprisonment of Pope Michael I of Alexandria. The Nubian king Cyriacus then marched into Egypt c. 748 with an army implausibly said to number 100,000 men. As the Nubians approached the provincial capital of Fustat (now Cairo), the Umayyad governor released Michael and Cyriacus's own imprisoned envoy, successfully negotiating the Nubians' return south without a fight.

=== Abbasid Caliphate ===
As for the Beja, they first broke their treaty in the year 226 AH (820 CE), attacking Upper Egypt, capturing hundreds of people and then fleeing. Then, in the year 236 AH (831 CE), Caliph al-Ma'mun dispatched a campaign against them, led by Abdullah ibn al-Jahm, as recounted by al-Maqrizi. They were defeated and their king, Kanun, was captured. Al-Ma'mun stipulated that they pay tribute, protect Muslims in their lands, and that the lands of the Beja, from Aswan to the borders of Dahlak and Badi', would be a crown subject to the Abbasids. When they submitted to these terms, he facilitated the entry of Arab merchants and adventurers into their territory. Among these were those seeking gold from the mines of al-'Alaqi and the Bayuda Desert, located between the lands of the Beja and Makuria. The kingdom of Makuria was displeased with this arrangement and waged war against these adventurers, most notably al-'Umari, who encamped near Abu Hamad. The Makurians fought him over the gold mines.

Then, in the year 254 AH (854 CE), the Beja broke the treaty a second time, refusing to pay tribute from the gold mines and killing the workers and adventurers in the Nubian Desert. Caliph al-Mutawakkil dispatched his commander, Muhammad ibn Abdullah al-Qummi, from Upper Egypt, who launched a land and sea campaign against them. He devised a ruse involving bells, which confused the Beja on their camels, causing their defeat. Their king, Ali Baba (or Awlbab), was captured and al-Qummi forced them to pay tribute for four years. He then took the king prisoner to Samarra to force him to acknowledge Abbasid authority.

In the ninth century CE, the Rabi'a entered the gold mines of al-Alaqi and Aydhab, intermarrying with Beja leaders. This alliance disrupted the balance of power in the desert, strengthening the Beja through the Rabi'a, and vice versa, against their rivals. The historian al-Mas'udi, said: "Rabi'ah ibn Nizar settled in Ma'din al-Dhahab, al-'Alaqi, and 'Aydhab, and their power grew. They intermarried with the Beja, so the Beja were strengthened by Rabi'ah, and Rabi'ah was strengthened by the Beja against their common enemies."

In 943 AD the Arab-Bejan Banu Kanz monarchy was established bordering the arid yet full of gold region from Aswan to Wadi Allaqi.

Then King George II invaded Egypt during the Ikhshidid era in the year 556 AH (956 CE), killing a number of Muslims. Kafur al-Ikhshidi then dispatched an army against him under the command of Muhammad ibn 'Abd Allah al-Khazin, who marched to Ibrim in the year 563 AH (963 CE), but he was unable to subdue the Nubians. Then in the year 568 AH 968 CE, the armies of Makuria advanced northward, controlling parts of Upper Egypt and even reaching Akhmim.

=== Fatimid Caliphate ===
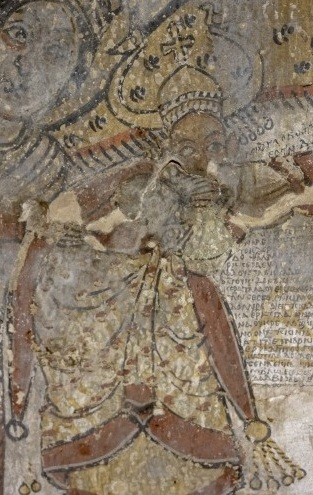
Possible depiction of king David from Dongola

After the 969 CE Fatimid chancellor, Jawhar al-Siqilli sent a diplomatic mission with gifts to King George II of Makuria to request Baqt arrears and invite him to Islam. George declined conversion but agreed to continue the Baqt payments.

Fatimid alliances with Makuria and the Banu Kanz secured Egypt's southern border, protecting trade and labor routes. The relationship stayed generally peaceful and commercial, although it worsened in the last Fatimid period when its enterd the phase of civil war and regency.

The Fatimids were an Isma'ili Shi'i caliphate in rivalry with the Sunni Abbasid Caliphate and the wider Islamic Sunni world behind it. Thus Fatimids lack of recognition made stable relations with Christian Nubia important and served mutual needs.

Demand for Black African soldiers in Egypt strengthened the southern Nile slave trade. The sources use terms such as al-Sudan, al-Nuba and Black African troops broadly, nearly all of Black soldiers in Fatimid Egypt where not of Christian or Nubian origin. Nubians still formed an important military and social element. Arabic sources mention that Jawhar hired the Nubian commander Bashara in 361 AH / 972 CE.

Black eunuchs, enslaved soldiers, servants and concubines also became important in Fatimid Egypt. Their rise gave black people rare social mobility, especially inside the palace, but it did not remove their enslaved status. Rasad, the mother of al-Mustansir, was a Black slave concubine of the Fatimid Caliph al-Zahir, then became royal mother, regent and one of the most powerful women in the Fatimid court.

During the Fatimid civil war under al-Mustansir Billah, the army split along ethnic military blocs, especially the Turkish faction under Nasir al-Dawla ibn Hamdan and the Black African regiments, while Arab, Berber, Armenian, Daylamite and other corps also shaped the crisis.

The crisis weakened Fatimid control over Upper Egypt and the southern frontier, disturbed the older Nile trade and Baqt order, and helped Makuria and the Banu Kanz act with greater autonomy against the new regency authority.

In 1066-1067 CE, Nasir al-Dawla ibn Hamdan with his Turkish attempted to attack black soldiers and invade Lower Nubia, but he and his forces were defeated. This attempt occurred during the Fatimid civil war. In 1076-1077 CE, Muhammad Kanz al-Dawla, an Arab Nubian, rebelled in Aswan against Badr al-Din al-Jamali. Badr al-Din fought him, killing Kanz al-Dawla and suppressing his rebellion. Around the year 472 AH (1079-1080 CE), as al-Maqrizi recounts, the Nubian king went to Aswan intending to build a church there. The governor of Qus arrested him and took him to Cairo. Badr al-Jamali honored him and bestowed gifts and favors upon him, but the king died before returning to his lands.

Shortly after the fall of the Fatimids, Nubians and remnants of the Fatimid Sudan regiments attacked Aswan in 1172–1173, but Kanz al-Dawla asked Saladin for help and the attackers were expelled. Shortly after, Banu Kanz rebelled against the Ayyubids when their old privileges in Upper Egypt were threatened.

=== Ayyubids ===
Shams al-Dawla al-Ayyubi suppressed a rebellion in Aswan and destroyed Qasr Ibrim, executing its leaders and establishing an Ayyubid fortress. Governor Ibrahim al-Kurdi ruled the territory until his death in 1175 CE, after which his forces returned to Egypt.

In 578 AH (1182 CE), the Crusaders began their raids on the Red Sea under the leadership of Reynald of Châtillon. They attacked the port of Aydhab.

=== Mamluks ===
In the year 666 AH (1268 CE), King Dawud overthrew the previous rulers of Makuria, deposing them and exiling them to the city of Atbara in the Kingdom of the Gates. He then sent word to Sultan al-Zahir Baybars informing him that he had become king of Nubia.

The scholar Ibn Kathir stated in his history, in the year 671 AH (1272 CE), that the "ruler of Nubia" raided Aswan and reached Aydhab, plundering its merchants, destroying its port and killing many of its inhabitants, including the governor and the judge. When news of this reached the Mamluk Sultan, he dispatched a punitive expedition from Qus, which entered the lands of al-Jun, Irim and Qasr Ibrim. They killed and burned as much of David's land as they could, but they were unable to capture David.

Under King David's unstable rule, his nephew Mashkad sought Mamluk assistance, prompting Sultan Baybars to intervene. The Mamluks defeated Dawud, installed Marmashkad as a vassal, and imposed heavy tributes. The campaign resulted in the liberation of prisoners, the destruction of strongholds and the eventual capture of David. Baybars imposed conditions on him, including: "I will not leave any of the Arabs in Nubia, and whoever I find among them, I will send to the sultan."

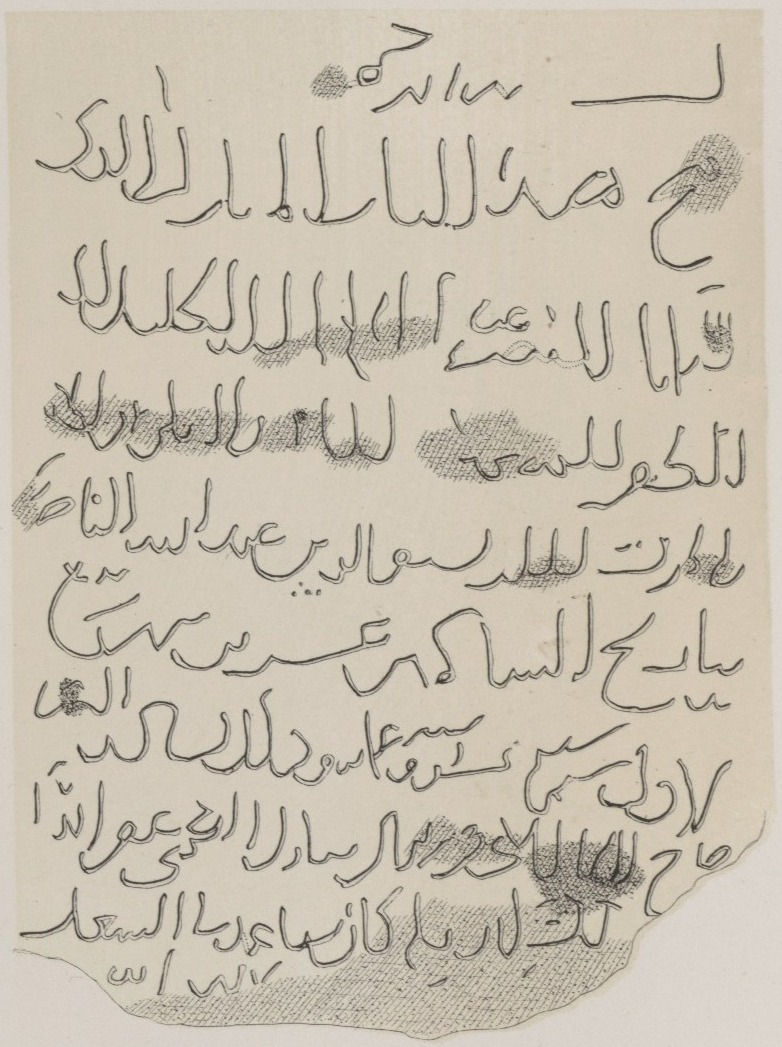
The foundation stela from the Throne Hall of Dongola written in Arabic, marking transformation into a mosque under King Abdallah Barshanbu on 1 June 1317.

When David committed to this, many Arabs fled Nubia. Some sought refuge in the Red Sea Mountains, others went south to Atbara and its surroundings. Others headed west to Kordofan. Those Arabs who remained in Nubia were either intermarried with the local people and adopted their Nubian culture, language and dress, while still adhering to Islam.

Then, in 1287 CE (686 AH), the dynastic crisis returned to Makuria. Sultan Qalawun sent an army to depose Samasun and install his nephew in his place. They failed to capture Samasun, but they did seize Prince Girgis a relative of his from the royal family known as the Suwakira and installed Budim as king before withdrawing. Samasun then managed to return to Dongola and expel Budim. In 1290 AD, Qalawun dispatched another, larger campaign, this time with Prince Girgis and King Budim. Samson did as he had done before, fleeing from Dongola to the Nile islands to its south, making it impossible for the Mamluk ships to reach him. However, the people of Dongola, including its princes and priests, reinstated Budima as king. When the Mamluks returned, Samson entered Dongola and carried out a brutal purge, killing a number of princes and priests, including Budima. Samson then reigned for five years.

Afterwards, Makuria was embroiled in a succession struggle until King Ayay was installed around 735 AH (1305 CE). He still faced opposition, so he traveled to Cairo seeking Mamluk support, which they granted. However, the instigator of the rebellion fled south, eluding capture.

The succession crisis resurfaced after Ayay being murderd by his borther, until one of the princes, who as the nephew of David, who had been captured by the Mamluks in 676 AH (1276 CE) claimed the throne. He had converted to Islam and named himself Abdullah. In 1315 AD, The Mamluks then marched to Dongola and installed him as king, whereupon he converted the church there into a mosque. This displeased the Nubian princes, who allied themselves with their brethren, the Banu Kanz, who were of Arab origin. Muhammad Kanz al-Dawla then killed Abdullah and installed Abram, the brother of the previous king and a Christian, as ruler. Abram was later deposed and Muhammad Kanz al-Dawla assumed power, becoming the first Nubian king of Arab descent. Makuria reverted to Christian rule after the reign of King Seti.

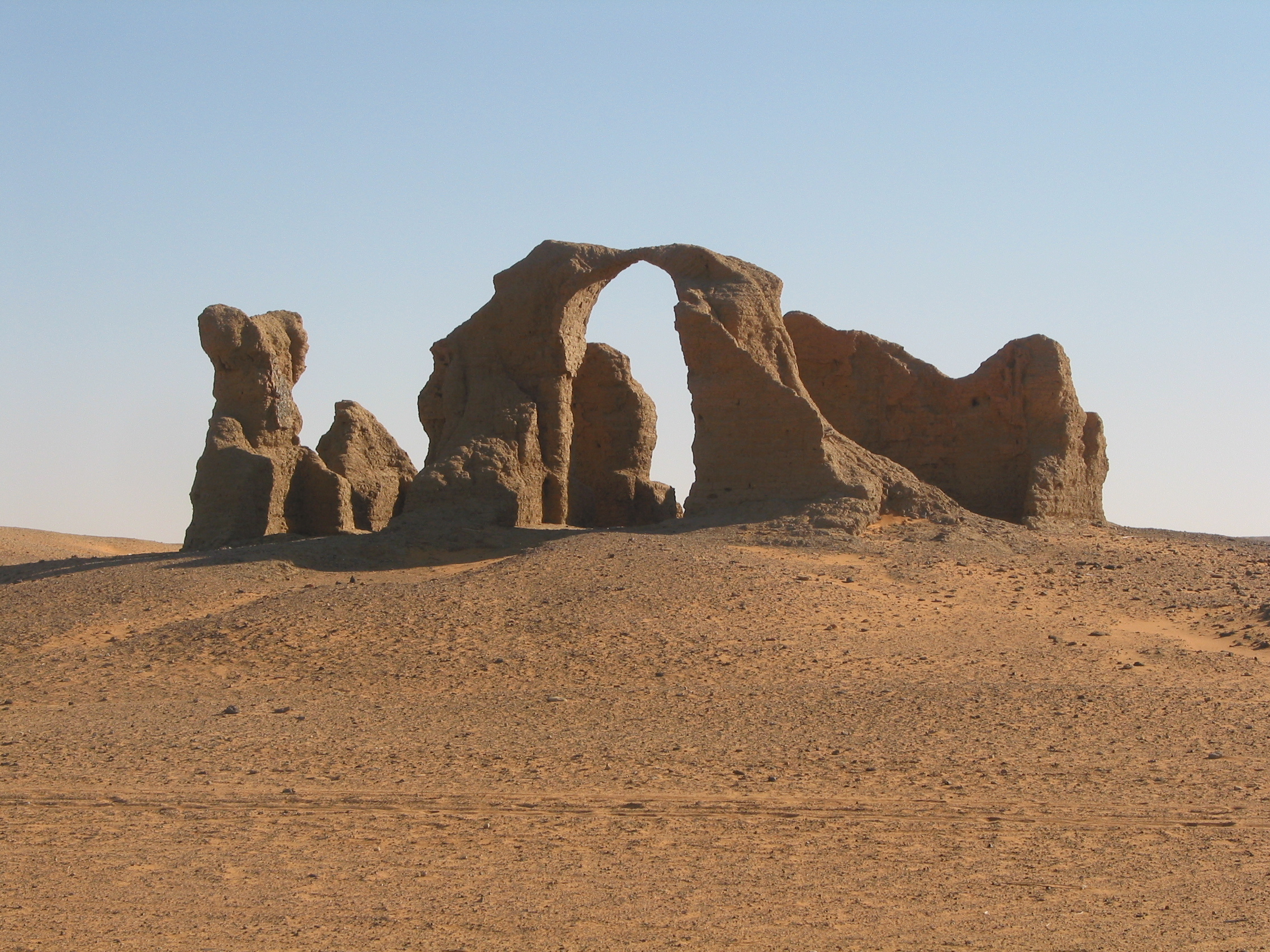
Old Dongola

A civil war erupted among the princes of Makuria in 766 AH (1365 CE), resulting in the deaths of many princes and the king himself. The kingdom was fragmented and its capital, Old Dongola, was lost, Makuria had become a rump state now confined to the area around Jebel Adah.

In the late 14th and early 15th centuries, Islamic entities expanded in the Horn of Africa, such as Ifat and Adal, while Arab tribal monarchies and alliances spread throughout the Atbara River region, the Butana, the Gezira and Kordofan. When Makuria was torn apart, the kingdom of Alodia found itself alone in the face of a new Arab space.

Al-Fahl al-Faki al-Tahir, in his book The Origins of the Arabs in Sudan, mentions that: A force from the Ja'aliyyin group and their allies from the Fazara, led by Hamidan, the Ja'aliyyin sheikh, moved from al-Arshkul in Kordofan in the year 881 AH (1476-1477 CE). They crossed the White Nile and joined forces with Haydar, Amir of Juhaynah in Nubia then clashed with the forces of Alodia at Soba for several days. They killed its king, entered the city and partly plundered it, after which Hamidan returned to Kordofan. However, the Alodia patriarch recaptured Soba from Haydar.

In 1504 CE (910 AH), Abdullah Jamma' and Funj leader Amara Dunqas allied to conquer Soba. After a fierce siege, they defeated Alwa's army and killed its king. The alliance destroyed the city, massacred or captured its inhabitants and resettled the area with the Mahas.

Following Amara Dunqas's victory over the Abdallab at Arbaji, the Sennar Sultanate was established with the Abdallab as subordinates. Ruling from Dongola to Fazughli, the state endured until the Egyptian conquest in 1821.

== Sennar ==
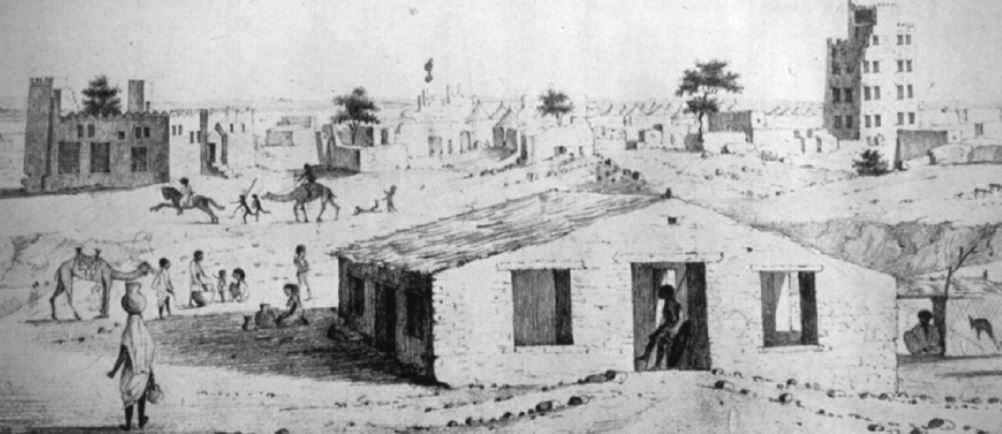
Sennar in 1821.

The history of Sudan between the 16th and late 19th centuries was marked by the rise and fall of the Funj and Darfur sultanates, followed by Turco-Egyptian rule and the Mahdist Revolution.

In the 16th century, the Funj Sultanate halted the Ottoman advance at Henik, thus establishing a fixed border between the two states that remained in place until 1821.

During the reign of Sultan Dakin (1568–1585), the Abdallabi leader Ajib I emerged powerful within the sultanate. Following Dakin's unsuccessful war along the Ethiopian frontier, Ajib secured higher autonomy Sennar. When Abd al-Qadir II overthrew Unsa in 1603 or 1604, Ajib launched a campaign into the Funj heartland, forcing the sultan's armies southeastwards and establishing his authority over territories extending from Dongola towards Ethiopia. In December 1606, the deposed Abd al-Qadir fled to Ethiopia, where he sought the protection of Emperor Susenyos, opening the possibility of Ethiopian intervention in Funj land.

The Funj recovered the initiative under Sultan Adlan I, whose forces defeated Ajib and killed him in 1611 or 1612. Adlan was himself deposed while pursuing the remaining Abdallabi forces northwards, and the throne passed to Badi I, a son of Abd al-Qadir II. Badi negotiated a settlement with Ajib's successors, recognising their authority over the territories north of the confluence of the Blue Nile and White Nile. Although the Abdallabi continued to acknowledge the sovereignty of Sennar, they governed these northern territories as subordinate rulers.

Although the Funj triumphed over the Ethiopian invasion in the battle of the Dinder River during 18th century thanks to the cunning of their cavalry under Muhammad Abu Likaylik, the state gradually weakened due to internal power struggles and the rise of the Hamaj, who became the de facto rulers after deposing Sultan Badi IV. Meanwhile, the Keira dynasty established the Darfur Sultanate in 1672 (1082 AH) under Sulayman Solong after winning 32 battles against different tribes in eastern Sahel, expanding to include Kordofan during the civil war between Hamaj commanders after the death of Muhammad Abu Likaylik.

In the late 18th century, the Ja'aliyyin, Shayqiyya and others began to exercise de facto independence from Sennar. The Shayqiyya expelled the Funj officials from Dongola and Berber after the state's power waned in the north. The heirs of Abu Likaylik also engaged in a prolonged internal conflict. The book of Shuna or The funj chronicles describes this period of Hamaj civil war as a hellish series of intrigues, battles and bloodshed within the ruling Hamajs, leading to widespread devastation in Sennar.

== Sudan ==
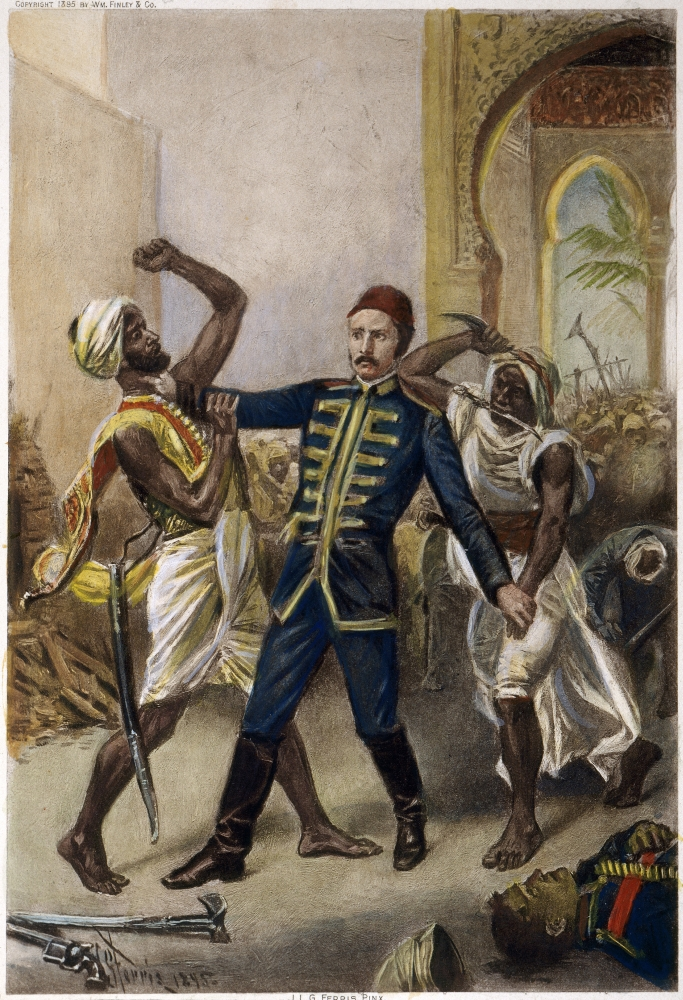
The fall of Khartoum in 1885.

In 1820 CE / 1235 AH, Muhammad Ali Pasha sent an expedition into the south under his son Isma'il Pasha, seeking territorial expansion, gold and enslaved Sudanese recruits for his new army. Turco-Egyptian accounts their southern targets under the name of "Sudan", initially referred to the Sahel region. al-Jabarti wrote that Muhammad Ali said to conquer "the districts of Sudan", with people saying that the expedition was heading either to Sennar or to Darfur, while later accounts of the campaign described the submission of North Nubia and Dongola before the capture of the Funj capital, Sennar. Al-Jabarti records that Isma'il Pasha departed south in Dhu al-Qadah 1235 AH. The campaign captured the declining kingdom of Sennar in 1820–1821, with Sennar itself occupied in June 1821.

His son, Ismail Pasha, marched with a well-organized army equipped with rifles and cannons. He met the Shayqiya at Kurti and defeated them, then at Jabal al-Dayqa, where he inflicted a crushing defeat upon them thanks to his cannons. The last Shayqiya king, Shawish, surrendered along with three hundred horsemen and was granted the rank of Bimbashi (Major).

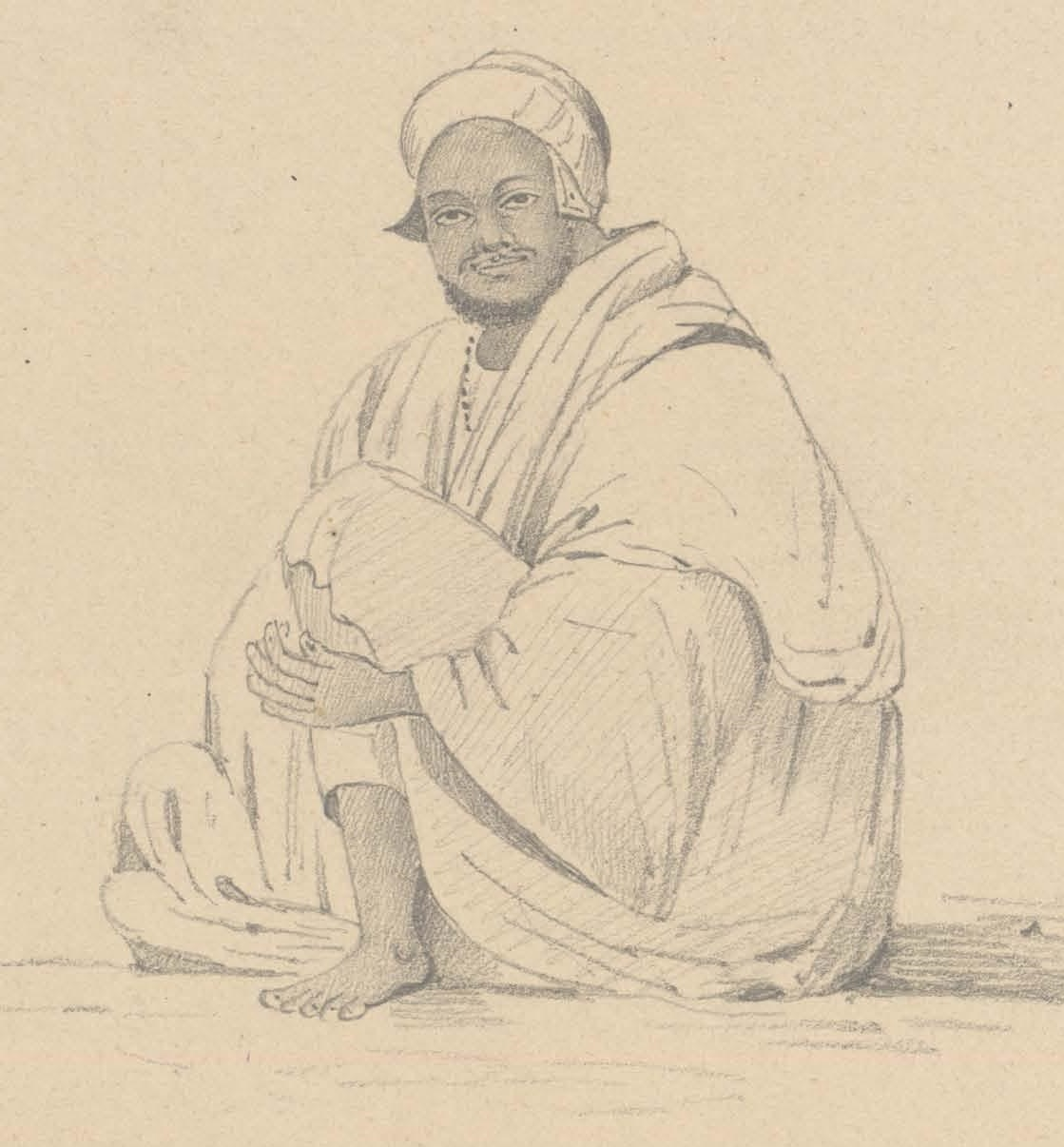
Drawing of Mek Nimr by Linant de Bellefonds, c. 1821

The army then marched to Sennar and entered it on 13 June 1237 AH (1821 CE). King Badi VI surrendered. They found the city in ruins, not the wealthy capital they had imagined, and many died from fever and the rains. They then established their headquarters in Wad Madani. Ibrahim and Ismail advanced south until they captured Fazughli, after which Ibrahim returned to Egypt, ill.

By 1237 AH/1821 CE, his forces had dismantled the Funj Sultanate after entering Sennar, and had invaded Kordofan, defeating the Darfur army at the Battle of Bara. In 1238 AH/1822 CE, taxes on livestock and slaves were increased, prompting a revolt by the people. Towards the end of the year, Mek Nimr, the ruler of Shendi, killed Ismail Pasha and burned him alive in his residence after he had been humiliated and demanded an exorbitant tribute. The people of the valley revolted, but the tribes were divided and could not unite, so the uprising failed. The Defterdar (treasurer) arrived and burned the country, destroying Shendi and Al-Matamma, and displacing the Ja'aliyin and Abdallab tribes. This consolidated Turkish rule in central Sudan, but bitterness and a painful memory remained.Then the Turks founded the city of Khartoum and made it their capital, and they called all those lands "Sudan."

This era ended with the Mahdist Revolution, which lasted from 1298-1302 AH/1881-1885 CE. Under the leadership of Muhammad Ahmad al-Mahdi, the movement achieved decisive victories over Egyptian and British forces. They destroyed Hicks' army at the Battle of Sheikan, besieged El Obeid until it surrendered, and then the Mahdi mustered fifty thousand fighters under three banners black, green and red and besieged Khartoum. The city fell on January 26, 1302 AH/1885 CE, and its commander, Gordon, was killed. Thus ended Turco-Egyptian rule and was replaced by the Mahdist state.

== Mahdist Wars ==
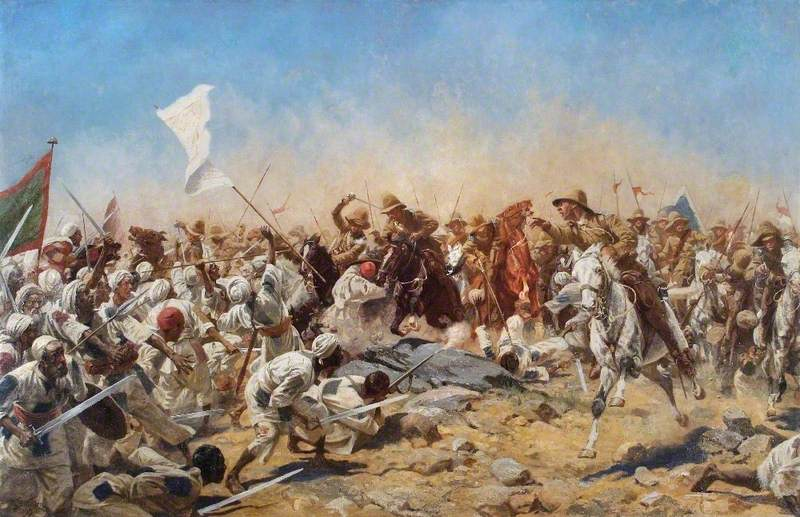
The Battle of Omdurman.

After the fall of Khartoum in 1885, people thought that Sudan had entered a new era, and that the Turks had vanished like sand in the wind. Winston Churchill described the impact of the first Mahdist victory, saying "Men with sticks had slain men with rifles".

However, the Mahdi died in June of the same year and the rule shifted from salvation prohecy to Caliphate.

Abdullah al-Ta'aishi assumed the Caliph and moved the center of power to Omdurman. He transformed it into a military base, a marketplace, a prison and a pulpit. He consolidated the military forces, elevated the people of the west, demoted the nobles and monitored the Nile and its people. Slatin Pasha, in his original English, describes the Caliph's inclination towards his own people: "to gather his own tribe and relatives about him".

Here, the state became a tribal jihadi entitiy.

In the north, the Mahdists attempted to open the gates of Egypt. The Battle of Ginnis in 1885 secured the gates. Then, in 1889, Abd al-Rahman al-Nujumi marched to Toshka, obeying the Abdullah al-Ta'aishi's. Al-Nujumi was defeated and died. With him, the illusion of conquering by zeal was shattered.

In the east, Osman Digna remained in the Red Sea's side. Suakin belonged to the British, while the interior was held by the Beja and Ansar, and the road between them was a dry war. There was no complete state there, nor a complete defeat; rather, it was a cycle of advances and retreats, weapons and famine, mountains and valleys. The East was an open door, but a door that devoured armies, not a state.

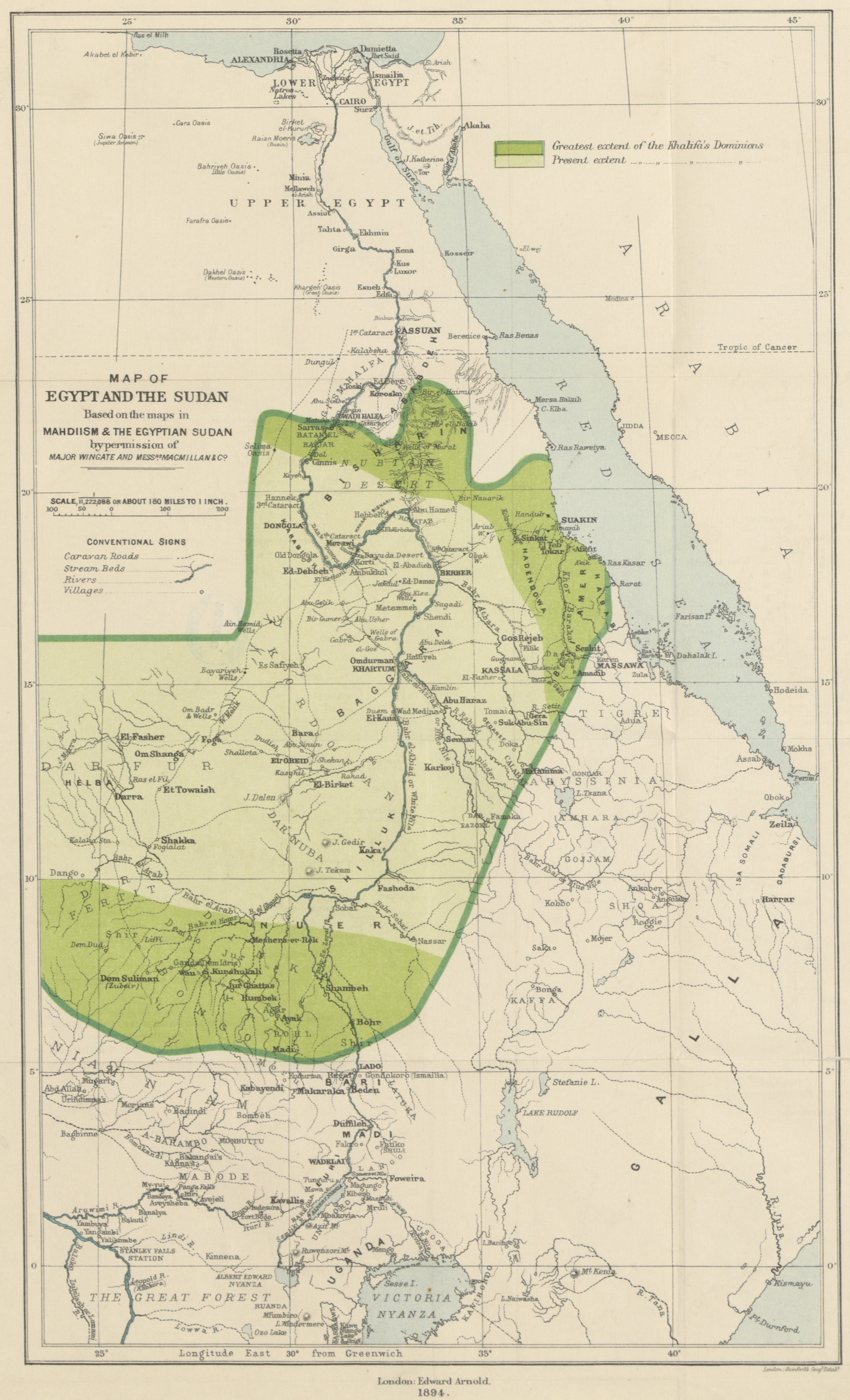
1894 map of the jihadist Mahdist State.

As for Abyssinia, the war there was a distant fire. Abu Anja marched to Gondar in 1887, entered it and plundered it. Then Yohannes IV came as far as Gallabat and Metemma in 1889. He fought like a king, then died in battle and his army was thrown into disarray. Churchill captures the meaning of that war in a harsh phrase about its cost: "The terrible slaughter of the Abyssinian war."

Internally, the state intensified until it became harsh. In 1886 The Mahdi Caliph relocated tribes, elevated some and massacred others. The famine of 1888–1892 occurred, The population dropped by half. Slatin quotes Ibrahim Adlan as rebuking the Caliph: "You have estranged the hearts of all those who have been faithful to you."

Then the Anglo-Egyptian recounqest began. Churchill wrote of the desert railway: "The Sirdar ordered the railway to be constructed."

Kitchener was building the war before he fought it. Firka fell, then Dongola, then Abu Hamad, then Berber and the road to Atbara was opened.

In April 1898, Mahmud Wad Ahmed fortified himself in the Zariba near Atbara, along with Osman Digna. He thought that the trench, thorns and spears would stop the modern army. But the artillery breached the Zariba, the infantry entered, Mahmud was captured and Digna fled.

In September 1898, the Khalifa marched to Karari. The banners were gathered, the Ansar in massive numbers came as they had always come, but the British weapons were superior. Churchill wrote of the moment of the cannon and the fire: "It was a matter of machinery."

Then, describing the new instrument of war, he said: "The charging Dervishes sank down in tangled heaps."

Churchill did not deny the bravery. Three days after the battle, he wrote: "Yet these were as brave men as ever walked the earth."

He then concluded by saying, "The terrible machinery of scientific war had done its work."

The Khalifa fled westward, He said to his soldiers that wants to make Kordofan a second center of resistance. But the Kordofan had collapsed, Abdullah al-Ta'aishi was killed afte soldiers found him fleeing. In 1899, the Anglo-Egyptian Condominium Agreement was signed. : "The Sudan... shall be and remain under martial law." Thus, Sudan became nominally between Egypt and Britain, but in reality, under the British military officers command.

In November 1899, Wingate caught up with the Khalifa at Umm Diwaykarat. Abdullah was killed, along with Ahmad Fadil, Ali Wad Hilu and his senior men.

== Anglo-Egyptian Sudan ==
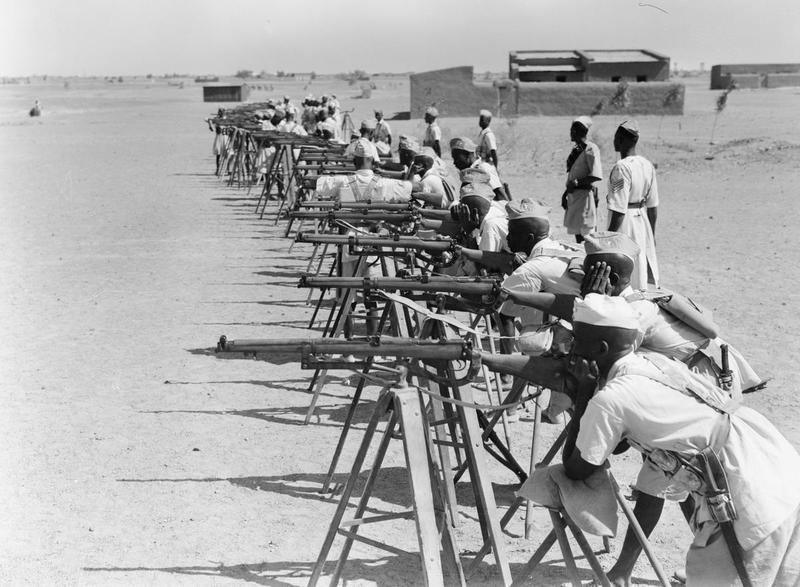
Sudan Defence Force recruits during the Second World War.

The British retained Egypt's name while maintaining their control over the military and government. The Governor-General became the head of state, its enforcer and the police commander. In 1925, Hansard declared, "The supreme military command of Sudan is delegated to the Governor-General."

Darfur remained outside direct control until World War I. The 1916 campaign defeated King Ali Dinar, and the capture of El Fasher marked the "final completion of Anglo-Egyptian Sudan."

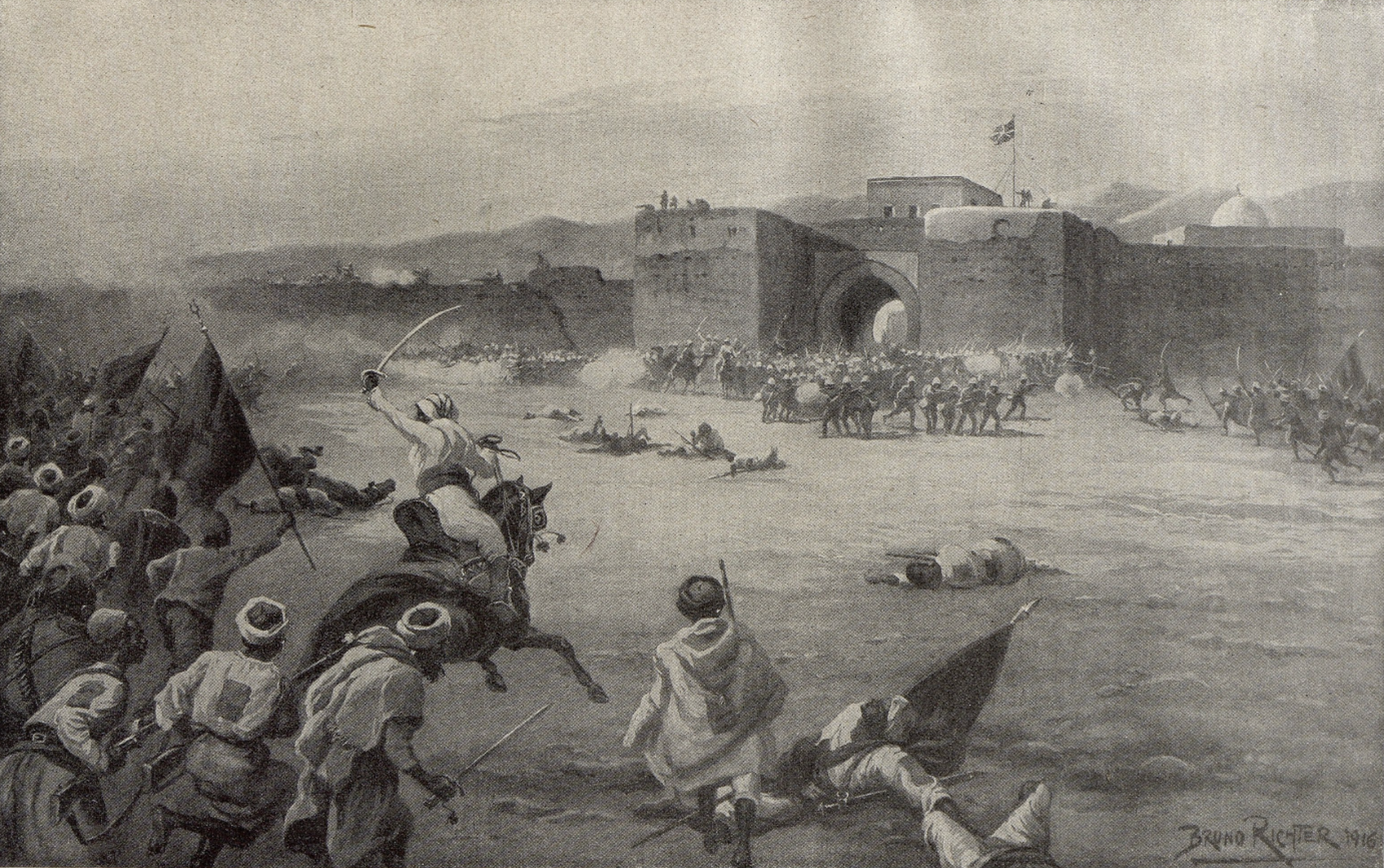
Invasion of Darfur, 1916

The White Flag League joined junior officers and junior civil servants. The 1924 revolution demonstrated that a trained soldier could become a rebellious outlaw. Following the assassination of Sir Lee Stack, Egyptian forces were withdrawn, the revolution was crushed and the Sudan Defence Force was established in 1925 after a "serious mutiny among Sudanese troops in Khartoum.

In World War II, Sudan became a strategic outpost. Italian forces entered Kassala, Gallabat, and Kurmuk in 1940, while the Sudan Defence Force was still conducting active patrols and pursuing a policy of "monitoring and harassing the enemy."

By 1955, the colonial army was riddled with internal divisions. In Torit, members of the Equatorial Sudan Defence Force, under British administration, mutinied and some subsequently joined the armed resistance. Sudan was granted independence in the midst of a civil war.

== Modern Sudan ==
Map of the war in Sudan.

After independence in 1956, Sudan entered statehood with an army that had not settled. The 1958 coup by Ibrahim Abboud showed that the army had become the shortest road to power. Modern Sudan later became marked by repeated coups and attempted coups.

The southern war turned the army into a national fault line. The 1972 Nimeiry Agreement with Ananya in Addis Ababa ended a "17-year conflict", but Nimeiry's later policies and the 1983 formation of the Sudan People's Liberation Army reopened the war.

The 1980s saw the state expanding militia warfare, fought in the south, 2000s saw the Darfur War.

After 2019, Bashir fell. The dispute over integrating the Rapid Support Forces into the army ignite the 2023 war, which turned Khartoum, Gezira and again Darfur into battlefield.

== Sources ==
- O'Fahey, R.S.; Spaulding, J.L (1974). Kingdoms of the Sudan. Studies of African History Vol. 9. London: Methuen. ISBN 0-416-77450-4.
