= Pope Mina =

Pope Mina may refer to:

- Pope Mina I of Alexandria, 47th pope of the Coptic Orthodox Church from 767-776.
- Pope Mina II of Alexandria, 61st pope of the Coptic Orthodox Church from 956-974.
