= List of rulers of Makuria =

The following is a list of the rulers of Makuria (also known as Nubia, Dotawo, Dongola, or Tungul), variously titled as emperors (Old Nubian: ⲃⲁⲥⲓⲗⲉⲱⲥ, basileōs), caesars (ⲕⲁⲓⲥⲁⲣⲁ, kaisara), or kings (ⲟⲩⲣⲟⲩ, ourou or uru). Makurian or Dotowan succession often proceeded matrilineally, from the reigning king to his sister's male child, his nephew.

== Rulers ==
Due to the paucity of sources on medieval Nubia, most dating is approximate and subject to future revision.

Name		Reign		Notes
Modern	Attested Form	Reign		Notes
...
Qalidurut	ﻗﺎﻟﻴﺪوروت (Qalīdurūt) (Arabic)	fl. 651/652 (AH 31)		Repulsed an Arab invasion in the Second Battle of Dongola and (traditionally) established the Baqt
Zacharias	ⲍⲁⲭⲁⲣⲓⲁⲥ (Zakharias) (Old Nubian)	651 or 653	696	Son of Qalidurut
Merkurios	ⲙⲉⲣⲕⲟⲩⲣⲓⲟⲥ (Merkourios)	697	c. 722	United rule over Makuria and Nobadia; called "a New Constantine", implying major ecclesiastical decisions
Zacharias I	ⲍⲁⲭⲁⲣⲓⲁⲥ (Zakharias)	c. 722	c. 722	Son of Merkurios; abdicated for a religious life, probably quickly
Simon	ⲥⲓⲙⲱⲛ or ⲥⲩⲙⲉⲱⲛ (Simōn or Symeōn)	c. 722	Mid-8th century	Relative selected and possibly adopted by Zacharias
Abraham	ⲁⲃⲣⲁⲁⲙ or ⲁⲃⲣⲁϩⲁⲙ (Abraam or Abraham)	Mid-8th century		Courtier adopted by Zacharias; feuded with bishop of Dongola, threatening to return kingdom to paganism during the papacy of Michael I (r. 743–767); deposed by Zacharias and exiled to an island in the Nile
Markos	ⲙⲁⲣⲕⲟⲥ (Markos)	Mid-8th century		Appointed by Zacharias; assassinated by partisans of Abraham in response to an attempt on the prior king's life while in exile
Kyriakos	ⲕⲩⲣⲓⲁⲕⲟⲥ (Kyriakos)	c. 747	768	Invaded Umayyad Egypt c. 748 in support of the imprisoned Coptic pope Michael I, securing his release before the fall of the Caliphate to the Abbasids
...
Chaël	ⲭⲁⲏⲗ (Khaēl)	c. 785 – c. 794	804–813	
...
Ioannes	ⲓⲱⲁⲛⲛⲏⲥ or ⲓⲱϩⲁⲛⲛⲏⲥ (Iōannēs or Iōhannēs)	c. 800	c. 820	Reneged on the baqt payments
Zakharias III	ⲍⲁⲭⲁⲣⲓⲁⲥ (Zakharias)	c. 835	856/859/866	Son of Ioannes; dealt with civil war; sent son Georgios to Baghdad to reduce annual baqt payments to smaller triennial levies
Georgios I	ⲅⲉⲱⲣⲅⲓⲟⲥ (Geōrgios)	c. 856	c. 887	Son of Zakharias III
Zakharias IV	ⲍⲁⲭⲁⲣⲓⲁⲥ (Zakharias)	916/917	930	Son of Georgios I
Kabil		c. 943		'Kabil' was separately recorded as the title of the Nubian kings by a late-9th century Arabic report under Ahmad ibn Tulun in Tulunid Egypt
Georgios II	ⲅⲉⲱⲣⲅⲓⲟⲥ (Geōrgios)	969	c. 1002	
Raphael	ⲣⲁⲫⲁⲏⲗ (Raphaēl)	1000	c. 1006	
Stephanos	ⲥⲧⲉⲫⲁⲛⲟⲥ (Stephanos)	c. 1027		
Solomon		1077	1079/1080	Supposedly restored matrilineal succession
Georgios III	ⲅⲉⲱⲣⲅⲓⲟⲥ (Geōrgios)	c. 1079/1080		
Basil		c. 1089		
Georgios V	ⲅⲉⲱⲣⲅⲓⲟⲥ (Geōrgios)	1130	1158	Son of Basileios
Moses	ⲙⲟⲩⲥⲏⲥ (Mousēs or Mousis)	1155	1199	Nephew of Georgios V, often mistakenly titled Moses Georgios; raided Ayyubid Egypt, sacking Aswan in 1171; subsequently raided by the Ayyubids, devastating Lower Nubia; may have abdicated to pursue a pilgrimage to Constantinople, Rome, and Jerusalem
Georgios VI	ⲅⲉⲱⲣⲅⲓⲟⲥ (Geōrgios)			Nephew of Moses
Basil II				Brother of Georgios VI
Murtashkara		c. 1268/9		
David		1268/9	4 June 1276	Nephew of Murtashkara; usurped Murtashkara and banished his sons to Al-Abwab, the independent former northern province of Alodia; vassal of Baybars, sultan of Mamluk Egypt
Mashkouda		4 June 1276	c. 1279	
Barak		c. 1279		
Simamon		c. 1286		
Nephew of Semamun		1287/1288	1288	
Simamon		c. 1288	c. 1289	
Nephew of David (Budamma)		c. 1289	c. 1290	
Simamon		c. 1290	1295	
Ayay		c. 1304/5	1311	Also known as Amai; brother of King David
Kudanbes	ⲕⲟⲩⲇⲁⲛⲡⲉⲥ or ⲕⲟⲩⲇⲁⲛⲡⲉⲥⲁ (Koudanpes or Koudanpesa)	1311	1316	Also known as Karanbas; brother of King David & Ayay, whom he usurped; vassal of An-Nasir Muhammad, sultan of Mamluk Egypt; usurped in turn, attempting to flee to Al-Abwab but returned to the Mamluks; later retook power
Abdallah Barshanbu		1316	1317	First Muslim king, an Islamic convert nephew of David or pretender installed by An-Nasir Muhammad
Abram	ⲁⲃⲣⲁⲙ (Abram)	Late 1317 or early 1318		Ruled only three days
Kanz ad-Dawla Muhammad	كنز الدولة محمد (Kanz ad-Dawla Muḥammad)	1318	1323	Muslim nephew of Kudanbes and ruler of the Banu Kanz tribe, whose Fatimid fiefs had been revoked by the Ayyubids, causing them to occupy areas of Lower Nubia; imprisoned by the Mamluks during Barshanbu's rule
Kudanbes	ⲕⲟⲩⲇⲛⲡⲉⲥ or ⲕⲟⲩⲇⲛⲡⲉⲥⲁ (Koudanpes or Koudanpesa)	1323	1324	Restored amid 2 Mamluk expeditions against Banu Kanz rule in Nubia
Kanz ad-Dawla Muhammad	كنز الدولة محمد (Kanz ad-Dawla Muḥammad)	1324	c. 1328	Restored
Siti	ⲥⲓⲧⲓ (Siti)	c. 1331	1333	Restored Christianity
Paper (king)	ⲡⲁⲡⲉⲣ (Paper)	c. 14th century		King of Dongola (Tungul)
Nasir		c. 1397		Mamluk Vassal, last ruler of Makuria around Dongola
Joel	ⲓⲱⲏⲗ (Iōēl)	c. 1484		"King of Dotawo" (i.e. Makuria) relocated to Daw or Atwa (Gebel Adda)
Gaua		c. 1520	c. 1526	"Queen of Dotawo"
King Qasqash		c. 17th century		Last known ruler of Makuria around Dongola during the Funj period, previously dismissed by historians as a semi-legendary figure known only through 19th-century folklore and religious [[hagiography]], in March 2026, archaeologists confirmed the historical existence of King Qasqash (also spelled Qashqash)

== See also ==
- Makuria
- Nubia
