= Abraham of Makuria =

Ruler of the Nubian kingdom of Makuria

Abraham (Old Nubian: ⲁⲃⲣⲁⲁⲙ or ⲁⲃⲣⲁϩⲁⲙ, Abraam or Abraham) was king of Makuria in Nubia during the mid-8th century.

== Life ==
According to the History of the Patriarchs of Alexandria, Abraham was a "valiant youth" who was "attached to the palace" when King Simon died. Simon's predecessor Zakharias then adopted Abraham as his son and selected him as the next king. Abraham, however, feuded with Bishop Cyriacus or Kyriakos of Dongola and demanded his replacement by another cleric named John or Ioannes. He sent Cyriacus to Pope Michael I in Alexandria, who convened a synod to try him for the various offenses complained of by Abraham. The author of the history claims Abraham's letters were "full of false testimonies" but—with Abraham threatening the church with returning his kingdom to paganism—the synod acquiesced to his demands and deposed the bishop. A supposed miracle led to Cyriacus being permitted to return to Makuria, but he settled in a monastery rather than resuming his prior office. The ecclesiastical history claims that no rain fell in Makuria for the remaining 24 years of the former bishop's life, that "every year" the people endured "a pestilence", and that those who had borne false witness against Cyriacus were "suddenly struck blind".

Throughout this, Zakharias had been living in religious seclusion but, learning what had happened, he secured Abraham's deposition and exiled him to an island in the middle of the Nile. Markos was selected as the next king but—apparently shortly after his ascension—his partisans conspired to initiate an attack on Abraham on his island. Abraham's own supporters learned of this plot before it could happen and slew Markos while he prayed in church. Abraham was not restored, however, and Kyriakos—a different one from the bishop—ascended as the new king.

== See also ==
- Kings of Makuria

Preceded by Simon	King of Makuria	Succeeded by Markos
