= Simon of Makuria =

Simon (Old Nubian: ⲥⲓⲙⲱⲛ or ⲥⲩⲙⲉⲱⲛ; Simōn or Symēon; 8th century) was king of Makuria in Nubia, now northern Sudan.

== Life ==
According to the History of the Patriarchs of Alexandria, Zacharias was appointed to succeed his father Merkurios as king but declined to allow greater focus on his religious devotion. Instead, he appointed "a kinsman" Simon to serve instead. According to local tradition, it was more common for the king's sister's son, his nephew, to succeed to leadership positions. The length and events of Simon's reign pass unmentioned, but he was succeeded by the "valiant youth" and courtier Abraham, who was adopted by Zacharias. (Zacharias may have adopted Simon as well, as the history notes "Zacharias had been father of the kings up to this time" when Abraham was deposed.)

== See also ==
- Makuria
- List of Makurian kings

Preceded by Zacharias I	King of Makuria	Succeeded by Abraham
