= Moses (bishop of Awsim) =

Coptic religious figure

Moses, also called Abba Musa, was the Coptic bishop of Awsīm (or Wasīm) in Giza from about 735 until after 767. He was an influential churchman in Islamic Egypt.

Moses was a monk before he became a bishop. His predecessor, Gamul, was bishop about 728 and Moses had succeeded by about 735. He was a companion of the Patriarch Michael I. When in 743 there was a deadlock between northern and southern factions in the election of a new Patriarch of Alexandria, Moses successfully put forward Michael as a compromise. His influence probably stemmed in part from his proximity to the Egyptian government in Fustat.

Moses was repeatedly imprisoned for refusing to pay new taxes imposed on ecclesiastical landholdings. During the revolt against Umayyad rule (747–750), Moses (by now an old man) and Michael were both summoned before the Umayyad caliph Marwan II. According to John the Deacon, Moses was severely beaten, yet gave thanks to God that he was found worthy to suffer for the church. John, who wrote the second section of the History of the Patriarchs of Alexandria, was a spiritual disciple of Moses.

Moses defended the Coptic church against the encroachments of the Muslim rulers of Egypt. Under the Abbasids who replaced the Umayyads in 750, Moses visited Fustat several times to plead for tax relief for church lands. He secured lenient treatment for the Copts from the Abbasid governor Abū ʿAwn when, at the governor's request, he interceded with prayer and the waters of the Nile rose three cubits. Late in Michael's patriarchate, Moses succeeded in bring back into the church some Melitians, remnants of a 4th-century schism. Under Patriarch Mina I (767–774), Moses fought to keep Christian holy places. He also wrote a letter to Mina and all the Christians of Alexandria urging them to continue keeping the Lord's Day.

Moses was revered in his own time as a healer with the gift of prophecy who comforted his fellow inmates during his spells in prison. He worked to keep the peace between the Copts and the Melkites in Alexandria.
