= Kyriakos of Makuria =

8th-century king of Makuria

Kyriakos or Cyriacus (Old Nubian: ⲕⲩⲣⲓⲁⲕⲟⲥ, Kyriakos; fl. c. 748) was a king of Makuria in Nubia in the mid-8th century.

== Dating ==
Although the History of the Patriarchs of Alexandria places Kyriakos's reign after Markos and during the late pontificate of Michael I of Alexandria (r. 743–767), other authorities place it between Merkurios and his son Zacharias I. If so, following the usual matrilineal succession of the Nubians, Kyriakos might have been Merkurios's nephew by a sister.

== Life ==
In the History of the Patriarchs of Alexandria, Kyriakos succeeded to the throne after King Markos was assassinated by partisans of his predecessor Abraham while praying in church. As the abdicated king Zacharias is not mentioned in relation to his ascension (as he was for the previous three kings), Zacharias may have died during the conflict.

The principal event of Kyriakos's reign was his invasion of Umayyad Egypt in support of the jailed pope of Alexandria Michael I. This likely occurred around 748, (Note: Budge provided two other dates for the Nubian expedition to Egypt, 722 and 737. Neither is possible, as both precede Michael I's pontificate.) during a Coptic revolt against Arab taxation and immediately proceeding the loss of Egypt to the Abbasids in 750. Kyriakos's army was said to have numbered 100,000 men. Although this figure is highly unlikely (unless including the rebelling Copts) and the invasion a violation of the Nubians and Arabs' long-standing truce known as the Baqt, Kyriakos reached as far as Fustat (medieval Cairo) and achieved his aims. The Umayyad governor Abd al-Malik ibn Marwan ibn Musa ibn Nusayr released Michael I and Kyriakos's imprisoned envoy, sending the latter back to the Nubians to ask them to return to Makuria in peace.

== See also ==
- Makuria
- Kings of Makuria
- Military history of Sudan

== Notes ==
Preceded by Markos	King of Makuria	Succeeded by Khael
