= Zacharias I of Makuria =

Zacharias I
- King of Makuria
- Predecessor: Merkurios
- Successor: Simon
- Born: Dongola
- Religion: Coptic Orthodox Christianity

Zacharias I (Old Nubian: ⲍⲁⲭⲁⲣⲓⲁⲥ, Zakharias; fl. c. 722) was a ruler of the Nubian kingdom of Makuria.

== Life ==
According to the History of the Patriarchs of Alexandria, Zacharias was the son and designated heir of his predecessor, Merkurios, but declined to rule, retiring to a life of religious seclusion. Instead, he appointed as king "a kinsman of his named Simon". It had been the region's usual custom for a ruler to be succeeded by his sister's son matrilinearly. When Simon died, Zacharias then appointed a courtier and "valiant youth", Abraham, to replace him and adopted him as a son for this purpose. When Abraham fell into a protracted feud with the Dongolan bishop and threatened Pope Michael I of Alexandria (r. 743–767) with returning the kingdom to paganism, Zacharias deposed Abraham and exiled him to one of the islands in the Nile River. (As Zacharias was said to have "been father of the kings up to this time", he may have earlier adopted Simon as well.) Zacharias subsequently named Markos as king but, as he passes unmentioned during the ascension of Markos's heir Kyriakos, he may have died before that occasion.

== See also ==
- Kings of Makuria
- Makuria

Preceded by Merkurios	King of Makuria	Succeeded by Simon
