= Pope Abraham of Alexandria =

Head of the Coptic Church from 975 to 978

Saint Abraham of Alexandria
- Pope of Alexandria and Patriarch of the See of St. Mark
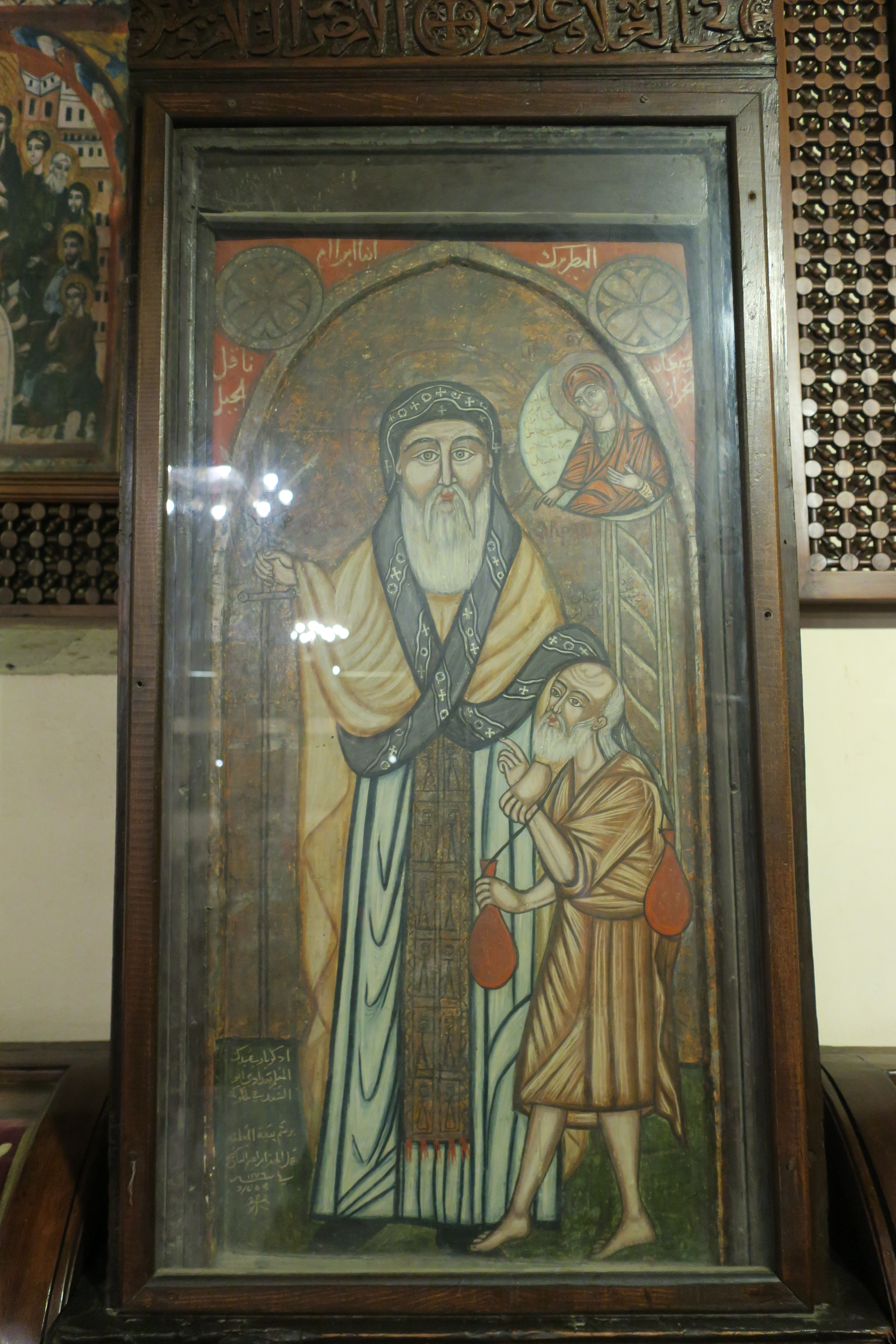
- Icon of pope St.Abraham in the Hanging church
- Papacy began: 975
- Papacy ended: 3 December 979
- Predecessor: Mina II
- Successor: Philotheos

Personal details
- Born: Ebn-Zaraa Syria
- Died: 3 December 979
- Buried: The Hanging Church
- Denomination: Coptic Orthodox Christian
- Residence: Saint Mark's Church

Sainthood
- Feast day: 3 December (6 Kiahk in the Coptic calendar)

Pope Abraham of Alexandria was the 62nd Pope of Alexandria and Patriarch of the See of St. Mark. He is considered a saint by the Coptic Orthodox Church. He is also referred to as Efrem or Ephrem.

== Early life ==
Abraham was Syriac by birth. He was a wealthy merchant who visited Egypt several times, and finally stayed there, residing in Alexandria. He was known for his goodness, devoutness, and love of the poor. After his ordination, he distributed half of his wealth to the needy and used the other half for building pools throughout Egypt, including the pool of Saint Mercurius Church in Coptic Cairo.

== Election ==
During the reign of Al-Muizz – who was the first Fatimid ruler of Egypt – the Islamic government was ambivalent in its treatment of the Copts, alternating sympathy and abuse with atrocity and brutality. At that time, St. Mark's Seat had been vacant for about two years. Finally the bishops and Coptic community leaders assembled in the Church of St. Serguis and Bacchus in Cairo in order to choose possible candidates. While they were convening, Abraham the Syrian, a man devoted to religion and piety, entered the church. One of the assembled turned to a bishop and said that if the bishop were looking for a candidate for the patriarchate, God had sent them a candidate. The whole group assembled was impressed by the selection, and they unanimously decided to elect him. They then took the protesting Abraham in iron fetters to Alexandria, where he was consecrated as the 62nd Patriarch of Alexandria.

== Patriarchate ==
Immediately upon taking office, Abraham suppressed the practice of simony which had become a significant problem during the last several patriarchates. He then turned his attention to the often degraded morals of the church archons, who frequently kept concubines as well as their legal wives. He went so far as to threaten anyone continuing to violate the sanctity of marriage with excommunication.

== Death ==
Pope Abraham the Syriac died on 3 December 979 A.D.

== See also ==
- Saint Simon the Tanner
- Al-Muizz Lideenillah

Preceded by Pope Mina II of Alexandria	Coptic Pope; 975–978	Succeeded by Pope Philotheos of Alexandria
