= Pope John IV of Alexandria =

Head of the Coptic Church from 777 to 799

Saint John IV of Alexandria
- Pope of Alexandria & Patriarch of the See of St. Mark
- Papacy began: 24 January 777
- Papacy ended: 24 January 799
- Predecessor: Mina I
- Successor: Mark II

Personal details
- Born: 24 January Egypt
- Died: 24 January 799 Egypt
- Buried: Saint Mark's Church
- Denomination: Coptic Orthodox Christian
- Residence: Saint Mark's Church

Sainthood
- Feast day: 24 January (16 Toba in the Coptic calendar)

Pope John IV of Alexandria was the 48th Pope of Alexandria and Patriarch of the See of St. Mark from 777 to 799.

He became a monk in St. Macarius Monastery. He persevered in intense worship and was reputed for his ascetic life. He was chosen by Pope Michael, 46th Pope of Alexandria and ordained a priest for the Church of St. Mina. Pope Michael entrusted him to manage the affairs of the church and to lead the people and direct all its property and offerings. He excelled in his duties.

When Anba Mina, 47th Pope of Alexandria, departed, the bishops, the priests, and the scholars of the City of Alexandria gathered and nominated several monks. They wrote the name of each of them on a piece of paper, and the name of Father John was among them. The bishops prayed and celebrated the Divine Liturgy for three days. Then, on the third day, they brought a child to draw one of the names. They found it to be the name of this saint, Father John. They returned the paper, mixed it with the other papers, and brought another child, who drew the same paper. This was repeated a third time. They were sure that the Lord had chosen Fr. John to become the next pope. They took him and ordained him patriarch in 777 A.D. He shepherded his flock well. He always preached the people confirming them in the Orthodox faith. He was also merciful to the poor and the needy.

During his days, there was a famine, to the point that one measure of grain (a Bushel) was sold for two Dinari. Many poor from different beliefs gathered every day at his door. He delegated to his disciple Mark to use the money of the churches to feed the poor and satisfy their needs. He offered to everyone without distinction of faith until God removed this famine.

Anba John was dedicated to building many churches. When the time of his departure drew near, he called on the priests and said to them, "On the 16th of Tubah, I was born and was also ordained Pope, and on this day also I will depart from this world." When the bishops and the priests heard this, they wept and said, "Who would become our Father after you?" He said to them, "The Lord Jesus Christ has chosen my disciple Fr. Mark to this rank."

Religious titles
Preceded by Pope Mina I	Coptic Pope; 777–799	Succeeded by Pope Mark II
