= Simamon of Makuria =

Simamon

King of Makuria
- Reign: c. 1286
- Predecessor: Barak
Names
- Georgios Symôn ⲅⲉⲱⲣⲅⲓⲟⲩ ⲥⲩⲙⲟⲛ
- Religion: Coptic Orthodox Christianity

Simamon (Old Nubian: ⲥⲓⲙⲁⲙ̄ⲱⲛ, Simamôn) was a king of the Nubian kingdom of Makuria that ruled about 1286.

Simamon ruled in the late 13th century, shortly after the Mamluk Sultanate invaded Makuria, deposed its king David and turned Makuria into a puppet state. Simamon's mother was a woman called Ashilla, his father remains unknown. According to Ibn Abd al-Zahir he succeeded a certain Barak, who was murdered by the Mamluks in or shortly after 1279. Simamon may have been king of Makuria as early as 1280, as a fragmentary document from Qasr Ibrim dated to that year mentions him and his mother. He ruled for certain by 1286, when he is mentioned in another document from Qasr Ibrim discussing a land sale. According to al-Zahir Simamon was deposed in late 1287, yet another source, Al-Nuwayri, claims that Simamon ruled until about 1295.

== See also ==
- List of rulers of Makuria
