= Georgios II of Makuria =

King of Makuria
- Reign: 887–915/920
- Predecessor: Georgios I
- Successor: Zacharias II
- Born: Before 887
- Died: 915/920?
- Spouse: Mariam
- Dynasty: Dynasty of Zacharias
- Father: Georgios I
- Mother: Unknown
- Religion: Coptic Orthodox

Georgios II (before 887–915/920?) was a ruler of the medieval Nubian kingdom of Makuria. He ascended the throne in 887, after the death of his father Georgios I, and ruled until 915 or 920, when he was succeeded by his son Zacharias II. Belonging to the Dynasty of Zacharias, little is known about his rule, although it is recorded that at some point between 910 and 915, his kingdom was involved in a war with the Abbasid Caliphate.

== Life and reign ==
Georgios II lived during the Makurian golden age between the 9th and 11th centuries, when the kingdom reached the peak of its cultural development. He has previously been assumed to have been identical with Georgios I, but it is now clear that he was a king of his own. Georgios II was probably born after the early 860s. He was the grandson of Zacharias I, who, in 835, had founded a new Makurian dynasty, and the son of Georgios I, who had famously travelled to Baghdad in the same year. He also had a sister whose name has not been reserved in the records, who was married to Nyuti (nephew of Zacharias I), and a younger brother named Zacharias.

The sources for the reign of Georgios II are limited. What is known is that he became king in 887, after the death of his father. He was married to a woman named Mariam, who bore him a son and eventual successor, Zacharias II. Zacharias II was already consolidating his power during the rule of his father, holding the highest offices of the kingdom (protoeparch and protodomestikos).

Late in Georgios' reign, between 910 and 915, Nubia was reportedly raided by the Abbasid Emir of Egypt, Takin al-Khazari. It is not entirely clear when Georgios' rule came to an end: a document from Qasr Ibrim suggests that he was succeeded by his son in 915, while a foundation stele from Faras places that event in the year 920.

== Notes ==
Preceded by Georgios I	King of Makuria	Succeeded by Zacharias II
