= Siti (king) =

King of the Nubian kingdom of Makuria

- King
- Reign: c. 1331–after 1333
- Predecessor: Kanz ad-Dawla Muhammad
- Religion: Coptic Orthodox Christianity

Siti (Old Nubian: ⲥⲓⲧⲓ) was king of the Nubian kingdom of Makuria from about 1331 to at least December 1333. Contrary to many of his predecessors in the late 13th and early 14th century he is only known from Old Nubian sources, which are: two documents found at Edfu and Qasr Ibrim respectively, four inscriptions from Banganarti, a graffito in Gebel Abu Negila in northern Kordofan and a dipinto from Sonqi Tino. It seems that he wrestled control from the Muslim Kanz ad-Dawla Muhammad, who ruled at least until 1328, and restored Makuria as a Christian kingdom.

== See also ==
- List of rulers of Makuria
