= Bashmur =

Region in the Nile Delta in Egypt

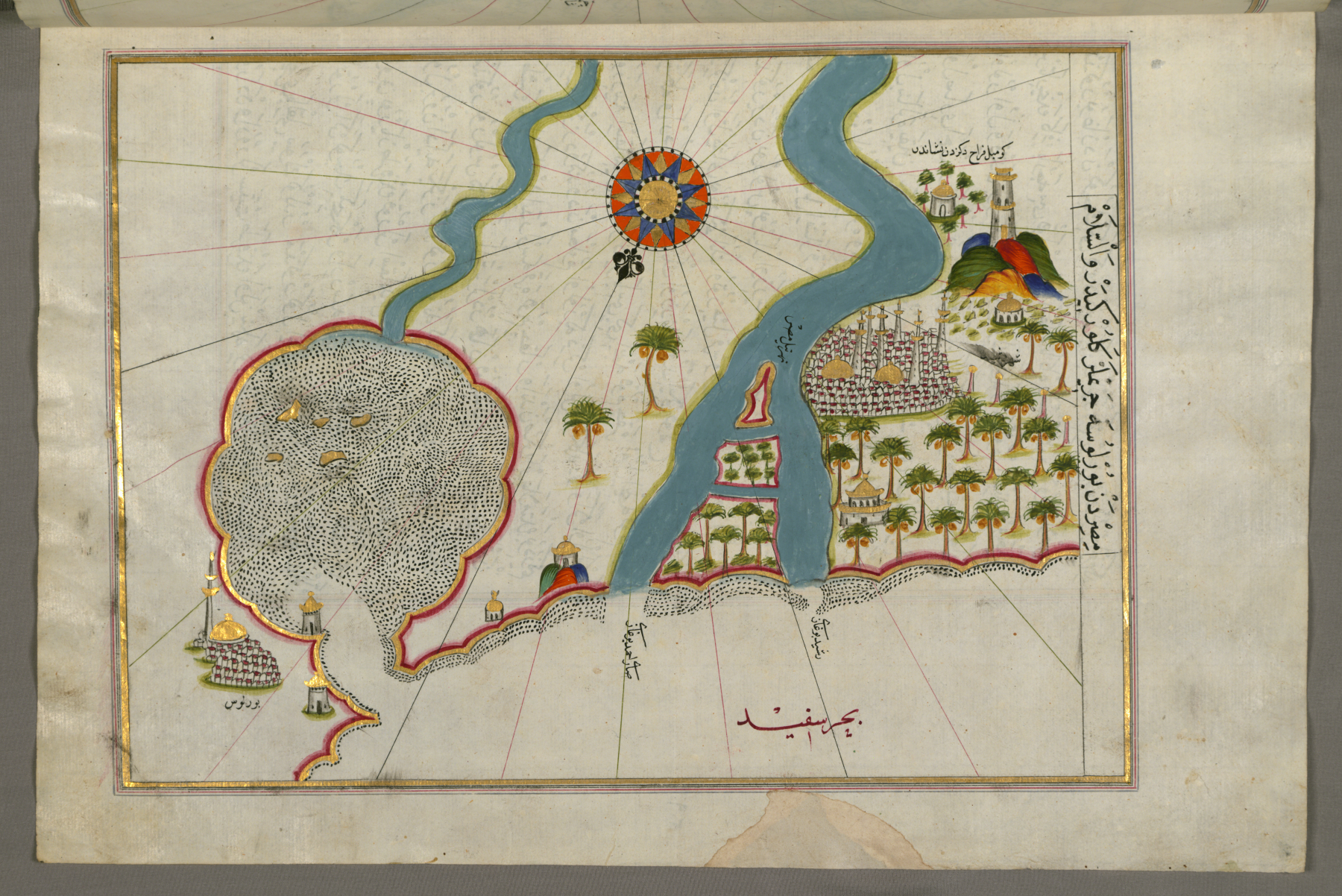
Map of an area comprising Bashmur on the map of Piri Reis

Bashmur (Arabic: الباشمور, Egyptian Arabic: [elbɑʃˈmuːɾ]) was a region in the Nile Delta in Egypt. In the early Middle Ages, it was inhabited by Copts (Egyptians) and was the scene of a series of revolts against Arab occupation in the 8th and 9th centuries.

== Name ==
Louis Picques, a late-17th century scholar, suggested that the name Bashmur could be derived from Psamer (Coptic: ⲡⲥⲁⲙⲏⲣ), which he interpreted as "at the borders or boundaries of a region," or Psamour (Coptic: ⲡⲥⲁⲙⲟⲩⲣ, "opposite of Moeris"). Thomas Edwards provided another explanation, suggesting that it could be linked to a Semitic term for "north" (Arabic: شمالي, romanized: šamālī, Hebrew: שמאל, romanized: s'mól). This word is also found in Coptic as a hapax (Coptic: ϣⲙⲟⲩⲗ, lit. 'north').

The name could be also an outcome of Ptimyris (Ancient Greek: Πτιμυρις), the ancient name of the Delta, which could represent an elliptical Coptic expression Pčimour (Coptic: ⲡϭⲓⲙⲟⲩⲣ), for pi-Kahi Etčimour (Coptic: ⲡⲓⲕⲁϩⲓ ⲉⲧϭⲓⲙⲟⲩⲣ, lit. 'enclosed land').

== Location ==
The boundaries of Bashmur have not been constant throughout the centuries. Perhaps from the mid-eighth to the mid-ninth century, Bashmur encompassed the entire marsh region northeast of Fuwwah (Coptic: ⲃⲟⲩⲁ) extending as far to the east as just north of Dekernes. Later it may have been limited to the eastern part of this area. In the 10th century, Ibn Hawqal equated the lake of Nastaruh (Lake Burullus) with the lake of Bashmur. In the 14th century, Abu al-Fida located Bashmur in the northeast of the Delta between Damietta and Ashmun El Rumman.

The name Bashmur survives in this region as the name of a Nile canal that breaks off about 4.5 miles (7 km) east of Mansoura, Egypt by El Salamun and runs through the area between the Damietta arm of the Nile and Dekernes before emptying into the El Sirw canal some 3.5 miles (5.5 km) south of Dakahlia.

== Society and economy ==
Bashmur was a region of marshland with sand banks and dense cover of reeds. Nowhere else in Egypt was more propitious for armed rebellion. Access to inhabited places was provided through narrow sandy banks and the reeds provided cover for soldiers. Moreover, Arabs did not settle in the Bashmur, leaving the population religiously unmixed. The economy of the region also favoured the Bashmurians, who relied on limited agriculture, fishing and hunting birds for food. Less dependent on irrigation works than the Bashmurians Farmers, they were capable of resisting long sieges. The Bashmurians also sold papyrus and possibly raised cattle.

== See also ==
- Bashmurian revolts

== Bibliography ==
- Dunn, Michael Collins (1975). The Struggle for ʿAbbāsid Egypt (PhD diss.). Georgetown University.
- Feder, Frank (2017). "The Bashmurite Revolts in the Delta and the 'Bashmuric Dialect'". In Gawdat Gabra; Hany N. Takla (eds.). Christianity and Monasticism in Northern Egypt: Beni Suef, Giza, Cairo, and the Nile Delta. American University in Cairo Press. pp. 33–36.
- Gabra, Gawdat (2003). "The Revolts of the Bashmuric Copts in the Eighth and Ninth Centuries". In W. Beltz (ed.). Die koptische Kirche in den ersten drei islamischen Jahrhunderten. Institut für Orientalistik, Martin-Luther-Universität. pp. 111–119. Archived from the original on 2020-03-22.
- Maspero, J., and G. Wiet (1914-1919). Matériaux pour servir à la géographie de l'Egypte. Cairo.
- Megally, Mounir (1991). "Bashmuric Revolts". In Aziz Suryal Atiya (ed.). The Coptic Encyclopedia. Vol. 2. New York: Macmillan Publishers. cols. 349b–351b.
- Timm, S. (1984) Das christlich-koptische Ägypten in arabischer Zeit, Vol. 1, pp. 354-56. Wiesbaden.
