= Raphael of Makuria =

Raphael
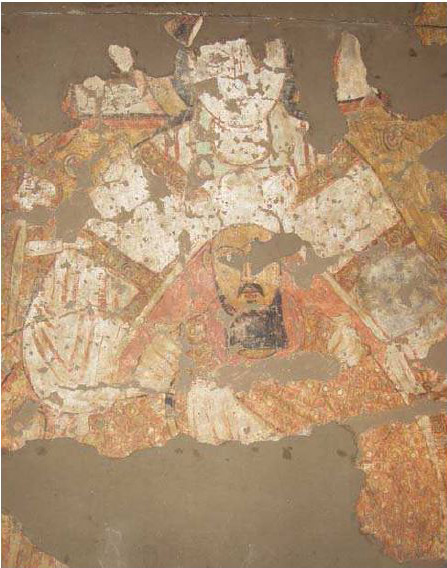

King of Makuria
- Religion: Coptic Orthodox

Raphael (Old Nubian: ⲣⲁⲫⲁⲏⲗ, Raphaēl or Raphail; c. 1002) was a king of the Nubian kingdom of Makuria.

== Life ==
Contemporary writers, such as Abu al-Makarim in a work attributed to Abu Salih the Armenian, record that he constructed a palace with several domes built of red brick in Makuria's capital city Dongola around 1002, which excavations have yet to identify.

Preceded by Simeon	King of Makuria	Succeeded by Georgios III
