= Christian Friedrich Seybold =

German orientalist (1859–1921)

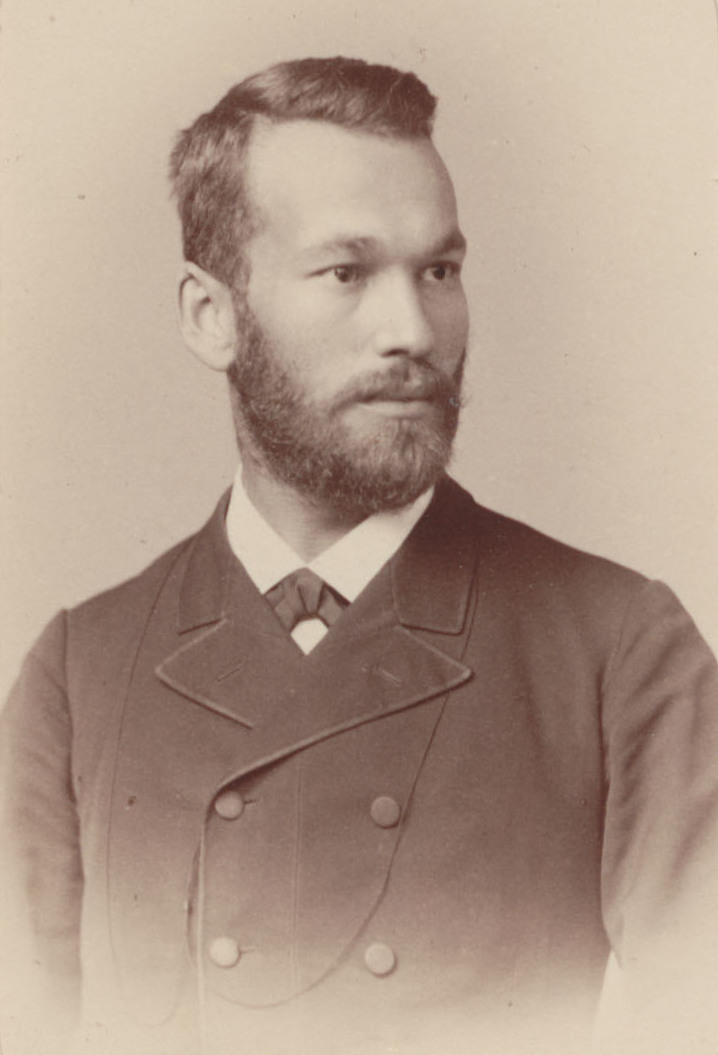
Seybold (1894), by Hermann Brandseph

Christian Friedrich Seybold (6 January 1859 – 27 January 1921) was a German scholar of Oriental languages and professor at the University of Tübingen. He is known for his work on Arabic manuscripts and for collaborating with Pedro II of Brazil on publications related to the Guarani language.

== Life and work ==
Postcard (1915) to Christiaan Snouck Hurgronje

Christian Friedrich Seybold was born on 6 January 1859 in Waiblingen in the Remstal valley of Württemberg, the son of master cooper Daniel Seybold and his wife Katharina, née Böhringer. After successfully passing the state examination, he attended the Protestant seminaries in Maulbronn and Blaubeuren and entered the Protestant seminary in Tübingen in 1878. There he studied theology and Oriental languages. Seybold studied theology at the Evangelical Stift in Tübingen from 1877 to 1883. His coursework included Arabic, Sanskrit, Vedic literature, the Avesta, biblical studies, church history, philosophy, political economy, and comparative religion under scholars including Albert Socin, Rudolf von Roth, Eberhard Nestle, Christoph von Sigwart, Emil Kautzsch, and Carl Heinrich Weizsäcker.

Coursework record of Christian Friederich Seybold at Tübingen University

In 1883, he received his doctorate and passed his first theological examination. He then spent several months in Spain studying Arabic manuscripts and subsequently worked as a tutor in Heilbronn and Maulbronn until 1886.

== In Brazil ==
Through the mediation of the indologist Albrecht Weber, Seybold was informed of an opportunity for employment in Brazil with Brazilian Emperor Pedro II. Pedro sought a German tutor who could assist him in studying literature in various languages, including Arabic, Sanskrit, and Greek, among others. On 2 June 1887, he travelled to Brazil on board the Gironde with Pedro and his entourage. (Note: "Bordo do Gironde 2 de julho de 1887 ... Há 500 passageiros entre os quais o Seibold com quem continuarei meu estudo de sânscrito, árabe e grego." [Aboard the Gironde, 2 July 1887. There are 500 passengers, among them Seybold, with whom I will continue my studies of Sanskrit, Arabic, and Greek.]) As private language tutor (Sprachlehrer), Seybold would also accompany the emperor on extensive travels abroad, and remained with him until the emperor's death, even accompanying him in exile to France. In the last years of the emperor's life, Seybold was a frequent companion, being mentioned hundreds of times in his diaries. (Note: Table 1: Number of references to the orientalist Seybold in the diary of the monarch Pedro II” (Portuguese: Quantidade de citações ao orientalista Seybold no diário do monarca Pedro II): 18 references (30 June–31 December 1887); 40 references (1 January–4 May 1888); 2 references (6 November–31 December 1889); 276 references (1 January–31 December 1890); 443 references (1 January–1 December 1891); total: 779.)

=== Guaraní studies ===
Seybold became quite involved in the study of the indigenous Guarani language of Brazil, a topic of particular interest to Pedro. He compiled a Spanish-language overview of Antonio Ruiz de Montoya's Arte (Grammar) of Guaraní in 1890, and later (1892) a full re-edition of the same work. The volume he worked from was exceedingly rare, the only known exemplar in Europe; having been acquired through Pedro's influence from German bibliophile Julius Platzmann, who had bought it from Alphonse Pinart. (Note: Libri rarissimi exemplar quo usus sum (132+256 pag. 4°)Princeps Illustrissimus munifico in Beatissimi Imperatoris memoriam dono nuper ex manibus et bibliotheca clarissimi Doctoris Julii Platzmann Lipsiensis acquisivit, qui ipse illud summo quondam pretio emerat a viro celeberrimo Alphonso Pinart Parisiensi: videtur esse exemplar illud descriptum a doctissimo Leclerc (Bibliotheca Americana, N. 2248); alterum ejusdem libri exemplar quod praeterea notum est paululum mutilatum commemoravi in Praefatione libri Breve Noticia de la lengua Guarani p. VII; est ex libris Doctoris illustrissimi Couto de Magalhaes Brasiiiensis. [The very rare copy of the book which I have used (132+256 pag. 4°) was recently acquired by the most illustrious Prince as a generous gift in memory of the Most Blessed Emperor from the hands and library of the most illustrious Doctor Julius Platzmann of Leipzig, who himself had once purchased it at a very high price from the most illustrious man Alphonse Pinart of Paris: it seems to be the copy described by the most learned Leclerc (American Library, No. 2248); another copy of the same book which is also known, slightly mutilated, I mentioned in the Preface to the book Breve Noticia de la lengua Guarani p. VII; it is from the books of the most illustrious Doctor Couto de Magalhaes of Brazil.]) He also reprinted several colonial-era works, including a Guarani-Spanish dictionary and a longer grammar.

== At Tübingen ==
After the emperor's death, Seybold accepted a lectureship at the University of Tübingen in 1892. He received his habilitation in 1893, became associate professor in 1897, and full professor in 1901. In this later work Seybold focused primarily on the editing and translation of Arabic manuscripts. He also published a catalogue of the Arabic manuscripts in the University of Tübingen library. He succeeded Eberhard Nestle as chair of Oriental Studies from 1901 to 1921.

== Selected publications ==
- Kamāl al-Dīn Abū al-Barakāt ʿAbd al-Raḥmān ibn Muḥammad ibn Abī Saʿīd al-Anbārī (1886). Seybold, Christian Friedrich (ed.). Kitāb Asrār al-ʿarabīya. Leiden: Brill.
- Paulo Restivo (1890). Seybold, Christian Friedrich (ed.). Brevis Linguae Guarani Grammatica Hispanicae. Stuttgart: Kohlhammer.
- Paulo Restivo; Antonio Ruiz de Montoya; Simon Bandini (1892). Linguae guarani grammatica, hispanice. Stuttgart: Kohlhammer.
- Paulo Restivo; Antonio Ruiz de Montoya (1893). Seybold, Christian Friedrich (ed.). Lexicon Hispano-Guaranicum "Vocabulario de la lengua Guarani". Stuttgart: Kohlhammer.
- Jalāl al-Dīn al-Suyūṭī (1894). Seybold, Christian Friedrich (ed.). Kitāb aš-Šamārīḫ fī ʿilm al-tārīkh [The Date Clusters on the Science of Chronology]. Leiden: Brill.
- Ibn al-Athīr (1896). Seybold, Christian Friedrich (ed.). Kitâb al Muraṣṣaʿ. Weimar: Felber.
- Glossarium Latino-Arabicum. Berlin: Felber. 1910.
- Seybold, Christian Friedrich, ed. (1902). Die Drusenschrift: Kitab alnoqat Waldawair [The Book of Points and Circles].
- Seybold, Christian Friedrich, ed. (1902). Geschichte von Sul und Schumul [Story of Sul and Schumul]. Spirgatis.
- Severus ibn al-Muqaffaʿ (1904–1910). Seybold, Christian Friedrich (ed.). Historia Patriarcharum Alexandrinorum. Berytus: Typographeo Catholico.
- Verzeichnis der arabischen Handschriften der Königlichen Universitätsbibliothek Tübingen. Vol. 1. Tübingen. 1907.
- Severus ibn al-Muqaffaʿ (1912). Seybold, Christian Friedrich (ed.). Alexandrinische Patriarchen-Geschichte von S. Marcus bis Michael I, 61–767. Veröffentlichungen der Hamburger Stadtbibliothek. Vol. 3. Hamburg: Gräfe.
- Seybold, Christian Friedrich, ed. (1914). Fleischers Briefe an Hassler [Fleischer's Letters to Hassler]. Tübingen: Mohr.
