= Theophilus II (Coptic patriarch of Alexandria) =

Head of the Coptic Church from 952 to 956

Pope Theophilus II of Alexandria
- Pope of Alexandria and Patriarch of the See of St. Mark
- Papacy began: 952
- Papacy ended: 956
- Predecessor: Macarius I
- Successor: Mina II

Personal details
- Born: Egypt
- Died: 956
- Buried: Thrown into the river
- Denomination: Coptic Orthodox Christian
- Residence: Saint Mark's Church

Pope Theophilus II of Alexandria, also called Theophanes, was the 60th Pope of Alexandria and Patriarch of the See of St. Mark from 952 to 956.

Religious titles
Preceded by Macarius	Coptic Pope; 952–956	Succeeded by Mina II
