= Severus ibn al-Muqaffa =

Egyptian Coptic bishop and historian

- Bishop of Hermopolis Magna
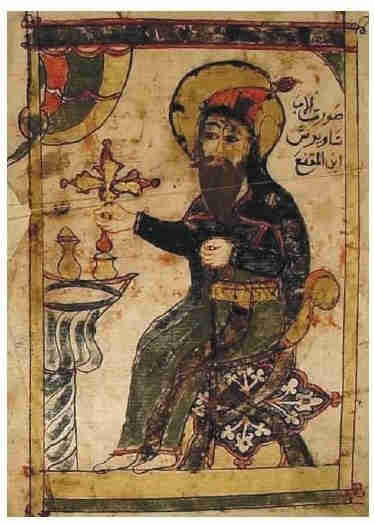
- Native name: سويرس بن المقفع

Personal details
- Died: 987
- Denomination: Coptic Orthodox
- Occupation: Author and historian

Sevērus ibn al-Muqaffaʿ (Arabic: سويرس بن المقفع, romanized: Sawīris ibn al-Muqaffaʿ; died 987) or Severus of Hermopolis or of El Ashmunein (سويرس الأشمونين; Latin: Severus Aschmoniensis) was an Egyptian Coptic Orthodox bishop, author and historian. Severus is sometimes confused with the better-known Abbasid author Abdullah ibn al-Muqaffa' (d. 759).

He was bishop of Hermopolis Magna in Upper Egypt around the end of the tenth century. In this period, Egypt was ruled by the Isma'ili Fatimid Caliphate, which had taken Egypt from the Abbasid Caliphate in 969. Fatimid rule slowly but surely changed Coptic Christian culture, especially in the realm of language. Complaining that the Coptic Orthodox Christians of Egypt no longer knew the Coptic language, Severus composed a theological text in Arabic—the first Coptic text written in that language.

While he was known as the traditional author of the History of the Patriarchs of Alexandria since the 18th century, modern scholarship holds that it was Mawhib ibn Mufarrij of Alexandria (c. 1025—1100) who composed this work. One of the stories in it relates how Bishop Severus was asked by the Muslim chief justice (qadi al-qudat) whether a passing dog was Muslim or Christian. As it was a Friday, the Bishop said to ask the dog by offering it both meat and wine as Muslims do not drink wine and Christians do not eat meat on Fridays.

== Life ==
After a brief period serving the government in Fatimid Egypt, he decided to join a monastery and become a monk. Later, he was ordained bishop of al-Ashminayn by Patriarch Theophane (953-956). He gained prominence for composing many works in defense of Christianity, in addition to his skills as a debater, even within the Fatimid courts under Caliph al-Mu‘izz (969-975), where he defended Christian doctrine. Thus he became the first Coptic author to compose theological works in Arabic. His legacy endures in the Coptic Orthodox Church whose theological and spiritual writings continue to be published in Arabic, like those of Pope Shenouda III.

== Works ==
Some of the most known works by Severus ibn al-Muqaffa are the following (for a list with 26 titles of works by the Author read Abū al-Barakāt, Catalog of Christian Literature in Arabic, which may have some different titles for the works we know presently.) :

- Lamp of the Intellect (in Arabic مصباح العقل)
- History of the Patriarchs of Alexandria (in Arabic تاريخ بطاركة كنيسة الإسكندرية القبطية). This is a compilation begun by Severus Ibn al-Muqaffaʿ and based on earlier biographical sources. It was continued by others including Michael, bishop of Tinnis (11th century, writing in Coptic, covering 880 to 1046), ibn Mufarrij, deacon of Alexandria., and Pope Mark III of Alexandria (for 1131 to 1167).
- Affliction's physic and the cure of sorrow (In Arabic طبّ الغمّ وشفاء الحزن)
- Book of The Precious Pearl, 15 Chapters. A book rich with Biblical and Patristic citations (especially citing the Greek Fathers of The Church, Athanasius, Cyril of Alexandria, Gregory Nazianzen, Gregory of Nyssa, Gregory Thaumaturgus, Epiphanius of Salamis, Chrysostom, Severus of Antioch and Dioscorus of Alexandria). The book has 1161 Biblical citations and at least 191 Patristic citations.

(Full title in Arabic: كتاب الدر الثمين في إيضاح الاعتقاد في الدين بما نطقت به أفواه النبيين والرسل الأطهار المؤيدين والأباء المعلمين والبطاركة المغبوطين علي تجسد رب المجد وصعوده وإرساله الباراقليط).

- The Refutation Of Eutychius, of four parts and also known as The Book On The Councils (Arabic: كتاب المجامع). The book was written mainly to defend the position of the Jacobites who rejected the Council of Chalcedon against what has been brought up by the Melchite Patriarch Eutychius, or Sa'id ibn Bitriq, in his book known as the Annals Of Eutychius.
- The Arrangement of the Priesthood, i.e. Information on Ranks in the Church, (Arabic: ترتيب الكهنوت).
- The Book of Brief Explanation on the Faith, (Arabic: البيان المختصر في الإيمان).
- The Explanation, (Arabic: كتاب الإيضاح, Kitāb al-īḍāḥ), 12 Chapters. The book is sometimes confused with the previously mentioned book of The Precious Pearl.
- Stringing together of Jewel and Pearls, in answer to the doctrine of fate and divine decree (Arabic: نظم الجواهر والدرر ضد القائلين بالقضاء والقدر), Mistakenly-attributed to George Elmacin (ابن المكين).
