= Pope Mina II of Alexandria =

Head of the Coptic Church from 956 to 974

- Pope of Alexandria and Patriarch of the See of St. Mark
- Papacy began: 956
- Papacy ended: 974
- Predecessor: Theophilus II
- Successor: Abraham

Personal details
- Born: Egypt
- Died: 974
- Buried: Mahallat Danyal, Gharbia Governorate, Egypt
- Denomination: Coptic Orthodox Christian
- Residence: Saint Mark's Church

Pope Mina II of Alexandria, also called Menas II, was the 61st Pope of Alexandria and Patriarch of the See of St. Mark from 956 to 974.

Religious titles
Preceded by Theophilus II	Coptic Pope; 956–974	Succeeded by Abraham
