= Merkurios of Makuria =

Merkurios
- King of Makuria
- Reign: 697 - c. 722
- Predecessor: Zacharias
- Successor: Zacharias I
- Born: Dongola
- Religion: Greek Orthodox Christianity (until 710) Coptic Orthodox Christianity (from 710 onwards)

Merkurios or Mercurius (Old Nubian: ⲙⲉⲣⲕⲟⲩⲣⲓⲟⲥ, Merkourios; reigned 697 – c. 722) was ruler of the Nubian kingdom of Makuria. Authorities believe that during his reign Makuria absorbed the kingdom of Nobatia to its north.

== Life ==
According to P.L. Shinnie, an inscription on the foundation stone in Faras, dated to AD 707, marks the eleventh year of Merkurios's reign. In 710, Merkurios erected an inscription at Taifa, which indicates that his kingdom had united with Nobatia by that date. John the Deacon, an Egyptian Christian writing around 768, described Merkurios as a "New Constantine", which Shinnie interprets as evidence that Merkurios played some important role in the Nubian church.
