= Pope Mina I of Alexandria =

Head of the Coptic Church from 767 to 776

- Pope of Alexandria & Patriarch of the See of St. Mark
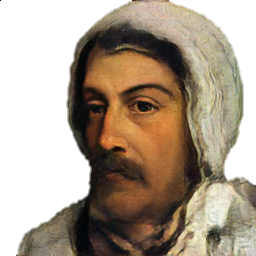
- Papacy began: 767
- Papacy ended: 776
- Predecessor: Michael I
- Successor: John IV

Personal details
- Born: Egypt
- Died: 776
- Buried: Saint Mark's Church
- Denomination: Coptic Orthodox Christian
- Residence: Saint Mark's Church

Pope Mina I of Alexandria, or Menas I, was the 47th Pope of Alexandria and Patriarch of the See of St. Mark from 767 to 776.

Religious titles
| Preceded by Michael I | Coptic Pope; 767–776 | Succeeded by John IV |
