= Pope Michael I of Alexandria =

Head of the Coptic Church from 743 to 767

Saint Michael I of Alexandria
- Pope of Alexandria & Patriarch of the See of St. Mark
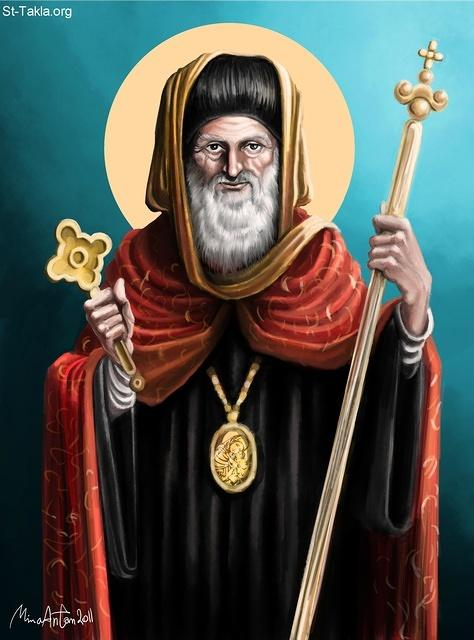
- Papacy began: 14 September 743
- Papacy ended: 12 March 767
- Predecessor: Theodore I
- Successor: Mina I

Personal details
- Born: Egypt
- Died: 12 March 767
- Buried: Saint Mark's Church
- Denomination: Coptic Orthodox Christian
- Residence: Saint Mark's Church

Sainthood
- Feast day: 12 March (16 Baramhat in the Coptic calendar)

Michael I (or Khaʾil I) was the 46th Coptic Pope and Patriarch of Alexandria from 743 to 767.

Bishop Moses of Awsim was instrumental in arranging the election of Michael as patriarch in a compromise between northern and southern factions.

In 748, when Pope Michael was thrown into prison by Abd al-Malik ibn Marwan ibn Musa ibn Nusayr, King Kyriakos of Makuria marched north into Egypt at the head of an army said to number 100,000 men to free the Pope of Alexandria. Once the Makurian army reached Egypt, the Pope was released from prison.

In 749, the governor of Egypt, Hawthara ibn Suhayl, held Michael hostage in Rosetta in an effort to force the rebelling Bashmurites to surrender. They instead sacked the city.

Pope Michael opposed the enthroning of the Bishop Isaac as a Syriac Orthodox Patriarch of Antioch after the death of Iwannis I because he was already the bishop of the eparchy of Harran.

Preceded by Theodoros I	Coptic Pope; 743–767	Succeeded by Mina I
