= History of the Patriarchs of Alexandria =

Historical work of the Coptic Orthodox Church of Alexandria

- Ascribed to: Severus Ibn al-Muqaffaʿ
- Compiled by: Severus or Mawhib ibn Mufarrij
- Language: Coptic
- Subject: Biographies of the Non-Chalcedonian Orthodox patriarchs of Egypt

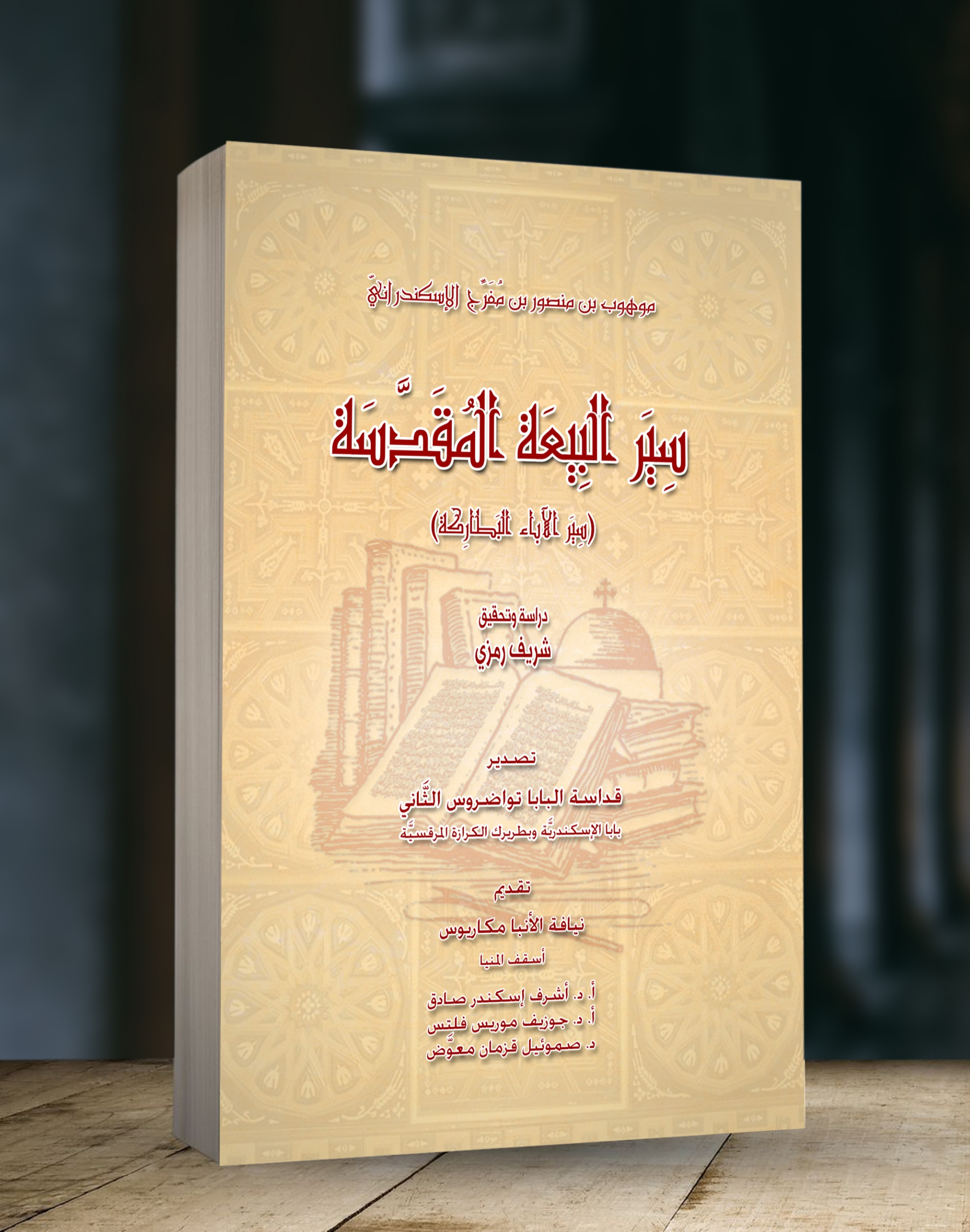

The History of the Patriarchs of Alexandria is a major historical work of the Coptic Orthodox Church of Alexandria. It is the only continuous narrative on the history of the Non-Chalcedonian Alexandrian Patriarchate. It is written in Coptic, but draws extensively on older biographical Greek and Coptic sources. Its compilation is traditionally ascribed to the Coptic bishop of Hermopolis, Severus Ibn al-Muqaffaʿ, up to the 10th century and various contributors afterwards. Modern scholarship instead credits it to Mawhib ibn Mufarrij of Alexandria.

== History ==
The earlier portions of the text are derived mainly from Eusebius and Coptic tradition. But from the 6th century onwards, the biographies grow longer and often seem to derive from documents written by eyewitnesses of the events recorded. The portion on the 6th century history of the Coptic patriarchs, as well as the Muslim conquest of Egypt, the biographies of Pope Benjamin I of Alexandria and his four successors until Pope Simeon I of Alexandria, are recorded by George the Archdeacon in the early eighth century. A vivid eyewitness account of the overthrow of the last Umayyad Caliph, Marwan II, is also included.

The traditional account is that the Coptic bishop of Hermopolis, Severus Ibn al-Muqaffaʿ, began compiling the book in Arabic in the 10th century, relating the famous miracle of moving the Mokattam Mountain during the ruling of the Fatimid Caliph Al-Muizz around 975. It was subsequently continued by others including Michael, bishop of Tinnis (11th century, writing in Coptic, covering 880 to 1046), Mawhub ibn Mansur ibn Mufarrig, deacon of Alexandria, and Pope Mark III of Alexandria (for 1131 to 1167). The complete text has since then been expanded with appendices and continuations running up to 1894. Indeed, one unpublished manuscript continues the text until 1923.

Modern scholarship, however, holds that it was Mawhib ibn Mufarrij of Alexandria (c. 1025—1100) who composed this work.

== Translations ==
In 1713 Eusèbe Renaudot published the Latin translation Historia patriarcharum alexandrinorum jacobitarum. A scholarly Arabic edition was started by Christian Friedrich Seybold (1904).

The first half of the Arabic text was edited and translated into English by Basil Thomas Alfred Evetts under the title History of the Patriarchs of the Coptic Church of Alexandria as part of the Patrologia Orientalis series. This work presents a compilation of the history of the Patriarchs of the Coptic Church of Alexandria. Evetts stopped with the 52nd Patriarch, Joseph, who died in 849. Subsequent material was published and translated by various scholars led by O. H. E. Burmester in Cairo.

== See also ==
- Coptic history
- Coptic Orthodox Church
