= Iris Habib Elmasry =

Egyptian historian (1910–1994)

- إيريس حبيب المصري
- Born: 1910; Egypt
- Died: 2 July 1994 (aged 83–84); Egypt
- Education: B.A. (Education), Maria Grey College, University of London (1932); Research, Dropsie College, Philadelphia (1952–1954); Research at National Gallery, London (1955)
- Occupations: Historian; theologian; educator; politician; writer
- Known for: Her nine-volume *The Story of the Copts*; contributions to Coptic feminine theology; public service to Coptic Church
- Notable work: The Story of the Copts; Introduction to the Coptic Church; The Modern Woman Facing Christ; Women in the Church; The Pharaonic Influence on Modern Coptic Life; Why Did We Forget?; Once Again, the Woman
- Father: Habib Pasha Elmasry (secretary of the General Congregation Council of the Coptic Church)
- Relatives: Two brothers (Amin, Sami); sisters Eva, Soraya, Dora
- Awards: Appointed female delegate to Second Assembly of the World Council of Churches (1954); Secretary for correspondence to WCC under Pope Yousab II; Counselor to young Coptic women under Pope Kyrillos VI; Member of synaxarium committee under Pope Shenouda III

Iris Habib Elmasry (إيريس حبيب المصري) (alternate spellings Iris Habib Elmasri, Iris Habib El-Masri, Iris Habib El-Masry) was a prominent Coptic Historian (1910–1994).

== Biography ==
Iris Habib Elmasry was born into a Coptic family in 1910. Her family name Elmasry in the Arabic language means The Egyptian.

Iris's father, Habib Elmasry was a successful lawyer and involved in public service. He served on the committee which authored Egypt's first constitution in 1923, served as secretary of Egypt's first Senate in 1923, and drafted Egypt's first modern tax code in the 1930s. He was awarded the title of Pasha in recognition of his services to the State. He was also a devout member of the Coptic Orthodox Church which he faithfully served in many capacities, including forming the Church's first Lay Governing Council which helped to steer the Church and secure its rights in its relations with the Egyptian Government. Habib Elmasry was the secretary of the General Congregation Council for three terms and was known for his strong support of the ordination of a monk to be the Coptic pope and not a metropolitan or a bishop. This issue caused an ongoing dispute in the Coptic Orthodox Church and although The Holy Synod of the Coptic Orthodox Church had considered in the 1960s the general bishops to be secretaries to the pope in the degree of a bishop, Iris Elmasry in her List of Coptic Orthodox Popes of Alexandria considered Pope Shenouda III (1971–2012), who was a general bishop before, to be the fourth bishop to become a pope after Popes John XIX (1928–1942), Macarius III (1942–1944)and Joseph II (1946–1956).

Elmasry received her Bachelor of Arts degree, majoring in education from Maria Grey College, University of London in 1932.

Between 1952 and 1954, she pursued her research at Dropsie College, Philadelphia, and in 1955, she went to the National Gallery, London, to obtain further materials and documents.

In 1954, Pope Joseph II appointed Elmasry as the female delegate of the Coptic Church to the Second Assembly of the World Council of Churches in Evanston, Illinois, USA.

From 1955 to 1985 Elmasry continued to lecture in Coptic History at both the Seminary in Cairo and Alexandria and the Institute of Coptic Studies.

In recognition of her standing amongst Egypt's Coptic community, she was appointed by President Anwar Sadat to Egypt's Senate in the 1970s as one representative of the Coptic minority.

She died on July 2, 1994.

== Work ==
Elmasry took an interest in the history of the Coptic Orthodox Church and in 1948 published the first volume of her nine-volumes book Story of the Coptic church. The seventh volume of this history is about the era of Pope Cyril VI (1959–1971): the book shows how highly appreciative she was of His Holiness's work.

She considered Abouna Matta El Meskeen the Spiritual Father of the Monks in St. Macarius' Monastery in Scetis (Egypt) as her mentor and always expressed gratitude to him in the introductions to her books and also to Father Bishoy Kamel of Alexandria.

Pope Youssab II, the 115th Pope (1946–1956), appointed Elmasry in 1954 as his secretary for correspondence with the World Council of Churches. His successor Pope Kyrillos VI, the 116th Pope (1959–1971), appointed her in 1966 as Counselor to young Coptic women.

While Elmasry's Arabic language publications are among the most widely quoted in the historical literature of the Coptic Church, her impressive work as a theologian, politician, psychologist, educator, and philanthropist is not as widely known. An article by Saad (2009) presents an introduction to her contributions to certain areas of politics and theology, while exploring in more detail unique features of her writing that may offer a framework for Coptic feminine theology.

Elmasry's work was very thorough: she made every effort not to omit details that she considered important. As a result, her work is more detailed, and of greater use to both academic and non-academic readers; is valuable for any researcher in Coptic history and provides a comprehensive approach to the history of Christianity in Egypt and point of view of the Coptic Church regarding many debatable issues like Council of Chalcedon.

In the introduction to the first volume of her nine volumes book on the history of the Coptic Church, she mentions a conversation she had with a non-Egyptian about the Council of Chalcedon, during which she explained the Coptic view regarding the council.

She used a lot of sources in her work and mentioned many known scripts in different languages. Her work shows clear affection towards her church, and high esteem for certain people in the church's history. This may be the reason behind the way she presented the history of Pope Cyril III in comparison to the way it was presented in Abouna Menassa Youhanna's book History of the Coptic Church.

== Books ==
- The Blessed Virgin (1970)
- Habib Pascha El Masry (1971)
- The Story of the Copts, first published in 1975 by the Middle East Council of Churches,
- Introduction to the Coptic Church, published in English in 1977
- Women in the Church (1979)
- The Pharaonic Influence on Modern Coptic Life (1980)
- Bishop Samuel (1983)
- Father Bishoy Kamel (1980)

== See also ==
- Copts
- List of prominent Copts
- Coptic Orthodox Church of Alexandria
- Habib Girgis
- Menassa Youhanna
- Egypt
- Coptic history
