= Metropolitan Pachomius of Beheira =

Egyptian Coptic Orthodox bishop (1935–2025)

His Eminence Pachomius
- Metropolitan of Beheira and Matrouh, Titular Archbishop of Pentapolis and the Five Western Cities, and Abbot of the Monastery of Saint Macarius of Alexandria.
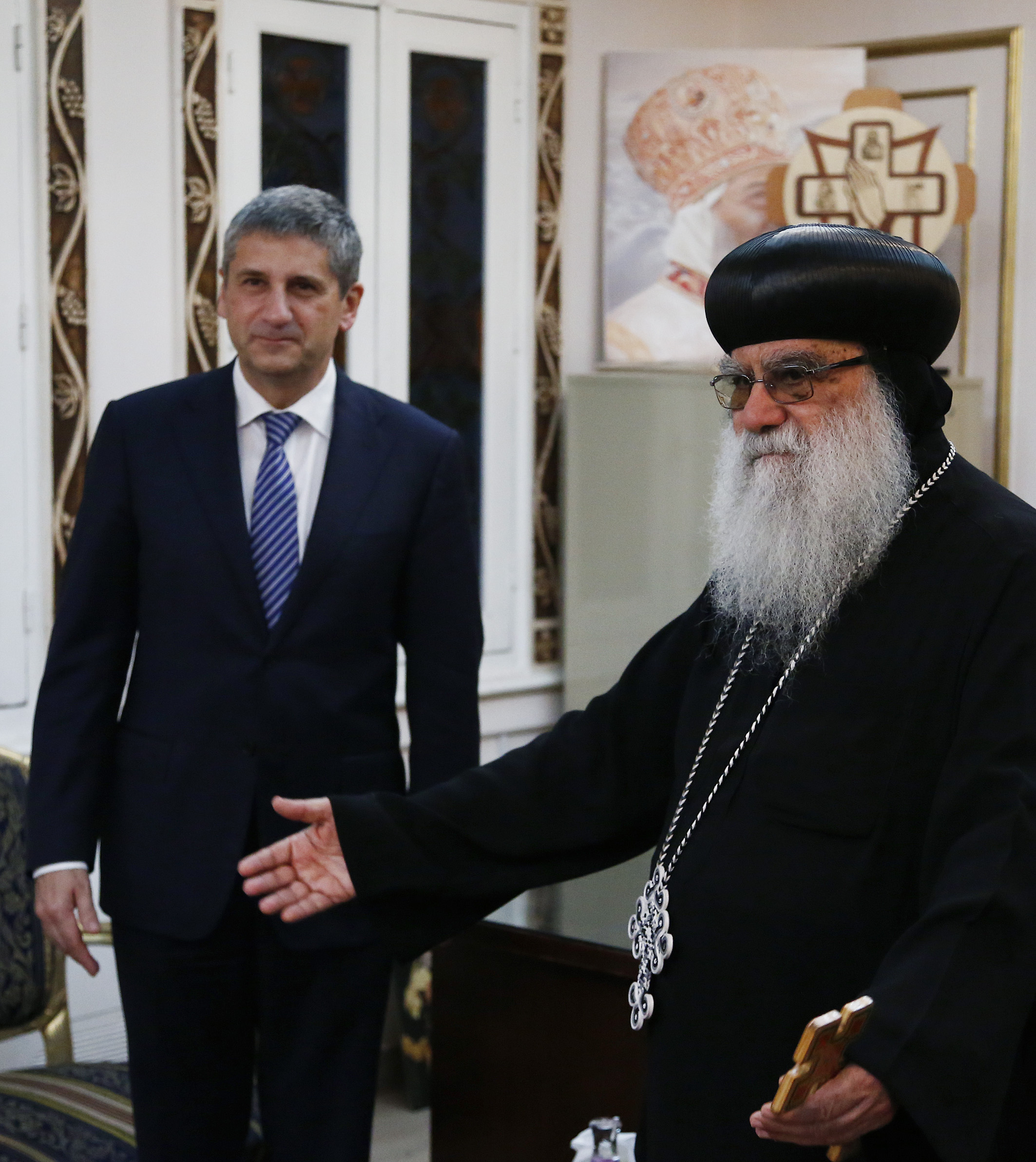
- Pachomius (right) in 2012
- Native name: الأنبا باخوميوس
- Church: Coptic Orthodox Church
- Metropolis: Damanhur
- Diocese: Beheira and Matrouh
- Predecessor: Andraous

Orders
- Ordination: 2 January 1966
- Consecration: 12 December 1971 by Pope Shenouda III
- Rank: Metropolitan Bishop, Titular Archbishop

Personal details
- Born: Samir Khair Sokkar; 17 December 1935 Shibin El Kom, Monufia, Egypt
- Died: 30 March 2025 (aged 89)
- Education: Bachelor of Commerce
- Alma mater: Ain Shams University, Coptic Theological and Clerical College, Higher Institute of Coptic Studies

Metropolitan Pachomius or Pakhomious (Arabic: الأنبا باخوميوس, Coptic: Ⲁⲃⲃⲁ Ⲡⲁϧⲱⲙⲓⲟⲥ; 17 December 1935 – 30 March 2025) was the serving Metropolitan bishop of the Coptic Orthodox Diocese of Beheira and Matrouh, Titular Archbishop of Pentapolis and the Five Western Cities, and Abbot of the Monastery of Saint Macarius of Alexandria, located in Beheira. He was also a member of the standing committee of the Holy Synod of the Coptic Orthodox Church.

== Early life ==
He was born as Samir Khair Sokkar (Arabic: سمير خير سكر), on 17 December 1935 in Shebein el-Kom, Menoufia, Kingdom of Egypt. His family relocated to Tanta around 1945 then to Zaqaziq in 1949. In 1949, at the age of thirteen, he began to serve in Sunday School, at the behest of Walim Shenouda, one of the early deputy servants of the movement. He served in various cities and villages establishing classes and youth meetings. During this time, he met with Nazir Gayed (Pope Shenouda III) and learned from him the essentials of service. In 1952, he moved to Greater Cairo to attend Ain Shams University; during this time, he was one of the founding members of a college meeting and served in the villages of Giza.

After receiving his Bachelor of Commerce, in 1956, he moved to Damietta where he found employment first in the Ministry of Finance, and later as an accounting manager in the Ministry of Health. He also became the general secretary of Sunday school at this time. In 1959, he returned to Greater Cairo to live as a consecrated servant. He managed a house for deacons in Giza, and began attending the Coptic Theological and Clerical College, and then the Higher Institute of Coptic Studies. In 1961, he was sent on a pastoral mission to serve as a Deacon in Kuwait.

== Monastic life ==
In 1962, he returned to Egypt and joined the Syrian Monastery, being tonsured a monk under the name Antonius the Syriac (Arabic: أنطونيوس السرياني). He was ordained as a priest on 2 January 1966, and entrusted with preparing servants and missionaries for Africa.

In 1967, he was sent to serve in Sudan, and there he preached the Gospel and baptized many of the indigenous people who lived there. On 28 July 1968, he was elevated to the rank of Hegumen by Bishop Daniel of Khartoum. In 1971, he was sent by Pope Cyril VI to Ethiopia, and later to London, where he established the first Coptic Church in the United Kingdom.

During this period he was also chosen to represent the Coptic Church in the World Council of Churches, the Middle East Council of Churches, and the All Africa Conference of Churches.

== Episcopate ==
=== Consecration as Bishop ===
On 12 December 1971, he was recalled to Egypt and consecrated as Pachomius (named after St. Pachomius), Bishop of Behira and Pentapolis, by Pope Shenouda III. He was the first bishop to be consecrated by the then-newly elected Pope Shenouda III.

He accompanied Pope Shenouda III on many of his pastoral and diplomatic visits, including those to the Vatican City (1973), Ethiopia (1974), the United States (1977), and Sudan (1978).

=== Elevation to Metropolitan ===
On 2 December 1990, he was elevated to the rank of metropolitan by Pope Shenouda III.

=== Locum Tenens of the See of Alexandria ===
Following the death of the Patriarch of Alexandria, the eldest and most senior metropolitan in the Synod of the Church is customarily called to serve as Locum Tenens until the election of a new pope. When Pope Shenouda III died on 17 March 2012, Metropolitan Mikhail of Asyut, who was the most senior metropolitan at the time declined the role citing his poor health. Metropolitan Pachomius, being second in seniority, was then chosen to fill the position. He served as acting Patriarch until the enthronement of Pope Tawadros II, (formerly General Bishop Tawadros of Behira, who served alongside Metropolitan Pachomius) on 18 November 2012.

== Death ==
Pachomius died on 30 March 2025, at the age of 89. His body rests in the Monastery of St. Macarius of Alexandria in Mount Al-Qalali.
