= Paoni =

- Native name: Coptic: Ⲡⲁⲱⲛⲓ
- Calendar: Coptic calendar
- Month number: 10
- Number of days: 30
- Gregorian equivalent: June–July

Paoni (Coptic: Ⲡⲁⲱⲛⲓ, Paōni), also known as Payni (Ancient Greek: Παϋνί, Paüní) and Ba'unah (Arabic: بأونه, Ba'una), is the tenth month of the ancient Egyptian and Coptic calendars. It lasts between June 8 and July 7 of the Gregorian calendar.

Paoni is also the second month of the Season of Shemu (Harvest) in Ancient Egypt, where the Egyptians harvest their crops throughout the land.

== Name ==
The name "Paoni" derives from its original Egyptian name "Month of the Valley Festival" (Ancient Egyptian: pꜣ n in.t) in reference to an annual celebration of Thebes.

== Coptic Synaxarium of the month of Paoni ==
| Coptic | Julian | Gregorian | Commemorations |
|---|---|---|---|
| Paoni 1 | May 26 | June 8 | Martyrdom of St. Cosmas of Taha and his companions; Martyrdom of St. Zikam; Consecration of the church of St. Leontius the Syrian.; Consecration of the church of St. Phoebammon (Abu-Fam) the soldier; Departure of Fr. Matta El Meskeen. |
| Paoni 2 | May 27 | June 9 | Appearance of the bodies of St. John the Baptist and Elisha, the Prophet.; Departure of St. John XVIII, the 107th Pope of Alexandria. |
| Paoni 3 | May 28 | June 10 | Consecration of the first church of St. George in the cities of Birma, Egypt and Beer Maa, Egypt; Martyrdom of St. Alladius the Bishop; Departure of St. Martha of Egypt; Departure of St. Cosmas I, the 44th Pope of Alexandria.; Departure of St. Abraam, Bishop of Fayoum. |
| Paoni 4 | May 29 | June 11 | Martyrdom of St. Synesius (Sanusi) of Balqim; Martyrdom of St. Amoun & St. Sophia the Righteous; Martyrdom of St. John of Heraclea; Departure of St. Hor; Departure of St. John VIII, the 80th Pope of Alexandria |
| Paoni 5 | May 30 | June 12 | Departure of St. James the Oriental; Martyrdom of St. Pshay & St. Peter; Consecration of the Church of St. Victor in Shu |
| Paoni 6 | May 31 | June 13 | Martyrdom of St. Theodore the Monk of Alexandria |
| Paoni 7 | June 1 | June 14 | Martyrdom of St. Abaskhiron the Soldier |
| Paoni 8 | June 2 | June 15 | Commemoration of the consecration of the Church of the Holy Virgin Mary in Musturud; Martyrdom of St. Amadah and her sons, and St. Armanius and his mother St. Amah; Martyrdom of St. George the New Martyr |
| Paoni 9 | June 3 | June 16 | Departure of Samuel, the Prophet.; Martyrdom of St. Lucilianus, and four others with him; Relocation of the relics of St. Mercurius to Cairo, Egypt. |
| Paoni 10 | June 4 | June 17 | Martyrdom of St. Eudaemon, St. Epistemon, & St. Sophia; Commemoration of the closing of the pagan temples and the opening of the Christian Churches by St. Constantine the Great.; Departure of St. John XVI, the 103rd Pope of Alexandria.; Enthronement of St. Demetrius II, the 111th Pope of Alexandria. |
| Paoni 11 | June 5 | June 18 | Martyrdom of St. Claudius, son of Ptolemy and nephew of Numerian the Emperor; Consecration of the altar of the Forty Martyrs of Sebaste at the Savior's Church in Alexandria. |
| Paoni 12 | June 6 | June 19 | Commemoration of Michael, the Archangel.; Departure of St. Justus, the 6th Pope of Alexandria.; Departure of St. Cyril II, the 67th Pope of Alexandria.; Departure of St. Euphemia the Widow |
| Paoni 13 | June 7 | June 20 | Commemoration of Gabriel the Archangel, the Announcer of Daniel the Prophet.; Departure of St. John II, Bishop of Jerusalem |
| Paoni 14 | June 8 | June 21 | Martyrdom of Sts. Cyrus, John, Ptolemaeus and Philip; Departure of St. John XIX, the 113th Pope of Alexandria. |
| Paoni 15 | June 9 | June 22 | The turning over of the relics of St. Mark the Apostle by the hand of Pope Paul VI, Pope of Rome.; Consecration of the Church of St. Menas at Maryut |
| Paoni 16 | June 10 | June 23 | Departure of St. Onuphrius the Anchorite; Commemoration of St. Latson the Anchorite |
| Paoni 17 | June 11 | June 24 | Departure of St. Latsoun El-Bahnasa; Return of the relics of St. Mark to St. Mark Cathedral |
| Paoni 18 | June 12 | June 25 | Departure of St. Damian, the 35th Pope of Alexandria.; Inauguration of St. Mark Cathedral in the Monastery of Anba Rowais. |
| Paoni 19 | June 13 | June 26 | Departure of St. Archillas, the 18th Pope of Alexandria; Martyrdom of St. George el-Mozahem.; Martyrdom of St. Bishai and St. Anoub; First Pontifical Liturgy in St. Mark Cathedral in the Monastery of Anba Rowais. |
| Paoni 20 | June 14 | June 27 | Departure of Elisha, the Prophet. |
| Paoni 21 | June 15 | June 28 | Commemoration of the first church for the Virgin Mary in the city of Caesarea Philippi; Martyrdom of St. Timothy the Egyptian of Memphis; Departure of St. Kadronos, 4th Pope of Alexandria |
| Paoni 22 | June 16 | June 29 | Consecration of the Church of Sts. Cosmas, Damian, their mother, and brothers |
| Paoni 23 | June 17 | June 30 | Departure of St. Abba Noub, the Confessor |
| Paoni 24 | June 18 | July 1 | Martyrdom of St. Moses the Black |
| Paoni 25 | June 19 | July 2 | Martyrdom of St. Jude, one of the Seventy Disciples; Departure of St. Peter IV, the 34th Pope of Alexandria |
| Paoni 26 | June 20 | July 3 | Departure of Joshua the Prophet, son of Nun; Consecration of the Church of Gabriel, the Archangel |
| Paoni 27 | June 21 | July 4 | Martyrdom of St. Ananias, the Apostle.; Martyrdom of St. Thomas of Shentalet |
| Paoni 28 | June 22 | July 5 | Departure of St. Theodosius, the 33rd Pope of Alexandria; Commemoration of the consecration of the Church of St. Sarabamoun, Bishop of Nikiu |
| Paoni 29 | June 23 | July 6 | Martyrdom of the Seven Ascetic Saints in Tounar Mount; Martyrdom of Sts. Abba Hour and his mother Theodora; Consecration of the Church of Suriel, the Archangel |
| Paoni 30 | June 24 | July 7 | Nativity of St. John the Baptist |
