= General Congregation Council =

Laity of the Coptic Orthodox Church of Alexandria

General Congregation Council (Arabic: المجلس الملي العام للأقباط الأرثوذكس) is part of the Coptic Orthodox Church of Alexandria and represents the laity of the Church, it is also known as the Coptic Orthodox Lay Council

Established in February 1874 during the vacancy time of the Patriarchal Throne before the election of Pope Cyril V of Alexandria. The order for its establishment was issued by Isma'il Pasha who was, then, the Khedive of Egypt. The first rules of the Council were issued in January 1874 by Khedive Tewfik Pasha who ruled Egypt after his father Isma'il Pasha. By 1883, the Council was fully established and in charge of managing non ecclesiastical matters of the church.

The Chairman of the council is the Pope of the Coptic Orthodox Church of Alexandria.

== General Secretary ==
Currently the General Secretary for the Council is Dr. Tharwat Bassily. Previously this post has seen many prominent Copts like Boutros Ghali the grandfather of Boutros Boutros Ghali and Habib Elmasry the father of Iris Habib Elmasry.

== Members ==
Currently the Council is formed of twenty four members (males and females) elected by the Copts in Egypt and is chaired by the Pope.

== Relations with the Popes ==
The Council had a disagreement with Pope Cyril V of Alexandria at the start of his pontificate, which was resolved in the Pontiff's favour. This was followed by several confrontations between the two parties, primarily because of the Pope's objection about the interference of the Council in the church's matters.

There were at many times tension between the Council and the Pope, especially during the Pontificate of Pope Macarius III (1942–1944), the council agreed with The Holy Synod of the Coptic Orthodox Church in the decision to remove Pope Joseph II (1946–1956) from office in 1954.

During the Pontificate of Pope Cyril VI (1959–1971) there was no major disagreements and Pope Shenouda III (1971–2012) maintained a good relationship with the Council, since he was the Chairman of the Council.

== See also ==
- Coptic Orthodox Church
- The Holy Synod of the Coptic Orthodox Church
