= Coptic Orthodox Diocese of Beheira =

Coptic Church diocese in northwest Egypt

Oriental Orthodox

Location
- Country: Egypt
- Territory: Beheira and Matrouh
- Metropolitan: Damanhur

Information
- Denomination: Coptic Orthodox
- Rite: Alexandrian

Current leadership
- Pope: Tawadros II
- Diocesan Bishop: Elarion

The Coptic Orthodox Diocese of Beheira is a diocese of the Coptic Church in the northwest of Egypt. It is headquartered in the metropolis of Damanhur, and was headed by Metropolitan Pachomius before his death in 2025.

== Jurisdiction ==
The modern diocese comprises the governorates of Beheira, and Matrouh. These governorates encompass the ancient suffragan dioceses of: Buto, Naucratis, Mareotis, Paraetonium, and Apis.

== History ==
The history of the diocese is obscure before the 20th century, however, it is clear that during the medieval period the numerous episcopal sees that populated the North Coast of Egypt were consolidated into this single diocese, due to rampant depopulation and conversion. The first recorded mention of the Diocese of Beheira is a reference to its bishop Marcos I, who consecrated the Myron with Pope Benjamin II.

During the early 20th century, the diocese underwent two mergers with neighboring dioceses.

=== Merger with the Diocese of Monufia ===
Following the death of Bishop Ioannes I of Monufia in 1894, the people of the diocese declined to have a new bishop consecrated for them; rather, they chose to have Metropolitan Ioannes I of Beheira (later elected Pope John XIX), to be enthroned over their diocese. Thus, Ioannes I of Beheira also served as Ioannes II of Monufia, until his resignation from both dioceses in 1928 due to his election to the Patriarchate. This merger lasted from 1894 to 1928.

=== Merger with the Diocese of Gharbia ===
Following the election of Pope John XIX, the see of Beheira remained vacant for two years. In 1930, following the death of Bishop Peter II of Gharbia, Pope John XIX decided to ordain new bishops to fill the three newly vacant sees. He chose to separate the diocese Monufia from the diocese Beheira, consecration for it a bishop by the name of Demetirus. He also decided to merge the Diocese of Gharbia with Beheira consecrating for them Bishop Tomas of Beheira and Gharbia. This merger lasted from 1930 to 1968.

=== Return to independence ===
Following the death of Metropolitan Isaak in 1968, Pope Cyril VI consecrated Bishop Andraous for Gharbia in 1969. The see of Beheira remained vacant until Pope Shenouda III consecrated Bishop Pachomius (later elevated to the rank of Metropolitan) in late 1971.

== List of bishops ==
- Marcos I (~14th c)
- Marcos II (?–1887)
- Ioannes I (1887–1928, elected Patriarch)
- Tomas (1930–1956)
- Isaak (1959–1968)
- Pachomius (1971–2025)

Elarion (2025- ) https://st-takla.org/Saints/bishops/alif/elarion-hagana-almaza.html
