= Matta El Meskeen =

Egyptian Coptic Orthodox monk

Matta El Meskeen (English: Matthew the Poor; 20 September 1919 – 8 June 2006), born Youssef Iskandar, was a Coptic Orthodox monk. He was the key figure in the revival of Coptic monasticism, a movement which began in 1969 when he was appointed to the Monastery of St Macarius in the Wadi El Natrun in Egypt. By the time of his death the community had grown from 6 aged monks to 130 monks, and as many other monasteries were revived, new ones also began to open. He was twice nominated to become Coptic Pope, but was not chosen in either case.

Matta was also a theologian, and author of 181 books and hundreds of journal articles on Biblical exegesis, Ecclesiastical rites, spiritual and theological matters, and much more. Some of these writings were controversial.

== Early life ==
Father Matta El Meskeen was born Youssef Iskander in Banha, Qalyubia Governorate, Egypt, in 1919, although the website for the St. Macarius monastery says that he was born in Damanhur, Egypt. In 1944, he graduated in Pharmacy from the University of Cairo. After leading a successful life and establishing a wealthy lifestyle for himself—Iskander at the time was the owner of two pharmacies, two villas, and two cars—he renounced his material possessions in 1948, and entered the monastery of Saint Samuel the Confessor in Mount Qalamoun (roughly near Maghagha, Upper Egypt). In 1951, he was ordained as a priest against his will.

== Monastic life ==
After living for a few years in the monastery of St. Samuel the Confessor in Mount Qalamoun, Father Matta decided to move out into Wadi El Rayan in the late 1950s. There, he lived as a recluse in the spirit of the ancient Desert Fathers for twelve years. By 1960, seven other monks had joined him. The community expanded to twelve by 1964. These twelve monks were sent by Pope Kyrillos VI to Wadi El Natrun in 1969 to develop the monastery of St. Macarius the Great.

At that time only six elderly, frail fathers lived near the road between Cairo and Alexandria. Matta and his twelve companions cared for them while reconstructing the monastery. The administrative, agricultural, institutional, and printing/publishing developments at the renewed Monastery of St. Macarius the Great were staggering. President Sadat donated land to the monastery to be brought into cultivation. But the spiritual revolution was much greater. By 1981 Matta had over eighty monks in the monastery. The monastery also finances services and projects for the poor, both Muslims and Christians.

== Spiritual guide ==
Father Matta was once the Father in Confession and spiritual guide of Pope Shenouda III (during the 1950s). Father Matta was also the spiritual guide of the late Alexandrian priest Father Bishoy Kamel a contemporary Coptic Orthodox saint, and the Coptic historian Iris Habib Elmasry.

Alongside two others (Bishop Samuel and Bishop (and later Pope) Shenouda, Father Matta was a candidate for the Patriarchal throne in 1971, following the death of Pope Cyril VI of Alexandria (Kyrillos VI) but he did not reach the final stage of three candidates.

== Controversy ==
Father Matta El Meskeen is considered by many as a prominent Copt. But he was allegedly suspended from position in the Coptic Church twice, first by Pope Yusab II in 1955, and then again by Pope Kyrillos VI for nine years from 1960 to 1969. This seems to have been for administrative or political reasons. For instance, his book about 'the Church and the State', in which he called for total separation of the two as well as certain theological issues.

For many years before Father Matta's departure there were many reports about disagreements between him and Pope Shenouda III.

However, he maintained the respect and admiration of many within and without the Coptic Church as both a theologian and an ascetic. At his death, Metropolitan Mikhail of Asyut (the abbot responsible for the monastery) wrote: "for truth and history’s sake I say that Father Matta Al-Miskin was a brilliant scholar, a turning point, a new level of writing and literary activity through the long period of his monastic life."

== Relationship with Pope Shenouda III ==
During the 1950s, Father Matta was at one time spiritual father and confessor of the man who became Pope Shenouda III. Pope Shenouda acknowledged Father Matta El-Meskeen, whom he calls "my father monk" in the introduction to his book Intelaq Al-Rouh (The Release of the Spirit).

But there seems to have been some major disagreements between both leaders and their followers, e.g., in relation to the concept of theosis and also regarding Father Matta's position on Mark 16.

Pope Shenouda visited St Macarius monastery in November 1996, a date which coincided with the silver jubilee of his consecration as pope, and was warmly welcomed by Father Matta who described the visit as a "special blessing".

== Quotations ==
"Whenever physical hunger turned cruel against me, I found my gratification in prayer. Whenever the biting cold of winter was unkind to me, I found my warmth in prayer. Whenever people were harsh to me (and their harshness was severe indeed) I found my comfort in prayer. In short, prayer became my food and my drink, my outfit and my armor, whether by night or by day."

"It is no joy for the church to have many active members of varied services who lack the spiritual proficiency for renewing souls and regenerating them in a genuine spiritual rebirth to win them for the Kingdom of Heaven. The true joy of the Church lies in leaders who possess spiritual insight, who walk ahead of their flocks so that the flocks can follow a sure path. It is not possible to obtain spiritual insight by action or study, spiritual insight is attained by silence, retreat and long prayers in their various stages."

"I felt I was late to come to the knowledge of Christ; studying the Bible appeared such a daunting task. In desperation, I asked the Lord to give me either a long life to have enough time to study the Bible well, or enough wisdom to grasp its hidden meanings. In His everlasting generosity, God gave me both."

When asked why he never defended himself against the many accusations regarding some of his writings, Father Matta El-Meskeen replied,

"Did you read the Exposition of the Gospel of John and benefit from it? ... My son I won't spend my time replying to anyone, but, my son, I will die and they will die and the Church will remain, as well as what we offered to her, and the next generations will judge us."

The Gospel of the day of his departure (June 8, 2006) according to the Coptic Lectionary was John 15:17-25.

=== Disputable quotations ===
In a rare interview with Time magazine, after Sadat had exiled Pope Shenouda, Matta El Meskeen was quoted as saying the following:

I can't say I'm happy, but I am at peace now. Every morning I was expecting news of more bloody collisions. Sadat's actions protect the church and the Copts. They are from God.

The interview happened just days before terrorists assassinated Sadat during a military parade on 6 October 1981.

== See also ==
- Coptic Orthodox Church of Alexandria
- List of prominent Copts
