= Saint Mark's Coptic Orthodox Cathedral =

Coordinates: 30°04′20″N 31°16′32″E

Saint Mark Coptic Orthodox Cathedral
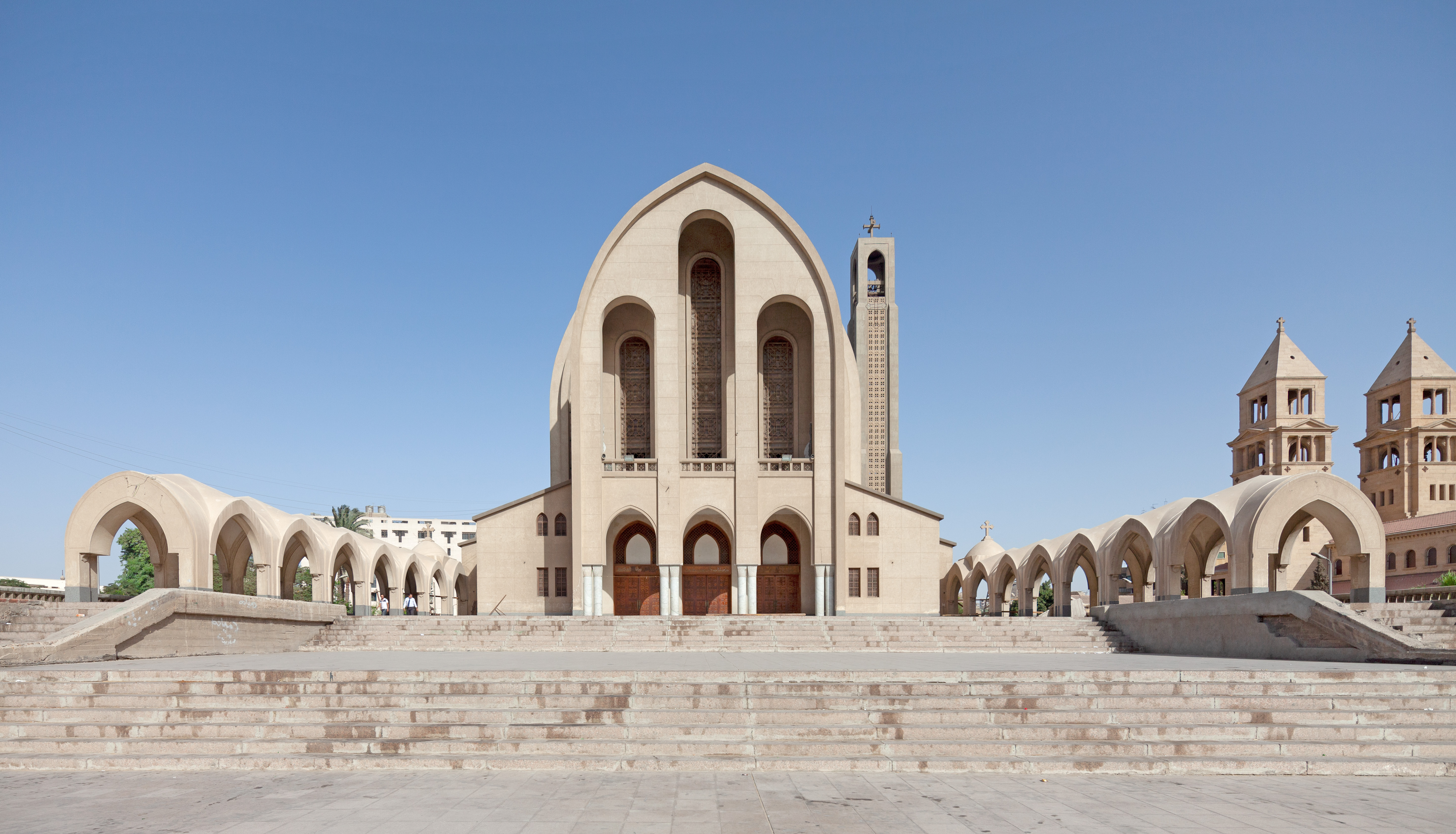
- St. Mark's Cathedral in 2010
- Saint Mark Coptic Orthodox Cathedral
- Location: Abbassia, Cairo
- Country: Egypt
- Denomination: Coptic Orthodox Church

History
- Status: Cathedral
- Founder: Pope Cyril VI of Alexandria
- Dedication: Saint Mark
- Consecrated: 25 June 1968

Architecture
- Architect(s): Awad Kamel; Michel Bakhoum (structural consultant)
- Architectural type: Church
- Style: Coptic

Administration
- Division: Coptic Orthodox Patriarchate

Clergy
- Bishop: Pope Tawadros II

Saint Mark's Coptic Orthodox Cathedral (Arabic: كاتدرائية القديس مرقس القبطية الأرثوذكسية, romanized: Kātidrāʼīyat al-Qiddīs Murqus al-Qibṭīyah al-Urthūdhuksīyah) is a Coptic church located in the Abbassia District in Cairo, Egypt. The cathedral is the seat of the Coptic Orthodox Pope. It was built during the time when Pope Cyril VI of Alexandria was Pope, and was consecrated on 25 June 1968.

The church is dedicated to St. Mark the Evangelist, an apostle of Jesus and founder of the Coptic Orthodox Church. Relics of his life are kept inside. It was, until 2019, (after the inauguration of the new Nativity Cathedral) the largest cathedral in Africa and the Middle East. (Note: This claim can still be valid as contrary to popular belief of the largest "cathedral" being the Basilica of Our Lady of Peace of Yamoussoukro in Yamoussoukro, the administrative capital of Côte d'Ivoire (Ivory Coast), which is considered the largest church in the world but not a cathedral. The nearby Cathedral of Saint Augustine is the principal place of worship and seat of the bishop of the Diocese of Yamoussoukro.)

== History of the land ==
The cathedral is located in the place of a village called p-Sovt em-p-Hoi (Coptic: ⲡⲥⲟⲃⲧ ⲙ̀ⲡϩⲟⲓ "the wall of the moat") which had been given to the Coptic Church in 969 by Jawhar. This land was a replacement for the land that was taken from the church to be included in building the Palace of Al-Mu'izz li-Din Allah as part of the planning of the new capital of Egypt, Cairo.

During the twelfth century the area contained ten Coptic churches, but during the rule of Qalawun on 18 February 1280, the churches were destroyed by Muslims who persecuted the Copts. Two churches were subsequently built in the area under the rule of his son.

In 1943, the governorate of Cairo attempted to expropriate the area for public use. This was opposed by the General Congregation Council led by its secretary at the time, Habib Elmasry. The campaign proved successful as the Coptic Church maintained control of the land under the condition that a non-profit building be built on it in the following fifteen years. This condition spurred the building of the cathedral.

== Papal Residence ==
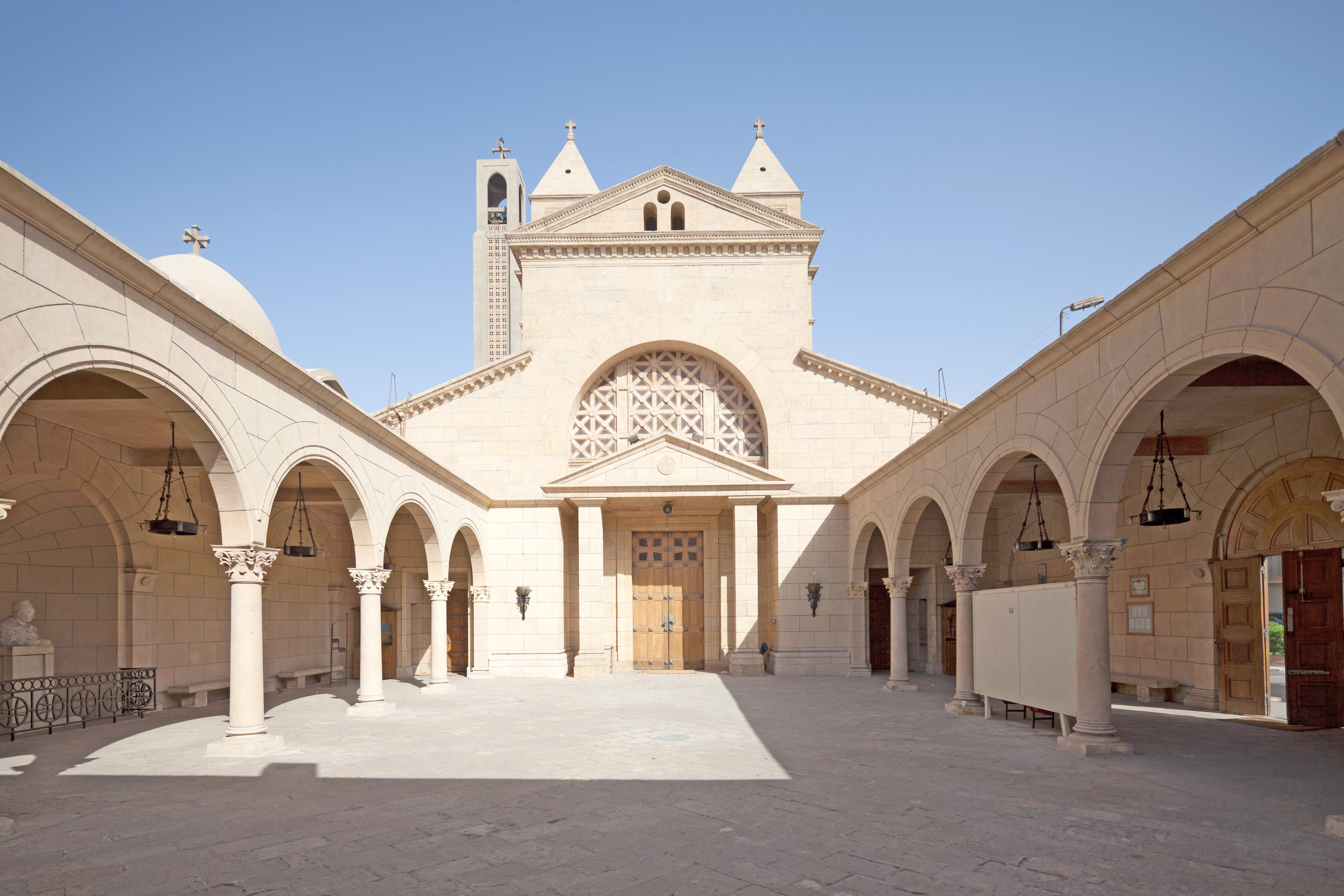
The entrance of the St. Peter & St. Paul's Chapel inside the Cathedral

The cathedral is where Pope Tawadros II of Alexandria has his office; thus, security is normally high here. However, on 11 December 2016, during the Muslim festival of Mawlid, the chapel near the cathedral was the venue of an Islamic terrorist attack that killed at least 25 people, most of them women and children. This attack is a copycat of various other earlier attacks against Coptic churches in Egypt.

== Architecture ==
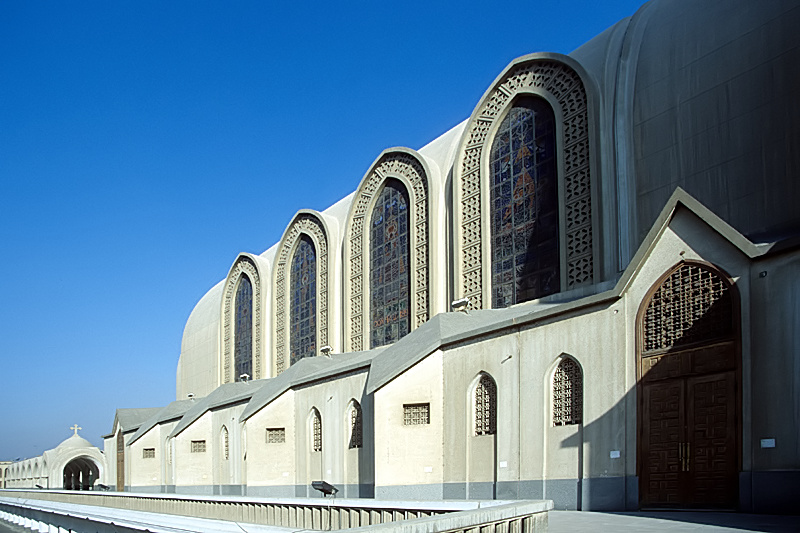
View of the cathedral

The cathedral is considered a unique example of architectural evolution which includes seven churches of which some have a great historic value such as the Church of St. Rewiss. The Cathedral represents the rapid development of Coptic architecture, as the famous Coptic civil engineer Michel Bakhoum contributed in its structural design. It has a capacity for 5,000 worshipers.

== Relics of Saint Mark ==
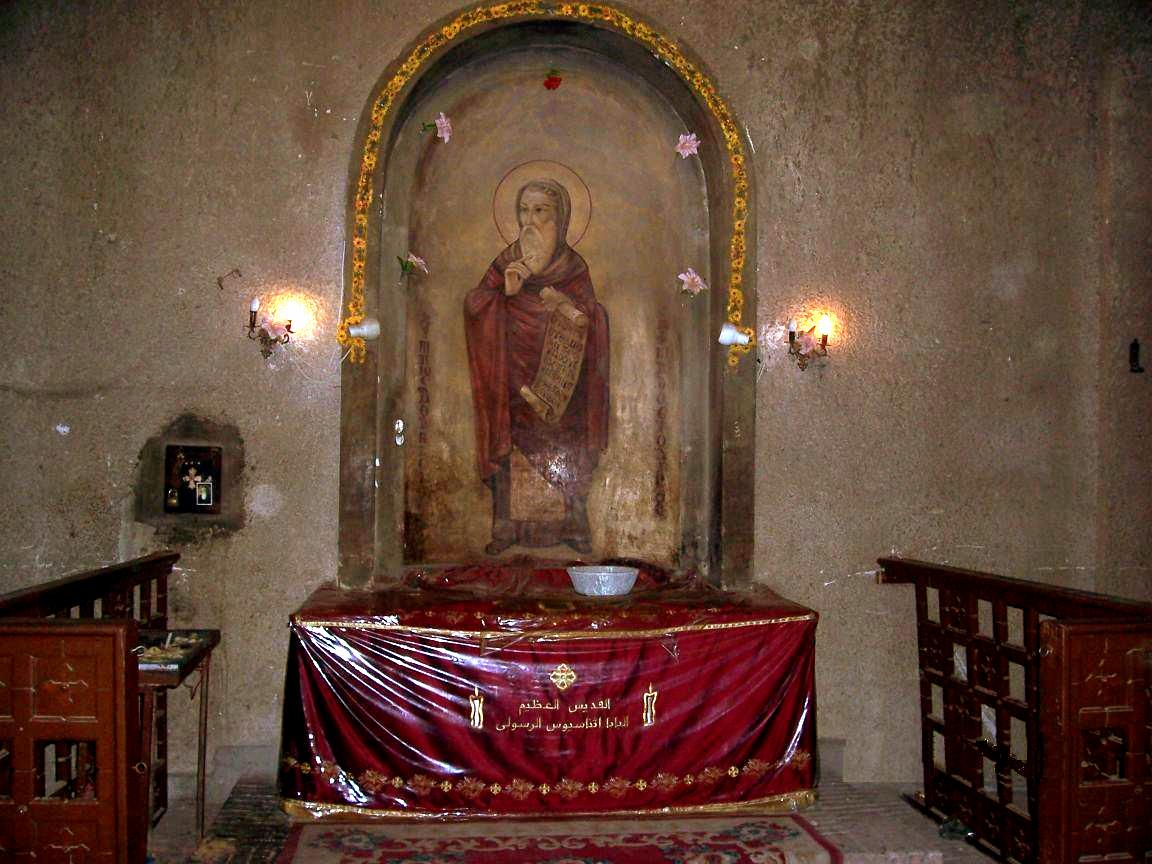
Saint Athanasius shrine

Before the completion of the cathedral, the Roman Catholic pontiff of the time, Pope Paul VI, returned part of St. Mark's relics, which were stolen from Alexandria, Egypt in the year 828 to Venice, Italy, although the head itself remained in Alexandria. These relics were taken to the newly constructed Cathedral, where they were placed in a specially-built shrine brightly decorated with Coptic icons, where they have remained until the present time.

== Inauguration ceremony ==
The inauguration of the new Saint Mark's Coptic Orthodox Cathedral took place on 25 June 1968 in a ceremony hosted by Pope Cyril VI and attended by Egyptian President Gamal Abdel Nasser and Ethiopian Emperor Haile Selassie, among other foreign clergy members from other churches.

== Design ==
Engineers Dr. Awad Kamel and Salim Kamel Fahmy won the competition for drawing and designing the cathedral. The structural design was prepared by Dr. Michel Bakhoum, Egyptian structural engineer.The Nile General Company for Reinforced Concrete (SEPCO) implemented the cathedral’s giant building. The cathedral was designed in the shape of a cross.

== Burials ==
- Athanasius of Alexandria
- St Reweis (Teji)
- Abouna Mikhail Ibrahim
- Athanasius Yeshue Samuel

== See also ==
- Botroseya Church bombing
- 2017 Palm Sunday church bombings
- List of large Orthodox cathedrals
