= Macarius III =

Macarius III may refer to:

- Macarius III Zaim (died 1672)
- Pope Macarius III of Alexandria (1872–1945)

== See also ==
- Makarios III (1913–1977)
