= Christian Egypt =

Christian Egypt may refer to:

- Christianity in Egypt, an overview of the Christian religion in contemporary Egypt
- Christian-majority Egypt from the 3rd to 7th centuries (see Roman Egypt § Christianity)

== See also ==
- Coptic history
- Diocese of Egypt
