= Menassa Youhanna =

Egyptian priest, theologian and historian

Father (Fr.) Menassa Youhanna
- Born: August 1899; Mallawi, Upper Egypt
- Died: 16 May 1930 (aged 30)
- Education: Coptic Theological Seminary, Cairo (entered 1915)
- Occupations: Coptic Orthodox priest; theologian; historian; spiritual writer
- Known for: Comprehensive History of the Coptic Orthodox Church; theological and spiritual writings
- Notable work: History of the Coptic Orthodox Church; The Crucified Jesus; The Way to Heaven; The Sun of Righteousness; A Guide to the Bible; Saint John Chrysostom; History of the Spread of Christianity; The Life of Adam; The Vial of Precious Perfume; The Complete Evidence for the True Faith by Saint Athanasius; The Influence of Christianity
- Style: Elegant, accessible prose blending theological nuance with historical narrative

Father Menassa Youhanna (1899–1930) was a Coptic priest, historian and theologian, most noted for his work on the history of the Coptic Orthodox Church of Alexandria.

== Biography ==
He was born in August, 1899 in Mallawi in Upper Egypt and died on Friday May 16, 1930, at the age of 30. Born in a Coptic Orthodox family, his father was also a priest.

Abouna is his informative title meaning our father in Egyptian Arabic which is used among Copts to call any Priest in the Coptic Orthodox Church, and until the nineteenth and early twentieth centuries it could be used to call a Metropolitan, a Bishop or even the Pope by the word Abouna meaning my father. This has been replaced now by the word sayedna meaning our master for The Pope and any other Bishop.

At the unusually young age of 16, he joined the newly opened Coptic Theological Seminary in Cairo. After completing his studies there, he returned to Mallawi to serve as a preacher. He was ordained to the priesthood on January 25, 1925.

== Books ==
His book about the History of the Coptic Orthodox Church is very comprehensive; in about five hundred and thirty pages he managed to give a summary of the Church's history over nineteen centuries without omitting important details.

He depended on both Coptic and non Coptic sources for his work and in his account of the history of the Coptic Church he tried to be non-biased although his compassion towards his church is very noticeable.

He had other books about the church and theological topics.

1. The Way to Heaven.
2. The Crucified Jesus.
3. The Sun of Righteousness.
4. A Guide to the Bible.
5. Saint John Chrysostom.
6. History of the Spread of Christianity.
7. The Life of Adam.
8. The Vial of Precious Perfume.
9. The Complete Evidence for the True Faith by Saint Athanasious.
10. The Influence of Christianity.

== Style ==
Putting in mind that he wrote his books to be read mainly by non-academic readers without disregarding academic ones, and that he wrote it in the early 1920s, his style is elegant yet easy to read and his work would be of good use for any person interested in this church's history from the beginnings till early 1920s . He tried to give a history of the Coptic church in a way that is easy to understand and relate. In his attempt to do this he used simple yet correct language, and he tried to put the names in a standardised form; for example, when wrote about the Popes with the Name John he used the name Youhanna and not Youannis so the reader can relate that the name is the same but can be put in different versions

When comparing his work with the History of the Coptic Church by Iris Habib Elmasry, Abouna Menassa's account is more concise and neutral, although leaving out some details included in Miss Elmasry's books, which made her work of use to both academic and non academic readers. Miss Elmasry used his work as one of her sources.

One of the notable differences between the two historians is the way the history of Pope Cyril III is presented in Miss Elmasry's book in comparison to the way it was presented in Abouna Youhanna's book.

Although both of them had notable affection towards the Coptic Church, Abouna Menassa's account was more neutral when approaching the matter of selection of this Pontiff to be the Pope.

== See also ==
- List of prominent Copts
- Habib Girgis
