= Patriarch Macarius III =

Patriarch Macarius III may refer to:

- Macarius III Ibn al-Za'im, Patriarch of Antioch from 1647 to 1672
- Pope Macarius III of Alexandria, Pope of Alexandria & Patriarch of the See of St. Mark in 1944–1945
