= Patrimony =

Patrimony may refer to:

== Law ==
- Patrimony, or property, the total of all personal and real entitlements, including movable and immovable property, belonging to a real person or a juristic person
- Patrimony, or inheritance, a right or estate inherited from one's father, or other ancestor though the male line
- Patrimony of affectation, defined as property, assets, or a legal estate that can be divided for a fiduciary purpose; distinct from a person's general assets
- Family patrimony, a type of civil law patrimony that is created by marriage or civil union

== Arts ==
- Patrimony (novel), a 2007 science fiction novel by Alan Dean Foster
- Patrimony: A True Story, a 1991 non-fiction memoir by American novelist Philip Roth
- Patrimony (film), a 2018 Czech comedy film

== Politics ==
- National patrimony, the store of wealth or accumulated reserves of a national economy
- Patrimonialism, a form of governance in which all power, both public and private, flows directly from the leader
- Neopatrimonialism, a social system in which patrons use state resources to secure the loyalty of clients in the general population
- Patrimonium Sancti Petri (Patrimony of St. Peter), a medieval state in Italy, ruled by the Pope
