= Coptic history =

Aspect of the history of Egypt

Coptic history is the part of the history of Egypt that begins with the introduction of Christianity in Egypt in the 1st century AD during the Roman period, and covers the history of the Copts to the present day. The Coptic Church is one of the oldest Christian churches in the world, being founded by St. Mark the Evangelist around 42 to 44 AD. Coptic history spans apostolic foundation, the Catechetical School of Alexandria, unique craftsmanship, and various edicts and councils that shaped Coptic tradition. It also includes the Arab invasions and conquests that replaced Christianity with Islam as the majority religion of Egypt, making the Coptic community a minority in Egypt to this day. Many of the historic items related to Coptic Christianity are on display in museums around the world. A large number is in the Coptic Museum in Coptic Cairo.

== Apostolic foundation ==
Egypt is identified in the Bible as the place of refuge that the Holy Family sought in its flight from Judea: "When he arose, he took the young Child and His mother by night and departed for Egypt, and was there until the death of Herod the Great, that it might be fulfilled which was spoken by the Lord through the prophet, saying, Out of Egypt I called My Son" (Matthew 2:12-23).

The Egyptian Church, which is now more than nineteen centuries old, regards itself as the subject of many prophecies in the Old Testament. Isaiah the prophet says "In that day there will be an altar to the LORD in the midst of the land of Egypt, and a pillar to the LORD at its border" (Isaiah 19:19).

The first Christians in Egypt were mainly Alexandrian Jews such as Theophilus, whom Luke the Evangelist addresses in the introductory chapter of his gospel. When the Church of Alexandria was founded by Mark the Evangelist during the reign of the Roman emperor Nero, a great multitude of native Egyptians (as opposed to Greeks or Jews) embraced the Christian faith.

Christianity spread throughout Egypt within half a century of Mark's arrival in Alexandria, as is clear from the New Testament writings found in Bahnasa in Middle Egypt, which date around the year 200 AD. A fragment of the Gospel of John, written in Coptic, was also found in Upper Egypt and can be dated to the first half of the 2nd century. In the 2nd century, Christianity began to spread to the rural areas, and scriptures were translated into the local language, namely Coptic.

== Catechetical School ==
The Catechetical School of Alexandria is the oldest catechetical school in the world. Jerome records that the Christian School of Alexandria was founded by Mark himself. Around 190 AD under the leadership of the scholar Pantanaeus, the school of Alexandria became an important institution of religious learning, where students were taught by scholars such as Athenagoras, Clement, Didymus, and the native Egyptian Origen, who was considered the father of theology and who was also active in the field of commentary and comparative Biblical studies. Origen wrote over 6,000 commentaries of the Bible in addition to his famous Hexapla.

Many scholars such as Jerome visited the school of Alexandria to exchange ideas and to communicate directly with its scholars. The scope of this school was not limited to theological subjects; science, mathematics and humanities were also taught there. The question-and-answer method of commentary began there, and 15 centuries before Braille, wood-carving techniques were in use there by blind scholars to read and write.

== Cradle of Monasticism and its missionary work ==
Many Egyptian Christians went to the desert during the 3rd century, and remained there to pray and work and dedicate their lives to seclusion and worship of God. This was the beginning of the monastic movement, which was organized by Anthony the Great, Paul (the world's first anchorite), Macarius the Great and Pachomius the Cenobite in the 4th century.

Christian Monasticism was born in Egypt and was instrumental in the formation of the Coptic Orthodox Church character of submission, simplicity and humility, thanks to the teachings and writings of the Great Fathers of Egypt's Deserts. By the end of the 5th century, there were hundreds of monasteries, and thousands of cells and caves scattered throughout the Egyptian desert. A great number of these monasteries are still flourishing and have new vocations to this day.

All Christian monasticism stems, either directly or indirectly, from the Egyptian example: Basil the Great Archbishop of Caesaria of Cappadocia, founder and organiser of the monastic movement in Asia Minor, visited Egypt around 357 AD and his rule is followed by the Eastern Orthodox Churches; Jerome who translated the Bible into Latin, came to Egypt, while en route to Jerusalem, around 400 AD and left details of his experiences in his letters; Benedict founded the Benedictine Order in the 6th century on the model of Pachomius, but in a stricter form. Countless pilgrims have visited the "Desert Fathers" to emulate their spiritual, disciplined lives.

== Crafts ==
Coptic history also includes the presence of crafts and artwork. An embroidered fragment of tapestry was found in a Coptic tomb in Upper Egypt. Two types of thread were used, but only the white linen threads have survived, and the red woolen threads have mostly deteriorated. The city of Alexandria was especially known for its ornate crafts and artwork, serving as a cultural and artistic hub in Egypt throughout history. This artwork was found throughout palaces and the Library of Alexandria, producing a rich array of craftsmanship. While the destruction of the Library of Alexandria did erase some of this artwork, there are still remnants of other Coptic and Egyptian crafts in contemporary historical archives.

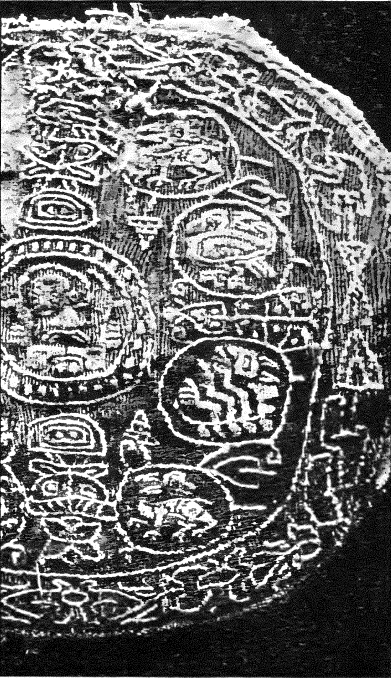
Embroidered tapestry discovered in a Coptic tomb in Upper Egypt

== Edict of Milan ==
The Edict of Milan was a declaration issued by the Roman Emperor Constantine I in 313 AD. This law marked an end of anti-Christianity, ensuring religious toleration and allowing Christians within the Roman Empire, like Coptic Christians in Egypt (since Egypt was a part of the Roman Empire), to practice their faith without fear of persecution. Once Constantine essentially made Christianity legal through this edict, many Pagan practices declined in Egypt, including mummification.

== Council of Nicaea ==
In the 4th century, an Alexandrian presbyter named Arius began a theological dispute about the nature of Christ that spread throughout the Christian world and is now known as Arianism (not to be confused with the Nazi ideology Aryanism). The Ecumenical Council of Nicea 325 AD was convened by the Roman Emperor Constantine I, under the leadership of Hosius of Cordova and Pope Alexander I of Alexandria, to resolve the dispute. The council eventually led to the formulation of the Symbol of Faith, also known as the Nicene Creed. The creed, which is now recited throughout most of the Christian world, was based largely on the teachings put forth by an Egyptian deacon named Athanasius of Alexandria, patriarch of Alexandria and the chief opponent of Arius and his teachings.

== Council of Constantinople ==
In the year 381 AD, Timothy I of Alexandria presided over the second ecumenical council known as the Council of Constantinople. This council resolved theological disputes concerning the nature of the Holy Spirit. It effectively completed the Nicene Creed with this confirmation of the divinity of the Holy Spirit:

We believe in the Holy Spirit, the Lord, the Giver of Life, who proceeds from the Father, who with the Father and the Son is worshipped and glorified who spoke by the Prophets and in One, Holy, Catholic, and Apostolic Church. We confess one Baptism for the remission of sins and we look for the resurrection of the dead and the life of the coming age, Amen.

— Nicene Creed

== Council of Ephesus ==
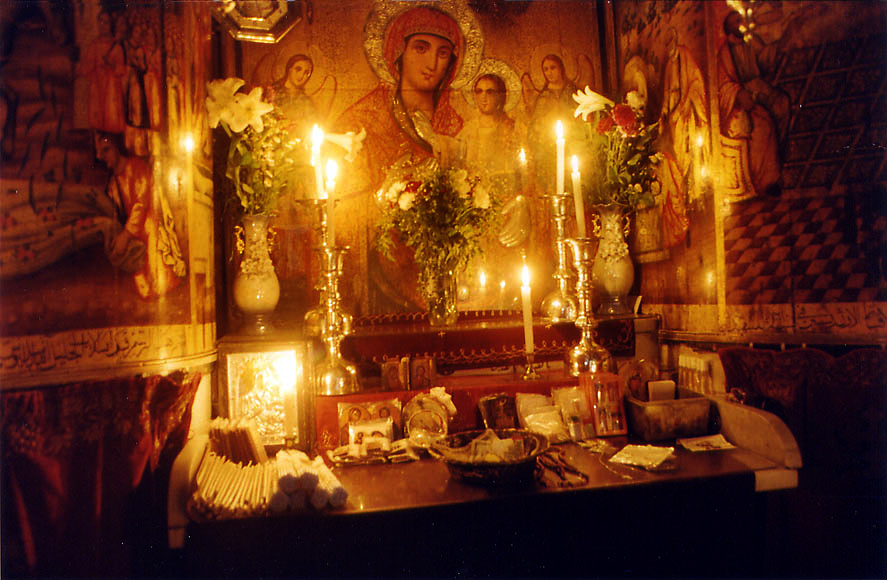
Coptic Icon in the Coptic Altar of the Church of the Holy Sepulchre, Jerusalem

Another theological dispute in the 5th century occurred over the teachings of Nestorius, the Patriarch of Constantinople who taught that God the Logos was not hypostatically joined with human nature, but rather dwelt in the man Jesus. As a consequence of this, he denied the title "Mother of God" (Theotokos) to the Virgin Mary, declaring her instead to be "Mother of Christ" (Christotokos).

When reports of this reached the Apostolic Throne of Saint Mark, Pope Cyril I of Alexandria acted quickly to correct this breach with orthodoxy, requesting that Nestorius repent. When he would not, the Synod of Alexandria met in an emergency session and a unanimous agreement was reached. Pope Cyril I of Alexandria, supported by the entire See, sent a letter to Nestorius known as "The Third Epistle of Saint Cyril to Nestorius." This epistle drew heavily on the established Patristic Constitutions and contained the most famous article of Alexandrian Orthodoxy: "The Twelve Anathemas of Saint Cyril." In these anathemas, Cyril excommunicated anyone who followed the teachings of Nestorius. For example, "Anyone who dares to deny the Holy Virgin the title Theotokos is Anathema!" Nestorius however, still would not repent and so this led to the convening of the First Ecumenical Council of Ephesus (431), over which Cyril I presided.

The First Ecumenical Council of Ephesus affirmed the teachings of Athanasius and confirmed the title of Mary as "Mother of God". It also clearly stated that anyone who separated Christ into two hypostases was anathema, as Cyril had said that there is "One Nature [and One Hypostasis] for God the Word Incarnate" (in Latin: Mia Physis tou Theou Logou Sesarkōmenē). Also, the introduction to the creed was formulated as follows:

We magnify you O Mother of the True Light and we glorify you O saint and Mother of God (Theotokos) for you have borne unto us the Saviour of the world. Glory to you O our Master and King: Christ, the pride of the Apostles, the crown of the martyrs, the rejoicing of the righteous, firmness of the churches and the forgiveness of sins. We proclaim the Holy Trinity in One Godhead: we worship Him, we glorify Him, Lord have mercy, Lord have mercy, Lord bless us, Amen.

— Coptic Orthodox Church, Liturgy of the Word

== Council of Chalcedon ==
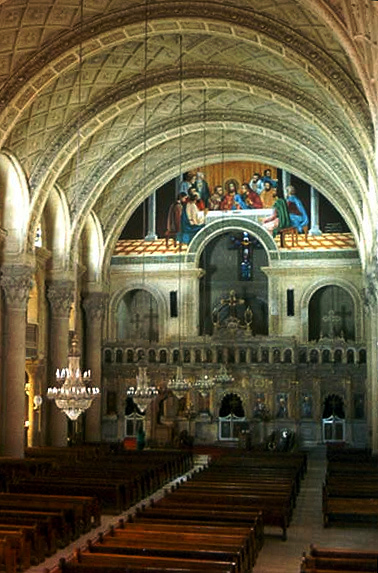
St. Mark Coptic Cathedral in Alexandria

When in 451, Emperor Marcianus attempted to heal divisions in the church, the response of Pope Dioscorus (the Pope of Alexandria who was later exiled) was that the emperor should not intervene in the affairs of the church. It was at Chalcedon that the emperor, through the Imperial delegates, enforced harsh disciplinary measures against Pope Dioscorus in response of his boldness.

The Council of Chalcedon, from the perspective of the Alexandrine Christology, has deviated from the approved Cyrillian terminology and declared that Christ was one hypostasis in two natures. In terms of Christology, the Oriental Orthodox (non-Chalcedonians) understanding is that Christ is "One Nature—the Logos Incarnate," of the full humanity and full divinity. The Chalcedonians understanding is that Christ is recognized in two natures, full humanity and full divinity.Oriental Orthodoxy contends that such a formulation is no different from what the Nestorians teach. This is the doctrinal perception that makes the apparent difference which separated the Oriental Orthodox from the Eastern Orthodox.

The council's findings were rejected by many of the Christians on the fringes of the Byzantine Empire, including Egyptians, Syrians, Armenians, and others. From that point onward, Alexandria would have two patriarchs: the non-Chalcedonian native Egyptian one (now known as the Coptic Pope of Alexandria and Patriarch of All Africa on the Holy Apostolic See of St. Mark) and the "Melkite" or Imperial Patriarch (now known as the Greek Orthodox Pope of Alexandria and Patriarch of All Africa).

Almost the entire Egyptian population rejected the terms of the Council of Chalcedon and remained faithful to the native Egyptian Church (now known as the Coptic Orthodox Church of Alexandria). Those who supported the Chalcedonian definition remained in communion with the other leading churches of Rome and Constantinople, and became the Greek-speaking (and later Arabic-speaking) Rum. The non-Chalcedonian party became what is today called the Oriental Orthodox Churches.

The Coptic Orthodox Church of Alexandria regards itself as having been misunderstood at the Council of Chalcedon. There was an opinion in the church that perhaps the council understood the Church of Alexandria correctly, but wanted to curtail the existing power of the Alexandrine Hierarch. Copts also believe that the Pope of Alexandria was forcibly prevented from attending the third congregation of the council from which he was ousted, apparently the result of a conspiracy tailored by the Roman delegates.

Before the current positive era of Eastern and Oriental Orthodox dialogues, Chalcedonians sometimes used to call the non-Chalcedonians "monophysites," though the Coptic Orthodox Church regards monophysitism as a heresy in reality. The Chalcedonian doctrine in turn came to be known as "dyophysite."

A term that comes closer to Coptic Orthodoxy is miaphysite, which refers to a conjoined nature for Christ (both human and divine, united indivisibly in the Incarnate Logos). The Coptic Orthodox Church of Alexandria believes that Christ is perfect in His divinity and He is perfect in His humanity, but His divinity and His humanity were united in one nature (called "the nature of the incarnate word"), which was reiterated by Cyril of Alexandria. Copts thus believe in two natures ("human" and "divine") that are united in one hypostasis.

== Arab-Muslim conquest of Egypt ==
The Arab-Muslim conquest of Egypt took place in 639 AD, via a military campaign led by Amr ibn al-As of the Rashidun Caliphate. This conquest led to the gradual decline in Christianity within Egypt as more of the population converted to Islam. There were major persecutions of Coptic Christians during and following the reign of the Fatimid caliph Al-Hakim bi-Amr Allah and the reign of the Mamluks. Acceptance of Arabic as a liturgical language took place under the papacy of Pope of Alexandria Gabriel ibn-Turaik.

During Islamic rule, the Copts were required to pay a special tax, called the jizya. The payment of the jizya tax also meant that Copts were required to wear special clothing to distinguish them from Muslims, and that they could practice their own Coptic Law exempt from Shari'a law courts.

== From the 19th century to the present ==
The position of the Copts began to improve early in the 19th century under the stability and tolerance of Muhammad Ali's dynasty. The Coptic community ceased to be regarded by the state as an administrative unit, and the jizya tax was abolished in 1855 under Sa'id Pasha. Shortly thereafter, Christians started to serve in the Egyptian army. The Egyptian Revolution of 1919 later followed, bringing about an uprising against British occupation. Historians consider this revolution to be the first display of a unified Egyptian identity that transcended Muslim and Christian divides. Nonetheless, the Coptic Christian community still remains a marginalized minority in Egypt that experiences issues such as violent attacks, church closures, and institutional discrimination under the Egyptian government (despite efforts at reform).

== See also ==
- Christian Egypt
- Coptic alphabet
- Coptic Saints
- Maria the Copt, a slave girl who became one of Muhammad's wives
