= Pope Cyril VI of Alexandria =

Head of the Coptic Church from 1959 to 1971

Pope Saint Cyril VI
- Pope of Alexandria & Patriarch of the See of St. Mark
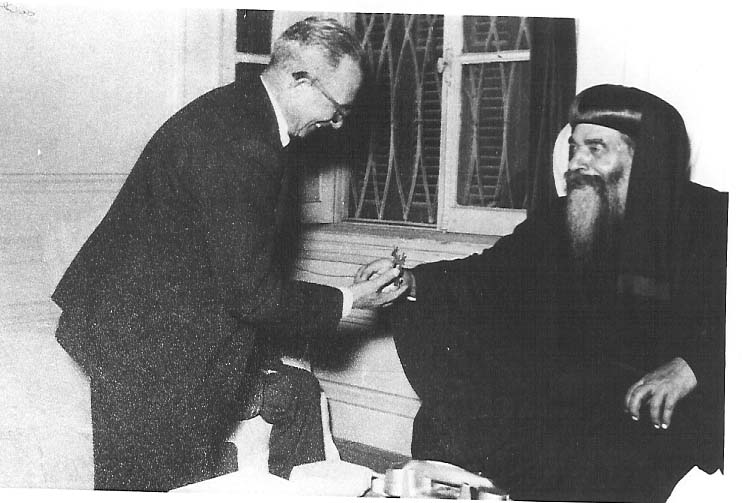
- Papacy began: 10 May 1959 (2 Pashons 1675)
- Papacy ended: 9 March 1971 (30 Meshir 1687)
- Predecessor: Joseph II
- Successor: Shenouda III

Personal details
- Born: Azer Youssef Atta; 2 August 1902 (26 Epip 1618) Damanhur, Beheira, Egypt
- Died: 9 March 1971 (aged 68) (30 Meshir 1687) Cairo, Egypt
- Buried: Monastery of Saint Mina, Alexandria, Egypt
- Denomination: Coptic Orthodox
- Residence: 1959–1968 Saint Mark's Coptic Orthodox Cathedral (Azbakeya) 1968–1971 Saint Mark's Coptic Orthodox Cathedral, Cairo

Sainthood
- Feast day: 30 Meshir (Julian: 24 February) (Gregorian: 9 March)
- Venerated in: Coptic Orthodox Christianity
- Canonized: 13 Paoni 1729 Anno Martyrum (Julian: 7 June) (Gregorian: 20 June 2013); Cairo, Egypt by Pope Tawadros II
- Patronage: Alexandria
- Shrines: Saint. Mina Monastery, Alexandria, Egypt

Papal styles of Pope Cyril VI
- Reference style: His Holiness
- Spoken style: Your Holiness
- Religious style: Pope (disambiguation) and Patriarch
- Posthumous style: Saint

Pope Cyril VI (Note: Coptic: ⲡⲁⲡⲁ ⲁⲃⲃⲁ ⲕⲩⲣⲓⲗⲗⲟⲥ ⲡⲓⲙⲁϩⲋ̅, romanized: Papa Abba Kyrillos VI; Arabic: البابا سيريل السادس) (born Azer Youssef Atta; 2 August 1902 – 9 March 1971) was the 116th pope of Alexandria and patriarch of the See of St. Mark from 10 May 1959 until his death in 1971.

== Early life ==
Azer Youssef Atta was born on 2 August 1902 at Damanhour in the governorate of Beheira in Egypt into a middle-class Coptic Orthodox family. He resigned from a civil service position to become a monk in July 1927 (Paoni–Epip 1943). He passed his probationary period and, on 24 February 1928 (21 Meshir 1944), took his monastic vows at the Paromeos Monastery, assuming the name of Father Mina el-Baramosy (Father Mina of the Paromeos Monastery). He was also known as Father Mina the Elder.

After helping to resolve a conflict between the abbot of El Baramous monastery and some of its elder monks, he requested from Pope John XIX of Alexandria to live in one of the windmills built in Old Cairo during the reign of Muhammad Ali of Egypt. He spent the start of his time in the windmill with no doors or a roof out of love for solitude. He was then pressured by the priests and an "Archon" (lay-leader) of a nearby church to renovate the windmill in order to be a more suitable environment to live. The ground floor served as a place for Fr Mina to live and the upper level he placed a sanctuary with an altar to pray daily liturgies in. He stayed in the windmill for some time before his relocation to the Monastery of Saint Samuel the Confessor. After his death, a church was built around the windmill.

In 1944 he was nominated to become the abbot of the Monastery of Saint Samuel the Confessor and played a vital role in building a centre for the monastery in El Zawra, renovating the ancient churches of the monastery and building new monk cells.

In 1947 (1963–1964), Father Mina built the Church of Saint Mina in Cairo. He also used to pray in the Church of the Holy Virgin in Babylon El-Darag before assuming the papacy.

== Coptic Pope ==
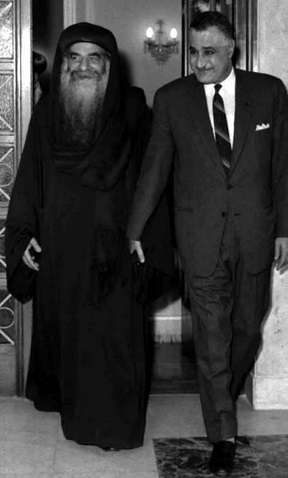
Pope Cyril VI with President Gamal Abdel Nasser, May 1967

Father Mina became Pope of Alexandria on 10 May 1959 (2 Pashons 1975). In accordance with the old Coptic church tradition, Pope Cyril VI was the only monk in the 20th century A.D./17th century A.M. to be chosen for papacy without having been a bishop /Metropolitan first. Before him, there were three bishops / Metropolitans who became Popes of Alexandria: Pope John XIX (1928–1942), Pope Macarius III (1942–1944) and Pope Joseph II (1946–1956). After him, Pope Shenouda III was also a bishop before becoming Pope.

During his enthronement ceremony, he, through another bishop, addressed the people of the Coptic Church with the following words:

But as for you, I hope to open my heart to you, that you might perceive the deep love for all therein; this is the love that emanates from the heart of our Saviour who loved us and redeemed us with His Blood. And so, I beseech all of you to persist in raising prayers for the safety of the Church and for my weakness, and for all the labouring servants.

In November 1959, he laid the foundation stone of the new Monastery of Saint Mina in the Desert of Mariout.

Cyril's papacy also marked the apparitions of the Virgin Mary in Zeitoun, Egypt (starting on 2 April 1968/24 [Paremhat 1984]).

The Seat of Pope Cyril VI was initially located in Saint Mark's Coptic Orthodox Cathedral in Azbakeya, Cairo. However, in 1968 he built the Saint Mark's Coptic Orthodox Cathedral in Abbasseya, also in Cairo, which replaced it. Its inauguration was attended by Egyptian President Nasser, Ethiopian Emperor Haile Selassie, and delegates from most other churches.

In June 1968 (Pashons–Paoni 1984), Pope Cyril received the relics of Saint Mark the Evangelist and Apostle, which had been taken from Alexandria to Venice over eleven centuries earlier. The relics were interred beneath the newly completed cathedral.

Pope Cyril died on 9 March 1971 (30 Meshir 1987), after a short illness. His funeral was held in the Saint Mark's Coptic Orthodox Cathedral in Abbasseya. He was buried in a temporary tomb under the altar of the cathedral. His body was then relocated according to his will to the Monastery of Saint Mina in Mariut by Pope Shenouda III in November 1971. Pope Shenouda III spoke about his predecessor: "There is no man in all the history of the church like Pope Cyril VI, who was able to pray so many liturgies. He prayed more than 12,000 liturgies. This matter never happened before in the history of the Popes of Alexandria or the world, or even among the monks. He was wondrous in his prayers." On 20 June 2013 (13 Paoni 1729), 42 years after his death, he was canonised as a saint by the Holy Synod of the Coptic Orthodox Church, along with Archdeacon Habib Girgis.

== Inter-Church relations ==
Pope Cyril VI elevated the Archbishop of the Ethiopian Orthodox Tewahedo Church to the title of Patriarch-Catholicos. Abuna Basilios, who was the first Ethiopian to be appointed Archbishop of Ethiopia by Pope Joseph II, became Ethiopia's first Patriarch. Pope Cyril VI was awarded the Grand Cordon of the Star of Solomon by Emperor Haile Selassie in gratitude.

In January 1965 (Koiak–Tobi 1981), Pope Cyril VI presided over the Committee of Coptic Orthodox Churches in Addis Ababa, the first non-Chalcedonian ecumenical synod of these churches held in modern times.

== See also ==
- List of Coptic Orthodox Popes of Alexandria
- List of Copts
- List of Egyptians
- Battle of Anchem

== Notes ==
Oriental Orthodox titles
Preceded by Joseph II	Coptic Pope; 1959–1971	Succeeded by Shenouda III
