= Pope Joseph II of Alexandria =

Head of the Coptic Church from 1946 to 1956

- Pope of Alexandria & Patriarch of the See of St. Mark
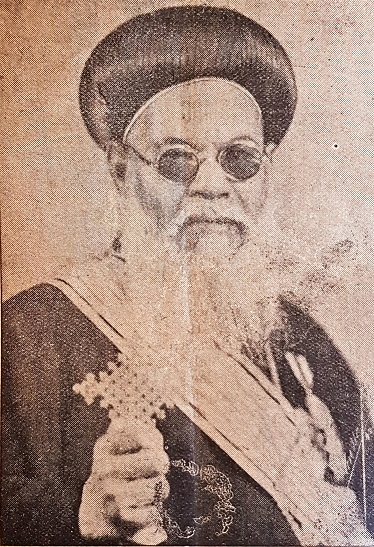
- Papacy began: 1946
- Papacy ended: 14 November 1956
- Predecessor: Macarius III
- Successor: Cyril VI

Personal details
- Born: Damanhour, Egypt
- Died: 14 November 1956 Cairo, Egypt
- Buried: Saint Mark's Coptic Orthodox Cathedral (Azbakeya)
- Denomination: Coptic Orthodox Christian
- Residence: Saint Mark's Coptic Orthodox Cathedral (Azbakeya)

Pope Joseph II of Alexandria (Abba Yousab II) was the 115th Pope of Alexandria & Patriarch of the See of St. Mark.

== The Pope ==
He was the metropolitan of Girga before becoming the pope and he is the third bishop / metropolitan to become a pope after Popes John XIX (1928–1942) and Macarius III (1942–1945).

The Seat of the Pope in Cairo during his papacy remained in the Saint Mark's Coptic Orthodox Cathedral in Azbakeya, Cairo.

== Ethiopia ==
He is revered in Ethiopia for having appointed the first Ethiopian-born metropolitan archbishop for the Ethiopian Orthodox Tewahido Church, and granting that church full autocephaly. His deposition by the Coptic Synod was not accepted by the Ethiopian Church, and the name of Pope Joseph II was still raised in church services in Ethiopia as patriarch long after he was removed from office.

== Work ==
During Pope Yosab II's papacy the Institute of Coptic Studies was founded in 1954. by the Coptic Orthodox Church and based in Cairo.

Between the years 1950–1952 A.D., in the time of Pope Yosab II, the building of Saint Mark's Church in Alexandria was pulled down – as it was old – and another bigger building was built with reinforced concrete after the basilique style. The six marble pillars were transferred into the outer entrance of the church. The iconostasis was accurately cut into parts, each part given a number, and then it was carefully returned to where it was originally. The two minarets were not pulled down as they were reinforced with concrete and were decorated with beautiful Coptic engravings. Two new bells – brought from Italy – were provided one for each minaret.

== Removal from office ==
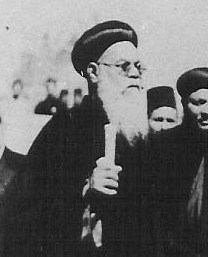

Pope Yousab II proved to be a weak and indecisive patriarch. During his reign, there were numerous power struggles within the church and corruption became widespread. Yousab's valet and secretary, Malik, acted as an intermediary between the Pope and the rest of the Church, and gradually assumed much of the Pope's power. According to various reports, Malik charged large sums of money for an audience with the Pope and sold at least sixteen of the nineteen episcopal appointments made during Yousab II's reign. Accusations of corruption and simony against Yousab II became common in the Egyptian press during this time, stirring up discontent among the Coptic laity.

In July 1954, a group of political activists known as the Umma al-Qibtiya (Society of the Coptic Nation) staged a protest demanding that Yousab II resign. On July 25, 1954, the protest culminated in the group kidnapping the Pope and taking him to the Coptic Convent of Saint George in Old Cairo where he was forced to sign a letter of abdication. However, the police were able to rescue the Pope and return him to the patriarchal residence.

A year later, the Church's Synod and the General Congregation Council agreed to remove Pope Yousab II from office, stating that he was not fit to execute his duties. He retired to one of the monasteries and in his last days he was transferred to the Coptic Hospital in Azbakeya, Cairo where he died in 1956.

The Church was managed by a committee formed of three of the Metropolitans from 1956 to 1959. The committee included Metropolitans Mikhail of Assiut, Metropolitan Agapius Bishop of Dairut and Qasqam and Metropolitan Benyamine, Bishop of Monufia.

Oriental Orthodox titles
Preceded by Macarius III	Coptic Pope; 1946–1956	Succeeded by Vacant (1956–1959) followed by Cyril VI
