= Pope Macarius III of Alexandria =

Head of the Coptic Church from 1944 to 1945

Saint Macarius III of Alexandria
- Pope of Alexandria & Patriarch of the See of St. Mark
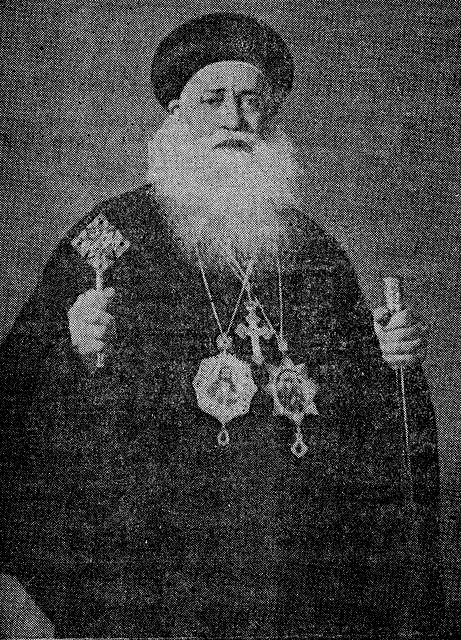
- Native name: البابا مكاريوس الثالث
- Papacy began: 19 February 1944
- Papacy ended: 31 August 1945
- Predecessor: John XIX
- Successor: Joseph II

Personal details
- Born: 18 February 1872 El-Mahalla El-Kubra, Egypt
- Died: 31 August 1945 (aged 73) Cairo, Egypt
- Buried: Saint Mark's Coptic Orthodox Cathedral (Azbakeya)
- Denomination: Coptic Orthodox Christian
- Residence: Saint Mark's Coptic Orthodox Cathedral (Azbakeya)

Sainthood
- Feast day: 31 August (25 Mesra in the Coptic calendar)

Papal styles of Saint Macarius III
- Reference style: His Holiness
- Spoken style: Your Holiness
- Religious style: Pope and Patriarch
- Posthumous style: Saint

Pope Macarius III of Alexandria (Abba Macari III) was the 114th Pope of Alexandria and Patriarch of the See of St. Mark.

Before becoming a pope, he was the Metropolitan of Asyut in Egypt. He is the second metropolitan of an Eparchy to become a pope in the history of the Coptic Orthodox Church of Alexandria. The first metropolitan to become a pope was John XIX.

On several occasions, Habib Elmasry, secretary of the General Congregation Council (Elmagles Elmelly Ela'am) of the Coptic Orthodox Church of Alexandria, vocally disagreed with Macarius's papal appointment. His daughter, historian Iris Habib Elmasry, documented these incidents in her book on the church's history.

During his papacy, Macarius ordained no bishops or metropolitans. This was interpreted as an indication of his regret at accepting the position, despite being a metropolitan beforehand.

On 22 February 1944, Macarius issued a document describing the church's intention to repair monasteries, to update monks scientifically and spiritually, and to hold monastic heads accountable. This led to a major split between the Holy Synod and General Congregation Council (Elmagles Elmelly Ela'am).

On 7 June 1944, the Holy Synod submitted an appeal to the pope and to the Minister of Justice on the personal status law for non-Muslims Egyptians, as they felt it contradicted a church canon and affected two of the holy mysteries of the Church: marriage and priesthood. As the conflict continued, The Holy Synod and General Congregation Council could not agree. Failing to reconcile them, Macarius abandoned the capital headquarters and went into exile in Helwan. He later went to the Eastern monasteries, accompanied by bishops, and settled in the Monastery of Saint Anthony in the Red Sea. He then went to the Monastery of Saint Paul the Anchorite. These changes were painful among the Coptic people. When the prime minister learned of the matter, he worked to resolve it, and the pope returned.

Oriental Orthodox titles
Preceded by John XIX	Coptic Pope; 1944–1945	Succeeded by Joseph II
