= Pope John XIX of Alexandria =

Head of the Coptic Church from 1928 to 1942

- Pope of Alexandria & Patriarch of the See of St. Mark
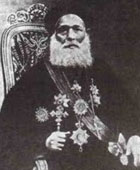
- Native name: البابا يوأنس التاسع عشر
- Papacy began: 16 December 1928
- Papacy ended: 21 June 1942
- Predecessor: Cyril V
- Successor: Macarius III

Personal details
- Born: 1855 Dair Tasa, Asyut, Egypt
- Died: 21 June 1942 (aged 86–87) Egypt
- Buried: Saint Mark's Coptic Orthodox Cathedral (Azbakeya)
- Denomination: Coptic Orthodox Christian
- Residence: Saint Mark's Coptic Orthodox Cathedral (Azbakeya)

Pope John XIX of Alexandria (1855–1942) was the Coptic Patriarch of Alexandria, Pope of Alexandria and Patriarch of the See of St. Mark from 1928 until his death in 1942.

== A monk ==
He joined the Paromeos Monastery in the Nitrian Desert as a monk and was sent to Greece to study theology. Afterwards, Pope Cyril V appointed him a metropolitan.

== Enthroning a Bishop as Pope ==
Before becoming a pope, John XIX was the Metropolitan of Al Beheira in Egypt; he is the first ever bishop/metropolitan of an eparchy to become a pope in the history of the Coptic Orthodox Church; before him the tradition was to nominate a monk to the papal position.

Some argue that the choice of bishop as pope (and bishop) of Alexandria is not canonical (against Canon 15 of the First Council of Nicaea and other Church councils/canons). This issue has caused an ongoing dispute since 1928 in the Coptic Orthodox Church.

Oriental Orthodox titles
Preceded by Marcos II	Bishop of Beheira; 1887–1928	Succeeded by Tomas
Preceded by Ionannes I	Bishop of Monufia; 1894–1928	Succeeded by Demetirus
Preceded by Cyril V	Coptic Pope; 1928–1942	Succeeded by Macarius III
