= Coptic Orthodox Church =

Christian denomination based in Egypt

Coptic Orthodox Church
- ϯⲉⲕ̀ⲕⲗⲏⲥⲓⲁ ⲛ̀ⲣⲉⲙⲛ̀ⲭⲏⲙⲓ ⲛ̀ⲟⲣⲑⲟⲇⲟⲝⲟⲥ (Coptic) الكنيسة القبطية الأرثوذكسية (Arabic)
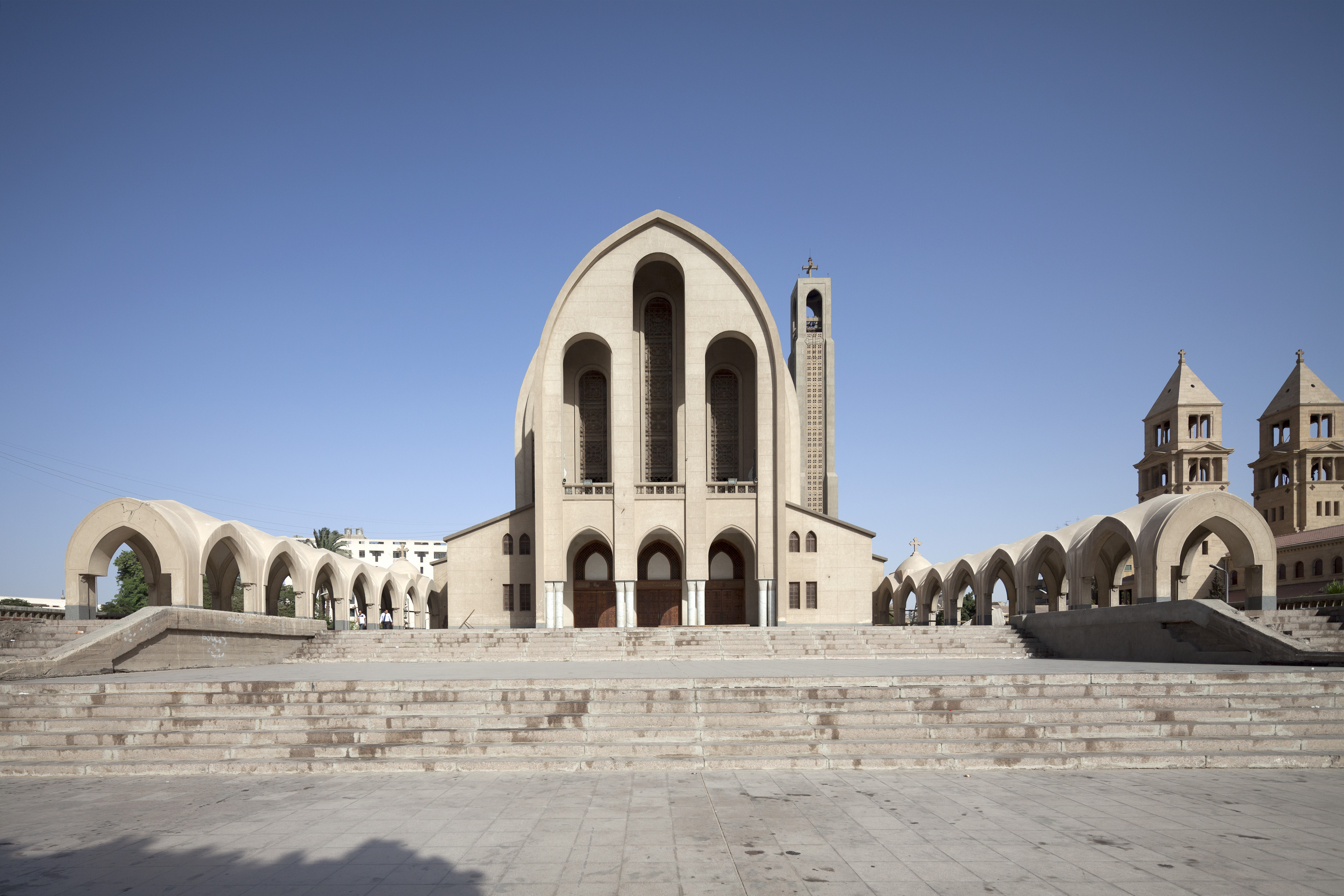
- Saint Mark's Cathedral, Cairo, Egypt
- Type: Autocephaly
- Classification: Christian
- Orientation: Oriental Orthodox
- Scripture: Septuagint, New Testament, Coptic versions
- Theology: Oriental Orthodox theology
- Polity: Episcopal
- Governance: Holy Synod of the Coptic Orthodox Church
- Pope: Tawadros II
- Region: Egypt, Libya, Sudan, Middle East, and diaspora
- Language: Coptic, Greek, Arabic, Dialectal Arabic, Tamazight (minority)
- Liturgy: Coptic Rite
- Headquarters: Saint Mark's Coptic Orthodox Cathedral, Cairo, Egypt
- Founder: St. Mark the Evangelist
- Origin: 42 A.D; Alexandria, Egypt
- Separations: Coptic Catholic Church (1895); British Orthodox Church (2015)
- Members: 10 million
- Other names: Coptic Church; Coptic Orthodox Patriarchate of Alexandria
- Official website: https://copticorthodox.church/en

The Coptic Orthodox Church, (Note: Coptic: Ϯⲉⲕ̀ⲕⲗⲏⲥⲓⲁ ⲛ̀ⲣⲉⲙⲛ̀ⲭⲏⲙⲓ ⲛ̀ⲟⲣⲑⲟⲇⲟⲝⲟⲥ, romanized: Ti-eklisia en-remenkimi en-orthodhoxos, lit. 'the Egyptian Orthodox Church'; Arabic: الكنيسة القبطية الأرثوذكسية, romanized: al-Kanīsa al-Qibṭiyya al-ʾUrthūdhuksiyya) also known as the Coptic Orthodox Patriarchate of Alexandria, is an Oriental Orthodox Christian church based in Egypt. The head of the Coptic Orthodox Church and of the See of Alexandria is the pope of Alexandria on the holy apostolic see of Saint Mark. The current pope of the Coptic Orthodox Church is Pope Tawadros II (Coptic: Ⲑⲉⲟ́ⲇⲛⲣⲟⲥ II).

The see of Alexandria is titular. The Coptic pope presides from Saint Mark's Coptic Orthodox Cathedral in the Abbassia district in Cairo. The church follows the Coptic Rite for its liturgy, prayer and devotional patrimony. Adherents of the Coptic Orthodox Church make up Egypt's largest and most significant minority population, and the largest population of Christians in the Middle East and North Africa (MENA). They make up the largest share of the approximately 5.3 million Christians in Egypt.

According to Coptic tradition, the Coptic Orthodox Church was established by Mark the Evangelist, a companion of the Apostles, during the middle of the 1st century (c. AD 42). Due to disputes concerning the nature of Christ, the Oriental Orthodox Churches were in schism after the Council of Chalcedon in AD 451.

After AD 639, Egypt was ruled by its Islamic conquerors from Arabia. In the 12th century, the church relocated its seat from Alexandria to Cairo. The same century also saw the Copts become a religious minority. During the 14th and 15th centuries, Nubian Christianity was supplanted by Islam. In the 19th and 20th centuries, the larger body of ethnic Egyptian Christians began to call themselves Coptic Orthodox, to distinguish themselves from the Catholic Copts and from the Eastern Orthodox, who are mostly Greek. In 1959, the Ethiopian Orthodox Tewahedo Church was granted autocephaly. This was extended to the Eritrean Orthodox Tewahedo Church in 1998 following the successful Eritrean War of Independence from Ethiopia.

== History ==
=== Apostolic foundation ===
According to tradition, the Coptic Church was founded by St. Mark the Evangelist c. AD 42; it regards itself as the subject of many prophecies in the Old Testament.

==== Coptic language in the church ====
The Coptic language is a universal language used in Coptic churches in every country. It descends from Ancient Egyptian and uses the Coptic alphabet, a script descended from the Greek alphabet with added characters derived from the Demotic script. Today, the Bohairic dialect of Coptic is used primarily for liturgical purposes. Many of the hymns in the liturgy are in Coptic and have been passed down for many centuries. The language is used to preserve Egypt's dominant language prior to the Arab conquest, after which Coptic was banned by Arab rulers and gradually supplanted by Arabic. Today, most Copts speak Arabic as their first language, the official language of Egypt. Hence, Arabic is also used in church services nowadays. The service books, though written in Coptic, have Arabic text in parallel columns.

==== Catechetical School of Alexandria ====
The Catechetical School of Alexandria is the oldest catechetical school in the world. Jerome records that the Christian School of Alexandria was founded by Mark himself.

The theological college of the catechetical school was re-established in 1893.

The school became a leading center of the allegorical method of biblical interpretation, espoused rapprochement between Greek culture and the Christian faith, and attempted to assert orthodox Christian teachings against heterodox views in an era of doctrinal flux.

==== Council of Nicaea ====
In the 4th century, an Alexandrian presbyter named Arius began a theological dispute about the nature of Christ that spread throughout the Christian world and is now known as Arianism. The Council of Nicea in AD 325 was convened by Emperor Constantine I after Pope Alexander I of Alexandria proposed holding a council to respond to heresies. A council under the presidency of Hosius of Cordova attempted to resolve the dispute. This eventually led to the formulation of the Symbol of Faith, also known as the Nicene Creed.

==== Council of Constantinople ====
In AD 381, Pope Timothy I of Alexandria presided over the second ecumenical council known as the First Council of Constantinople, to judge Macedonius, who denied the Divinity of the Holy Spirit. This council completed the Nicene Creed with this confirmation of the divinity of the Holy Spirit:

We believe in the Holy Spirit, the Lord, the Giver of Life, who proceeds from the Father, who with the Father and the Son is worshiped and glorified who spoke by the Prophets and in One, Holy, Catholic, and Apostolic church. We confess one Baptism for the remission of sins and we look for the resurrection of the dead and the life of the coming age, Amen

==== Council of Ephesus ====
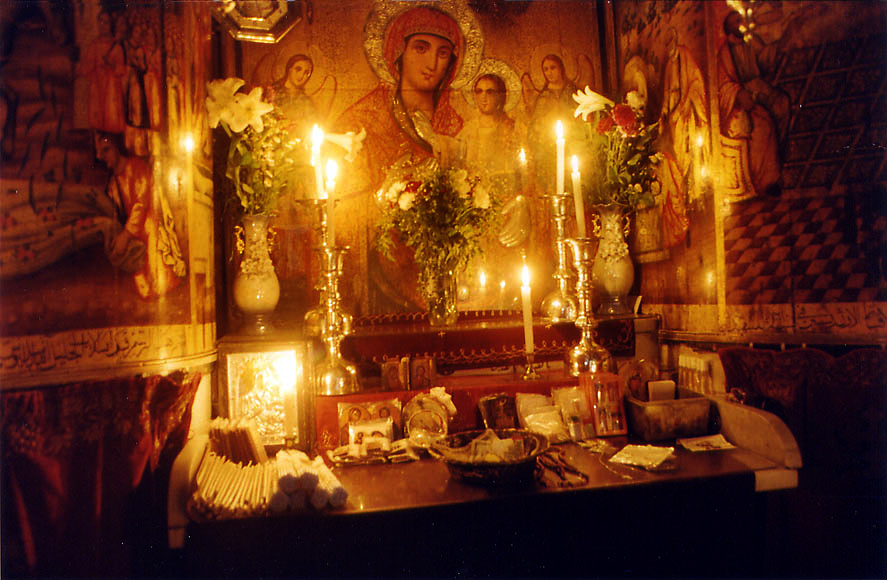
Coptic Icon in the Coptic Altar of the Church of the Holy Sepulchre, Jerusalem

Another theological dispute in the 5th century occurred over the teachings of Nestorius, the patriarch of Constantinople who taught that God the Word was not hypostatically joined with human nature, but rather dwelt in the man Jesus. As a consequence of this, he denied the title "Mother of God" (Theotokos) to the Virgin Mary, declaring her instead to be "Mother of Christ" Christotokos.

The council confirmed the teachings of Athanasius and confirmed the title of Mary as "Mother of God". It also clearly stated that anyone who separated Christ into two hypostases was anathema, as Cyril had said that there is "One Nature for God the Word Incarnate" (Mia Physis tou Theou Logou Sesarkōmenē). The introduction to the creed is formulated as follows:

We magnify you O Mother of the True Light and we glorify you O saint and Mother of God (Theotokos) for you have borne unto us the Saviour of the world. Glory to you O our Master and King: Christ, the pride of the Apostles, the crown of the martyrs, the rejoicing of the righteous, firmness of the churches and the forgiveness of sins. We proclaim the Holy Trinity in One Godhead: we worship Him, we glorify Him, Lord have mercy, Lord have mercy, Lord bless us, Amen.

==== Council of Chalcedon ====
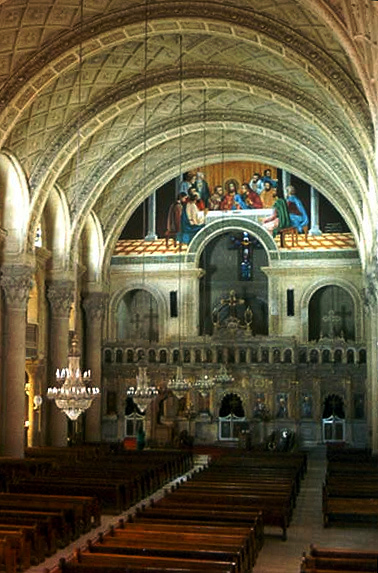
St. Mark Coptic Cathedral in Alexandria

The church of Alexandria was part in communion with the rest of Christendom until the Council of Chalcedon. When, in AD 451, Emperor Marcian attempted to heal divisions in the church, the response of Pope Dioscorus–the Pope of Alexandria who was later exiled–was that the emperor should not intervene in the affairs of the church. It was at Chalcedon that the emperor, through the imperial delegates, enforced harsh disciplinary measures against Pope Dioscorus in response to his boldness. In AD 449, Pope Dioscorus headed the 2nd Council of Ephesus, called the "Robber Council" by Chalcedonian historians. It held to the Miaphysite formula which upheld the Christology of "One Incarnate Nature of God the Word" (Byzantine Greek: μία φύσις Θεοῦ Λόγου σεσαρκωμένη, romanized: mia physis Theou Logou sesarkōmenē).

In terms of Christology, the Oriental Orthodox (Non-Chalcedonians) understanding is that Christ is "One Nature—the Logos Incarnate," of the full humanity and full divinity. The Chalcedonians' understanding is that Christ is recognized in two natures, full humanity and full divinity. Oriental Orthodoxy contends that such a formulation is no different from what the Nestorians teach.

From that point onward, Alexandria would have two patriarchs: the non-Chalcedonian native Egyptian one, now known as the Coptic pope of Alexandria and patriarch of All Africa on the Holy Apostolic See of St. Mark, and the Melkite or Imperial patriarch, now known as the Greek Orthodox patriarch of Alexandria.

Almost the entire Egyptian population rejected the terms of the Council of Chalcedon and remained faithful to the native Egyptian Church (now known as the Coptic Orthodox Church).

By anathematizing Pope Leo because of the tone and content of his tome, as per Alexandrine Theology perception, Pope Dioscorus was found guilty of doing so without due process; in other words, the Tome of Leo was not a subject of heresy in the first place, but it was a question of questioning the reasons behind not having it either acknowledged or read at the Second Council of Ephesus in AD 449. Pope Dioscorus of Alexandria was never labeled as a heretic by the council's canons. Copts also believe that the pope of Alexandria was forcibly prevented from attending the third congregation of the council from which he was ousted, apparently the result of a conspiracy tailored by the Roman delegates.

Before the current positive era of Eastern and Oriental Orthodox dialogues, Chalcedonians sometimes used to call the non-Chalcedonians "Monophysites", though the Coptic Orthodox Church in reality regards Monophysitism as a heresy. The Chalcedonian doctrine in turn came to be known as "Dyophysite". A term that comes closer to Coptic Orthodoxy is Miaphysite, which refers to a conjoined nature for Christ, both human and divine, united indivisibly in the Incarnate Logos.

=== From Chalcedon to the Arab conquest of Egypt ===
==== Muslim conquest of Egypt ====
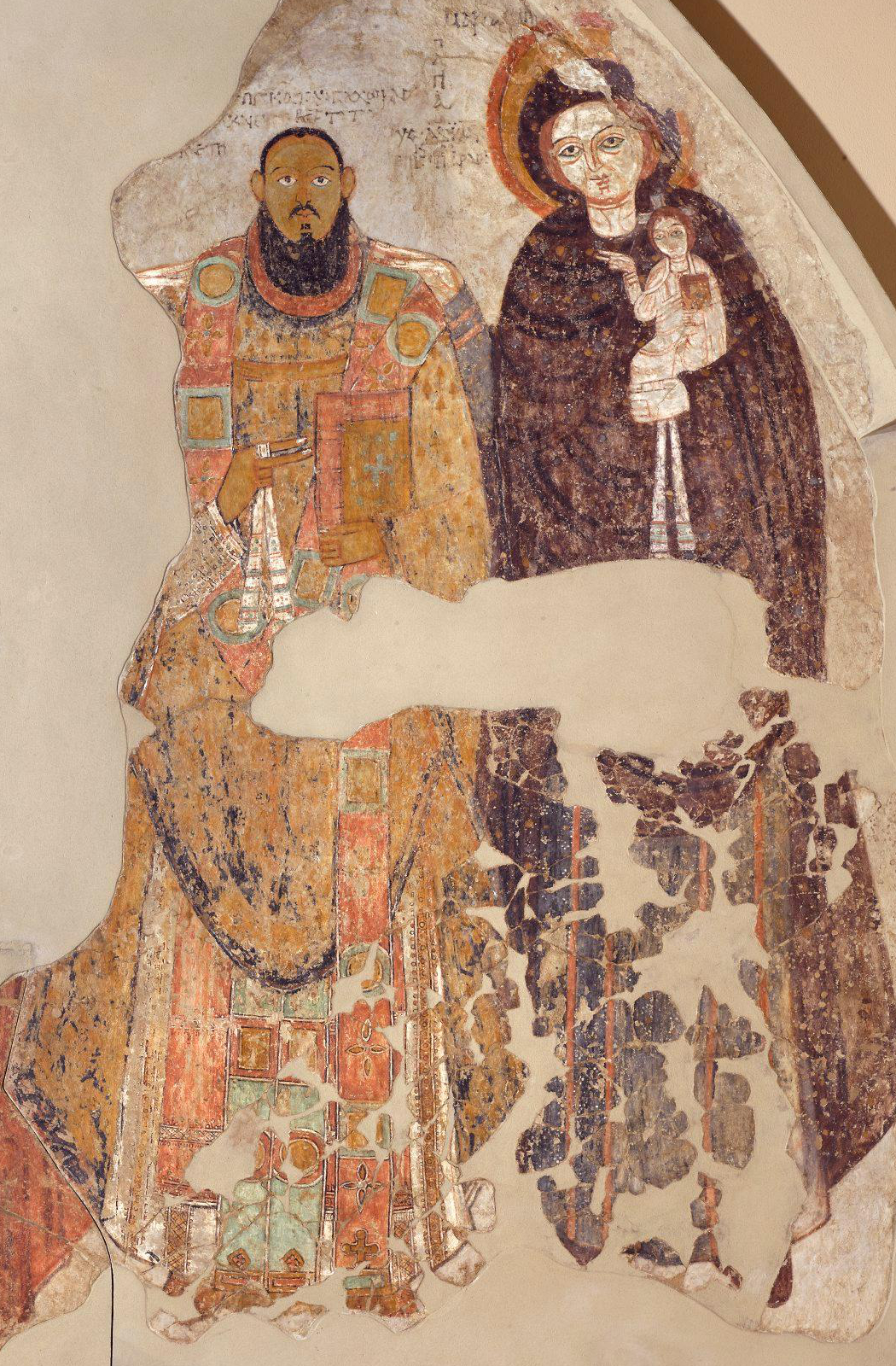
Makurian wall painting depicting a Nubian bishop and Virgin Mary (11th century)

The Muslim invasion of Egypt took place in AD 639. Relying on eyewitness testimony, Bishop John of Nikiu in his Chronicle provides a graphic account of the invasion from a Coptic perspective. Although the Chronicle has only been preserved in an Ethiopic (Ge'ez) text, some scholars believe that it was originally written in Coptic. John's account is critical of the invaders who he says "despoiled the Egyptians of their possessions and dealt cruelly with them", and he details the atrocities committed by the Muslims against the native population during the conquest:

And when with great toil and exertion they had cast down the walls of the city, they forthwith made themselves masters of it, and put to the sword thousands of its inhabitants and of the soldiers, and they gained an enormous booty, and took the women and children captive and divided them amongst themselves, and they made that city a desolation.

Though critical of the Muslim commander (Amr ibn al-As), who, during the campaign, he says "had no mercy on the Egyptians, and did not observe the covenant they had made with him, for he was of a barbaric race", he does note that following the completion of the conquest, Amr "took none of the property of the Churches, and he committed no act of spoilation or plunder, and he preserved them throughout all his days."

Despite the political upheaval, the Egyptian population remained mainly Christian. However, gradual conversions to Islam over the centuries had changed Egypt from a Christian to a largely Muslim country by the end of the 12th century. Another scholar writes that a combination of "repression of Coptic revolts", Arab-Muslim immigration, and Coptic conversion to Islam resulted in the demographic decline of the Copts. Egypt's Umayyad rulers taxed Christians at a higher rate than Muslims, driving merchants towards Islam and undermining the economic base of the Coptic Church. Although the Coptic Church did not disappear, the Umayyad tax policies made it difficult for the church to retain the Egyptian elites.

==== Under Islamic rule (640–1800) ====
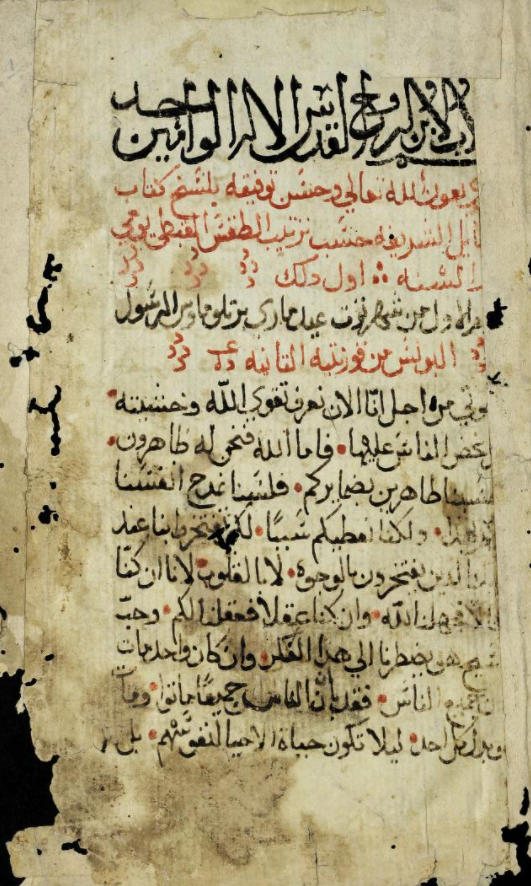
Arabic Coptic Prayer book, 1760

In 969, Egypt entered the Fatimid dynasty (in Egypt from 969 to 1171), who adopted a largely favorable attitude toward the Christians. The major exception to this was the persecution led by Caliph al-Hakim between 1004 and 1013, which included clothing regulations, prohibition of publicly celebrating Christian festivals, and dismissal of Christian and Jewish functionaries. However, at the end of his reign al-Hakim rescinded these measures, allowing the Copts to regain privileged positions within the administration.

The Coptic patriarchal residence moved from Alexandria to Cairo during the patriarchate of Cyril II (1078–92). This move was at the demand of the grand vizier Badr al-Jamali, who insisted that the pope establish himself in the capital. When Saladin entered Egypt in 1163, this ushered in a government focused on defending Sunni Islam. Christians were again discriminated against, and meant to show modesty in their religious ceremonies and buildings.

During the Ottoman period, Copts were classified alongside other Oriental Orthodox and Nestorian peoples under the Armenian millet.

In 1798, the French invaded Egypt unsuccessfully and the British helped the Turks to regain power over Egypt under the Muhammad Ali dynasty.

=== From the 19th century to the 1952 revolution ===
The position of Copts began to improve early in the 19th century under the stability and tolerance of the Muhammad Ali Dynasty. The Coptic community ceased to be regarded by the state as an administrative unit. In 1855 the jizya tax was abolished by Sa'id Pasha. Shortly thereafter, the Copts started to serve in the Egyptian army.

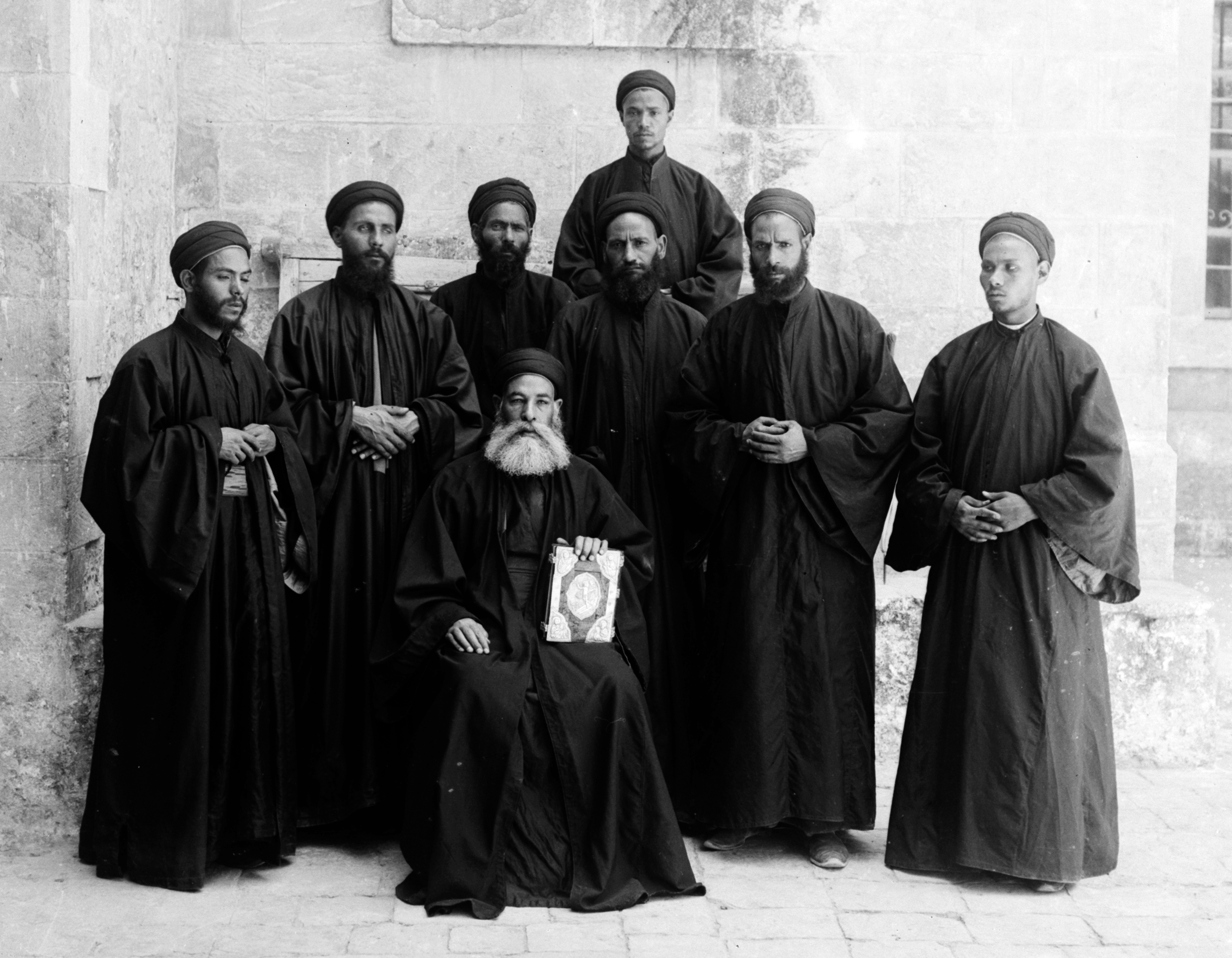
Coptic monks, between 1898 and 1914

Towards the end of the 19th century, the Coptic Church underwent phases of new development. In 1853, Pope Cyril IV established the first modern Coptic schools, including the first Egyptian school for girls. He also founded a printing press, which was only the second national press in the country. The pope established very friendly relations with other denominations, to the extent that when the Greek Patriarch in Egypt had to absent himself from the country for a long period of time, he left his church under the guidance of the Coptic patriarch.

The Theological College of the School of Alexandria was reestablished in 1893. It began its new history with five students, one of whom was later to become its dean. Today it has campuses in Alexandria and Cairo, and in various dioceses throughout Egypt, as well as outside Egypt. It has campuses in New Jersey, Los Angeles, Sydney, Melbourne, and London, where potential clergymen and other qualified men and women study many subjects, including theology, church history, missionary studies, and the Coptic language.

=== From the mid 20th to the early 21st centuries ===
In 1959, the Ethiopian Orthodox Tewahedo Church was granted its first own patriarch Abuna Basilios by Pope Cyril VI. Furthermore, the Eritrean Orthodox Tewahedo Church similarly became independent of the Ethiopian Orthodox Tewahedo Church in 1994, when four bishops were consecrated by Pope Shenouda III of Alexandria to form the basis of a local Holy Synod of the Eritrean Church. In 1998, the Eritrean Orthodox Tewahedo Church gained its autocephaly from the Coptic Orthodox Church when its first patriarch was enthroned by Pope Shenouda III.

In the 1970s, the Primitive Apostolic Orthodox Church of the Syro-Byzantine Tradition—an Independent Orthodox jurisdiction—under Jan Frederik Nico Blom van Assendelft-Altland, was received into the Coptic Orthodox Church. Altland (then Marcos) was conditionally consecrated by Shenouda III as metropolitan for Toulon and Marseille, and he was originally consecrated by Josef Maria Thiesen in 1953.

Since the 1980s theologians from the Oriental (non-Chalcedonian) Orthodox and Eastern (Chalcedonian) Orthodox churches have been meeting in a bid to resolve theological differences, and have concluded that many of the differences are caused by the two groups using different terminology to describe the same thing.

In the 1990s, the Orthodox Church of the British Isles (formerly the Catholicate of the West) joined the Coptic Orthodox Church as a diocese named the British Orthodox Church. By 2015, it formally separated with the Coptic Orthodox Church as a non-canonical, autocephalous church.

In the summer of 2001, the Coptic Orthodox and Greek Orthodox patriarchates of Alexandria agreed to mutually recognize baptisms performed in each other's churches, making re-baptisms unnecessary, and to recognize the sacrament of marriage as celebrated by the other.

In Tahrir Square, Cairo, on Wednesday 2 February 2011, Coptic Christians joined hands to provide a protective cordon around their Muslim neighbors during salat (prayers) in the midst of the 2011 Egyptian Revolution.

==== Continued persecution into the 21st century ====
While Copts have cited instances of persecution throughout their history, Human Rights Watch has noted growing religious intolerance and sectarian violence against Coptic Christians in recent years, and a failure by the Egyptian government to effectively investigate properly and prosecute those responsible. More than a hundred Egyptian copts were killed in sectarian clashes from 2011 to 2017, and many homes and businesses destroyed. In Minya, 77 cases of sectarian attacks on Copts between 2011 and 2016 were documented by the Egyptian Initiative for Personal Rights. Coptic Christian women and girls are often abducted and disappear.

In 2015, 21 men traveled to Libya to support their families. There, they would be kidnapped and beheaded by the Islamic State in Libya.

==== Continued church reforms ====
Under Pope Shenouda III, from 1971 to 2012, the church underwent a large transformation. Writing in 2013, the theologian Samuel Tadros stated "Today's Coptic Church as an institution is built solely on his vision". For the first time in its history, the synod codified its internal laws. It also established numerous coptic institutions within and outside of Egypt. Shenouda raised the number of bishops from 26 to 117 and ordained hundreds of priests, which greatly reduced the influence of any one bishop. Shenouda also instituted a yearly meeting of the synod, which greatly expanded the number of laws governing the church. This included instituting church curriculums for the education of new priests, new deacons, and newly weds. For the first time in the Coptic Church's modern history, women could become ordained as deacons. The synod also adopted a model for community development, dramatically increasing the scope of community services provided by the church, including: hospitals, adult literacy schools, orphanages, libraries, and community centres. Much of this work was fuelled by donations from wealthy Coptic industrialists and Copts from abroad. Shenouda also held talks with the Eastern Orthodox and Roman Catholic churches, in an effort to promote ecumenism. On 10 May 1973, Shenouda visited the Vatican, where a joint Christological declaration was issued jointly by the Coptic Orthodox and Catholic churches.

Pope Shenouda also increased the church's involvement in politics, seeing it as a way to advocate for the interest of Copts, during the rise of Islamism in Egypt and increase in terrorist attacks. The president of Egypt, Anwar Sadat ordered that Shenouda be put into exile in a Coptic Monastery far away from Cairo in 1981. This exile was short lived, ending when Sadat was assassinated by Muslim extremists a few months later. Under president Hosni Mubarak, Shenouda continued his political stance and often protested persecution of Copts by leaving Cairo and staying in seclusion, which often caused the regime to quickly address issues. Shenouda's political involvement drew criticism from some church members, including the prominent monk Father Matta El Meskeen.

On 17 March 2012, Pope Shenouda died, leaving many Copts mourning and worrying as tensions rose with Muslims. Shenouda constantly met with Muslim leaders in order to create peace, his death resulting in concerns that without his mediation good relations would break down. Many were worried about increased Islamic control of Egypt as the Muslim Brotherhood won 70% of the parliamentary elections. Shenouda's approach to church leadership has, in part, been adopted by the current patriarch. Pope Tawadros II of Alexandria maintains relations with the Egyptian government and other churches. However, while Shenouda was critical of the expanded influence of Protestant teaching and books in Coptic churches, Tawadros has increased ecumenical dialogue with several Protestant churches. In 2013, Tawadros supported the movement demanding the removal of Egyptian Islamist president Mohamed Morsi. However, Tawadros has been a relatively less political figure than his predecessor and has expressed support for the Egyptian government's institutions during crises.

On 10 May 2023, Pope Tawadros visited the Vatican to celebrate Coptic-Catholic Friendship day and the 50 year anniversary of the meeting between Pope Paul VI and Pope Shenouda III. In this same year Pope Francis announced that the 21 Coptic Martyrs killed by ISIS in Libya in 2015 would be added to the Catholic Roman martyrology, and Pope Tawadros gifted relics from each of the 21 martyrs to the Vatican.

In 2024, the Coptic Orthodox and Roman Catholic churches ended dialogue over Fiducia supplicans and blessing same-sex couples; and in 2026, dialogue was restored between the two churches.

== Fasts, feasts, liturgy and canonical hours ==
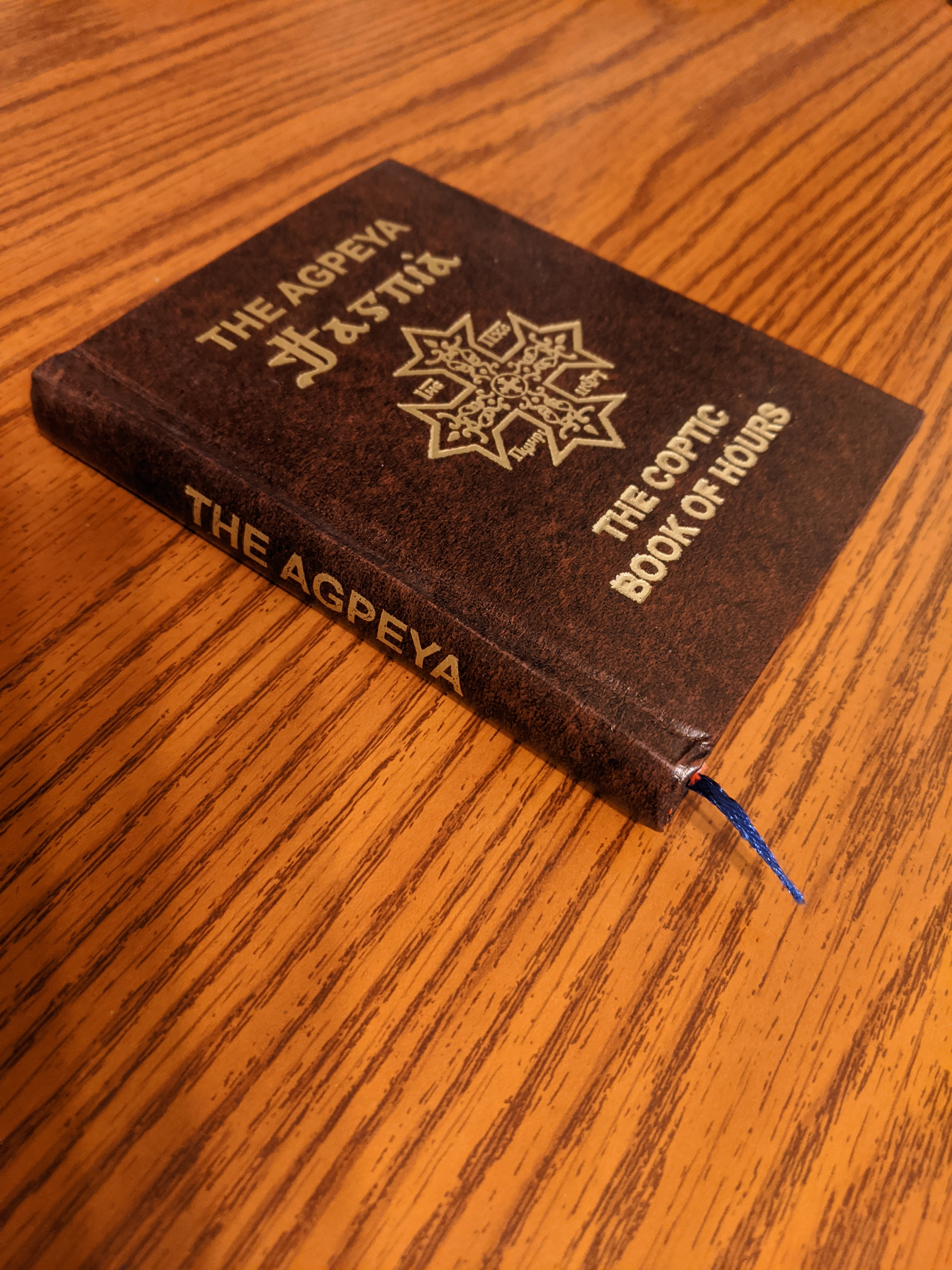
The Agpeya is a breviary used in Coptic Orthodox Christianity to pray the canonical hours at seven fixed prayer times of the day, in the eastward direction.

Communicants of the Coptic Orthodox Church use a breviary known as the Agpeya to pray the canonical hours at seven fixed prayer times while facing in the eastward direction, in anticipation of the Second Coming of Jesus; this Christian practice has its roots in Psalm 119:164, in which the prophet David prays to God seven times a day. Church bells enjoin Christians to pray at these hours. Before praying, they wash their hands and face to be clean before and present their best to God; shoes are removed to acknowledge that one is offering prayer before a holy God. During each of the seven fixed prayer times, Coptic Orthodox Christians pray "prostrating three times in the name of the Trinity; at the end of each Psalm ... while saying the 'Alleluia';" and 41 times for each of the Kyrie eleisons present in a canonical hour. In the Coptic Orthodox Church, it is customary for women to wear a Christian headcovering when praying. The Coptic Orthodox Church observes days of ritual purification. However, while meat that still contains blood after cooking is discouraged from being eaten, the Coptic Church does not forbid its members from consuming any particular type of food, unlike in Islam or Judaism.

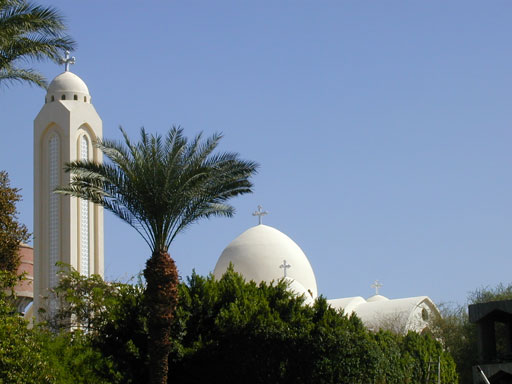
A modern Coptic cathedral in Aswan.

All churches of the Coptic Orthodox Church are designed to face the eastward direction of prayer and efforts are made to remodel churches obtained from other Christian denominations that are not built in this fashion.

In Coptic Orthodox Christianity, fasting is traditionally defined as going without water and food from midnight to sunset; after that time, the consumption of water and one vegetarian meal is permitted. In addition to fasting, Coptic Christians practice abstinence from meat, eggs, and lacticinia (milk, butter, and cheese) when preparing supper. With respect to Eucharistic discipline, Coptic Orthodox Christians fast from midnight onwards (or at least nine hours) prior to receiving the sacrament of Holy Communion. They fast every Wednesday and Friday of the year (Wednesdays in remembrance of the betrayal of Christ, and on Fridays in remembrance of His crucifixion and death). In total, fast days in a year for Coptic Orthodox Christians numbers between 210 and 240. This means that Copts abstain from all animal products for up to two-thirds of each year. The fasts for Advent and Lent are 43 days and 55 days, respectively. In August, before the celebration of the Dormition of the Mother of God, Coptic Christians fast 15 days; fasting is also done before the feast of Feast of Saints Peter and Paul, starting from the day of Pentecost. Married couples refrain from sexual relations during Lent "to give themselves time for fasting and prayer".

Christmas has been a national holiday in Egypt since 2003. It is the only Christian holiday in Egypt. Coptic Christmas, which usually falls on January 6 or 7 is a major feast. Other major feasts are Epiphany, Palm Sunday, Easter, Pentecost, Ascension, and Annunciation. These are known in the Coptic world as the Seven Major Feasts. Major feasts are always preceded by fasts. Additionally, the Coptic Orthodox Church also has Seven Minor Feasts: the Circumcision of the Lord, Entrance into the Temple, Entrance into Egypt, Transfiguration, Maundy Thursday, Thomas Sunday, and Great Lent. Furthermore, there are several indigenous feasts of the Theotokos. There are also other feasts commemorating the martyrdom of important saints from Coptic history.

== Demographics ==
Available Egyptian census figures and other third-party survey reports have not reported more than 4 million Coptic Orthodox Christians in Egypt. However media and other agencies, sometimes taking into account the claims of the church itself, generally approximate the Coptic Orthodox population at 10% of the Egyptian population or 10 million people. Egyptian Copts are the biggest Christian community in the Arab world. Estimates of their numbers vary, but generally range between 4.7 and 7.1 million. The majority of them live in Egypt under the jurisdiction of the Coptic Orthodox Church. Since 2006, Egyptian censuses have not reported on religion and church leaders have alleged that Christians were under-counted in government surveys. The Coptic Church contests the accuracy of government censuses. In 2017, a government owned newspaper Al Ahram estimated the percentage of Copts at 10 to 15% and the membership claimed by the Coptic Orthodox Church is in the range of 20 to 25 million. In 2023, Pope Tawadros II claimed the Coptic Orthodox Church counts 15 million members in Egypt and 2 million in the diaspora. Bishops and Pope Shenouda III had repeatedly claimed that the population of Coptic Orthodox Christians is underreported by the Egyptian government. Church leaders have claimed that, as of 2009, Coptic Orthodox Christians comprised up to 20% of the population. Pew Research has estimated there were four million Egyptian 'Orthodox' Christians in 2016, primarily Coptic Orthodox. The World Christian Database, published in 2021 and produced by the Center for the Study of Global Christianity at the Gordon-Conwell Theological Seminary, estimated that were 8,798,000 Oriental Orthodox Christians in Egypt.

There are also significant numbers in the diaspora outside Africa in countries such as the United States (USA), Canada, Australia, France, and Germany. The exact number of Egyptian born Coptic Orthodox Christians in the diaspora is hard to determine and is roughly estimated to be close to 1 million. Estimates in 2013 put the total number of Egyptians in the USA, Canada, Australia, and Great Britain at 533,000.

There are between 150,000 and 200,000 adherents in Sudan.

== Jurisdiction outside Egypt ==
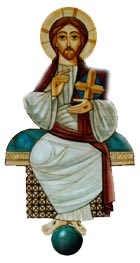
Jesus Christ in a Coptic icon

Besides Egypt, the Church of Alexandria has jurisdiction over all of Africa. The following autocephalous churches have strong historical ties to the Coptic Orthodox Church.

=== Ethiopian Orthodox Tewahedo Church ===
Tradition holds that Ethiopia was first evangelized by St. Matthew and St. Bartholomew in the 1st century AD, and the first Ethiopian convert is thought to have been the eunuch in Jerusalem mentioned in The Acts of the Apostles (8:27–40). Ethiopia was further Christianized in the 4th century AD by two men (likely brothers) from Tyre—St. Frumentius. Ever since the conversion of Ezana of Axum to Christianity by Frumentius in 325 AD, the Ethiopian Orthodox Tewahedo Church has received its archbishops from the Coptic Orthodox Church. Until the mid-twentieth century, the metropolitans of the Ethiopian church were ethnic Copts. Joseph II consecrated Archbishop Abuna Basilios as the first native head of the Ethiopian Church on 14 January 1951. In 1959, Pope Cyril VI of Alexandria crowned Abuna Basilios as the first Patriarch of Ethiopia.

=== Eritrean Orthodox Tewahedo Church ===
Following the independence of Eritrea from Ethiopia in 1993, the newly independent Eritrean government appealed to Pope Shenouda III of Alexandria for Eritrean Orthodox autocephaly. In 1994, Pope Shenouda ordained Abune Phillipos as first Archbishop of Eritrea.

== Pope ==
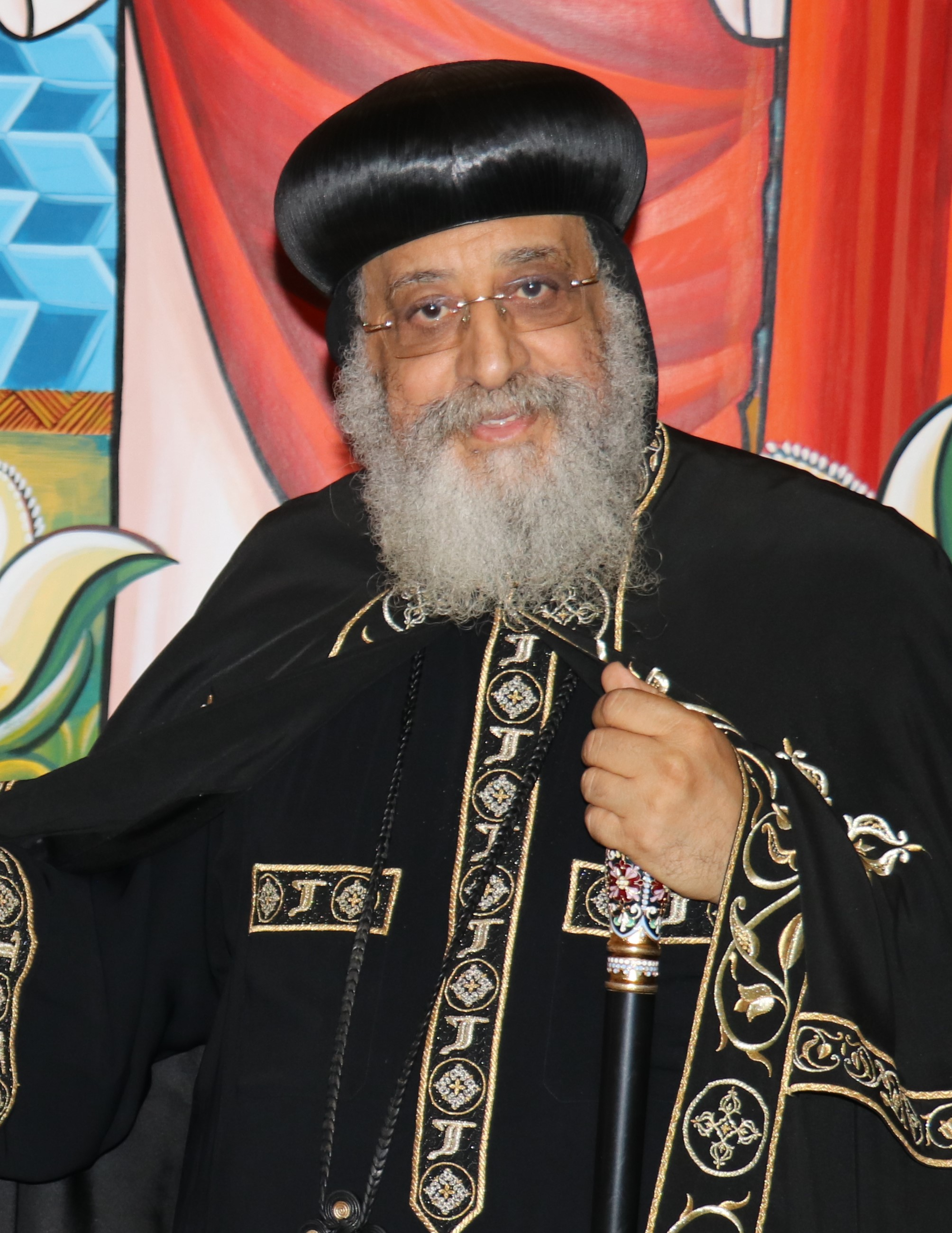
Pope Tawadros II of Alexandria, the 118th Pope of the Coptic Orthodox Church on the Holy Apostolic See of Saint Mark the Evangelist (2012–present).

The pope of the Coptic Orthodox Church functions as a leader for the whole church and is the highest ranking among the church's bishops. The pope is considered the Patriarch of Alexandria and holds that the office descends from Mark the Apostle.

Tawadros II is the current and 118th pope, and has held the office since 2011.

== Administration ==
The Coptic Orthodox Patriarchate of Alexandria is governed by its Holy Synod, which is headed by the Patriarch of Alexandria. Under his authority are the metropolitan archbishops, metropolitan bishops, diocesan bishops, patriarchal exarchs, missionary bishops, auxiliary bishops, suffragan bishops, assistant bishops, chorbishops and the patriarchal vicars for the Church of Alexandria. They are organized as follows:

- 27 metropolitanates, out of which 20 metropolitanates are in Egypt, one metropolitanate in the Near East, two in the USA, one in Africa and 3 in Europe; served by one metropolitan archbishop and 26 metropolitan bishops; out of the 27 hierarchs, one metropolitan archbishop is in the Near East, while 20 metropolitan bishops are in Egypt, two metropolitan bishops in the USA, one metropolitan bishop in Africa and 3 metropolitan bishops in Europe.
- 66 dioceses with 39 diocesan bishops are in Egypt, 14 diocesan bishops are in Europe, 6 diocesan bishops are in North America, two diocesan bishops are in South America, two diocesan bishops are in Sudan, two diocesan bishops in Australia, and one diocesan bishop in Africa.
- one suffragan diocese, with one suffragan bishop in North America.
- 5 auxiliary bishops, two in the Diocese of Los Angeles, two in the Southern USA diocese in North America and one in the diocese of Qena, Egypt.
- 13 assistant bishops in Egypt for 13 suffragan dioceses within an archdiocese under the Patriarch's jurisdiction.
- 8 patriarchal exarchates, with one in Asia & Australia, one in Africa, three in North America and three in Egypt.
- 18 bishop abbots for 17 patriarchal monasteries in Egypt and one patriarchal monastery in Australia.
- four general bishops, administrators of patriarchal institutions in Egypt.
- one hegumen in the capacity of grand Economos, patriarchal vicar for Alexandria.
- one hegumen as administrative patriarchal vicar for Cairo.

== See also ==
- Pope of the Coptic Orthodox Church
- General Congregation Council
- List of Coptic Orthodox churches in Egypt
- Copts
- List of Coptic saints
- Coptic architecture
- Institute of Coptic Studies
- Coptic Orphans
- Oriental Orthodox Churches
  - Orthodox Tewahedo
    - Ethiopian Orthodox Tewahedo Church
    - Eritrean Orthodox Tewahedo Church
- Christian influences on the Islamic world
- Christianity and Islam
- Christianity in Africa
- Christianity in the Middle East
- Arab Christians
- Flight into Egypt
- Zabbaleen
- 2011 Alexandria bombing
- Nag Hammadi massacre
- Persecution of Copts

== Bibliography ==
- Betts, Robert B. (1978). Christians in the Arab East: A Political Study (2nd rev. ed.). Athens: Lycabettus Press. ISBN 978-0-8042-0796-6. Archived from the original on 23 April 2023.
- Brock, Sebastian P. (2016). "Miaphysite, not Monophysite!". Cristianesimo Nella Storia. 37 (1): 45–52. ISBN 978-88-15-26168-7. Archived from the original on 23 April 2023.
- Carroll, Warren (1 March 1987), The Building of Christendom, Front Royal: Christendom College Press, ISBN 978-0-931888-24-3
- Cannuyer, Christian (2001). Coptic Egypt: The Christians of the Nile. "Abrams Discoveries" series. Translated by Hawkes, Sophie. New York: Harry N. Abrams, Inc. ISBN 978-0-8109-2979-1.
- Charles, Robert H. (2007) [1916]. The Chronicle of John, Bishop of Nikiu: Translated from Zotenberg's Ethiopic Text. Merchantville, NJ: Evolution Publishing. ISBN 978-1-889758-87-9. Archived from the original on 23 April 2023.
- Grillmeier, Aloys (1975) [1965]. Christ in Christian Tradition: From the Apostolic Age to Chalcedon (451). Vol. 1 (2nd revised ed.). Atlanta: John Knox Press. ISBN 978-0-664-22301-4. Archived from the original on 23 April 2023.
- Grillmeier, Aloys; Hainthaler, Theresia (1996). Christ in Christian Tradition: The Church of Alexandria with Nubia and Ethiopia after 451. Vol. 2/4. Louisville: Westminster John Knox Press. ISBN 978-0-664-22300-7. Archived from the original on 23 April 2023.
- Meinardus, Otto (1 October 2002). Two Thousand Years of Coptic Christianity. Cairo: American University in Cairo Press. ISBN 978-977-424-757-6. Archived from the original on 20 May 2008.
- Meyendorff, John (1989). Imperial unity and Christian divisions: The Church 450–680 A.D. The Church in history. Vol. 2. Crestwood, NY: St. Vladimir's Seminary Press. ISBN 978-0-88141-055-6. Archived from the original on 12 January 2023.
- Morgan, Robert (2016). History of the Coptic Orthodox People and the Church of Egypt. FriesnPress. ISBN 978-1-4602-8027-0.
- Ostrogorsky, George (1956). History of the Byzantine State. Oxford: Basil Blackwell. Archived from the original on 23 April 2023.
- Partrick, Theodore (June 1996). Traditional Egyptian Christianity: A History of the Coptic Orthodox Church. Greensboro, NC: Fisher Park Press. ISBN 978-0-9652396-0-8.
- Butcher, E. L. (2008) [1897]. Story of the Church of Egypt (in Arabic) (text file ed.). London: Smith, Elder & Co. ISBN 978-0-8370-7610-2. Archived from the original on 26 January 2021.
- Iskandar, Adel; Hakem Rustom (January 2006). "From Paris to Cairo: Resistance of the Unacculturated". The Ambassadors Online Magazine. Archived from the original on 9 December 2010.
- Wolfgang Kosack (2014). Novum Testamentum Coptice. Neues Testament, Bohairisch, ediert von Wolfgang Kosack. Novum Testamentum, Bohairice, curavit Wolfgang Kosack. Neue Ausgabe, Christoph Brunner, Basel. ISBN 978-3-906206-04-2.
- Winkler, Dietmar W. (1997). "Miaphysitism: A New Term for Use in the History of Dogma and in Ecumenical Theology". The Harp. 10 (3): 33–40. Archived from the original on 22 December 2021.
