= Church of the Holy Sepulchre =

Church in Jerusalem

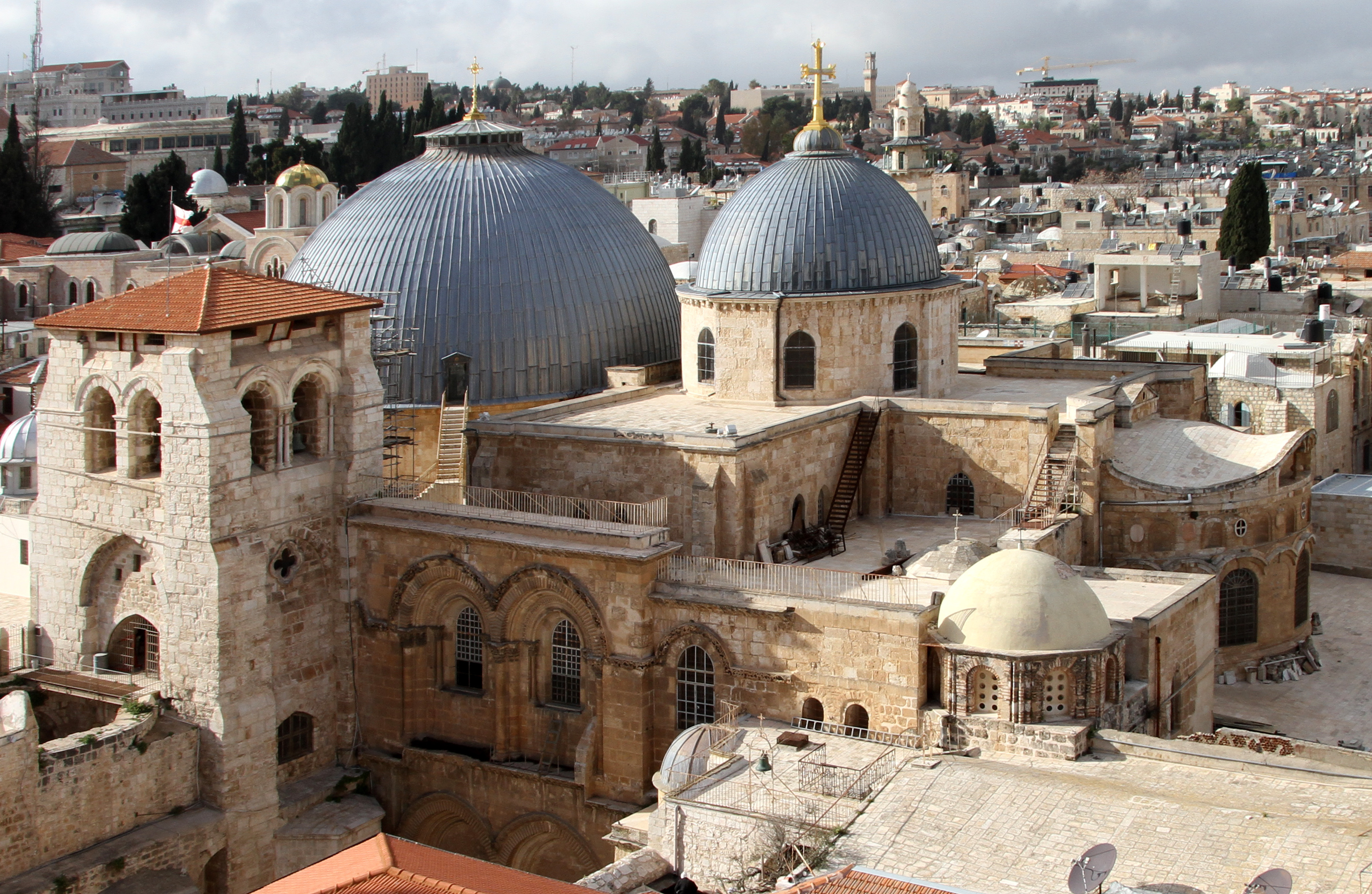
- The church in 2010, from left to right: the bell tower (12th century), rotunda (big dome), catholicon (smaller dome), and ambulatory
- Church of the Holy Sepulchre
- 31°46′42″N 35°13′47″E
- Location: Christian Quarter, Old City of Jerusalem
- Denomination: Catholic Church, Greek Orthodox Church, Armenian Apostolic Church and minor rights to Syriac Orthodox Church, Coptic Orthodox Church, Ethiopian Orthodox Church
- Website: Catholic Eastern Orthodox

History
- Status: Active
- Founder: Helena, mother of Constantine I
- Consecrated: 13 September 335 (1691 years ago)

Architecture
- Architect: Nikolaos Ch. Komnenos (1810 restoration)
- Style: Paleochristian, Romanesque
- Groundbreaking: c. AD 326
- Completed: AD 335 (demolished in 1009, rebuilt in 1048)

Specifications
- Capacity: 8,000
- Materials: Stone

The Church of the Holy Sepulchre, (Note: Arabic: كنيسة القبر المقدس, romanized: Kanīsat al-Qabr al-Muqaddas; Greek: Ναός τοῦ Παναγίου Τάφου, romanized: Naós toû Panagíou Táphou; Latin: Ecclesia Sancti Sepulchri; Amharic: የቅዱስ መቃብር ቤተ፡ክርስቲያን, romanized: Yäḳdus Mäḳabr betä-krəstiyan.) (Note: see spelling differences "sepulcher". Collins English Dictionary. HarperCollins. OCLC 1120411289.) also known as the Church of the Resurrection, (Note: Arabic: كنيسة القيامة, romanized: Kanīsat al-Qiyāmah; Greek: Ναός τῆς Ἀναστάσεως, romanized: Naós tês Anastáseōs; Armenian: Սուրբ Հարության տաճար, romanized: Surb Harutʻyan tačar, classical orthography: Սուրբ Յարութեան տաճար.) is a fourth-century church in the Christian Quarter of the Old City of Jerusalem. The church is simultaneously the seat of the Armenian Patriarchate of Jerusalem, the Greek Orthodox Patriarchate of Jerusalem, and the Catholic Latin Patriarchate of Jerusalem. It is the holiest site in Christianity, and it has been an important pilgrimage site for Christians since the fourth century.

According to traditional beliefs dating to the fourth century, the church contains the site of the crucifixion of Jesus at Calvary, or Golgotha, and the location of Jesus's empty tomb where he was buried and resurrected. Both locations are considered immensely holy sites by most Christians. Researchers note that there are two or three independent accounts of the burial of Jesus in a tomb, and many scholars view the site as the possible location. Archeological findings in the site are consistent with details found in early sources, including the Gospel of John. After the crucifixion, Emperor Hadrian covered the tomb of Jesus and erected a Temple of Aphrodite on top of it (c. 135 AD), where it remained until Constantine the Great rediscovered the tomb around 325 AD. The church and rotunda were built under Constantine's rule in the 4th century (which has been confirmed by scientific testing), and destroyed in 1009 by al-Hakim. Al-Hakim's son allowed Emperor Constantine IX Monomachos to reconstruct the church, which was completed in 1048. After it was captured by the crusaders in 1099, it continued to undergo modifications, resulting in a significant departure from the original structure. Several renovations and restorations were made under the Ottomans. The tomb itself is enclosed by a 19th-century shrine called the Aedicule.

Within the church proper are the last four stations of the Cross of the Via Dolorosa, representing the final episodes of the Passion of Jesus. Since its creation the church has been a major Christian pilgrimage destination as the traditional site of the resurrection of Christ; hence its original Greek name, Church of the Anastasis (Resurrection).

The Status Quo, an understanding between religious communities dating to 1757, applies to the site. Control of the church itself is shared among several Christian denominations and secular entities in complicated arrangements essentially unchanged for over 160 years, and some for much longer. The main denominations sharing property over parts of the church are the Roman Catholic, Greek Orthodox, Armenian Apostolic, Coptic, Syriac, and Ethiopian Orthodox. Directly adjacent to the Church of the Holy Sepulchre is the Church of the Redeemer, marking a Lutheran presence at the site.

== Name ==
The Church of the Holy Sepulchre (Note: see spelling differences "sepulcher". Collins English Dictionary. HarperCollins. OCLC 1120411289.) is also known as the Basilica of the Holy Sepulchre or simply as the Holy Sepulchre, named for the tomb of Jesus, the focal point of his resurrection according to Christians. Eastern Christians also directly call it the Church of the Resurrection or the Church of the Anastasis – anástasis (ἀνάστασις) being Greek for resurrection.

== History ==
=== Background (1st–4th centuries) ===
After the siege of Jerusalem in AD 70 during the First Jewish–Roman War, Jerusalem had been reduced to ruins. In AD 130, the Roman emperor Hadrian began the building of a Roman colony, the new city of Aelia Capitolina, on the site. About AD 135, he ordered that a cave containing a rock-cut tomb (Note: Some Christian scholars have argued that this may have already been a site of veneration for the tomb of Jesus. Joan E. Taylor posits that the tomb's location could have been preserved by the local collective memory of Jesus's followers.) be filled in to make a flat foundation for a temple dedicated to Venus or Aphrodite. The temple remained until the early fourth century.

After the death of Jesus, Emperor Hadrian covered the tomb and erected a Temple of Aphrodite on top of it around 135 AD and it remained until Constantine rediscovered the tomb around 325 AD. Physical testing of a mortar layer between the original older limestone tomb and later marble slab, revealed that the original shrine construction around the actual tomb could be securely dated to the time of Constantine, as historical records indicate on its rediscovery.

=== Constantine and Macarius: context for the first sanctuary ===
After seeing a vision of a cross in the sky in 312, Constantine the Great began to favour Christianity and signed the Edict of Milan legalizing the religion. The Bishop of Jerusalem Macarius asked Constantine for permission to dig for the tomb. With the help of Eusebius (a Bishop of Caesarea) and Macarius, three crosses were found near a tomb; one, which was said to have cured people near death, was presumed to be the True Cross, on which Jesus was crucified, leading the Romans to believe that they had found Calvary.

About 326, Constantine ordered that the temple to Jupiter or Venus be replaced by a church. After the temple was torn down and its ruins removed, the soil was removed from the cave, revealing a rock-cut tomb that Macarius identified as the burial site of Jesus.

=== First sanctuary and Sassanid destruction (4th–7th centuries) ===
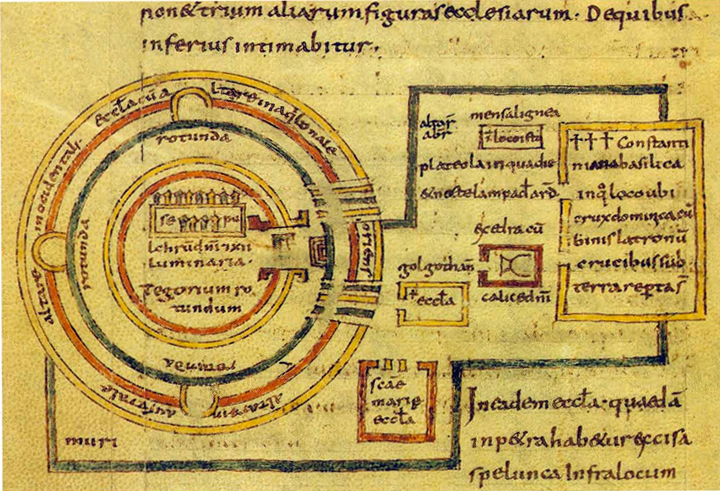
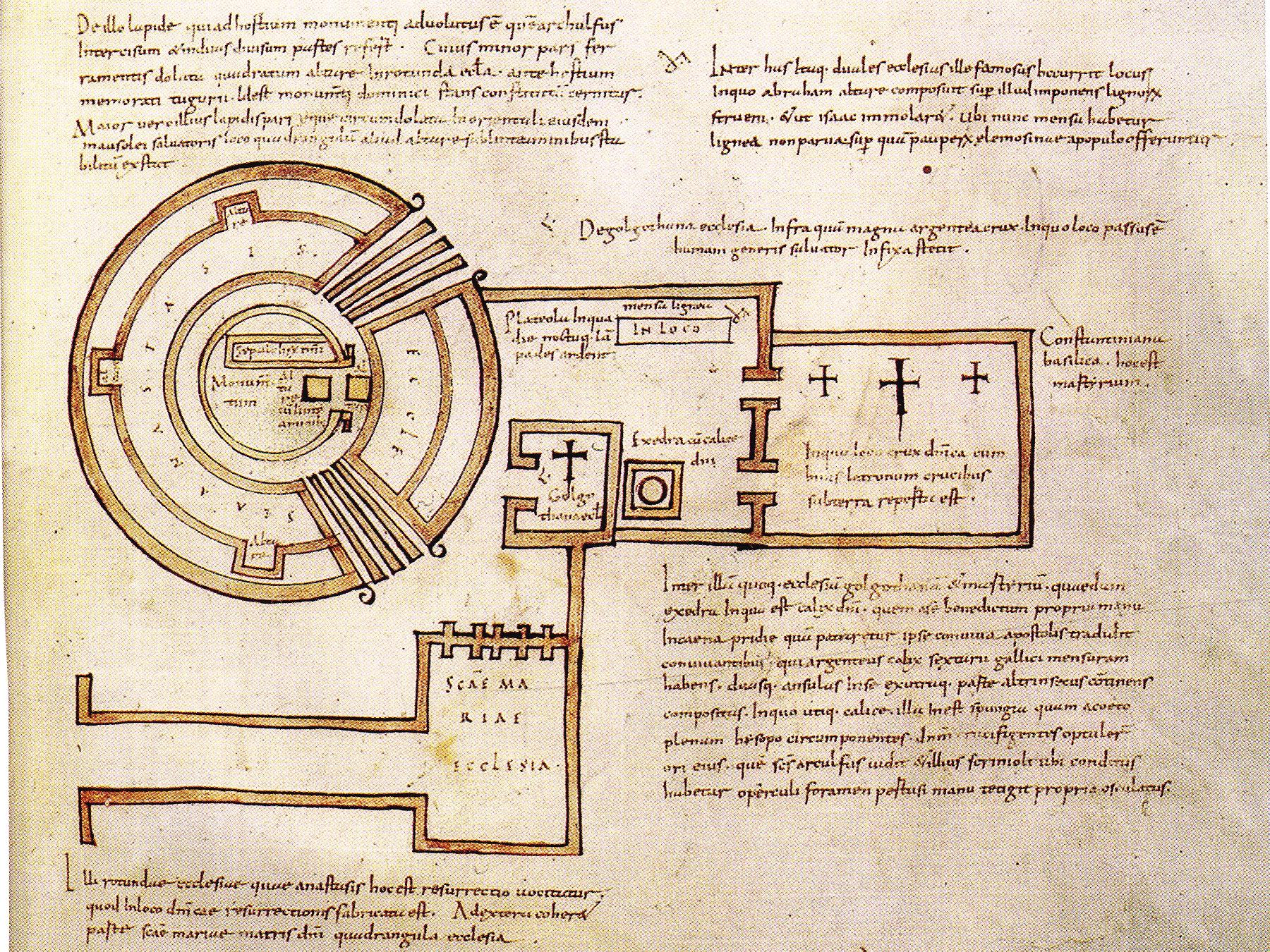
Two manuscript versions of the oldest known floor plans of the church, from De Locis Sanctis (c. AD 680)

A shrine was built on the site of the tomb Macarius had identified as that of Jesus, enclosing the rock tomb walls within its own. (Note: This shrine would have to be replaced over the subsequent centuries, most recently in the 19th century.)

The Church of the Holy Sepulchre, planned by the architect Zenobius, was built as separate constructs over two holy sites:

1. a rotunda called the Anastasis ('Resurrection'), where Macarius believed Jesus to have been buried, and;
2. the great basilica (also known as Martyrium), across a courtyard to the east (an enclosed colonnaded atrium, known as the Triportico) with the traditional site of Calvary in one corner.

Diagram of a possible church layout (facing west) published in 1956 by Kenneth John Conant

The Church of the Holy Sepulchre site has been recognized since early in the fourth century as the place where Jesus was crucified, buried, and rose from the dead. (Note: The Church of the Holy Sepulchre is known among the Eastern Orthodox believers as the Church of the Resurrection.) The church was consecrated on 13 September 335. (Note: Every year, the Eastern Orthodox Church celebrates the anniversary of the Dedication of the Temple of the Resurrection of Christ.)

In 327, Constantine and Helena separately commissioned the Church of the Nativity in Bethlehem to commemorate the birth of Jesus.

The Constantinian sanctuary in Jerusalem was destroyed by a fire in May of 614, when the Sassanid Empire, under Khosrow II, invaded Jerusalem and captured the True Cross. In 630, the Emperor Heraclius rebuilt the church after recapturing the city.

=== Early Islamic period (7th–10th centuries) ===
After Jerusalem came under Islamic rule, it remained a Christian church, with the early Muslim rulers protecting the city's Christian sites, prohibiting their destruction or use as living quarters. A story reports that the caliph Umar ibn al-Khattab visited the church and stopped to pray on the balcony, but at the time of prayer, turned away from the church and prayed outside. He feared that future generations would misinterpret this gesture, taking it as a pretext to turn the church into a mosque. Eutychius of Alexandria adds that Umar wrote a decree saying that Muslims would not inhabit this location. The building suffered severe damage from an earthquake in 746.

Early in the ninth century, another earthquake damaged the dome of the Anastasis. The damage was repaired in 810 by Patriarch Thomas I. In 841, the church suffered a fire. In 935, the Christians prevented the construction of a Muslim mosque adjacent to the Church. In 938, a new fire damaged the inside of the basilica and came close to the rotunda. In 966, due to a defeat of Muslim armies in the region of Syria, a riot broke out, which was followed by reprisals. The basilica was burned again. The doors and roof were burnt, and Patriarch John VII was murdered.

=== Fatimid destruction and reconstruction (11th century) ===
On 18 October 1009, Fatimid caliph al-Hakim bi-Amr Allah ordered the complete destruction of the church as part of a more general campaign against Christian and Jewish places of worship in Palestine and Egypt, (Note: Adémar de Chabannes recorded that the church of Saint George at Lydda "with many other churches of the saints" had been attacked, and the "basilica of the Lord's Sepulchre destroyed down to the ground". The Christian writer Yahya ibn Sa'id reported that everything was razed "except those parts which were impossible to destroy or would have been too difficult to carry away". Morris 2005) He was also hostile toward Sunni Muslims. The damage was extensive, with few parts of the early church remaining, and the roof of the rock-cut tomb damaged; the original shrine was destroyed. The tomb itself was almost completely destroyed, with only portions of the northern wall containing the burial bench and the southern wall surviving. Some partial repairs followed. Christian Europe reacted with shock: it was a spur to expulsions of Jews and, later on, used as a justification for the Crusades.

In wide-ranging negotiations between the Fatimids and the Byzantine Empire in 1027–1028, an agreement was reached whereby the new Caliph Ali az-Zahir (al-Hakim's son) agreed to allow the rebuilding and redecoration of the church. The rebuilding was finally completed during the tenures of Emperor Constantine IX Monomachos and Patriarch Nicephorus of Jerusalem in 1048, during the reign of al-Mustansir Billah (Ali az-Zahir's son). As a concession, the mosque in Constantinople was reopened and the khutba sermons were to be pronounced in az-Zahir's name. Muslim sources say a by-product of the agreement was the renunciation of Islam by many Christians who had been forced to convert under al-Hakim's persecutions. In addition, the Byzantines, while releasing 5,000 Muslim prisoners, made demands for the restoration of other churches destroyed by al-Hakim and the reestablishment of a patriarch in Jerusalem. Contemporary sources credit the emperor with spending vast sums in an effort to restore the Church of the Holy Sepulchre after this agreement was made. Still, "a total replacement was far beyond available resources. The new construction was concentrated on the rotunda and its surrounding buildings: the great basilica remained in ruins."

The rebuilt church site consisted of "a court open to the sky, with five small chapels attached to it." The chapels were east of the court of resurrection (when reconstructed, the location of the tomb was under open sky), where the western wall of the great basilica had been. They commemorated scenes from the passion, such as the location of the prison of Christ and his flagellation, and presumably were so placed because of the difficulties of free movement among shrines in the city streets. The dedication of these chapels indicates the importance of the pilgrims' devotion to the suffering of Christ. They have been described as "a sort of Via Dolorosa in miniature" since little or no rebuilding took place on the site of the great basilica. Western pilgrims to Jerusalem during the 11th century found much of the sacred site in ruins. Control of Jerusalem, and thereby the Church of the Holy Sepulchre, continued to change hands several times between the Fatimids and the Seljuk Turks (loyal to the Abbasid caliph in Baghdad) until the Crusaders' arrival in 1099.

=== Crusader period (1099–1187) ===
==== Background ====
Many historians maintain that the main concern of Pope Urban II, when calling for the First Crusade, was the threat to Constantinople from the Seljuk invasion of Asia Minor in response to the appeal of Byzantine Emperor Alexios I Komnenos. Historians agree that the fate of Jerusalem and thereby the Church of the Holy Sepulchre was also of concern, if not the immediate goal of papal policy in 1095. The idea of taking Jerusalem gained more focus as the Crusade was underway. The rebuilt church site was taken from the Fatimids (who had recently taken it from the Abbasids) by the knights of the First Crusade on 15 July 1099.

The First Crusade was envisioned as an armed pilgrimage, and no crusader could consider his journey complete unless he had prayed as a pilgrim at the Holy Sepulchre. In light of this mentality, Crusader leader Godfrey of Bouillon (who became the first Latin ruler of Jerusalem) decided not to use the title "king" during his lifetime, and declared himself Advocatus Sancti Sepulchri ('Protector [or Defender] of the Holy Sepulchre').

According to the German priest and pilgrim Ludolf von Sudheim, the keys to the Chapel of the Holy Sepulchre were in hands of the "ancient Georgians", and the food, alms, candles and oil for lamps were given to them by the pilgrims at the south door of the church.

==== Crusaders: reconstruction (12th century) and ownership ====
By the Crusader period, a cistern under the former basilica was rumoured to have been where Helena had found the True Cross, and began to be venerated as such; the cistern later became the Chapel of the Invention of the Cross, but there is no evidence of the site's identification before the 11th century, and modern archaeological investigation has now dated the cistern to 11th-century repairs by Monomachos.

William of Tyre, chronicler of the Crusader Kingdom of Jerusalem, reports on the rebuilding of the church in the mid-12th century. The Crusaders investigated the eastern ruins on the site, occasionally excavating through the rubble, and while attempting to reach the cistern, they discovered part of the original ground level of Hadrian's temple enclosure; they transformed this space into a chapel dedicated to Helena, widening their original excavation tunnel into a proper staircase.

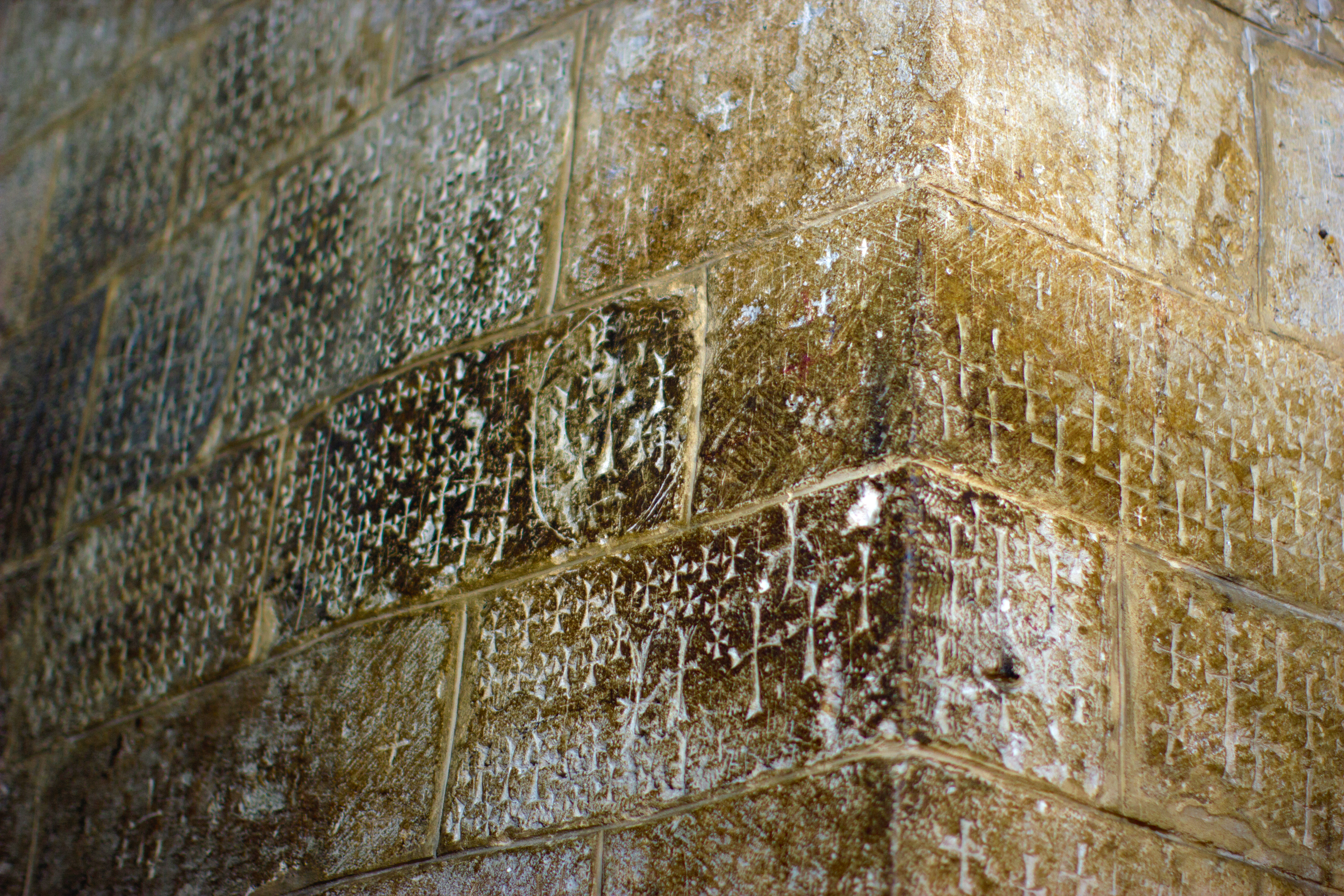
Crusader graffiti in the church: crosses engraved in the staircase leading down to the Chapel of Saint Helena

The Crusaders began to refurnish the church in Romanesque style and added a bell tower. These renovations unified the small chapels on the site and were completed during the reign of Queen Melisende in 1149, placing all the holy places under one roof for the first time.

The church became the seat of the first Latin patriarchs and the site of the kingdom's scriptorium.

Eight 11th- and 12th-century Crusader leaders (Godfrey, Baldwin I, Baldwin II, Fulk, Baldwin III, Amalric, Baldwin IV and Baldwin V – the first eight rulers of the Kingdom of Jerusalem) were buried in the south transept and inside the Chapel of Adam. The royal tombs were looted during the Khwarizmian sack of Jerusalem in 1244 but probably remained mostly intact until 1808 when a fire damaged the church. The tombs may have been destroyed by the fire, or during renovations by the Greek Orthodox custodians of the church in 1809–1810. The remains of the kings may still be in unmarked pits under the church's pavement.

=== Ayyubid, Mamluk and Ottoman periods ===
The church was lost to Saladin, along with the rest of the city, in 1187, although the treaty established after the Third Crusade allowed Christian pilgrims to visit the site. Emperor Frederick II (r. 1220–50) regained the city and the church by treaty in the 13th century while under a ban of excommunication, with the consequence that the holiest church in Christianity was laid under interdict. The church seems to have been largely in the hands of Greek Orthodox patriarch Athanasius II of Jerusalem (c. 1231–47) during the last period of Latin control over Jerusalem. Both city and church were captured by the Khwarezmians and the Ayyubids in 1244.

There was certainly a recognisable ‘Nestorian’ (Church of the East) presence at the Holy Sepulchre from the years 1348 through 1575, as contemporary Franciscan accounts indicate. The Franciscan friars renovated the church in 1555, as it had been neglected despite increased numbers of pilgrims. The Franciscans rebuilt the Aedicule, extending the structure to create an antechamber. A marble shrine commissioned by Friar Boniface of Ragusa was placed to envelop the remains of Christ's tomb, probably to prevent pilgrims from touching the original rock or taking small pieces as souvenirs. A marble slab was placed over the limestone burial bed where Jesus's body is believed to have lain.

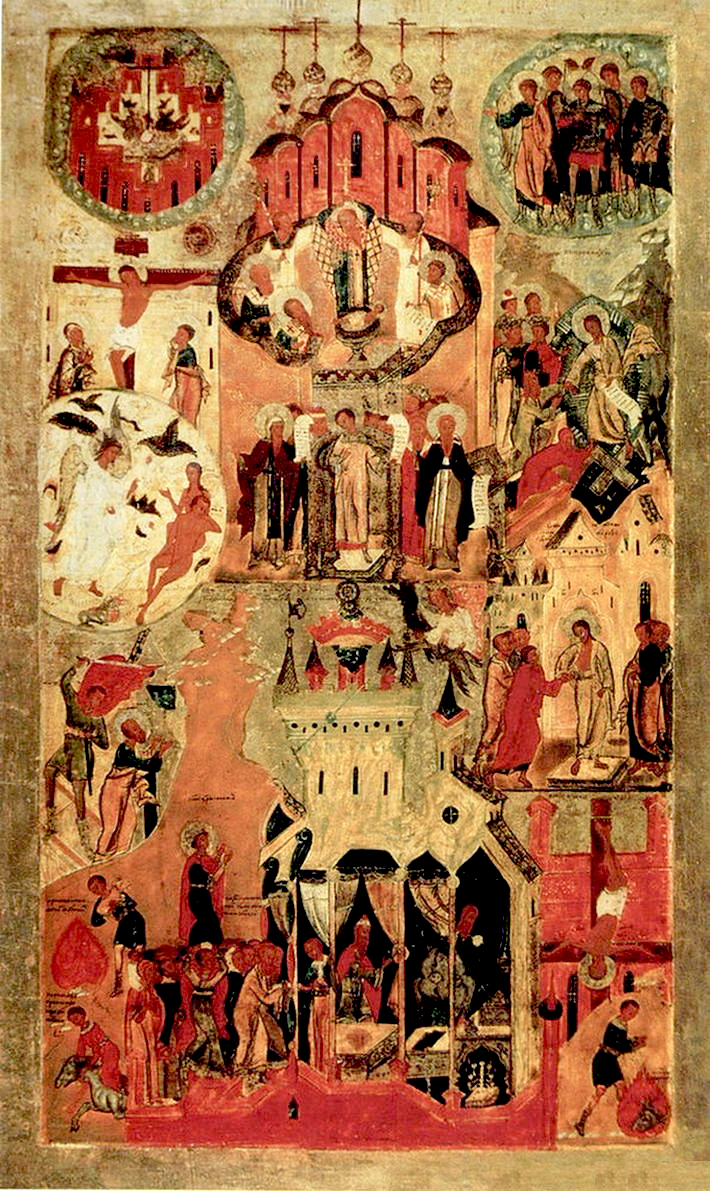
Eastern Orthodox icon (c. 1600) commemorating a church renovation

After the renovation of 1555, control of the church oscillated between the Franciscans and the Orthodox, depending on which community could obtain a favourable firman from the "Sublime Porte" at a particular time, often through outright bribery. Violent clashes were not uncommon. There was no agreement about this question, although it was discussed at the negotiations to the Treaty of Karlowitz in 1699.

In the mid-17th century, Evliya Çelebi, the renowned Ottoman traveler and a devout Muslim, visited the church and wrote that despite its "beautiful adornment", he found it lacking in "spirituality", comparing it instead to something like a "tourist attraction". After touring the building, he wrote that he performed "two prostrations in a corner" and expressed the hope that "it one day become a Muslim place of worship". He also objected to what he saw of religious practice there, complaining about the many statues at the church, and about what he described as priests deceiving believers.

During the Holy Week of 1757, Orthodox Christians reportedly took over some of the Franciscan-controlled church. This may have been the cause of the sultan's firman (decree) later developed into the Status Quo. (Note: The need for total agreement for even minor changes is exemplified in the 'immovable ladder' under one of the church's windows; it has remained in the same position since at least 1757, aside from two occasions of temporary removal.)

A fire severely damaged the structure again in 1808, causing the dome of the rotunda to collapse and smashing the Aedicule's exterior decoration. The rotunda and the Aedicule's exterior were rebuilt in 1809–10 by architect Nikolaos Ch. Komnenos of Mytilene in the contemporary Ottoman Baroque style. The interior of the antechamber, now known as the Chapel of the Angel, (Note: One of the two chapels within the shrine, a pilaster incorporates a piece of the stone said to have been rolled away from the tomb; it functions as a Greek Orthodox altar.) was partly rebuilt to a square ground plan in place of the previously semicircular western end.

Another decree in 1853 from the sultan solidified the existing territorial division among the communities and solidified the Status Quo for arrangements to "remain in their present state", requiring consensus to make even minor changes.

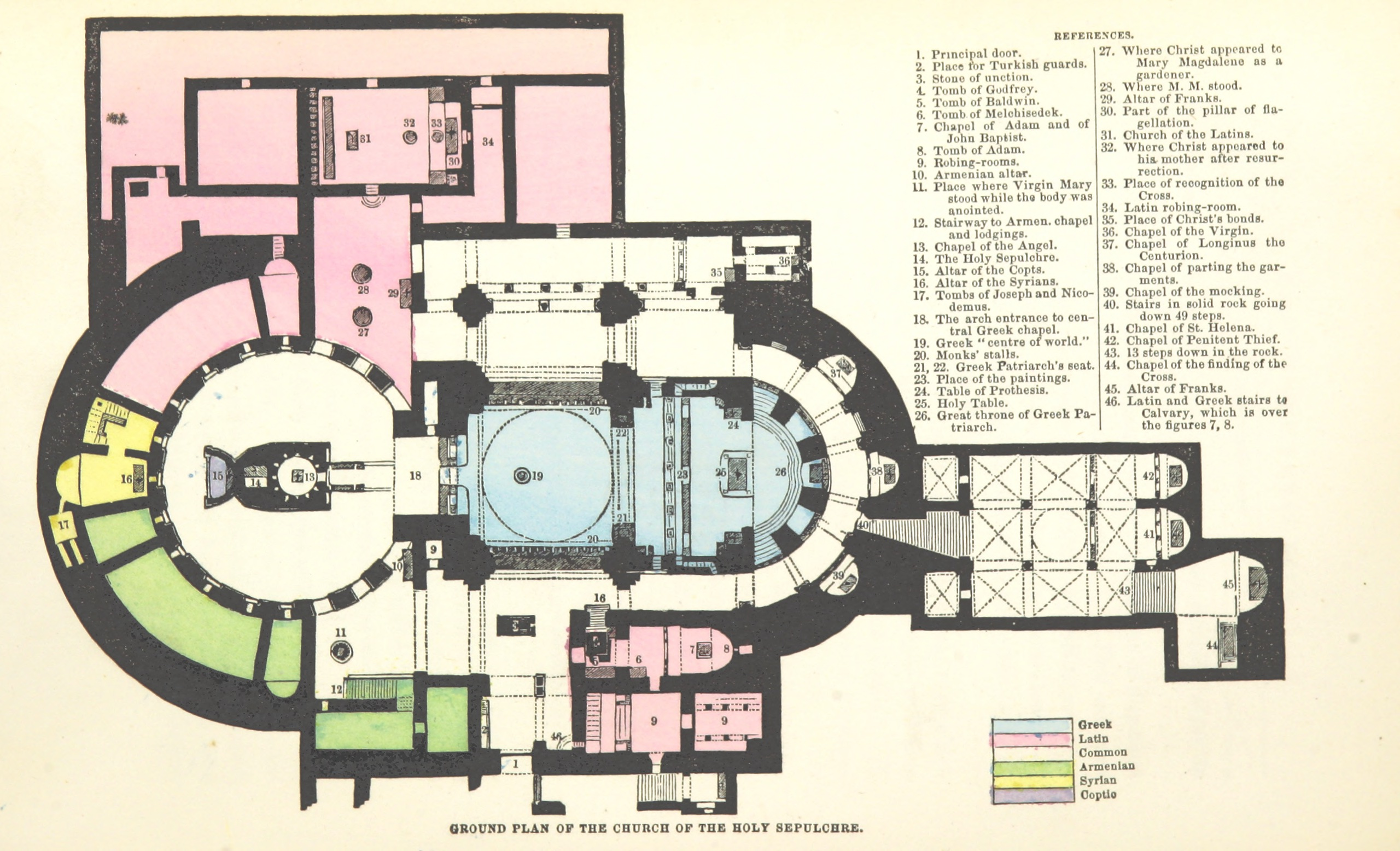
Floorplan in 1857

The dome was restored by Catholics, Greeks, and Turks in 1868, being made of iron ever since.

=== British Mandate period ===
By the time of the British Mandate for Palestine following the end of World War I, the cladding of red limestone applied to the Aedicule by Komnenos had deteriorated badly and was detaching from the underlying structure; from 1947 until restoration work in 2016–17, it was held in place with an exterior scaffolding of iron girders installed by the British authorities.

=== Jordanian and Israeli period ===
Diagram of the modern church showing the traditional site of Calvary and the Tomb of Jesus

In 1948, Jerusalem was divided between Israel and Jordan and where the church was located, in the Old City, were made part of Jordan. In 1967, Israeli forces captured East Jerusalem in the Six Day War, and that area has remained under Israeli control ever since. Under Israeli rule, legal arrangements relating to the churches of East Jerusalem were maintained in coordination with the Jordanian government. The dome at the Church of the Holy Sepulchre was restored again in 1994–97 as part of extensive modern renovations that have been ongoing since 1959. During the 1970–78 restoration works and excavations inside the building, and under the nearby Muristan bazaar, it was found that the area was originally a quarry, from which white meleke limestone was struck. Blocks of Meleke limestone were extracted from the quarry and their traces can be seen on the surfaces of floors, walls and the ceiling in the Chapel of St. Vartan

==== Chapel of St. Vartan ====
East of the Chapel of Saint Helena, the excavators discovered a void containing a fourth-century drawing of a Roman pilgrim ship, two low walls supporting the platform of Hadrian's second-century temple, and a higher fourth-century wall built to support Constantine's basilica. After the excavations of the early 1970s, the Armenian authorities converted this archaeological space into the Chapel of Saint Vartan, and created an artificial walkway over the quarry on the north of the chapel, so that the new chapel could be accessed (by permission) from the Chapel of Saint Helena.

==== Aedicule restoration ====
After seven decades of being held together by steel girders, the Israel Antiquities Authority (IAA) declared the visibly deteriorating Aedicule structure unsafe. A restoration of the Aedicule was agreed upon and executed from May 2016 to March 2017. Much of the $4 million project was funded by the World Monuments Fund, as well as $1.3 million from Mica Ertegün and a significant sum from King Abdullah II of Jordan. The existence of the original limestone cave walls within the Aedicule was confirmed, and a window was created to view this from the inside. The presence of moisture led to the discovery of an underground shaft resembling an escape tunnel carved into the bedrock, seeming to lead from the tomb. (Note: According to archaeologist Fredrik Hiebert, this does not resemble an archaeological excavation, but "a well-built tunnel".) For the first time since at least 1555, on 26 October 2016, marble cladding that protects the supposed burial bed of Jesus was removed. Members of the National Technical University of Athens were present. Initially, only a layer of debris was visible. This was cleared in the next day, and a partially broken marble slab with a Crusader-style cross carved was revealed. By the night of 28 October, the original limestone burial bed was shown to be intact. The tomb was resealed shortly thereafter. Mortar from just above the burial bed was later dated to the mid-fourth century.

==== 2020 pandemic ====
On 25 March 2020, Israeli health officials ordered the site closed to the public due to the COVID-19 pandemic. According to the Joudeh al-Goudia family who are hereditary keepers of the keys, it was the first such closure since 1349, during the Black Death. Clerics continued regular prayers inside the building, and it reopened to visitors two months later, on 24 May.

==== Crusader altar slab discovered (2022) ====
During church renovations in 2022, a stone slab covered in modern graffiti was moved from a wall, revealing Cosmatesque-style decoration on one face. According to an IAA archaeologist, the decoration was once inlaid with pieces of glass and fine marble; it indicates the object was the frontal of the church's high altar from the Crusader era (c. 1149), which was later used by the Greek Orthodox until being damaged in the 1808 fire.

== Description ==
=== Parvis (courtyard) ===
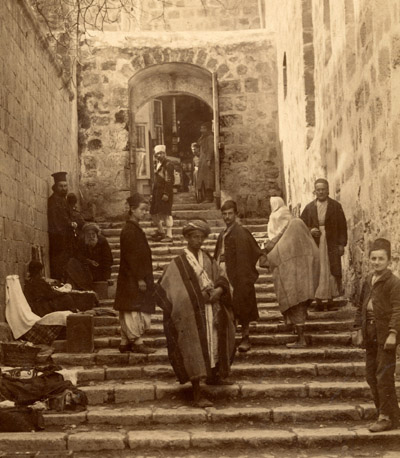
Tourists, pilgrims and locals at one of two access gates to the courtyard; photo by Félix Bonfils, 1870s

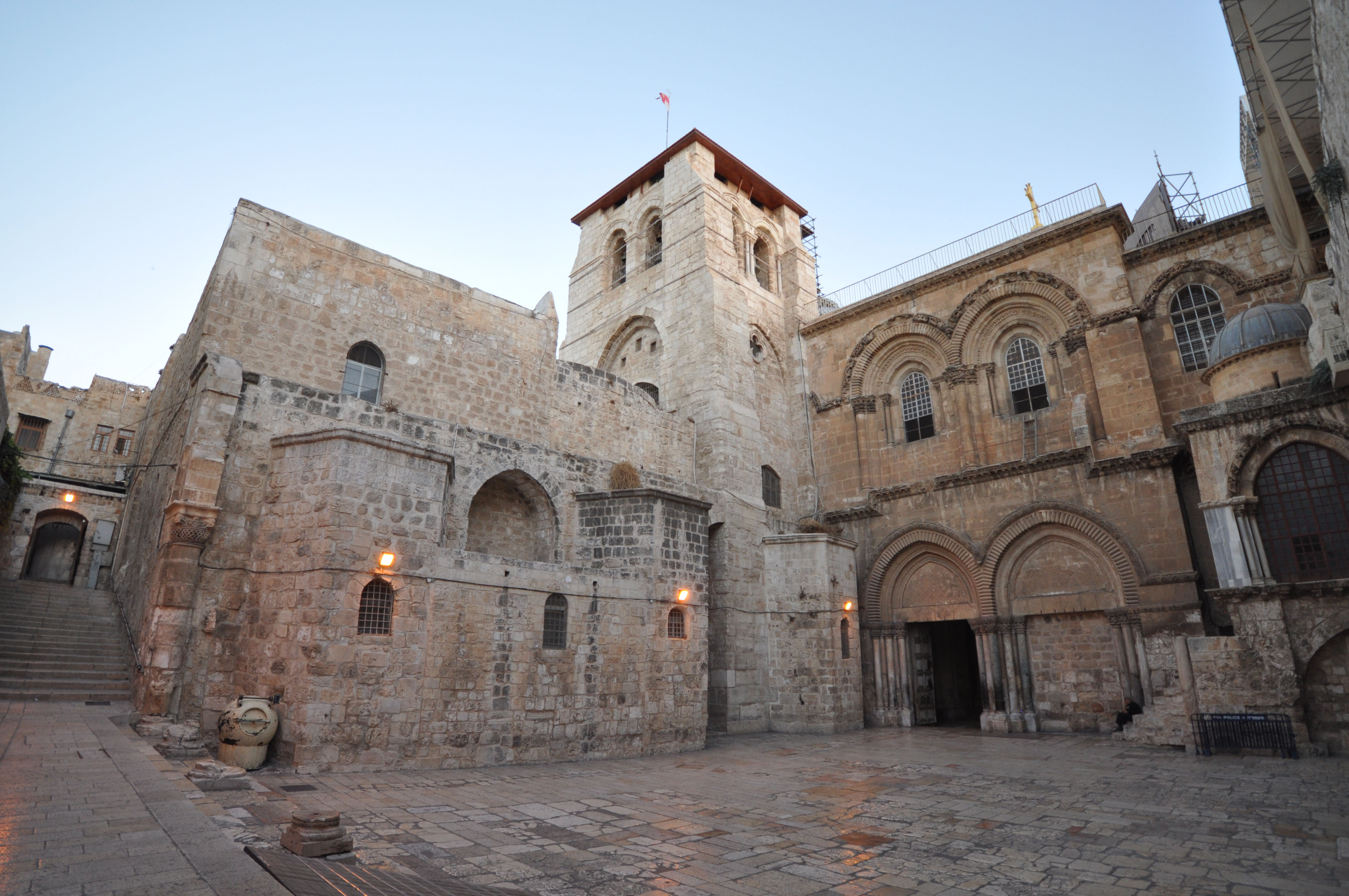
The northeast of the courtyard (parvis), with the immovable ladder under a window, and the Chapel of the Franks (right)

The courtyard facing the entrance to the church is known as the parvis. Two streets open into the parvis: St Helena Road (west) and Suq ed-Dabbagha (east). Around the parvis are a few smaller structures.

South of the parvis, opposite the church, broken columns—once forming part of an arcade—stand opposite the church, at the top of a short descending staircase stretching over the entire breadth of the parvis. In the 13th century, the tops of the columns were removed and sent to Mecca by the Khwarezmids.

- The Gethsemane Metochion, a small Greek Orthodox monastery (metochion).

On the eastern side of the parvis, south to north:

- The Monastery of St Abraham (Greek Orthodox), next to the Suq ed-Dabbagha entrance to the parvis.
- The Chapel of St John the Evangelist (Armenian Orthodox)
- The Chapel of St Michael and the Chapel of the Four Living Creatures (both disputed between the Copts and Ethiopians), giving access to Deir es-Sultan (also disputed), a rooftop monastery surrounding the dome of the Chapel of St Helena.

North of the parvis, in front of the church façade or against it:

- Chapel of the Franks (Chapel of Our Lady of Sorrows): a blue-domed Roman Catholic Crusader chapel dedicated to Our Lady of Sorrows, which once provided exclusive access to Calvary. The chapel marks the 10th Station of the Cross (the Stripping of Jesus's Garments).
- Oratory of St. Mary of Egypt: a Greek Orthodox oratory and chapel, directly beneath the Chapel of the Franks, dedicated to the ascetic St. Mary of Egypt.
- The tomb (including a ledgerstone) of Philip d'Aubigny (died 1236), a knight, tutor, and royal councillor to Henry III of England and signer of Magna Carta—is placed in front of, and between, the church's two original entrance doors, of which the eastern one is walled up. It is one of the few tombs of crusaders and other Europeans not removed from the Church after the Khwarizmian capture of Jerusalem in 1244. In the 1900s, during a fight between the Greeks and Latins, some monks damaged the tomb by throwing stones from the roof. A stone marker was placed on his tomb in 1925, sheltered by a wooden trapdoor that hides it from view.

A group of three chapels borders the parvis on its west side. They originally formed the baptistery complex of the Constantinian church. The southernmost chapel was the vestibule, the middle chapel the baptistery, and the north chapel the chamber in which the patriarch chrismated the newly baptized before leading them into the rotunda north of this complex. Now they are dedicated as (from south to north):

- The Chapel of St. James the Just (Greek Orthodox),
- The Chapel of St. John the Baptist (Greek Orthodox),
- The Chapel of the Forty Martyrs of Sebaste (Greek Orthodox; at the base of the bell tower).

=== Bell tower ===
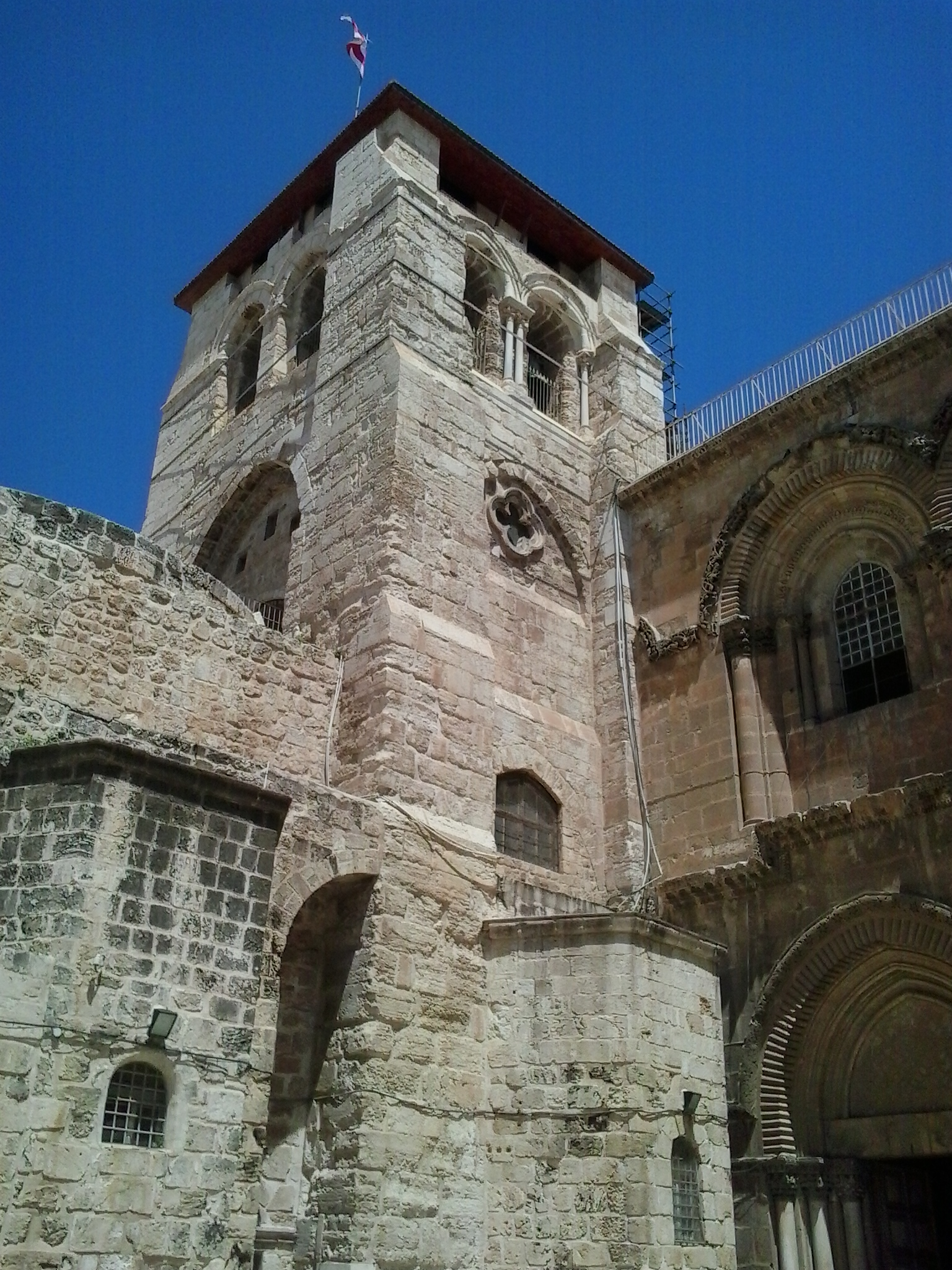
Bell tower left of the entrance

The 12th-century Crusader bell tower is just south of the Rotunda, to the left of the entrance. Its uppermost level was lost in a 1545 collapse. In 1719, another two storeys were lost.

=== Façade and entrance ===
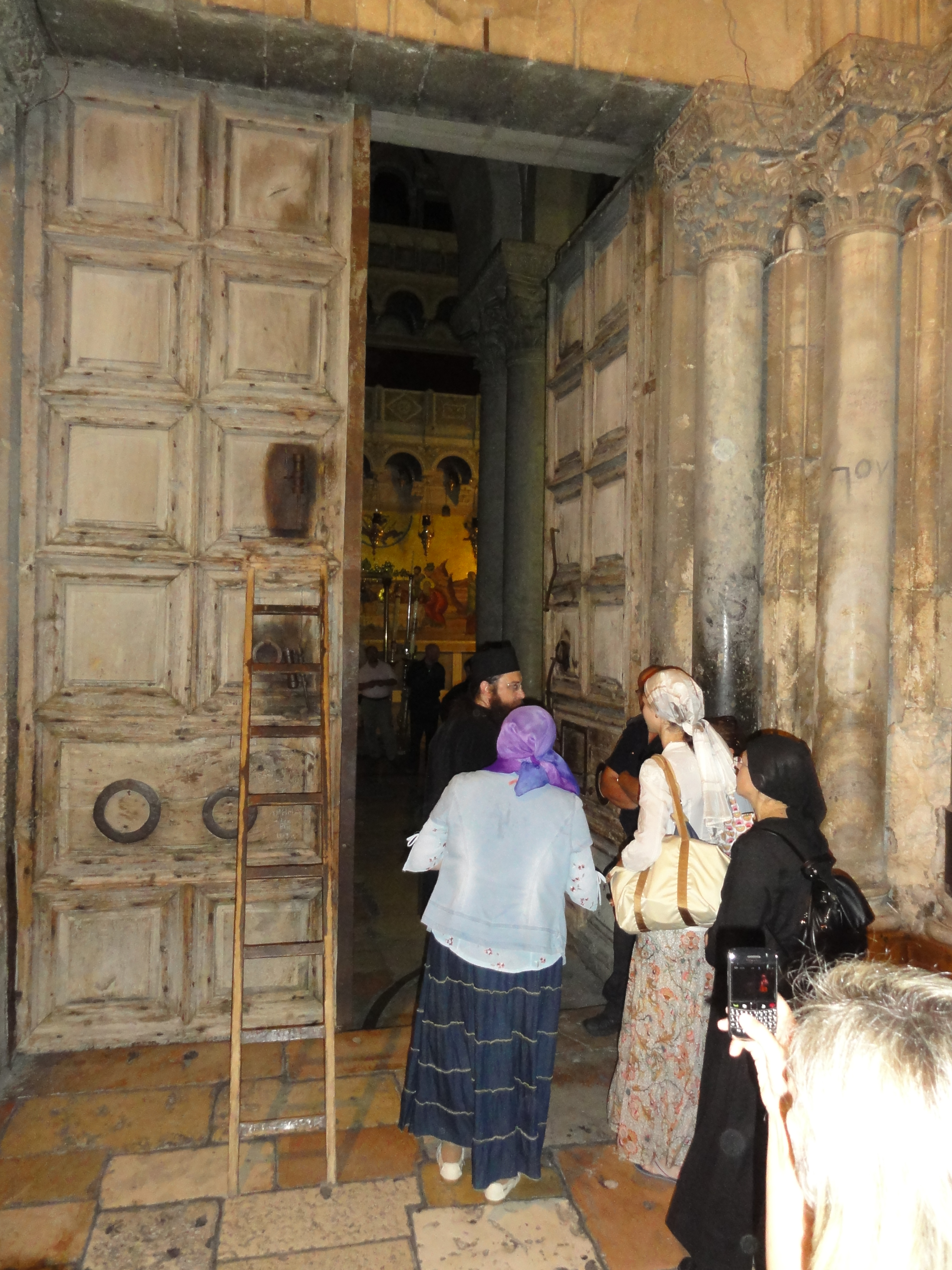
Entrance door

The façade and entrance have undergone significant changes since their construction in the 12th century. The entrance doors were originally topped with ornate lintels, and their tympanums were decorated with mosaics. The doors themselves were likely decorated with sculpture. Today, the original lintels are on display at the Rockefeller Archeological Museum, the mosaics are completely missing, and nothing of the original doors remains. Only the left-hand entrance is currently accessible, as the right doorway has long since been bricked up. The entrance to the church leads to the south transept, through the crusader façade in the parvis of a larger courtyard. This is found past a group of streets winding through the outer Via Dolorosa by way of a souq in the Muristan. This narrow way of access to such a large structure has proven to be hazardous at times. For example, when a fire broke out in 1840, dozens of pilgrims were trampled to death.

The church is open to pilgrims and visitors, and entrance is generally free. Because it remains an active place of worship, access to some chapels may be affected by liturgies, processions, or denominational services. Visitors are generally expected to dress modestly, and queues often form for entry into the Aedicule, especially during major pilgrimage seasons.

According to their own family lore, the Muslim Nuseibeh family has been responsible for opening the door as a neutral party to the church's denominations already since the seventh century. However, they themselves admit the documents held by various Christian denominations only mention their role since the 12th century in the time of Saladin, which is the more generally accepted date. After retaking Jerusalem from the Crusaders in 1187, Saladin entrusted the Joudeh family with the key to the church, which is made of iron and 30 centimetres (12 in) long; the Nuseibehs either became or remained the doorkeepers.

The 'immovable ladder' stands beneath a window on the façade.

=== Calvary (Golgotha) ===
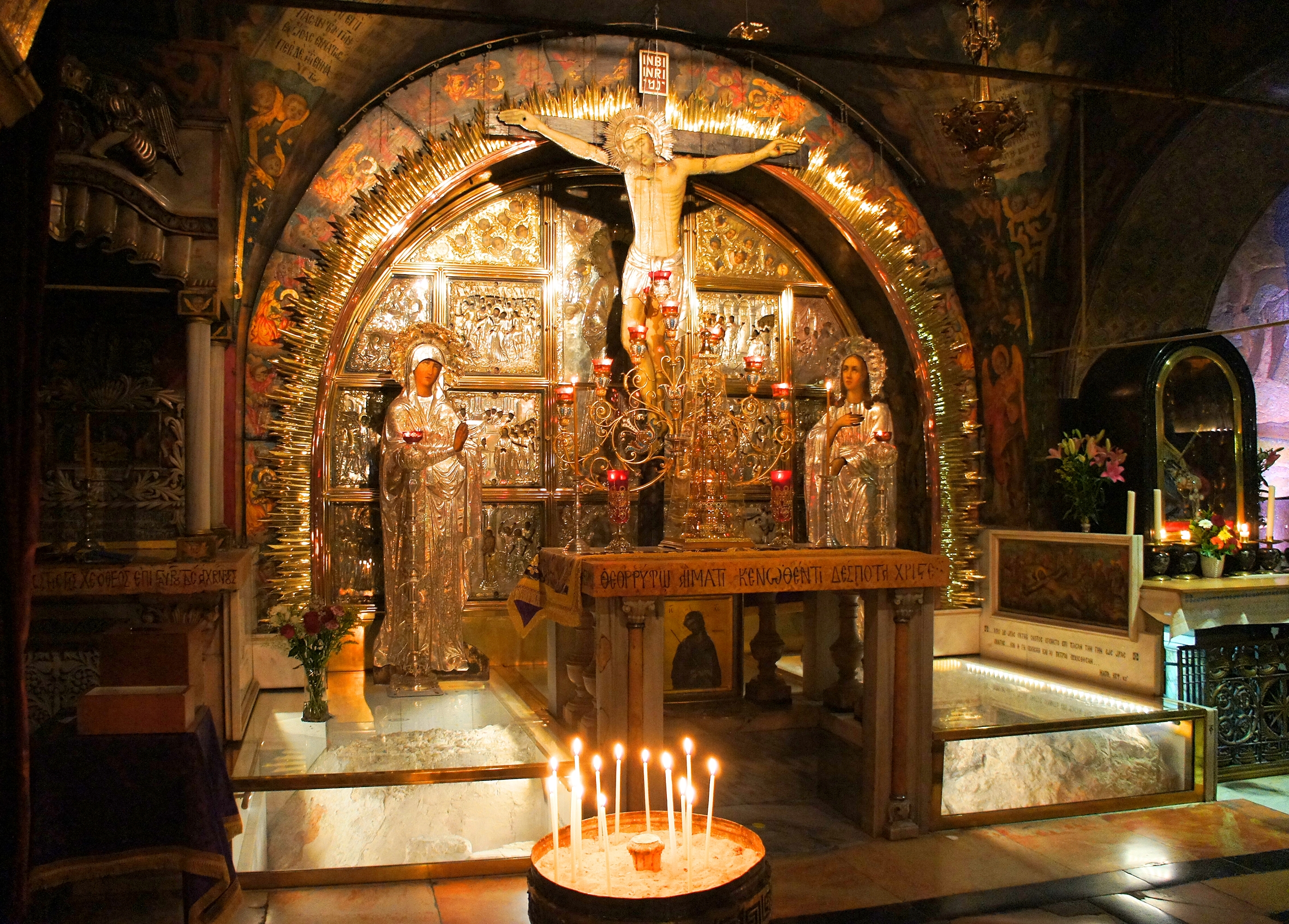
The Altar of the Crucifixion, where The Rock of Calvary (bottom) is encased in glass

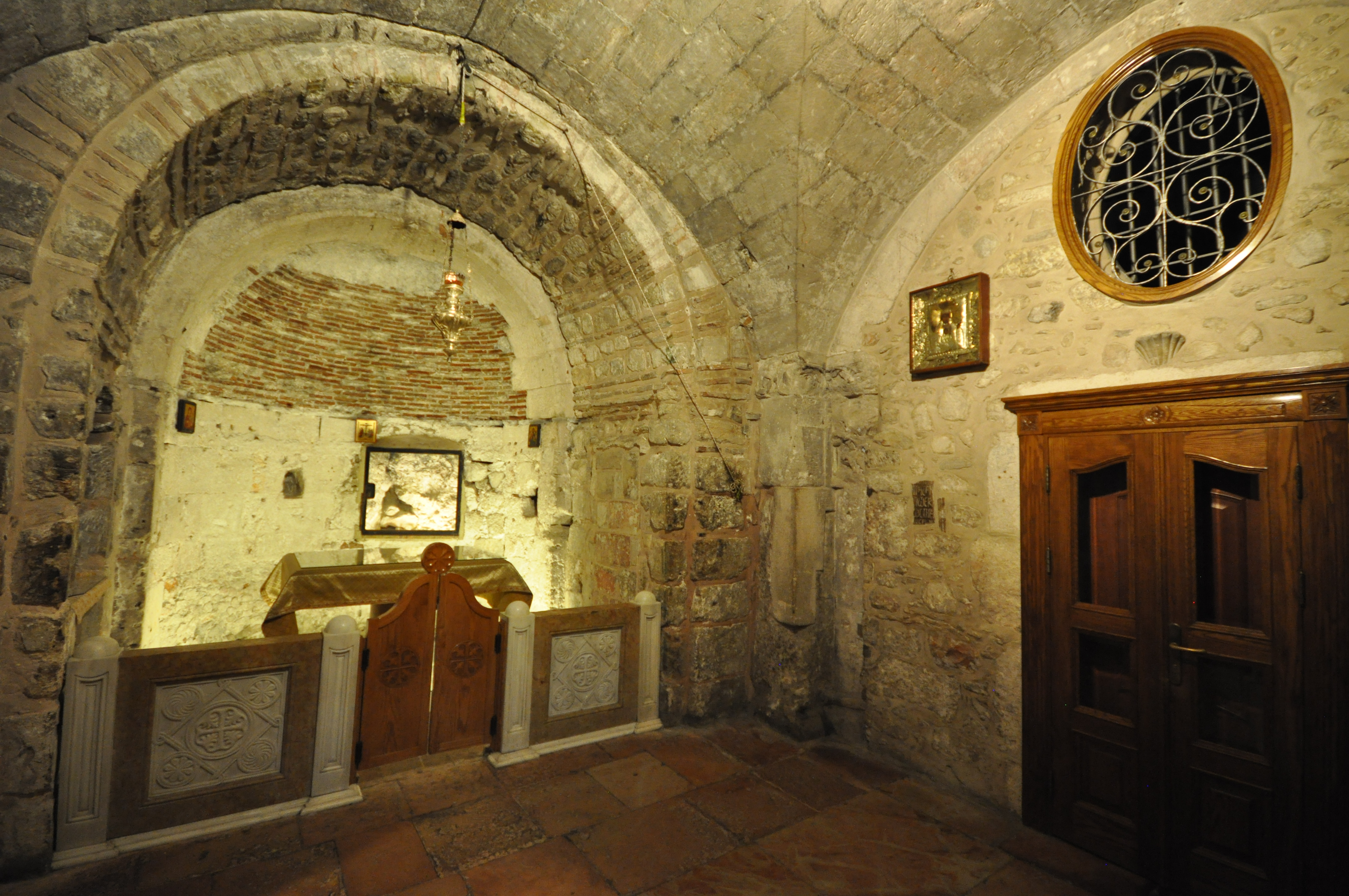
Chapel of Adam in the Church of the Holy Sepluchre

Just inside the church entrance is a stairway leading up to Calvary (Golgotha), traditionally regarded as the site of Jesus's crucifixion and the most lavishly decorated part of the church. The exit is via another stairway opposite the first, leading down to the ambulatory. Golgotha and its chapels are just south of the main altar of the catholicon.

Calvary is split into two chapels: one Greek Orthodox and one Catholic, each with its own altar. On the left (north) side, the Greek Orthodox chapel's altar is placed over the supposed rock of Calvary (the 12th Station of the Cross), which can be touched through a hole in the floor beneath the altar. The rock can be seen under protective glass on both sides of the altar. The softer surrounding stone was removed when the church was built. The Roman Catholic (Franciscan) Chapel of the Nailing to the Cross (the 11th Station of the Cross) stretches to the south. Between the Catholic Altar of the Nailing to the Cross and the Orthodox altar is the Catholic Altar of the Stabat Mater, which enshrines an 18th-century bust of the Virgin Mary with numerous ex-votos; this middle altar marks the 13th Station of the Cross.

On the ground floor, just underneath the Golgotha chapel, is the Chapel of Adam. According to tradition, Jesus was crucified over the place where Adam's skull was buried. According to some, the blood of Christ ran down the cross and through the rocks to fill Adam's skull. Through a window at the back of the 11th-century apse, the rock of Calvary can be seen with a crack traditionally held to be caused by the earthquake that followed Jesus's death; some scholars claim it is the result of quarrying against a natural flaw in the rock.

Behind the Chapel of Adam is the Greek Treasury (Treasury of the Greek Patriarch). Some of its relics, such as a 12th-century crystal mitre, were transferred to the Greek Orthodox Patriarchate Museum (the Patriarchal Museum) on Greek Orthodox Patriarchate Street.

=== Stone of Unction ===
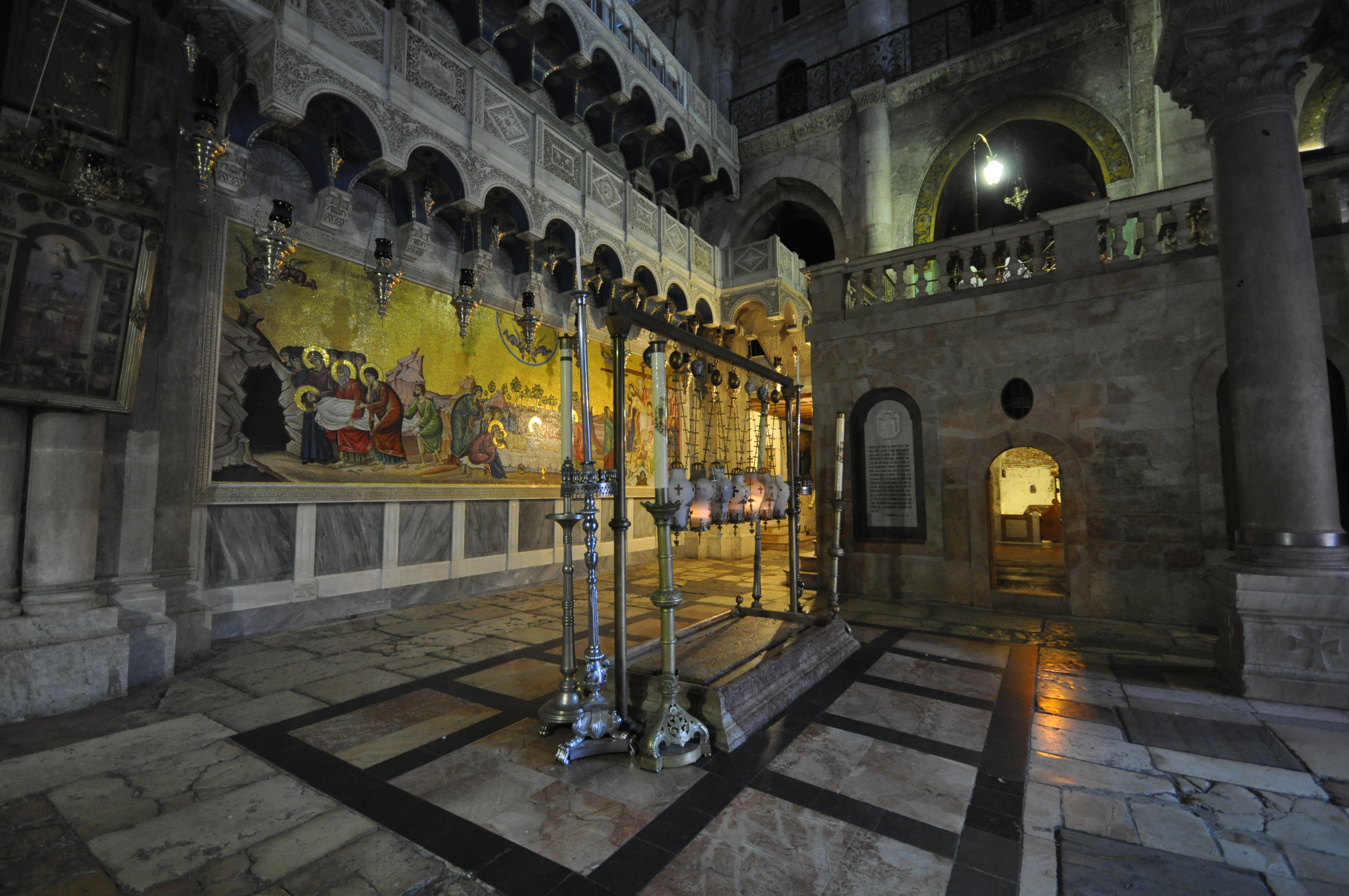
The Stone of Unction, where Jesus's body is said to have been anointed before burial

Just inside the entrance to the church is the Stone of Unction (also the Stone of Anointing or Stone of the Anointing), which tradition holds to be where Jesus's body was prepared for burial by Joseph of Arimathea, though this tradition is only attested since the Crusader era (notably by the Italian Dominican pilgrim Riccoldo da Monte di Croce in 1288), and the present stone was only added in the 1810 reconstruction.

The wall behind the stone is defined by its striking blue balconies and taphos symbol–bearing red banners (depicting the insignia of the Brotherhood of the Holy Sepulchre), and is decorated with lamps. The modern mosaic along the wall depicts the anointing of Jesus's body, preceded on the right by the Descent from the Cross, and succeeded on the left by the Burial of Jesus.

The wall was a temporary addition to support the arch above it, which had been weakened after the damage in the 1808 fire; it blocks the view of the rotunda, separates the entrance from the catholicon, sits on top of four of the now empty and desecrated Crusader graves and is no longer structurally necessary. Opinions differ as to whether it is to be seen as the 13th Station of the Cross, which others identify as the lowering of Jesus from the cross and located between the 11th and 12th stations on Calvary.

The lamps that hang over the Stone of Unction, adorned with cross-bearing chain links, are contributed by Armenians, Copts, Greeks and Latins.

Immediately inside and to the left of the entrance is a bench (formerly a divan) that has traditionally been used by the church's Muslim doorkeepers, along with some Christian clergy, as well as electrical wiring. To the right of the entrance is a wall along the ambulatory containing the staircase leading to Golgotha. Further along the same wall is the entrance to the Chapel of Adam.

=== Rotunda and Aedicule ===
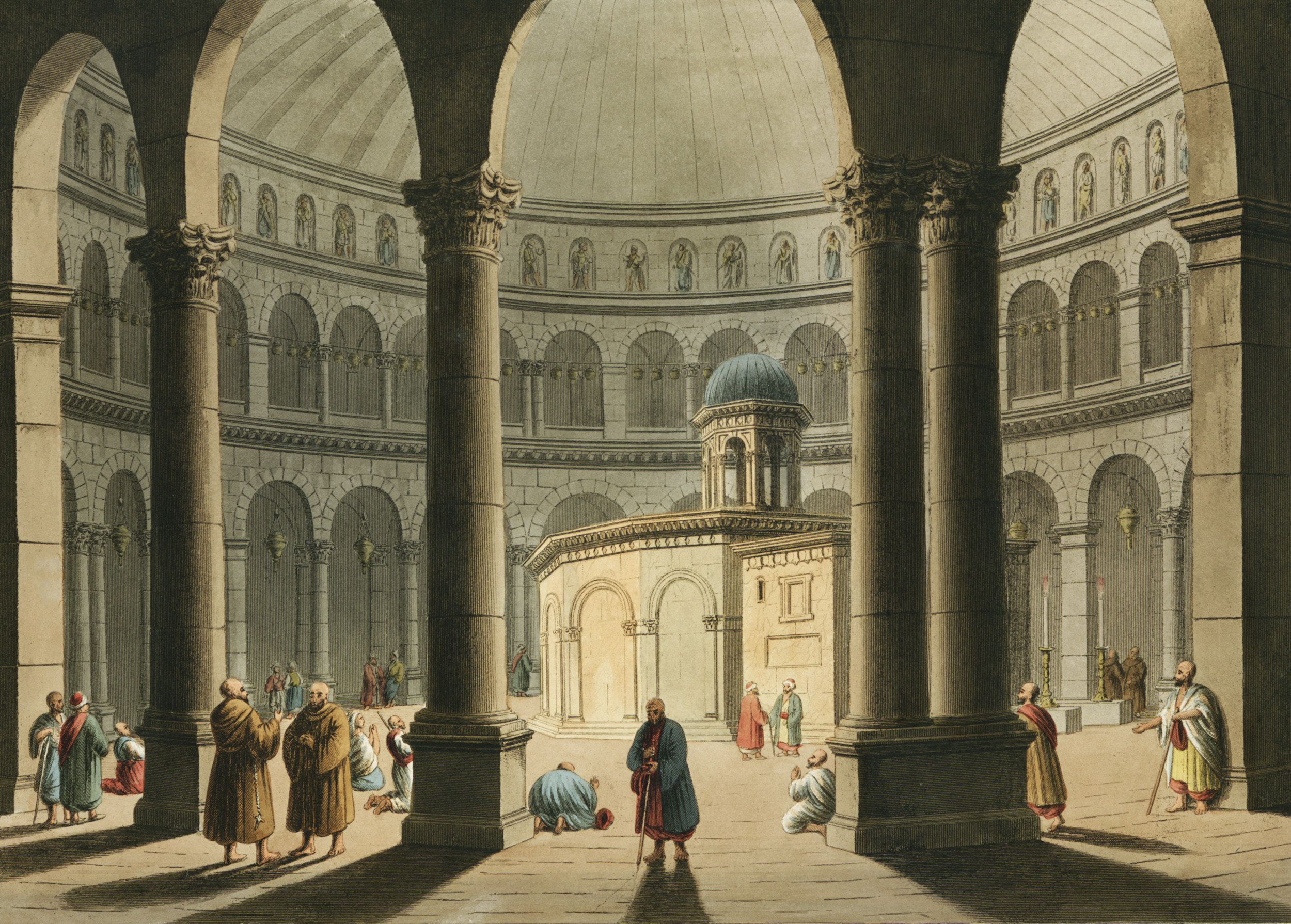
Rotunda interior painted by Luigi Mayer, before 1804

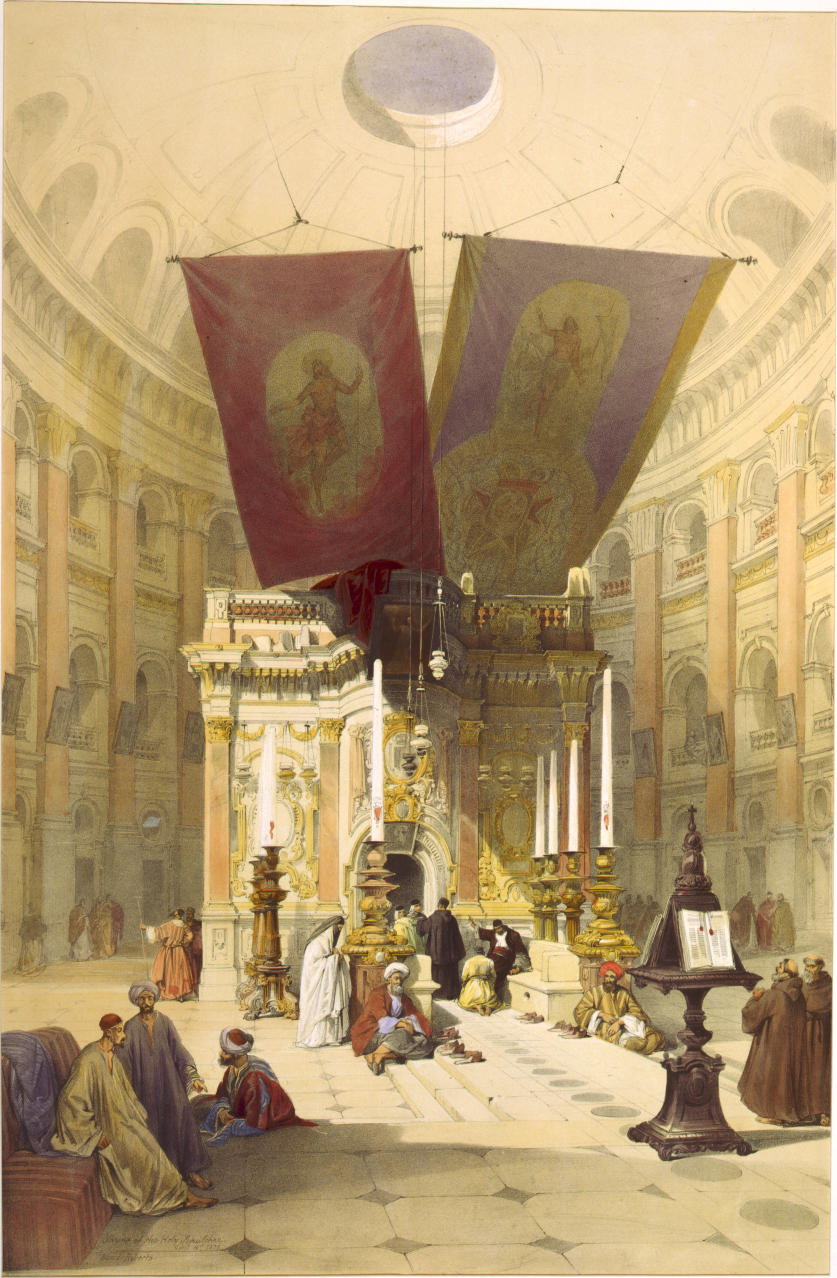
1842 lithograph of the Aedicule built after the 1808 fire, after David Roberts

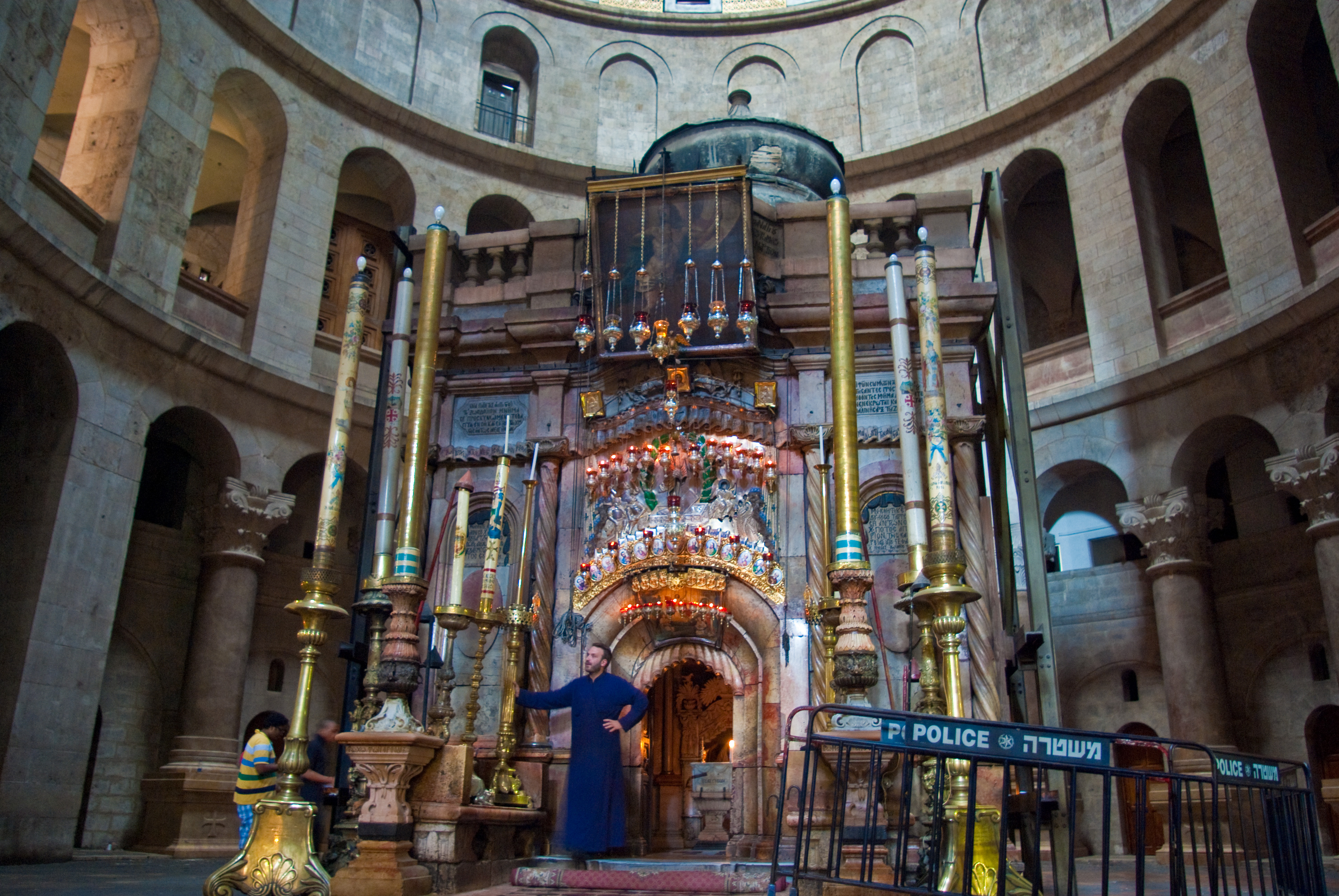
The Aedicule containing the traditional burial of Jesus

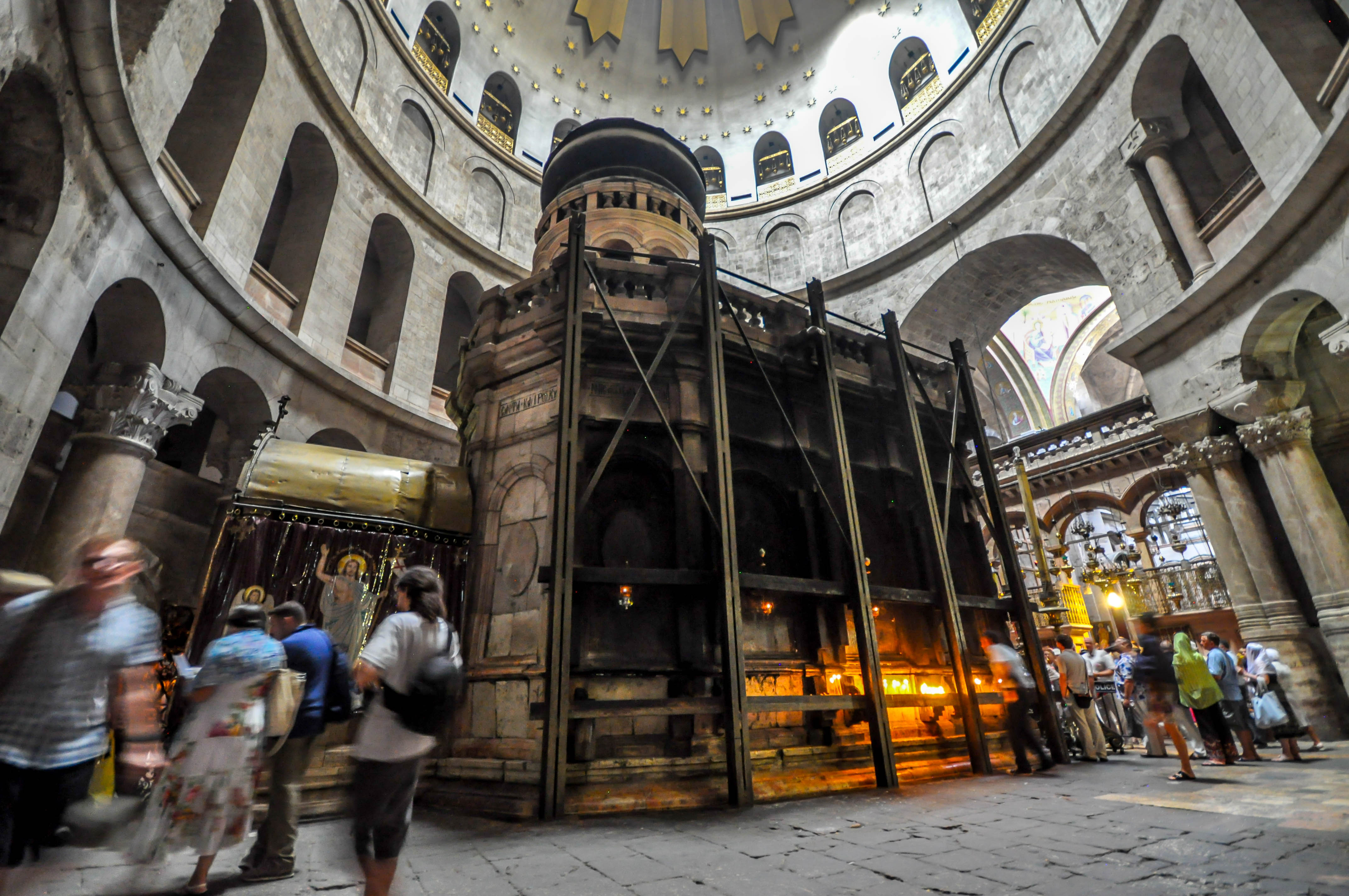
The Aedicule with the Coptic chapel to the left with golden roof; main entrance to the right

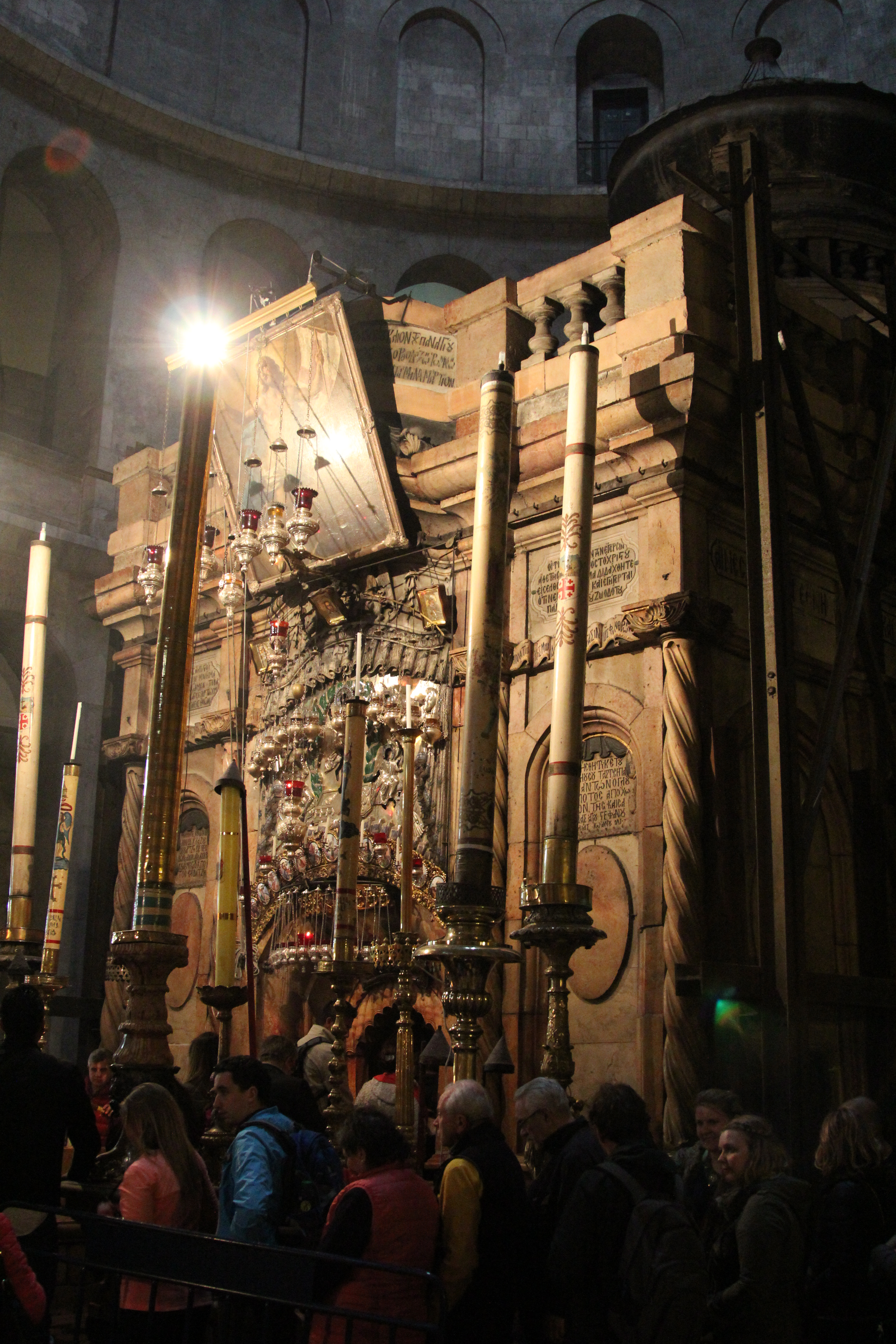
Facade of the Aedicule with pilgrims

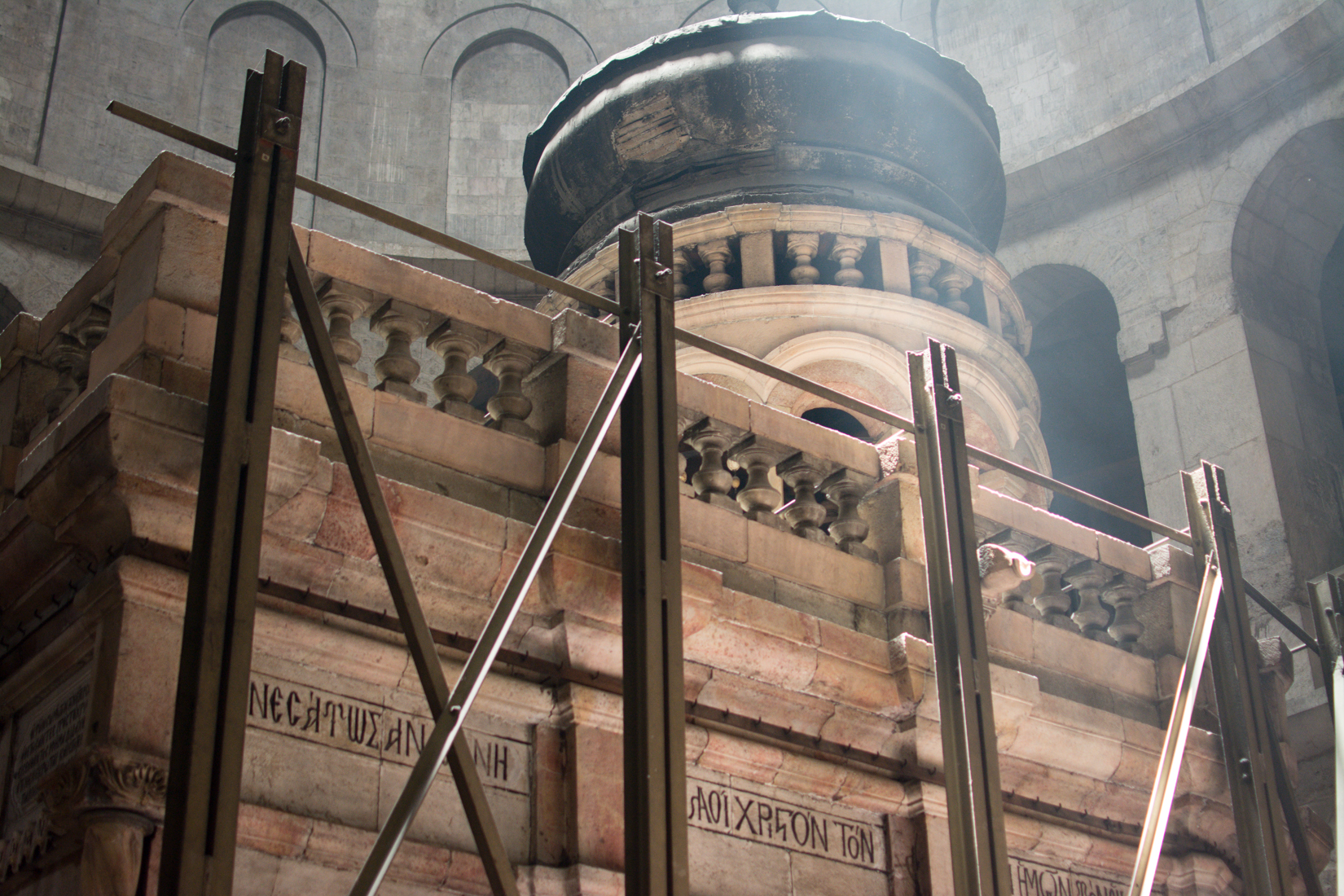
Detail of Aedicule with temporary supports, prior to the 2016 restoration

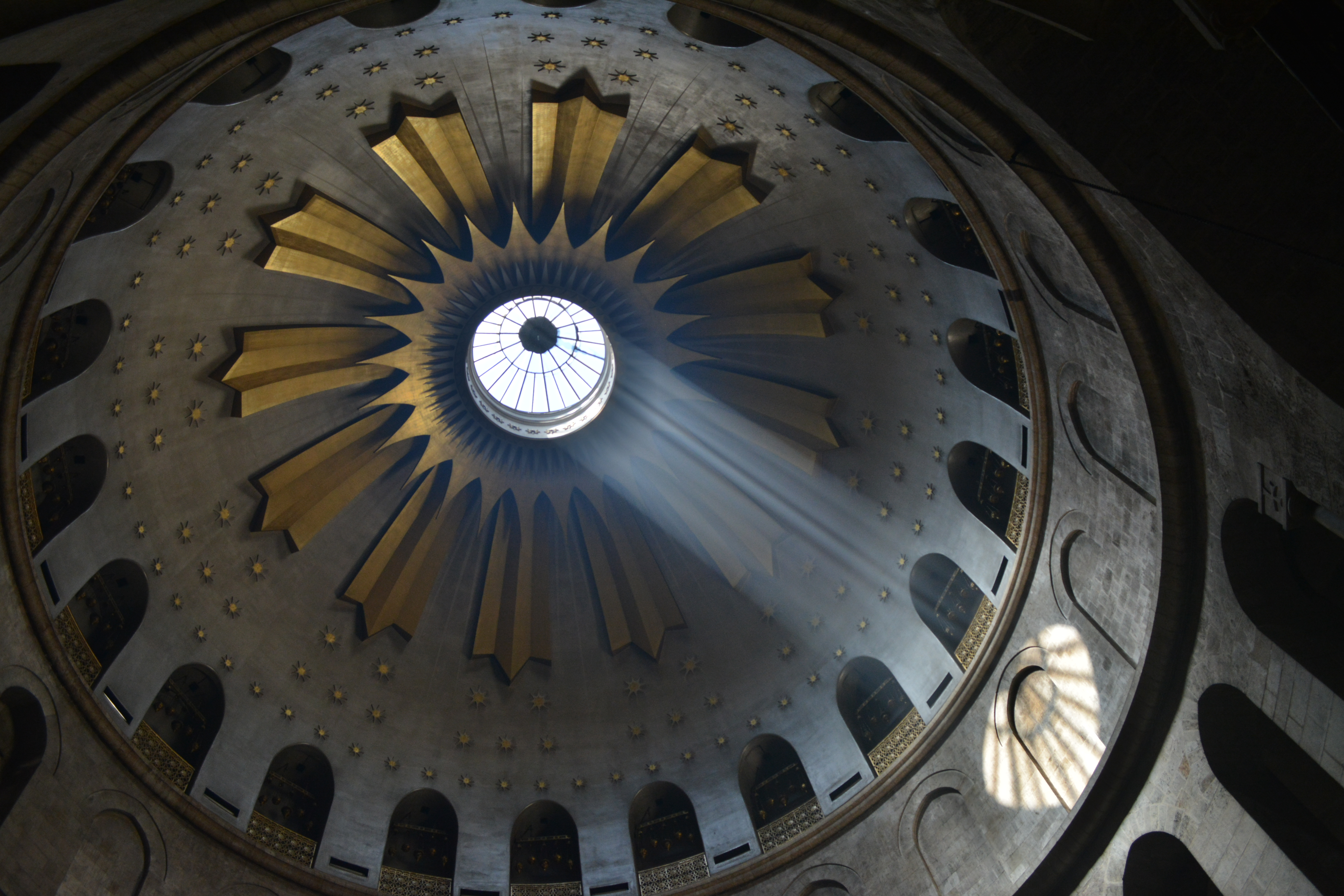
The Dome of the Anastasis above the aedicule

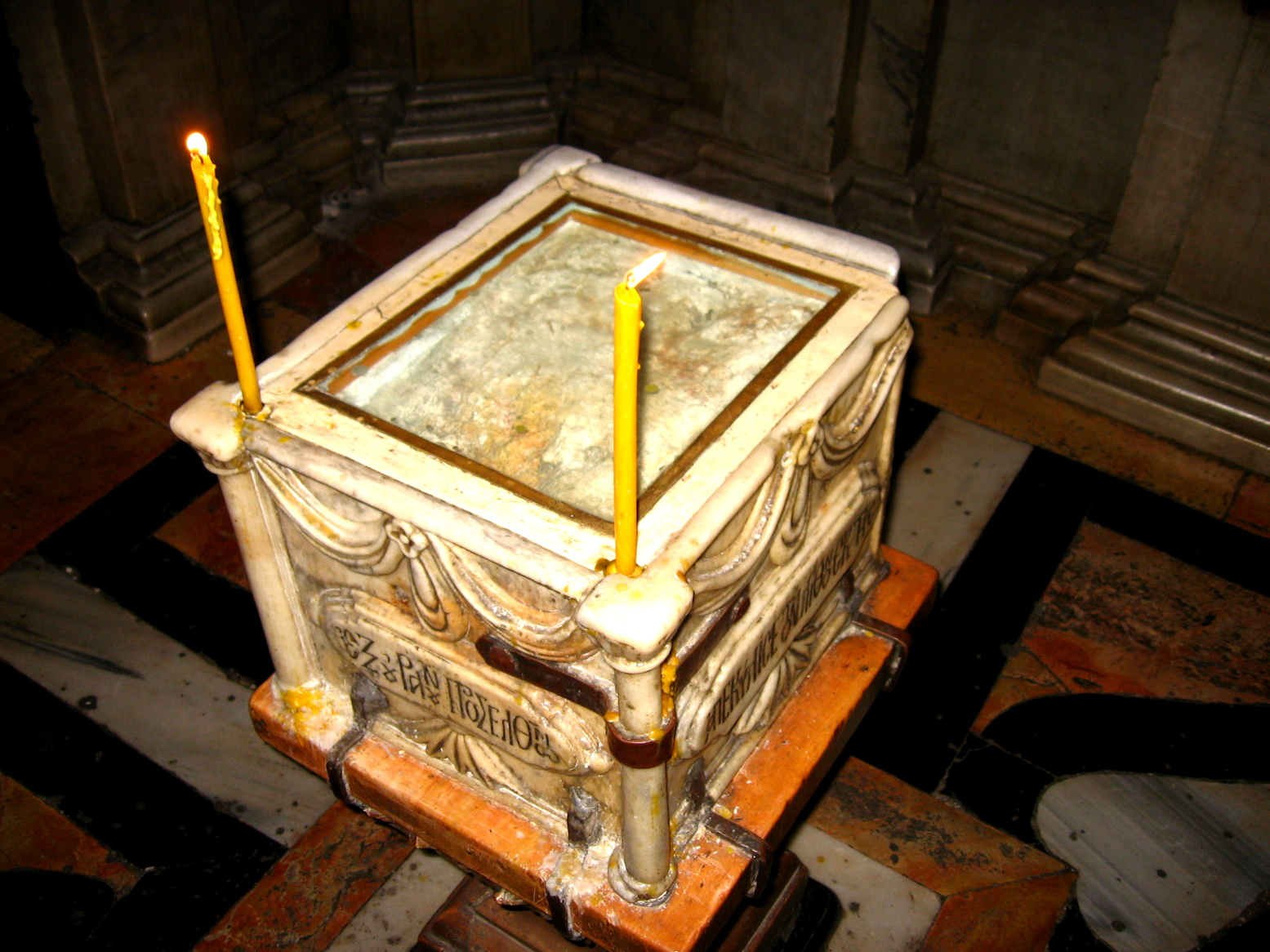
Angel's Stone in the first chamber inside the aedicula

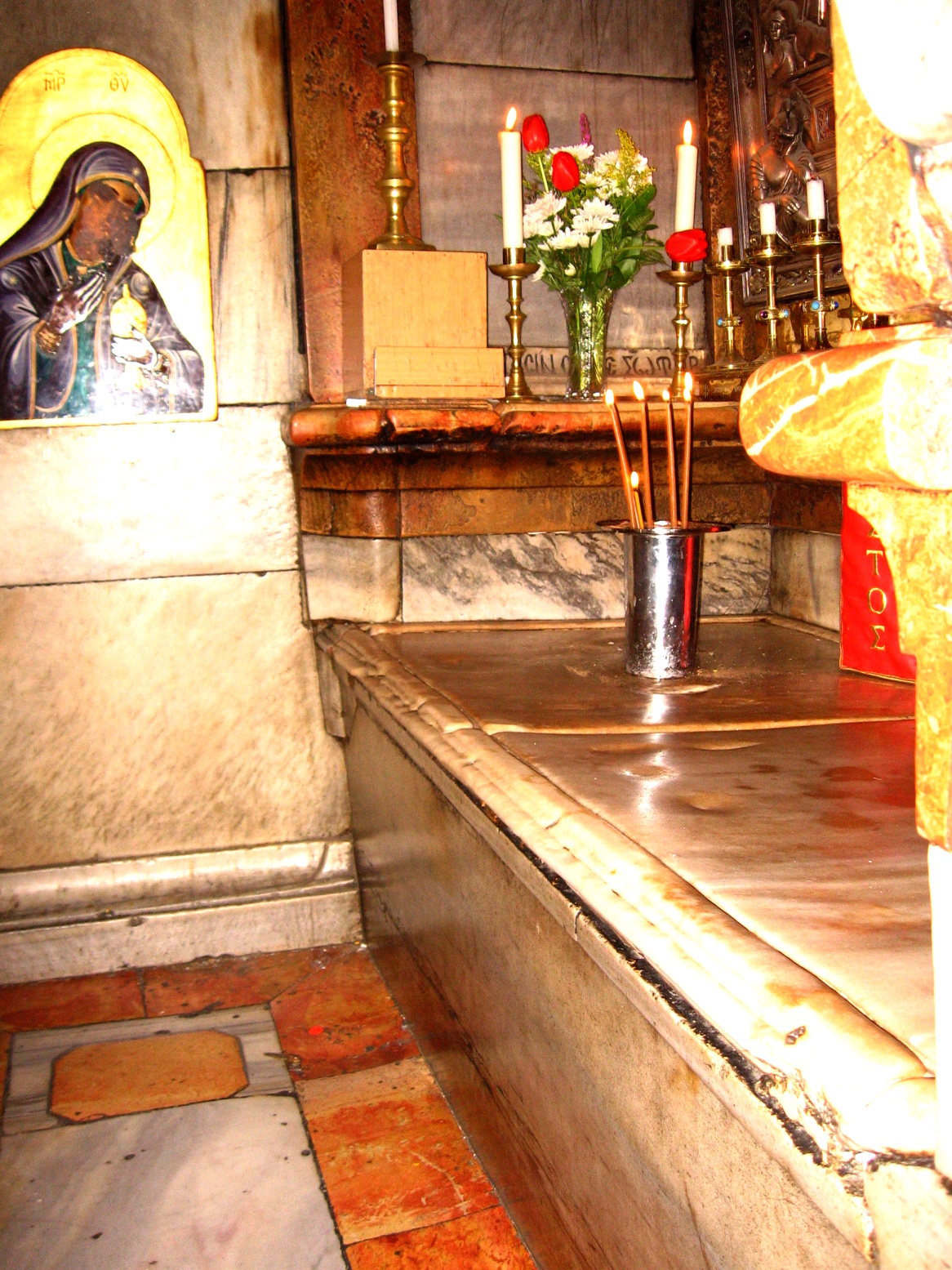
The Tomb of Jesus (raised platform to the right, interior the second chamber inside the aedicula)

The rotunda is the building of the larger dome located on the far west side. In the centre of the rotunda is a small chapel called the Aedicule in English, from the Latin aedicula, in reference to a small shrine. (Note: The word is Kouvouklion in Greek (Kουβούκλιον, modern Greek for "small compartment").) The Aedicule has two rooms: the first has a pedestal with a relic called the Angel's Stone, which is believed to be a fragment of the large stone that sealed the tomb; the second, smaller room contains the tomb of Jesus. Possibly to prevent pilgrims from removing bits of the original rock as souvenirs, by 1555, a surface of marble cladding was placed on the tomb to prevent further damage to the tomb. In October 2016, the top slab of the burial bed was pulled back to reveal an older, partially broken marble slab with a Crusader-style cross carved in it. Beneath it, the limestone burial bed was revealed to be intact.

Under the Status Quo, the Eastern Orthodox, Roman Catholic, and Armenian Apostolic Churches all have rights to the interior of the tomb, and all three communities celebrate the Divine Liturgy or Holy Mass there daily. It is also used for other ceremonies on special occasions, such as the Holy Saturday ceremony of the Holy Fire led by the Greek Orthodox patriarch (with the participation of the Coptic and Armenian patriarchs). To its rear, in the Coptic Chapel, constructed of iron latticework, lies the altar used by the Coptic Orthodox. Historically, the Georgians also retained the key to the Aedicule.

To the right of the sepulchre on the northwestern edge of the rotunda is the Chapel of the Apparition, which is reserved for Roman Catholic use.

Though not within the Church of the Holy Sepulchre compound, directly adjacent to it is the Church of the Redeemer, marking a Lutheran presence at the site.

=== Catholicon ===
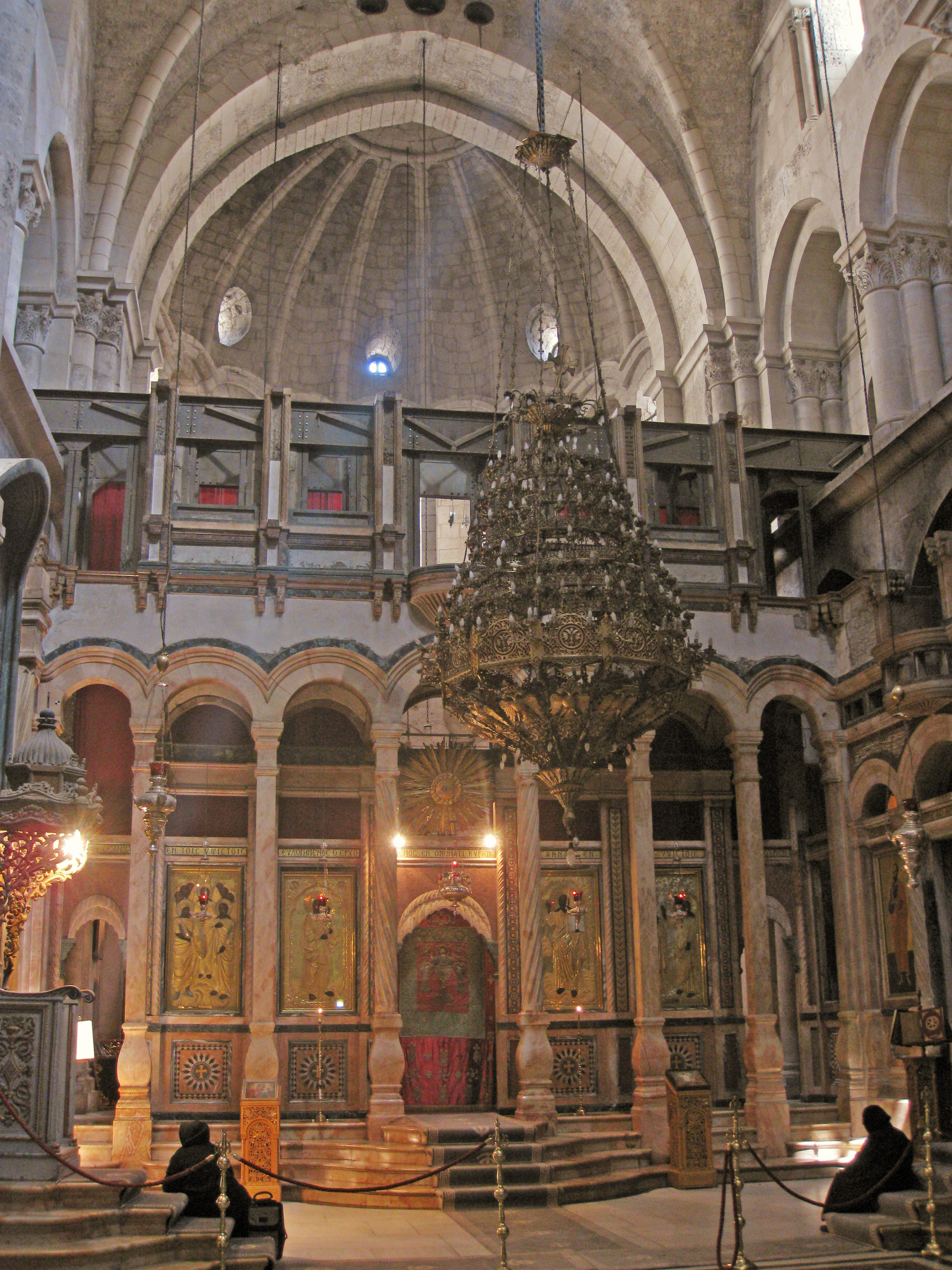
East end of the Greek Orthodox catholicon, with its iconostasis

In the central nave of the Crusader-era church, just east of the larger rotunda, is the Crusader structure housing the main altar of the Church, today the Greek Orthodox catholicon. Its dome is 19.8 metres (65 ft) in diameter, and is set directly over the centre of the transept crossing of the choir where the compas is situated, an omphalos ("navel") stone once thought to be the center of the world and still venerated as such by Orthodox Christians (associated with the site of the Crucifixion and the Resurrection).

Since 1996, the main dome is topped by the monumental Golgotha Crucifix, which then-Greek Patriarch Diodoros I of Jerusalem had consecrated. It was the initiative of Israeli professor Gustav Kühnel to erect a new crucifix at the church that would not only be worthy of the singularity of the site, but also symbolise the efforts of unity among Christians.

The catholicon's iconostasis demarcates the Orthodox sanctuary behind it, to its east. The iconostasis is flanked to the front by two episcopal thrones: the southern seat (cathedra) is the patriarchal throne of the Greek Orthodox patriarch of Jerusalem, and the northern seat is for an archbishop or bishop. There is also a popular claim that both are patriarchal thrones, with the northern one being for the patriarch of Antioch – this has since been dispelled.

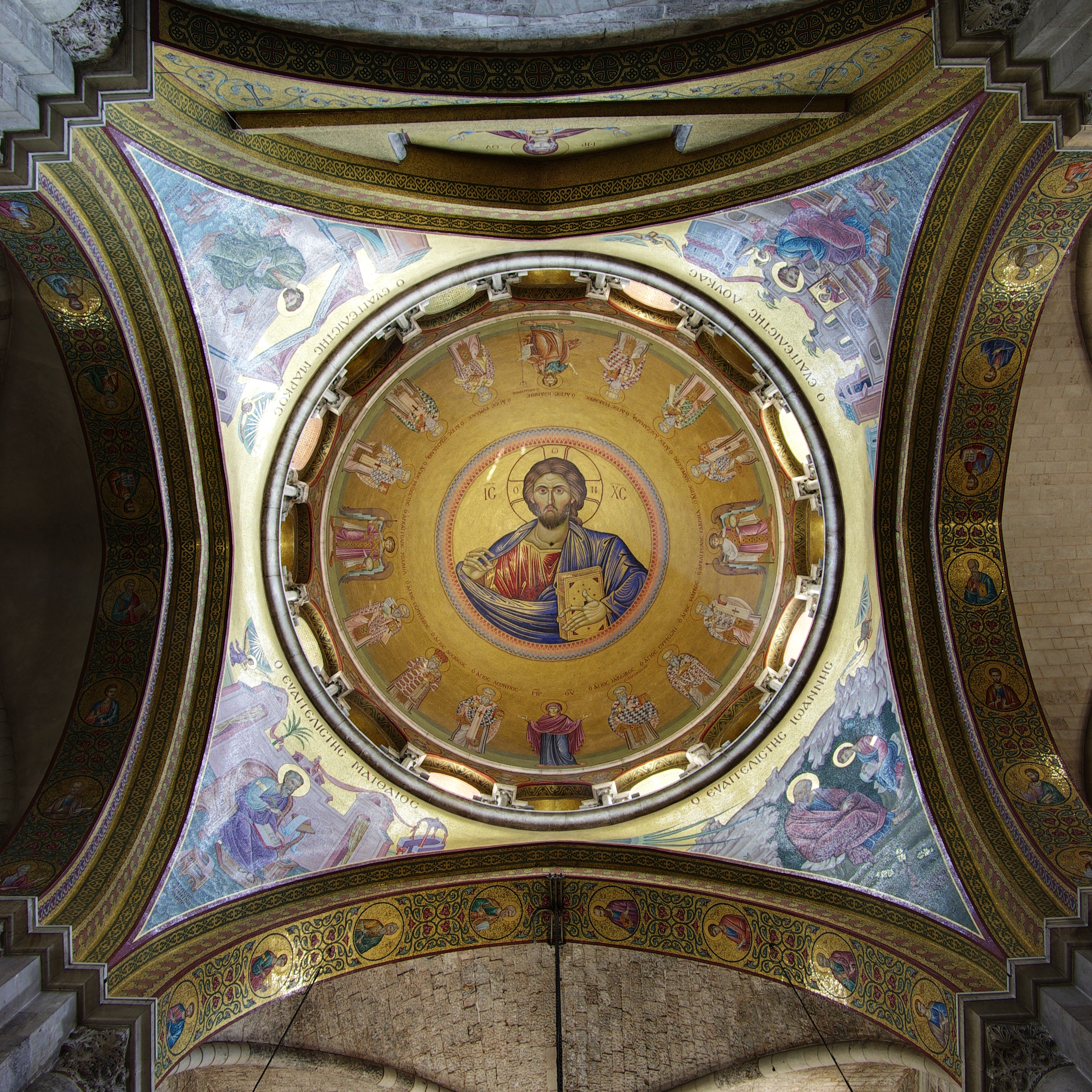
The Christ Pantocrator mosaic inside the catholicon dome

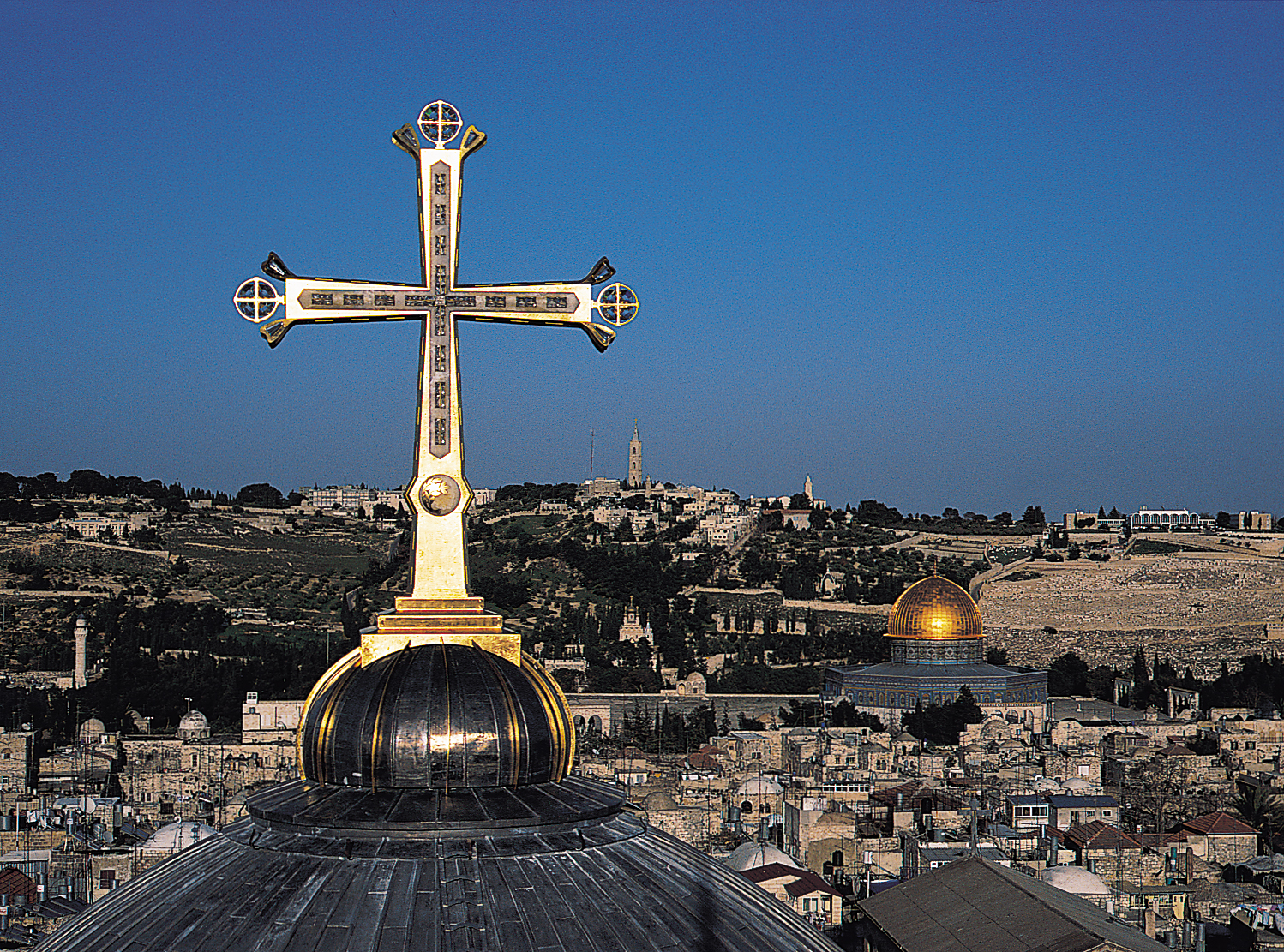
Cross over the catholicon

=== Armenian monastery south of the Aedicule ===
South of the Aedicule is the "Place of the Three Marys", marked by a stone canopy (the Station of the Holy Women) and a large modern wall mosaic. The canopy is a conical roof in typical Armenian style has hanging lamps, and a central oil lamp on the embossed floor. From here, one can enter the Armenian monastery, which stretches over the ground and first upper floor of the church's southeastern part.

=== Syriac Chapel with Tomb of Joseph of Arimathea ===
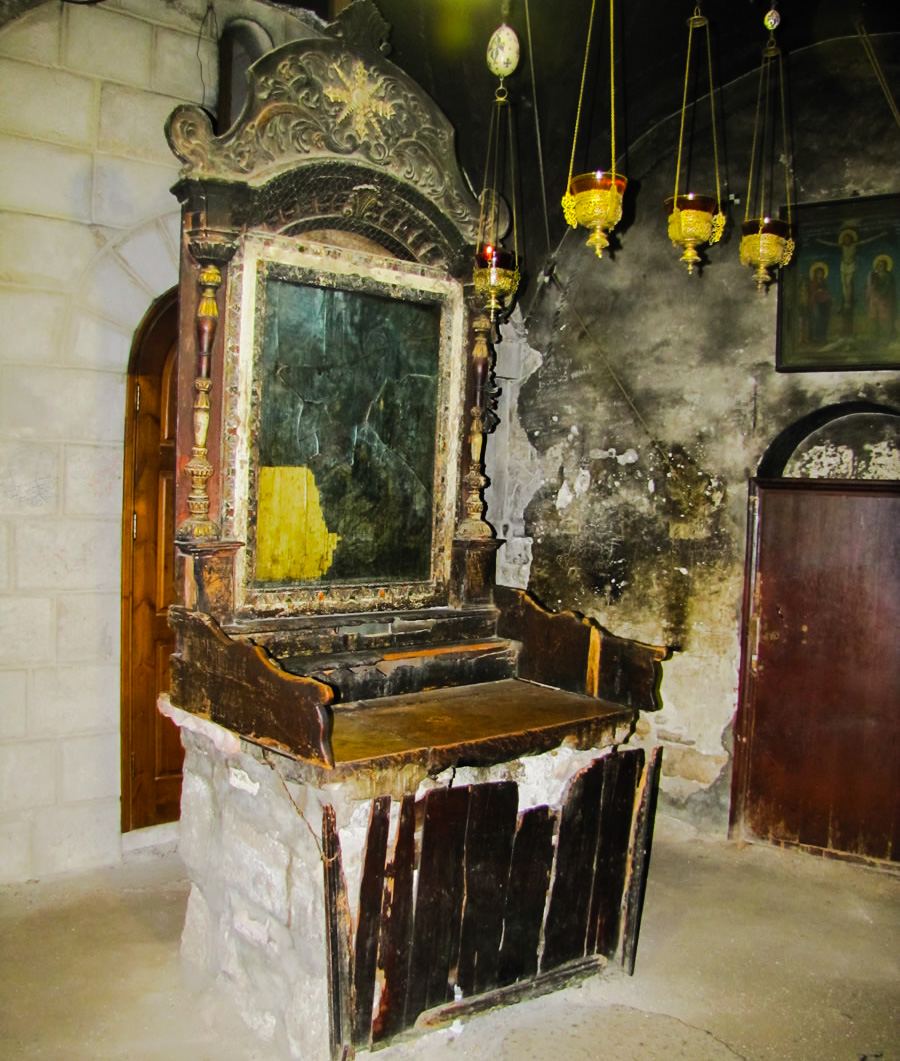
Altar in the Syriac chapel

West of the Aedicule, to the rear of the Rotunda, is the Syriac Chapel with the Tomb of Joseph of Arimathea, located in a Constantinian apse and containing an opening to an ancient Jewish rock-cut tomb. This chapel is where the Syriac Orthodox celebrate their Liturgy on Sundays.

The Syriac Orthodox Chapel of Saint Joseph of Arimathea and Saint Nicodemus. On Sundays and feast days it is furnished for the celebration of Mass. It is accessed from the Rotunda, by a door west of the Aedicule.

==== First-century tomb ====
On the far side of the chapel is the low entrance to an almost complete first-century Jewish tomb, initially holding six kokh-type funeral shafts radiating from a central chamber, two of which are still exposed. Although this space was discovered relatively recently and contains no identifying marks, some believe that Joseph of Arimathea and Nicodemus were buried here. Since Jews always buried their dead outside the city, the presence of this tomb seems to prove that the Holy Sepulchre site was indeed outside the city walls at the time of the Crucifixion.

=== Franciscan area north of the Aedicule ===
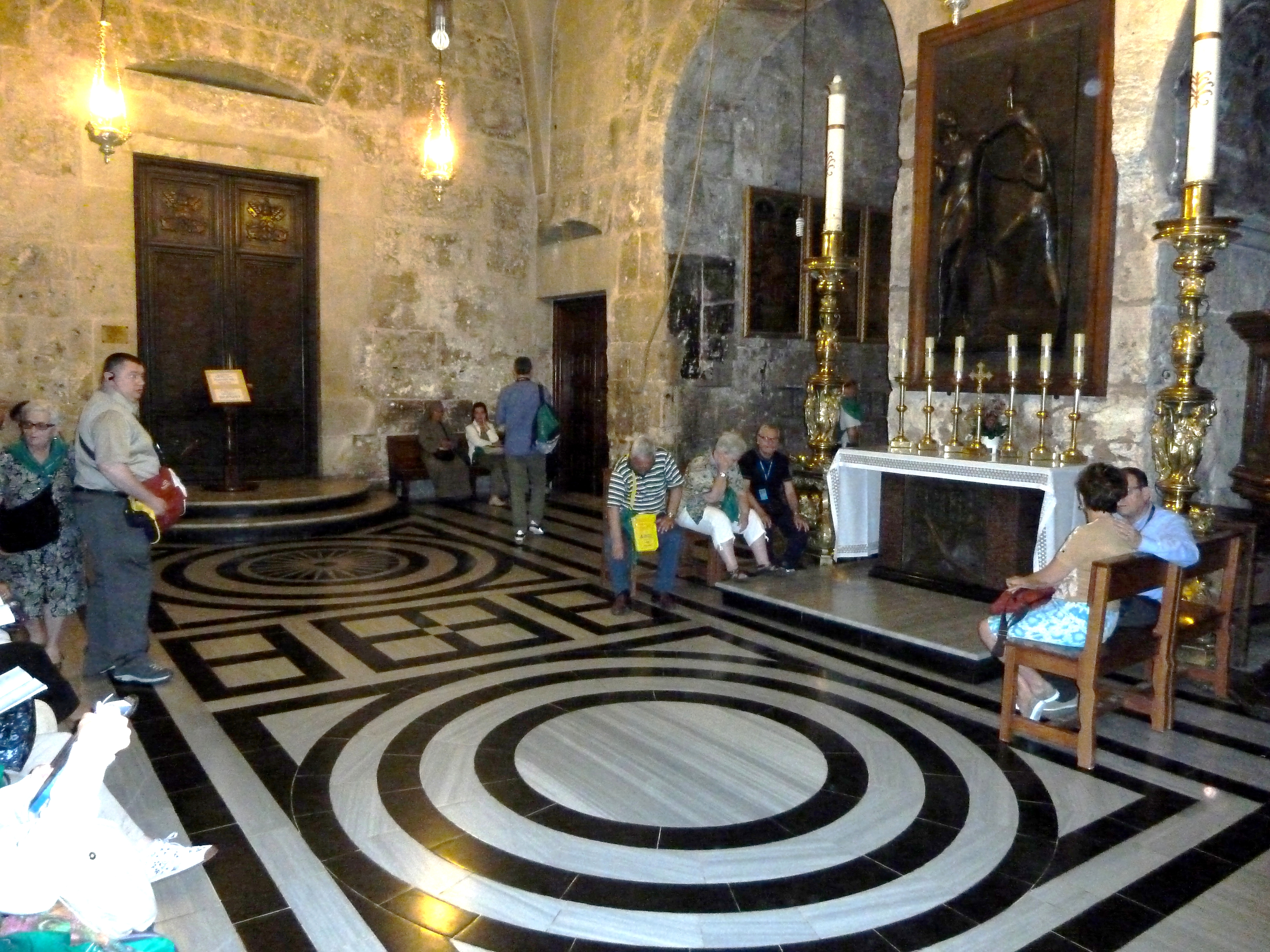
Chapel of Saint Mary Magdalene

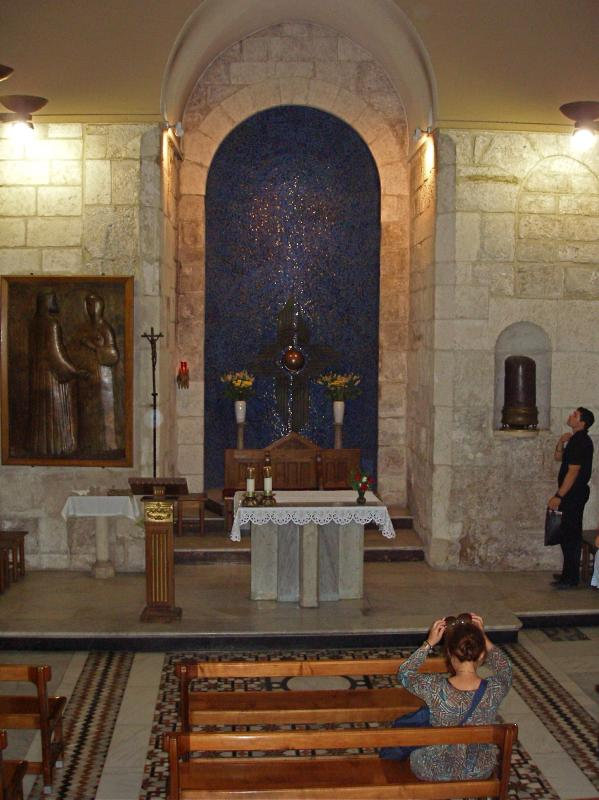
Chapel of the Apparition

- The Franciscan Chapel of St. Mary Magdalene – The chapel, an open area, indicates the place where Mary Magdalene met Jesus after his resurrection.
- The Franciscan Chapel of the Apparition (Chapel of the Blessed Sacrament), directly north of the above – in memory of Jesus's meeting with his mother after the Resurrection, a non-scriptural tradition. Here stands a piece of an ancient column, allegedly part of the one Jesus was tied to during his scourging.

=== Arches of the Virgin ===
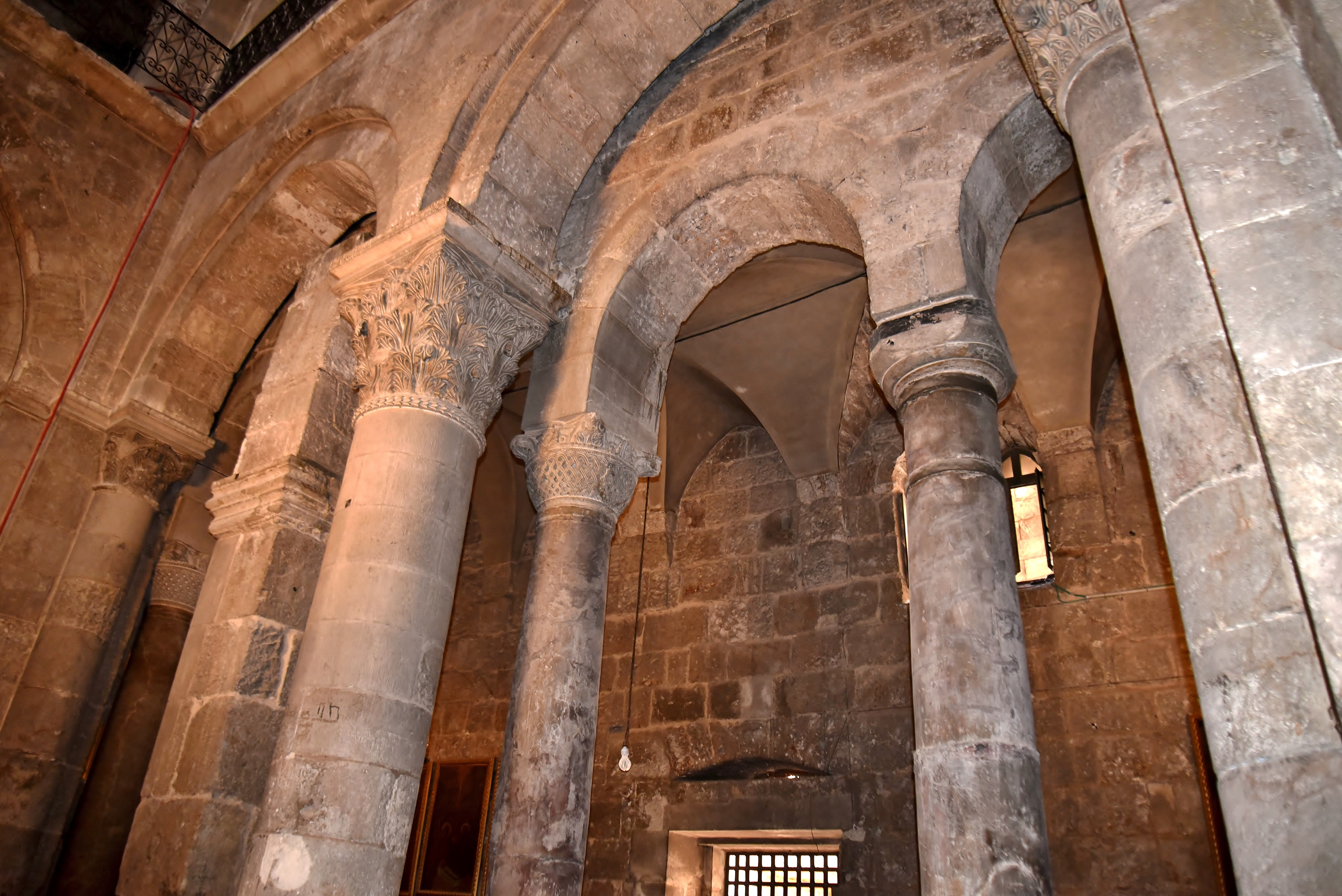
Arches of the Virgin

The Arches of the Virgin are seven arches (an arcade) at the northern end of the north transept, which is to the catholicon's north. Disputed by the Orthodox and the Latins, the area is used to store ladders. Over the years the Greek-Orthodox patriarchate placed several icons along the arcade. Dating mostly to the 19th century and designed in Orthodox Post-Byzantine style, they were restored in 2021.

=== Prison of Christ ===
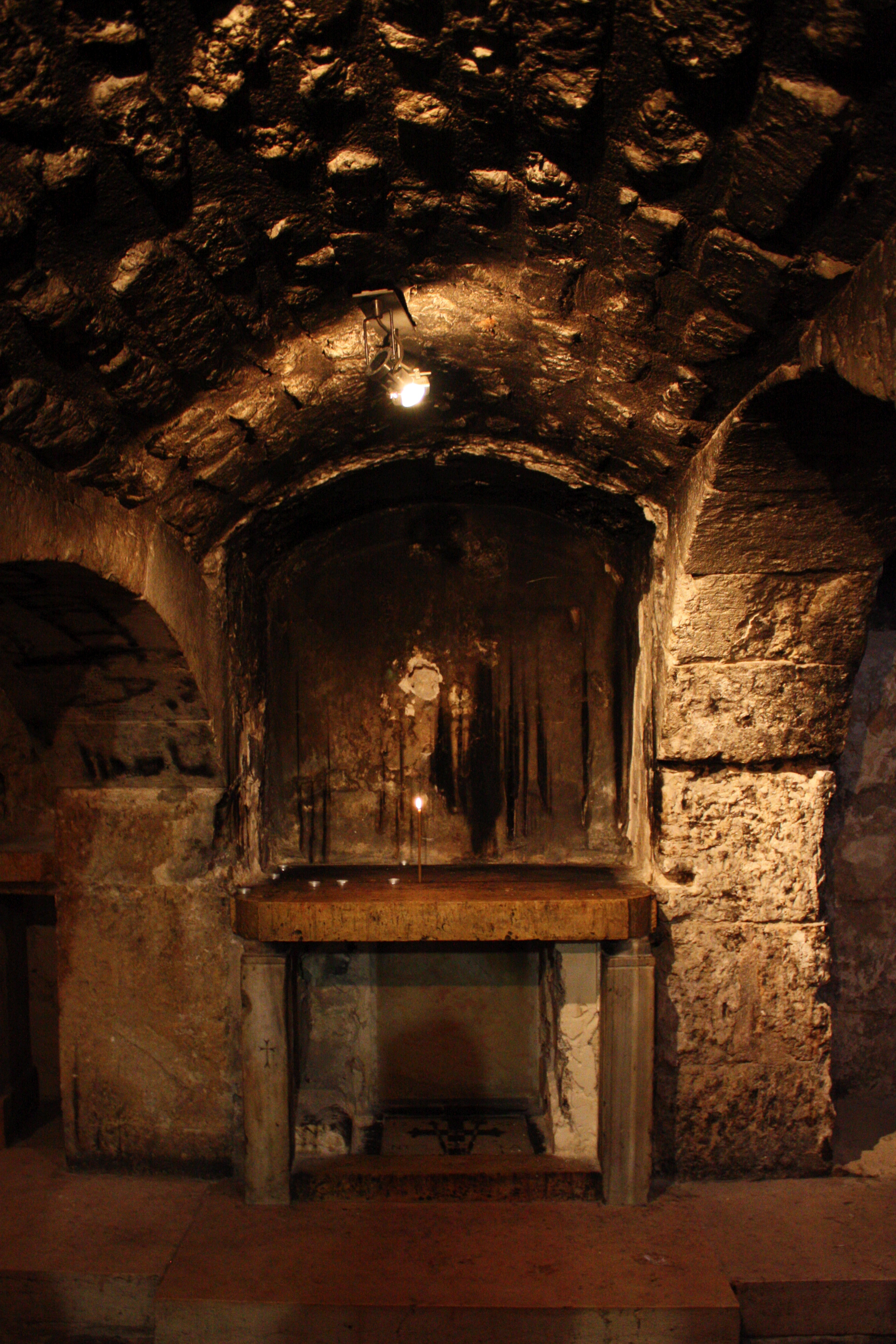
Prison of Christ before renovation

In the northeast side of the complex, there is the Prison of Christ, alleged to be where Jesus was held. The Greek Orthodox are showing pilgrims yet another place where Jesus was allegedly held, the similarly named Prison of Christ in their Monastery of the Praetorium, located near the Church of Ecce Homo, between the Second and Third Stations of the Via Dolorosa. The Armenians regard a recess in the Monastery of the Flagellation at the Second Station of the Via Dolorosa as the Prison of Christ. A cistern among the ruins beneath the Church of St. Peter in Gallicantu on Mount Zion is also alleged to have been the Prison of Christ. To reconcile the traditions, some allege that Jesus was held in the Mount Zion cell for his trial by the Jewish high priest, then at the Praetorium for his trial by the Roman governor Pontius Pilate, and near Golgotha before crucifixion.

=== Ambulatory ===
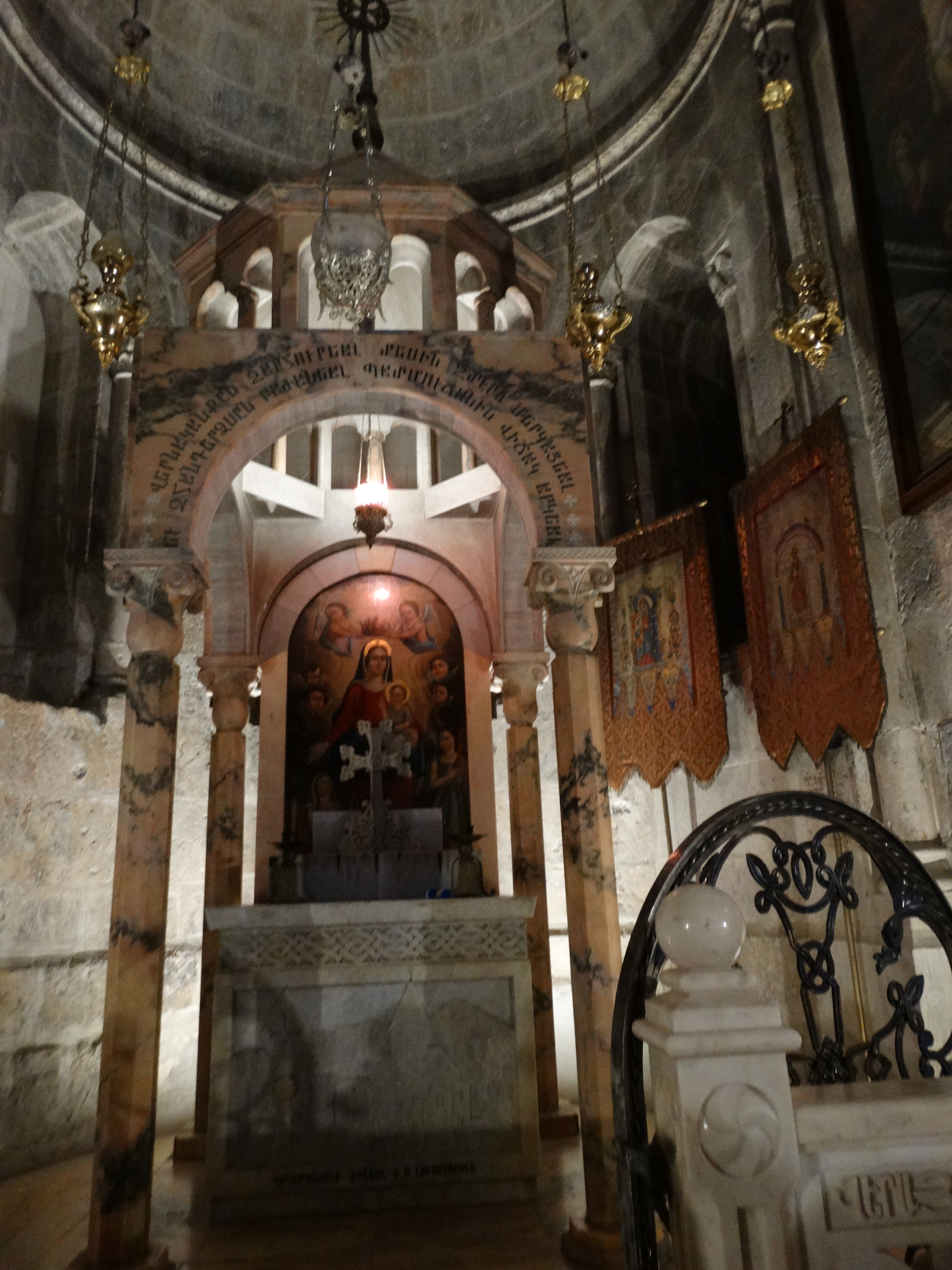
The Armenian Chapel of the Parting of the Raiment in the ambulatory

The chapels in the ambulatory are, from north to south: the Greek Chapel of Saint Longinus (named after Longinus), the Armenian Chapel of the Division of Robes (aka Parting of Garment), the entrance to the Chapel of Saint Helena, and the Greek Chapel of the Derision.

=== Chapel of Saint Helena ===
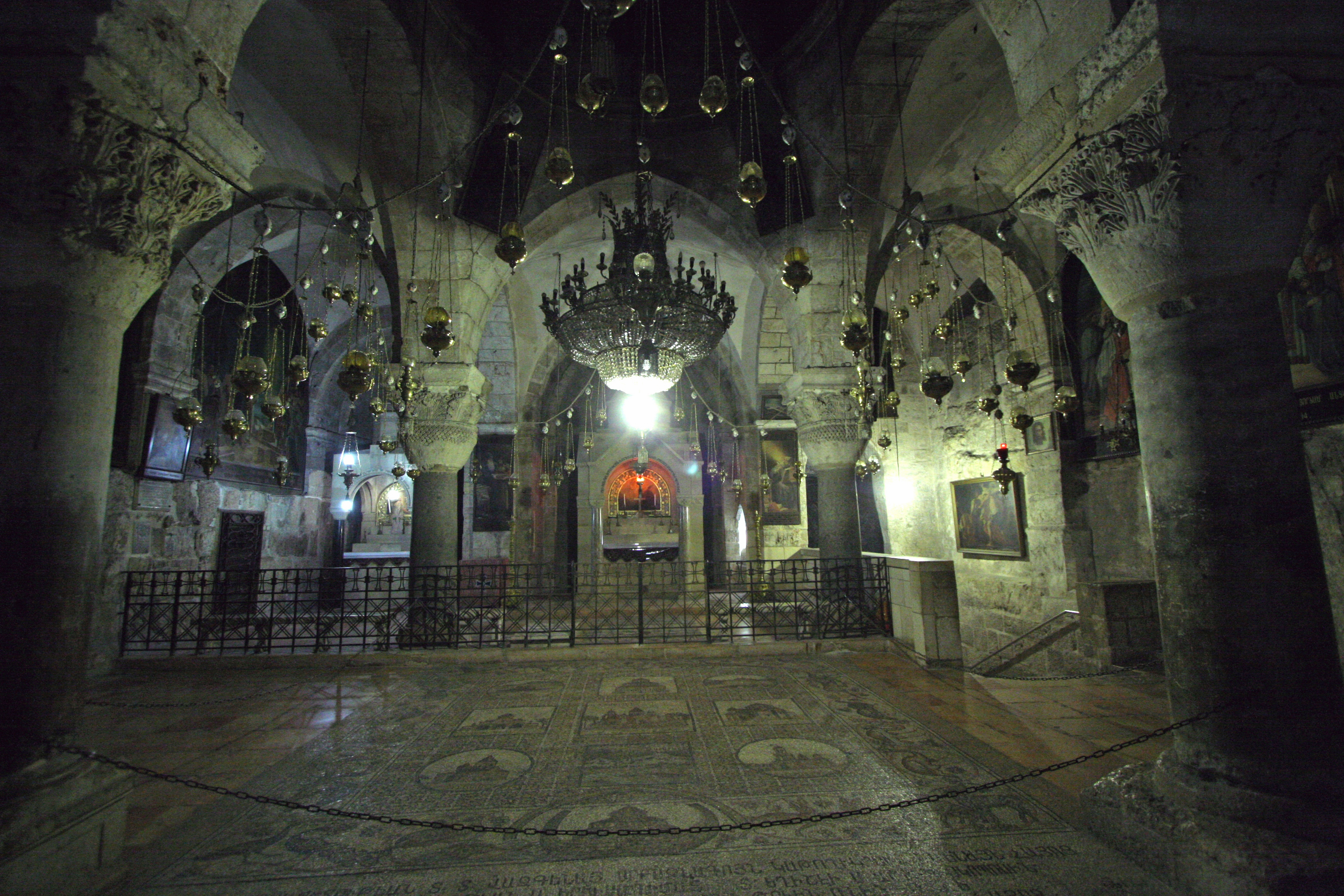
Chapel of Saint Helena

- Chapel of Saint Helena – between the Chapel of the Division of Robes and the Greek Chapel of the Derision are stairs descending to the Chapel of Saint Helena. The Armenians, who own it, call it the Chapel of St. Gregory the Illuminator, after the saint who brought Christianity to the Armenians.

=== Chapel of Saint Vartan ===
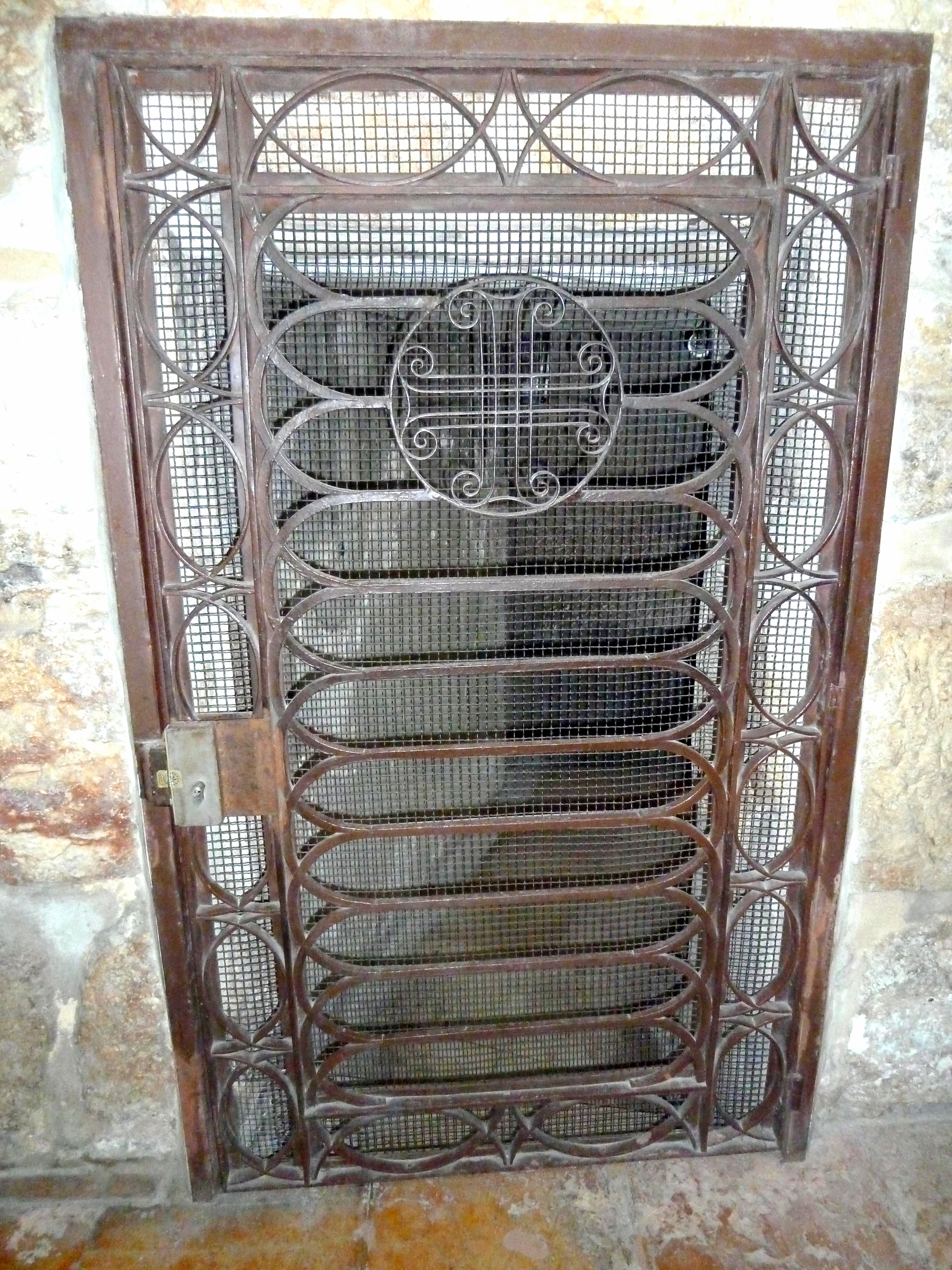
St. Vartan Chapel

- Chapel of St Vartan (or Vardan) Mamikonian – on the north side of the Chapel of Saint Helena is an ornate wrought iron door, beyond which a raised artificial platform affords views of the quarry, and which leads to the Chapel of Saint Vartan. The latter chapel contains archaeological remains from Hadrian's temple and Constantine's basilica. These areas are open only on request.

=== Chapel of the Invention of the Holy Cross ===
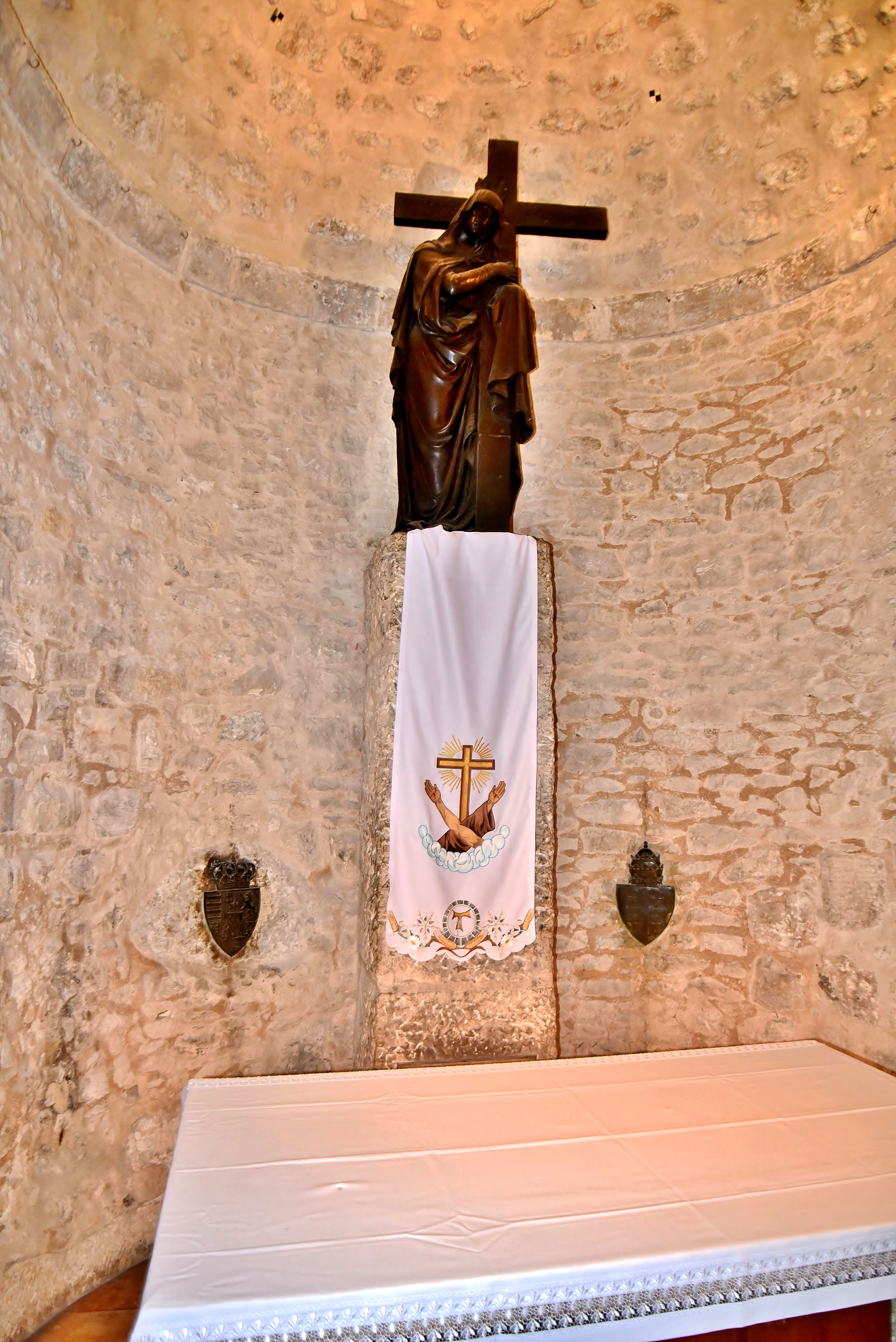
Grotto of the Holy Cross

- Chapel of the Invention of the Cross (named for the Invention (Finding) of the Holy Cross) – another set of 22 stairs from the Chapel of Saint Helena leads down to the Roman Catholic Chapel of the Invention of the Holy Cross, believed to be the place where the True Cross was found.

== Status Quo ==
=== Ottoman decrees ===
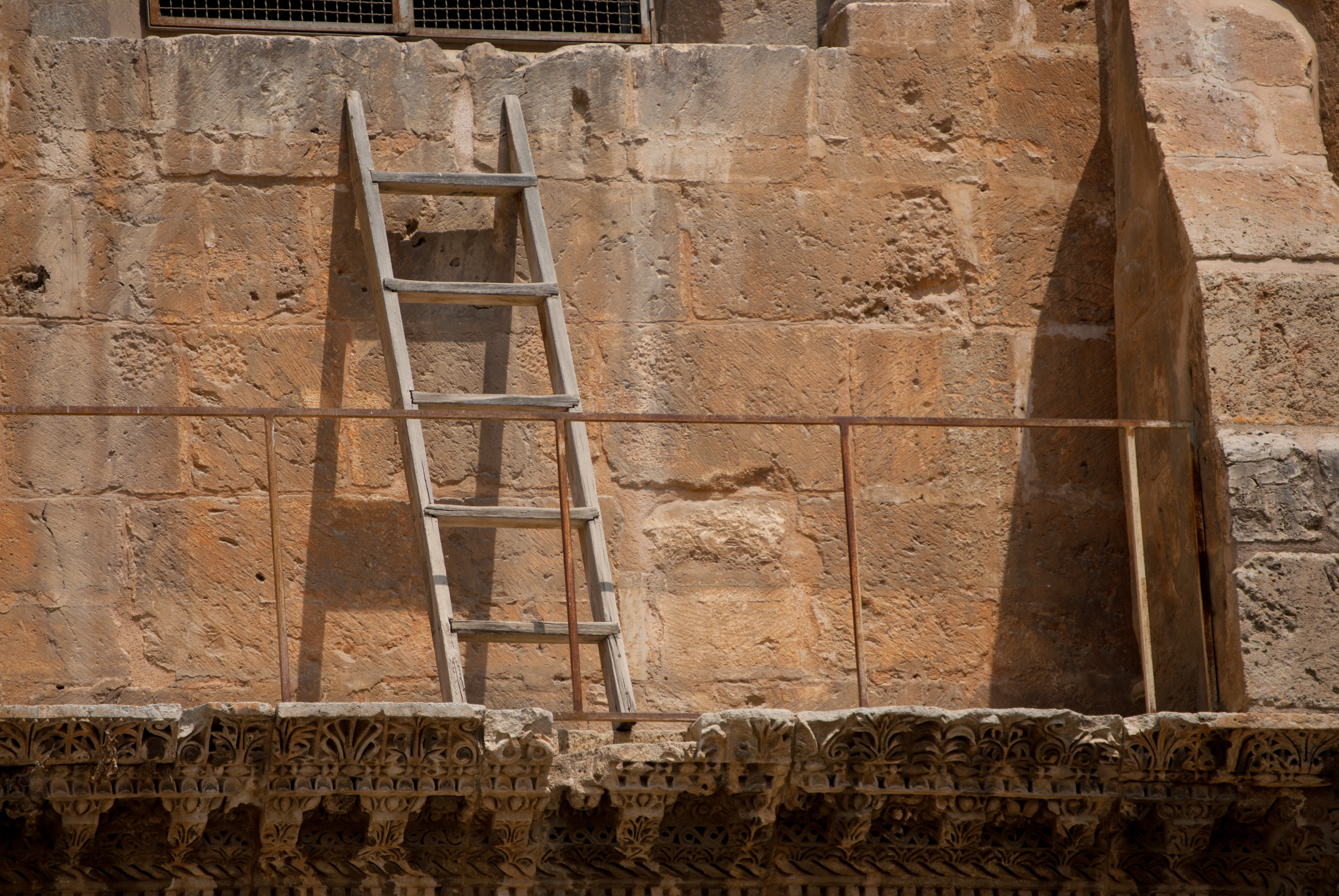
As a result of the Status Quo, the Immovable Ladder placed before 1728 remains in place to this day.

An Ottoman decree of 1757 helped establish a status quo upholding the state of affairs for various Holy Land sites. The status quo was upheld in Sultan Abdülmecid I's firman (decree) of 1852/53, which pinned down the now-permanent statutes of property and the regulations concerning the roles of the different denominations and other custodians.

The primary custodians are the Roman Catholic, Greek Orthodox and Armenian Apostolic churches. The Greek Orthodox act through the Greek Orthodox Patriarchate as well as through the Brotherhood of the Holy Sepulchre. Roman Catholics act through the Franciscan Custody of the Holy Land. In the 19th century, the Coptic Orthodox, the Ethiopian Orthodox and the Syriac Orthodox also acquired lesser responsibilities, which include shrines and other structures in and around the building.

None of these controls the main entrance. In 1192, Saladin assigned door-keeping responsibilities to the Muslim Nusaybah family. The Joudeh al-Goudia (also al-Ghodayya) family were made custodians of the keys to the Holy Sepulchre by Saladin in 1187. Despite occasional disagreements, religious services take place in the Church with regularity and coexistence is generally peaceful. An example of concord between the Church custodians is the full restoration of the Aedicule from 2016 to 2017.

=== Interdenominational issues ===
The establishment of the modern Status Quo in 1853 did not halt controversy and occasional violence. In 1902, 18 friars were hospitalized and some monks were jailed after the Franciscans and Greeks disagreed over who could clean the lowest step of the Chapel of the Franks. In the aftermath, the Greek patriarch, Franciscan custos, Ottoman governor and French consul general signed a convention that both denominations could sweep it. On a hot summer day in 2002, a Coptic monk moved his chair from its agreed spot into the shade. This was interpreted as a hostile move by the Ethiopians, and eleven were hospitalized after the resulting fight. In another incident in 2004, during Orthodox celebrations of the Exaltation of the Holy Cross, a door to the Franciscan Chapel was left open. This was taken as a sign of disrespect by the Orthodox and a fistfight broke out. Some people were arrested, but no one was seriously injured.

On Palm Sunday in April 2008, a brawl broke out when a Greek monk was ejected from the building by a rival faction. Police were called to the scene but were also attacked by the enraged brawlers. On Sunday 9 November 2008, a clash erupted between Armenian and Greek monks during celebrations for the Feast of the Cross.

== Issues with Israeli authorities ==
=== Tax and land disputes ===
In February 2018, the church was closed following a tax dispute over €152,000,000 of uncollected taxes on church properties. The Jerusalem city hall stressed that the Church of the Holy Sepulchre and all other churches are exempt from the taxes, with the changes only affecting establishments like "hotels, halls and businesses" owned by the churches.

There was a lock-in protest against an Israeli legislative proposal which would expropriate church lands that had been sold to private companies since 2010, a measure which church leaders assert constitutes a serious violation of their property rights and the Status Quo. In a joint official statement the church authorities protested what they considered to be the peak of a systematic campaign in:

a discriminatory and racist bill that targets solely the properties of the Christian community in the Holy Land [...] This reminds us all of laws of a similar nature which were enacted against the Jews during dark periods in Europe.

The 2018 taxation affair does not cover any church buildings or religious related facilities (because they are exempt by law), but commercial facilities such as the Notre Dame Hotel which was not paying the municipal property tax, and any land which is owned and used as a commercial land. The church holds the rights to land where private homes have been constructed, and some of the disagreement had been raised after the Knesset had proposed a bill that will make it harder for a private company not to extend a lease for land used by homeowners. The church leaders have said that such a bill will make it harder for them to sell church-owned lands. According to The Jerusalem Post:

The stated aim of the bill is to protect homeowners against the possibility that private companies will not extend their leases of land on which their houses or apartments stand.

=== Land sale to Israeli settlers ===
In 2017, NPR reported that the Greek Orthodox Church owns many properties across Jerusalem, Israel and the West Bank. It owns some 30% of the land in the Old City. But, due to property sales, these properties are diminishing every year. The decision to sell is made by Greek leaders, even though most local followers of the church are Arab Palestinians. The Palestinian Christians have raised concerns about selling these properties to Israeli settler-affiliated organizations.

In June 2019, a number of Christian denominations in Jerusalem raised their voice against the Supreme Court's decision to uphold the sale of three properties by the Greek Orthodox Patriarchate to Ateret Cohanim – an organization that seeks to increase the number of Jews living in the Old City and East Jerusalem. The church leaders warned that if the organization gets to control the sites, Christians could lose access to the Church of the Holy Sepulchre. In June 2022, the Supreme Court upheld the sale and ended the legal battle.

=== Preventing Palm Sunday celebrations ===
On 29 March 2026, the Latin Patriarch, Cardinal Pierbattista Pizzaballa, and the custos of the Holy Land, Fr. Francesco Ielpo, were en route to the Church of the Holy Sepulchre without a procession when Israeli authorities stopped them from entering and thereby preventing the celebration of Palm Sunday. The Patriarchate later released a joint press release calling the incident "a grave precedent" which disrespects the Status Quo.

The dispute stemmed from a safety measure that prohibited all religious gatherings of more than 50 people at Old City holy sites including the Western Wall, Church of the Holy Sepulchre, and the Dome of the Rock. The safety precautions were instituted as a result of a missile strike days earlier due to the ongoing war with Iran.

This event drew criticism from Italian Prime Minister Giorgia Meloni and the Spanish Prime Minister Pedro Sánchez who both called it an attack on religious freedoms, from French President Emmanuel Macron who likewise condemned the move and said it came in the context of "the worrying increase in violations of the status of the Holy Places in Jerusalem", and from U.S. Ambassador to Israel Mike Huckabee who called the incident "an unfortunate overreach already having major repercussions around the world". The Spanish Foreign Affairs Minister Jose Manuel Albares has publicly said that this event "cannot happen again". Both the Italian and Spanish Prime Minister summoned their respective country's Israeli representative to answer for the incident, namely Jonathan Peled and Dana Erlich.

The Israel Police later issued a statement confirming they have approved a limited prayer arrangement at the Church of the Holy Sepulchre in coordination with a representative of the Latin Patriarch. Furthermore, Israeli officials, including Prime Minister Benjamin Netanyahu, later clarified that a small contingent of Catholic leaders should have been allowed to enter the Church despite the safety concerns, and that the barring of their entry was "unfortunate".

== Connection to Roman temple ==
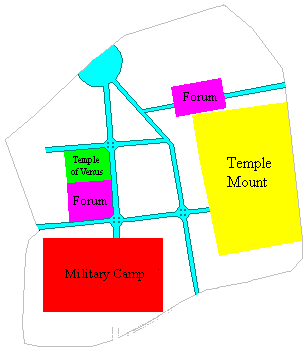
Jerusalem after being rebuilt by Hadrian. Two main east–west roads were built rather than the typical one, due to the awkward location of the Temple Mount, blocking the central east–west route.

The site of the church had been a temple to Jupiter or Venus built by Hadrian before Constantine's edifice was built. Hadrian's temple had been located there because it was the junction of the main north–south road with one of the two main east–west roads and directly adjacent to the forum (now the location of the Muristan, which is smaller than the former forum). The forum itself had been placed, as is traditional in Roman towns, at the junction of the main north–south road with the other main east–west road (which is now El-Bazar/David Street). The temple and forum together took up the entire space between the two main east–west roads (a few above-ground remains of the east end of the temple precinct still survive in the Alexander Nevsky Church complex of the Russian Mission in Exile).

From the archaeological excavations in the 1970s, it is clear that construction took over most of the site of the earlier temple enclosure and that the Triportico and Rotunda roughly overlapped with the temple building itself; the excavations indicate that the temple extended at least as far back as the Aedicule, and the temple enclosure would have reached back slightly further. Virgilio Canio Corbo, a Franciscan priest and archaeologist, who was present at the excavations, estimated from the archaeological evidence that the western retaining wall of the temple itself would have passed extremely close to the east side of the supposed tomb; if the wall had been any further west any tomb would have been crushed under the weight of the wall (which would be immediately above it) if it had not already been destroyed when foundations for the wall were made.

Other archaeologists have criticized Corbo's reconstructions. Dan Bahat, the former city archaeologist of Jerusalem, regards them as unsatisfactory, as there is no known temple of Aphrodite (Venus) matching Corbo's design, and no archaeological evidence for Corbo's suggestion that the temple building was on a platform raised high enough to avoid including anything sited where the Aedicule is now; indeed Bahat notes that many temples to Aphrodite have a rotunda-like design, and argues that there is no archaeological reason to assume that the present rotunda was not based on a rotunda in the temple previously on the site.

== Location ==
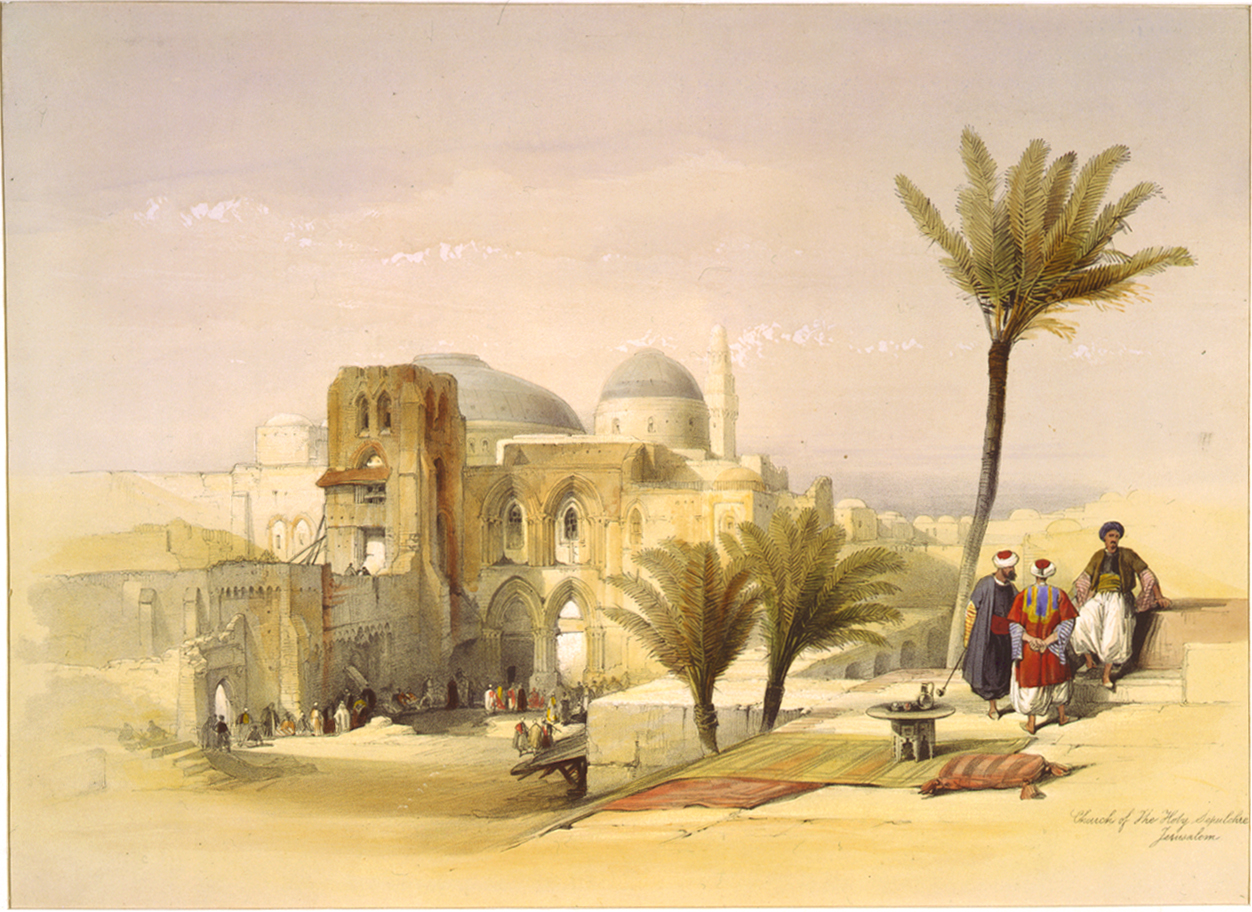
1842 lithograph after David Roberts, in The Holy Land, Syria, Idumea, Arabia, Egypt, and Nubia

The New Testament describes Jesus's tomb as being outside the city wall, (Note: For example, Hebrews 13:12.) as was normal for burials across the ancient world, which were regarded as unclean. (Note: An exception in the Classical World were the Lycians of Anatolia. There are also the Egyptian mortuary-temples, where the object of worship was the deified royal person entombed, but Egyptian temples to the major gods contained no burials.) Today, the site of the Church is within the current walls of the old city of Jerusalem. It has been well documented by archaeologists that in the time of Jesus, the walled city was smaller and the wall then was to the east of the current site of the Church. In other words, the city had been much narrower in Jesus's time, with the site then having been outside the walls; since Herod Agrippa (41–44) is recorded by history as extending the city to the north (beyond the present northern walls), the required repositioning of the western wall is traditionally attributed to him as well.

A recent archeological excavation conducted by Professor Francesca Romana Stasolla, found remains of olive trees and grapevines that are approximately 2,000 years old. These plant remnants, seeds and pollen, were discovered via archaeobotanical analysis performed on soil samples that had been extracted from beneath the stone floor of the church.

The area immediately to the south and east of the sepulchre was a quarry and outside the city during the early first century as excavations under the Lutheran Church of the Redeemer across the street demonstrated.

The church is a part of the UNESCO World Heritage Site Old City of Jerusalem.

The Christian Quarter and the Armenian Quarter are both located in the northwestern and western part of the Old City, due to the fact that the Holy Sepulchre is located close to the northwestern corner of the walled city. The adjacent neighbourhood within the Christian Quarter is called the Muristan, a term derived from the Persian word for hospital, as Christian pilgrim hospices have been maintained in this area near the Holy Sepulchre since at least the time of Charlemagne.

== Influence ==
From the ninth century onward, the construction of churches inspired by the Anastasis was extended across Europe. One example is Santo Stefano in Bologna, Italy, an agglomeration of seven churches recreating shrines of Jerusalem.

Several churches and monasteries in Europe, for instance, in Germany and Russia, and at least one church in the United States have been wholly or partially modelled on the Church of the Resurrection, some even reproducing other holy places for the benefit of pilgrims who could not travel to the Holy Land. They include the Heiliges Grab ("Holy Tomb") of Görlitz, constructed between 1481 and 1504, the New Jerusalem Monastery in Moscow Oblast, constructed by Patriarch Nikon between 1656 and 1666, and Mount St. Sepulchre Franciscan Monastery built by the Franciscans in Washington, D.C. in 1898.

Author Andrew Holt writes that the church was the most important in all Christendom at the time of the Crusades.

== See also ==
- Burial places of founders of world religions
- Canons Regular of the Holy Sepulchre
- Christianity in Israel
- Christianity in Palestine
- Early Christian art and architecture
- Fathers of the Holy Sepulchre
- The Garden Tomb
- Hashemite custodianship of Jerusalem holy sites
- Ancient Roman and Byzantine domes
- High medieval domes
- Symbolism of domes
- List of oldest church buildings
- Monza ampullae
- Mosque of Omar (Jerusalem)
- Rock-cut tombs in ancient Israel
- Talpiot Tomb
- Third Temple
- List of church buildings in Jerusalem
