= List of mosques in Jerusalem =

This is a list of mosques in Jerusalem. It includes mosques in East Jerusalem, Palestine and mosques in West Jerusalem, Israel.

Jerusalem, considered the holiest city for Christians and Jews, was one of the earliest cities conquered by the Muslim Arabs. The Dome of the Rock is the oldest preserved Islamic structure in the world. Today the city still contains several mosques, including the Al-Aqsa mosque which served as the first qibla for about a year.

== List ==
=== Period known ===
Name	Images	Period	Year CE	Location	Remarks
Qibli Mosque (Al-Aqsa Mosque)		Rashidun	637	al-Aqsa Compound, East Jerusalem	The main congregational mosque in the compound, rebuilt by the Umayyads and later the Abbasids and Fatimids
Dome of the Rock		Umayyad	692	al-Aqsa Compound, East Jerusalem	a prayer hall in Al-Aqsa
Al-Buraq Mosque		Ayyubid	903	Western Wall, Haram al-Sharif	It is the interior space of the sealed Barclay's Gate. The date of its conscription is unknown;yet believed to be before 903 CE.
Sultan Ibrahim Ibn Adham Mosque		Ayyubid	336 AH (947/948 CE)	Beit Hanina, East Jerusalem	
Mosque of Omar		Ayyubid	1193	Christian Quarter, Old City	Not open to tourists; accessed for worship only. Its minaret is identical to that of the Al-Khanqah as-Salahiyya Mosque.
Al-Khanqah as-Salahiyya Mosque		Ayyubid	1190s	Christian Quarter, Old City	Established as a khanqah, it was commissioned by Ṣalāḥ ad-Dīn (Saladin). Its minaret is identical to that of the Mosque of Omar.
Nebi Akasha Mosque		Ayyubid	12th century	Straus Street, West Jerusalem	The maqam was completed in the 12th century; and the mosque was completed in the 19th century
Sheikh Jarah Mosque		Ayyubid		Nablus Road, East Jerusalem	Established as Zawiyyah al-Jarrahiyya, a mosque-madrassah by Hussam al-Din al-Jarrahi.
Mosque of Al-Qala'a		Ayyubid		Jerusalem Citadel	Established during the Mamluk era, and later on renovated several times. No longer functional as a mosque, the building was converted to a museum.
Magharba Mosque		Ayyubid			Located in the south-western corner. No longer functional as a mosque, the building was converted to a museum.
Al Dissi Mosque		Ayyubid	1218–1227	Armenian and Jewish Quarter boundary, Old City	
Al-Qaymariyya Mosque		Mamluk	13th century	Christian Quarter, Old City	Most likely completed during the Mamluk era; however, some reports claim it was built during the Ottoman era.
Sidna Omar Mosque		Mamluk	Late 14th century	Jewish Quarter, Old City	Closed following the Six-Day War of 1967
Sheikh Loulou Mosque		Mamluk		North-western part of the Old City	The small mosque was named in honour of Sultan Emir Badr al-Din Loulou.
Mosque of Khan al-Sultan		Mamluk			Named in honour of Sultan Barquq
al-Maulawiya Mosque		Ottoman			An older mosque transformed by the Crusaders into the Church of St Agnes and reverted to a mosque after their defeat.
Masjid Swiqat 'Allun		Ottoman		Swaikit 'Allun market, close to Bab al-Khalil	A small mosque.
Abdeen Mosque		Modern	1939	Wadi al-Joz, East Jerusalem	It was built by brothers Abdel Muhsin and Omar Abdeen.
Marwani Mosque		Modern	1996	al-Aqsa Compound, East Jerusalem	located in an underground area in the south-eastern corner of the compound it was built as a land leveling area for Al-Aqsa, and became known as Solomon's Stables, during the crusades

=== Period unknown ===
Name	Remarks
Afghani mosque	
Mosque of Bab Al-Ghawanma	
Mosque of Bab Hattah	
Bazar mosque	
Mosque of Dar al-Imam	
Mosque of David the Prophet	
Mosque of Dome of Moses	
Mosque of Al-Elmi	
Mosque of Al-Hanablah	
Haret el-Arman mosque	
Haret el-Nasari Mosque	
Hayat Mosque	A small mosque, 4 square metres (43 sq ft)
Hejazi mosque	
Al-Karemi mosque	
Khaldeya mosque	
Mosque of Khan Al-Zeit	
Masoudi mosque	
Mathana mosque	
Al-Qormee Mosque	
Mosque of Raba'a Al-Adaweya	
Red Minerat mosque	Also known as the Masjid Sheikh Rehan.
Shorbaje mosque	Established as a Sebil Waqf (charitable fountain) for water dispensation, it was later on decommissioned with its original function when the city started to get its water from the city water mains. A small mosque was established on the premises.
Mosque of Suleyman al-Farsi	
Mosque of Suleyman's throne	
Mosque of Al-Tur	
Yacoubiya mosque	
