= Gerard Sasso =

Founder of the Knights Hospitaller

Blessed Gerard
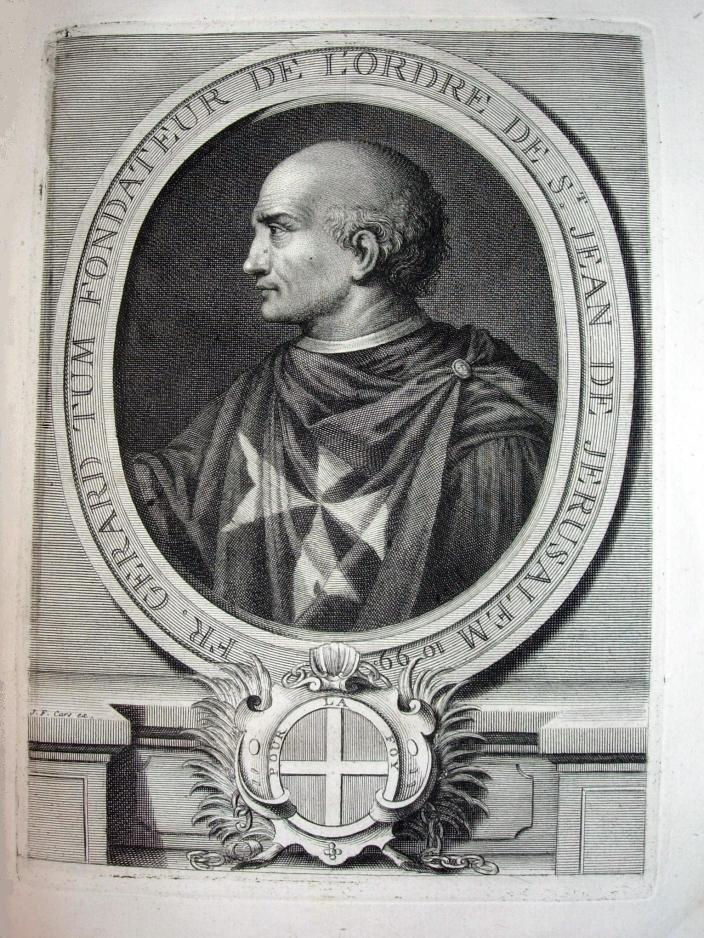

Rector of the Hospital
- Born: c. 1040; Scala, Duchy of Amalfi
- Died: 3 September 1120; Jerusalem, Kingdom of Jerusalem
- Venerated in: Catholic Church
- Major shrine: Monastery of St. Ursula, Valletta, Malta
- Feast: October 13
- Patronage: Day of Emergency Medicine (Poland)

Gerardo Sasso (c. 1040 – 3 September 1120), also known as Blessed Gérard, was an Italian lay brother in the Benedictine Order in the Catholic Church who was appointed as rector of the hospice in Jerusalem at Muristan in 1080. In the wake of the success of the First Crusade in 1099, he became the founder of the Order of St John of Jerusalem, also known as the Knights Hospitaller, an organization that received papal recognition in 1113. As such, he was the first Grand Master of the Knights Hospitaller.

== Name ==
Gerard Sasso became known as Pierre-Gérard de Martigues due to a mistaken tradition of his place of birth being Martigues, in Provence. However, William of Tyre, writing in the late 12th century, cites Amalfi as Gerard's birthplace. This is not implausible, as merchants from Amalfi were involved in the reconstruction of the hospice in Jerusalem in the 1020s after its destruction in 1005 under caliph al-Hakim bi-Amr Allah.

An alleged surname Tum, variously also Thom, Tune or Tenque, is due to an error by Pierre-Joseph de Haitze (1730), who mistook the word tunc, "then", as a name of Gerard. De Haitze's mistake was identified in 1885 by Ferdinand de Hellwald. Before the erroneous nature of the surname Tunc became clear, Italian historian Francesco Galeani Napione (d. 1830) Italianized Gerardus Tunc as Gerardo da Tonco, suggesting that he was a native of (or held possessions in) Tonco in Piedmont.

== Life ==
Little is known about Gerard's life. His nationality and place of birth is unknown, but many historians claim that he was born in Scala, Campania, around 1040, while tradition makes him a native of either Amalfi or Lower Burgundy (Provence). His name, Gerard, was unknown in southern Italy in the mid-11th century.

He most likely was a Benedictine lay brother, possibly one of the frates conversi (i.e., men who joined the order not as boys or youths but after spending part of their adult years leading a secular life) who came to the Holy Land to serve at the abbey of St. Mary of the Latins. Around 1080, the abbot put him in charge of the Hospital of St. John in Jerusalem, which had been built on the site of the Monastery of Saint John the Baptist in the 1060s in addition to the older hospice rebuilt in the 1020s.

Prior to the Siege of Jerusalem of 1099, much of the Christian population had been expelled from Jerusalem by the Fatimids to prevent collusion with the Western besiegers. Following the capture of the city by the Crusaders the Eastern Christians were gradually returned. Gerard remained behind with some fellow serving brothers to tend to the sick in the hospital.

After the success of the First Crusade and the establishment of the Kingdom of Jerusalem, Gerard continued his work at the hospital, now under vastly more beneficent conditions. Godfrey of Bouillon, the first Latin ruler of Jerusalem, gave some property to the hospital, and his successor Baldwin I of Jerusalem granted it one-tenth of the spoils of a victory at the Battle of Ramla in 1101. Also in 1101, Roger Borsa, Duke of Apulia, gave a gift of 1000 bezants to Dagobert of Pisa, Latin Patriarch of Jerusalem, with the specification that one third of the gift was to go to the hospital. The patriarch unfortunately kept the gift for himself, contributing to his downfall.

By 1113, the hospital was a wealthy and powerful organisation within the kingdom of Jerusalem, and Gerard expanded its operations far beyond the limits of the city, establishing daughter hospitals at Bari, Otranto, Taranto, Messina, Pisa, Asti and Saint-Gilles, placed strategically along the pilgrim route to Jerusalem.

The hospital soon overshadowed the abbey of St. Mary of the Latins, which was still its nominal parent organisation, and it may be that because of this, it was deemed appropriate to establish the hospital as a sovereign entity in its own right. This happened in 1113, when Pope Paschal II in Pie Postulatio Voluntatis recognised the hospital as a new religious order. The brothers serving in the hospital were now known as the Hospitallers of St John, and Gerard as the Rector of the Hospital. The Order adopted a rule that adopted components from the Rule of St Benedict and the Rule of St Augustine. The order was now independent, subject only to the papacy (and no longer subject to the Patriarchate of Jerusalem), and free to elect Gerard's successor, and free to receive and own property.

Gerard lived for another seven years. He died in his seventies on 3 September, between 1118 and 1121. He was succeeded by Raymond du Puy.

== Legacy and veneration ==
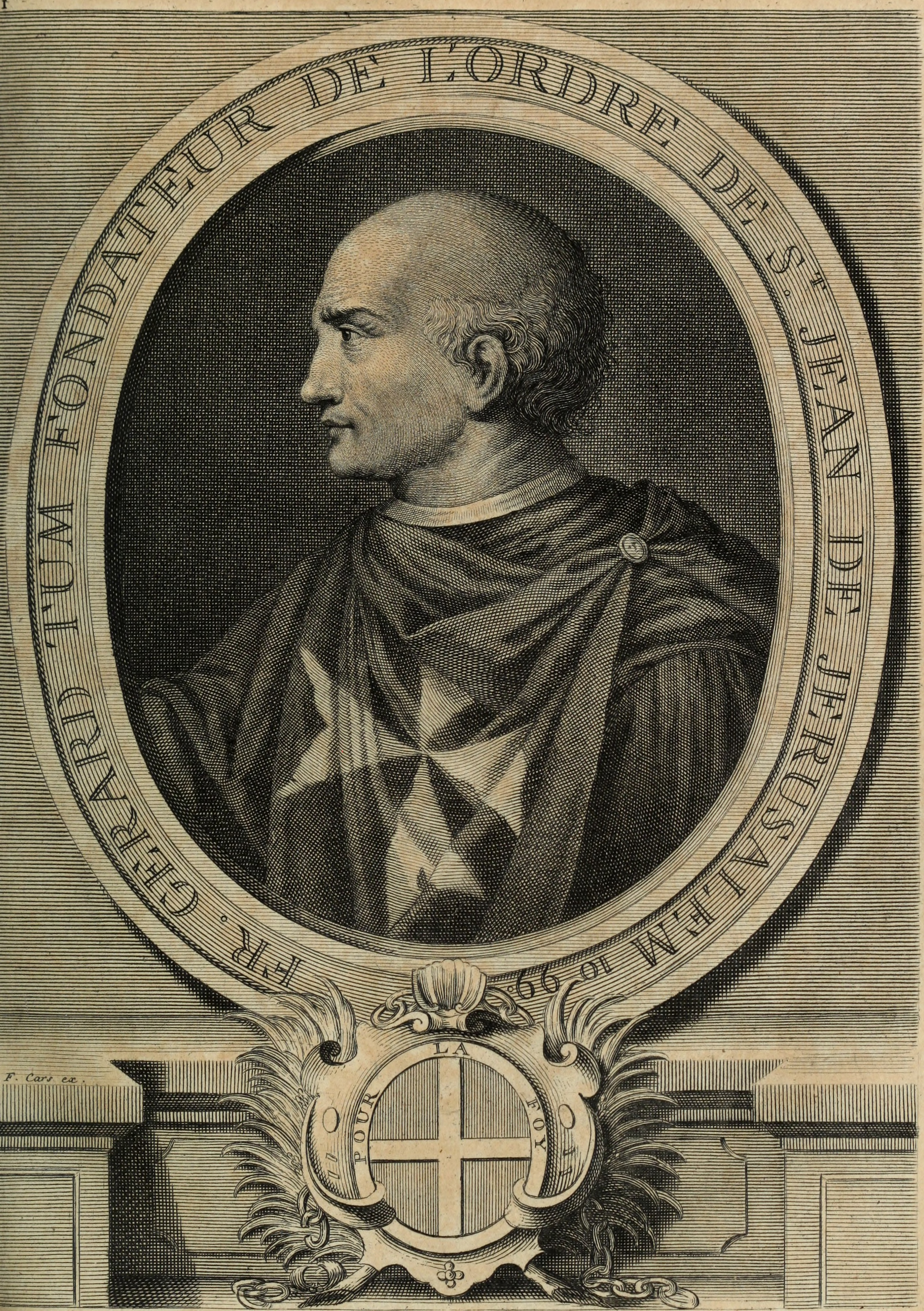
18th-century copper engraving by Laurent Cars, captioned Brother Gerard Tum, Founder of the Order of St John of Jerusalem 1099.

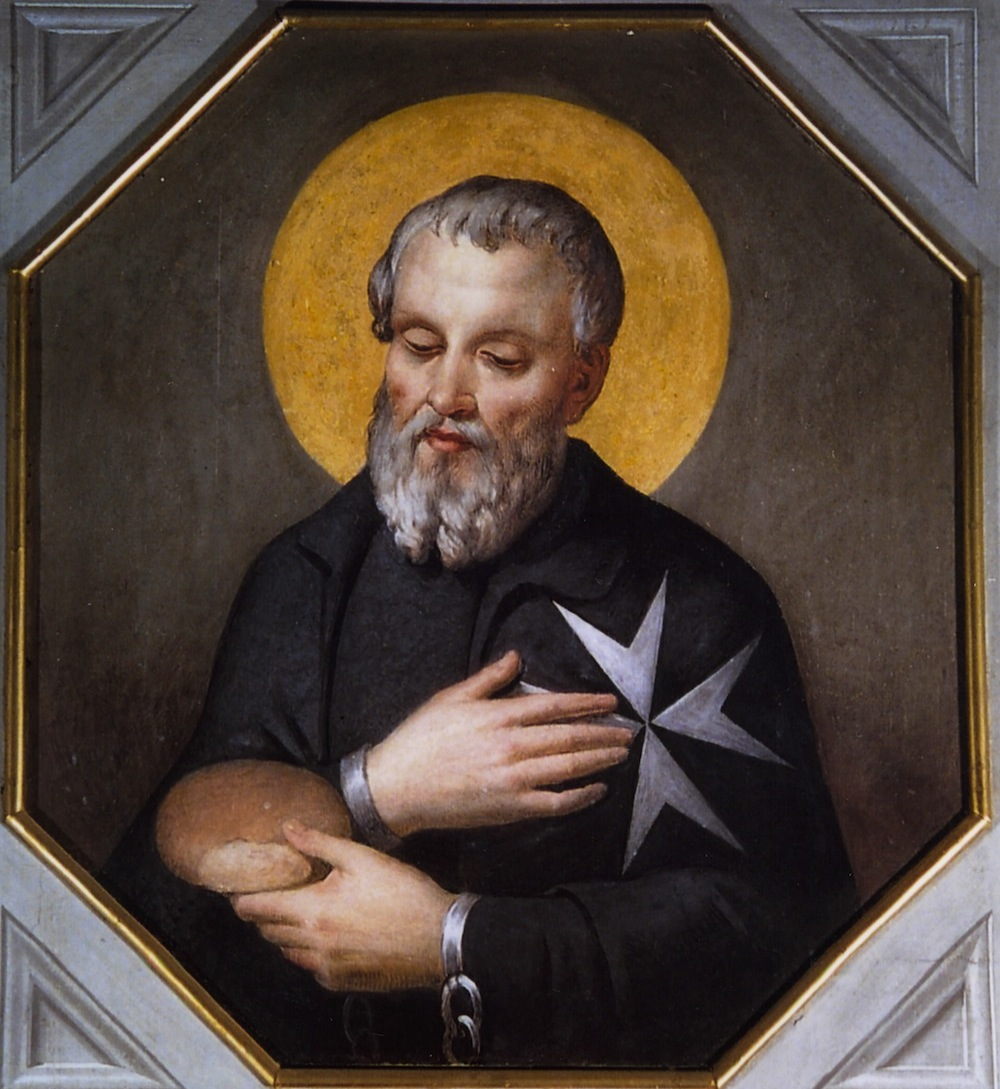
A 17th-century painting of Gerard at a chapel in Rome

The order continued to flourish under Raymond, who first used the title of Grand Master after Roger II of Sicily used this address in letters to Raymond. It was also Raymond who militarised the order. According to descriptions of the operations of hospital from the second half of the 12th century, the men's hospital was divided into eleven wards and could tend to more than 1,000 patients. The hospital admitted all sick, regardless of nationality or religion. The Hospitallers at this time also operated a field hospital that would accompany the crusader armies on expeditions, which was able to evacuate 750 seriously wounded men from the Battle of Montgisard on 25 November 1177 for treatment in Jerusalem. The Hospitallers referred to their patients as "our lords, the sick" in a tradition that presumably originated with Gerard.

Legends about the life of Gerard are recorded in the 13th century, especially addressing his fate during the siege of Jerusalem. According to these accounts, Gerard would hide bread within the folds of his cloak to feed the hungry Crusaders outside the city walls. When the Muslim rulers discovered Gerard they miraculously only found stones within his cloak. According to other versions, the Muslims believed that Gerard was hoarding money and not paying the proper taxes, and he was arrested and tortured, leaving him crippled for the rest of his life.

The veneration of Gerard focussed on his humility and faith to such an extent as to eclipse the capabilities as a leader and organiser he clearly possessed. Favoured by historical circumstances, Gerard took advantage of his position as lay administrator of a monastery hospital to found the first truly international religious order. Both his saintliness and his ability are expressed in a legend, recorded in an interpolation in a manuscript of the Historia of Fulcher of Chartres and as such of uncertain authenticity, as follows:

Here lies Gerard, the humblest man in the East, the slave (servus) of the poor, hospitable to strangers, meek of countenance but with a noble heart. One can see in these walls how good he was. He was provident and active. Exerting himself in all sorts of ways, he stretched forth his arms into many lands to obtain what he needed to feed his own. On the seventeenth day of the passage of the sun under the sign of Virgo [3 September], he was carried into heaven by the hands of angels.

After his death, the Hospitallers tried to preserve Gerard's body and it was kept in the monastery in Jerusalem and later moved to Acre after the fall of the city. When the situation in the Holy Land became precarious, his body was moved to the West. By 1283, his body was contained in a "very precious silver gilt box with many precious stones" in the Hospitaller chapel in Manosque, Provence. His skull was transferred to Monasterio Santa Ursula in Valletta, Malta, in 1749 while the remainder of his relics were destroyed or scattered in the French Revolution. Relics attributed to Gerard continue to be preserved in Provençal churches, including the church of Martigues, one of his possible birthplaces. Other relics belonging to Gerard can be found in Martigues, France, in the chapel of the Magistral Palace of the order in Rome, in the church of San Domenico, Pisa and in Sicily.

A stained glass window in the Church of St John of Jerusalem in Hackney features Gerard with the caption Gerard : 1st Grand Master.

== See also ==
- Cartulaire général de l'Ordre des Hospitaliers
- List of Knights Hospitaller sites
- Langue (Knights Hospitaller)
- Flags of the Knights Hospitaller

== Bibliography ==
- Asbridge, Thomas (2012). The Crusades: The War for the Holy Land. Simon & Schuster. ISBN 978-1-84983-688-3.
- Barker, Ernest (1923). The Crusades. World's manuals. Oxford University Press, London.
- Beltjens, Alain (1995). Aux origines de l'ordre de Malte: de la fondation de l'Hôpital de Jérusalem à sa transformation en ordre militaire. A. Beltjens. ISBN 978-2960009200.
- Boas, Adrian J. (2009). Jerusalem in the Time of the Crusades: Society, Landscape and Art in the Holy City Under Frankish Rule. Routledge. ISBN 9780415230001.
- Delaville Le Roulx, Joseph (1895). Inventaire des pièces de Terre-Sainte de l'ordre de l'Hôpital. Revue de l'Orient Latin, Tome III. pp. 12 v.
- Delaville Le Roulx, Joseph (1904). Les Hospitaliers en Terre Sainte et à Chypre (1100-1310). E. Leroux, Paris.
- Demurger, Alain (2013). Les Hospitaliers, De Jérusalem à Rhodes 1050-1317. Tallandier, Paris. ISBN 979-1021000605.
- Flavigny, Bertrand Galimard (2006). Histoire de l'ordre de Malte. Perrin, Paris. ISBN 978-2262021153.
- Harot, Eugène (1911). Essai d'armorial des grands maîtres de l'Ordre de Saint-Jean de Jérusalem. Collegio araldico.
- Josserand, Philippe (2009). Prier et combattre, Dictionnaire européen des ordres militaires au Moyen Âge. Fayard, Paris. ISBN 978-2213627205.
- Lock, Peter (2006). The Routledge Companion to the Crusades. Routledge. doi:10.4324/9780203389638. ISBN 0-415-39312-4.
- Murray, Alan V. (2006). The Crusades—An Encyclopedia. ABC-CLIO. ISBN 978-1-57607-862-4.
- Nicholson, Helen J. (2001). The Knights Hospitaller. Boydell & Brewer. ISBN 978-1843830382.
- Pringle, Denys (2010). The Churches of the Crusader Kingdom of Jerusalem: Volume 3, The City of Jerusalem: A Corpus. Cambridge University Press. ISBN 978-0521172837.
- Riley-Smith, Jonathan (2012). The Knights Hospitaller in the Levant, c. 1070-1309. Palgrave Macmillan. ISBN 978-0-230-29083-9.
- Runciman, Steven (1951). A History of the Crusades, Volume One: The First Crusade and the Foundation of the Kingdom of Jerusalem. Cambridge University Press. ISBN 9780521347709.
- Runciman, Steven (1952). A History of the Crusades, Volume Two: The Kingdom of Jerusalem and the Frankish East, 1100-1187. Cambridge University Press. ISBN 9780521347716.
- Setton, Kenneth M. (1969). A History of the Crusades. Six Volumes. University of Wisconsin Press.
- Tyerman, Christopher (2006). God's War: A New History of the Crusades. Belknap Press. ISBN 978-0-674-02387-1.
- Vann, Theresa M. (2006). Order of the Hospital. The Crusades––An Encyclopedia, pp. 598–605.

Preceded by New creation	Grand Master of the Knights Hospitaller; 1113–1120	Succeeded by Raymond du Puy
