= Al-Qaymariyya Mosque =

Mosque in the Old City of Jerusalem

Coordinates: 31°46′44.735″N 35°13′33.694″E

- Location of the mosque in the Old City of Jerusalem

Religion
- Affiliation: Islam
- Branch/tradition: Sunni
- District: Jerusalem District
- Ecclesiastical or organisational status: Mosque
- Status: Active

Location
- Location: Christian Quarter, Old City of Jerusalem
- Interactive map of Al-Qaymariyya Mosque

Architecture
- Completed: 13th century

Specifications
- Interior area: 48 m^{2} (520 sq ft)
- Dome: One
- Dome height (outer): 50 m (160 ft)

The Al-Qaymariyya Mosque, also known as the Al-Sitt Qamrah Mosque, is a mosque, located in the Christian Quarter of the Old City of Jerusalem. It is located specifically to the right of those entering from Bab Al-Jadid. The exact date of the building is unclear; reported from the 13th century, during the Mamluk era, or from the Ottoman era.

== Description ==
The mosque has a simple entrance leading to an open courtyard, in the western part of which there is a square-shaped prayer hall, topped by a shallow dome approximately 50 metres (160 ft) high. The dome rests on an octagonal base consisting of the four original corners of the prayer hall and four arched corners, each of which is erected on a wall. There is a mihrab in the middle of the southern facade of the prayer hall, which is a niche hollowed out inside the wall. As for the southern part of the open courtyard, there is a small room that contains a shrine. The total area of the mosque is 48 square metres (520 sq ft).

== History ==
The report broadcast by Al-Ghad Channel stated that the construction dates from the thirteenth century CE, indicating that the building inside the mosque dates from the Mamluk period, as it was built in the style of four Mamluk columns that support a dome above them.

Documents from the Islamic Heritage Revival and Research Foundation contain references to the mosque's affairs and staff, and its use as a prayer hall until 1948, when Zionist militias inflicted significant damage on it during the Nakba. In 1950, the Jerusalem Municipality, in coordination with the Jerusalem Endowments Administration, began to rebuild the destroyed parts. The reconstruction process continued after the June 1967 war, when the military fortifications opposite it were removed. The municipality then handed it over to the Jerusalem Endowments, which requested that electricity be reconnected to it in 1973. It also reclaimed an 80-square-metre (860 sq ft) plot of land adjacent to the mosque and annexed it to the mosque in 1987. Three years later, the Jerusalem Endowments Department carried out comprehensive renovations.

In 1992, the Al-Aqsa Mosque Charitable Society requested the use of the land belonging to the mosque and its annexes to establish a madrasa, a library and to hold religious classes. The Al-Huda School was established to teach children up to the age of twelve years.

== Etymology ==
The mosque is named in honour of the mujahid princes who died in Jerusalem and were buried in the Qaymariyah Dome, including:

- Prince Hussam al-Din Abu al-Hasan ibn Abi al-Fawaris al-Qaymiri, who died in 648 AH (1250/1251 CE)
- Prince Diaa al-Din Musa ibn Abi al-Fawaris, who died in 661 AH (1262/1263 CE)
- Prince Nasser al-Din bin Hassan al-Qaymiri, who died in 665 AH (1266/1267 CE)
- Prince Nasser al-Din Muhammad Jabir Bey, one of the princes of the Tabalkhana in the Levant and the supervisor of the Two Holy Mosques in Jerusalem and Hebron, who died in 776 AH (1374/1375 CE).

Archaeologist Ahmed Taha stated that the mosque is related to the Dome of the Rock, which is located near the shrine of Sayyidna Akasha, located to the west of the walls of Jerusalem. He also believes that its origin may have been a corner that included the mosque and the shrine of its founder.

== See also ==
- List of mosques in Jerusalem
- Islam in Palestine
