= Hayat Mosque =

Mosque in Jerusalem

- مسجد الحيات
- Location of the mosque in the Old City of Jerusalem

Religion
- Affiliation: Islam
- Branch/tradition: Sunni
- Ecclesiastical or organizational status: Mosque
- Status: Active

Location
- Location: Christian Quarter, Old City of Jerusalem
- Interactive map of Hayat Mosque
- Coordinates: 31°46′40″N 35°13′48″E

Specifications
- Length: 4 m (13 ft)
- Width: 4 m (13 ft)

The Hayat Mosque (Arabic: مسجد الحيات) is a small mosque located in the Christian Quarter, within the walls of the Old City of Jerusalem. It is one of the ancient mosques of the city, attributed to the Caliph Omar ibn al-Khattab. This mosque holds particular significance as it is situated next to the Church of the Holy Sepulchre to the east and is surrounded by shops. Its dimensions are 4 by 4 metres (13 by 13 ft). It is named "Hayat," which is the Arabic plural of "snake," because, according to popular belief, it contains a talisman that is believed to neutralize the venom of the snakes that roam in Jerusalem and whose bites are potentially lethal.

== See also ==
- List of mosques in Jerusalem
- List of mosques in Palestine
- Islam in Palestine
