= Al-Khanqah as-Salahiyya Mosque =

Mosque in Jerusalem

- مسجد الخانقاه الصلاحية
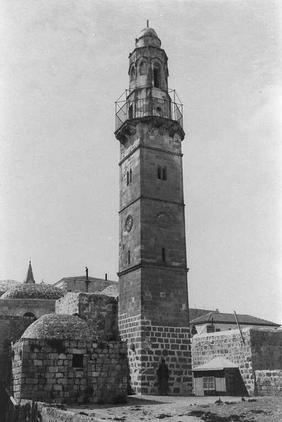
- The mosque during the Ottoman period

- Location of the mosque in the Old City of Jerusalem

Religion
- Affiliation: Islam
- Branch/tradition: Sunni
- Ecclesiastical or organisational status: Mosque and khanqah
- Status: Active

Location
- Location: Christian Quarter, Old City, Jerusalem
- Interactive map of Al-Khanqah as-Salahiyya Mosque
- Coordinates: 31°46′43.68″N 35°13′45.53″E

Architecture
- Style: Ayyubid, Ottoman
- Founder: Ṣalāḥ ad-Dīn (Saladin)
- Completed: 1190s CE (khanqah); 1417 CE (minaret)

Specifications
- Dome: 2 (maybe more)
- Minaret: 1

The Al-Khanqah as-Salahiyya Mosque (Arabic: مسجد الخانقاه الصلاحية, romanized: al-Khānqāh aṣ-Ṣalāḥiyya, lit. 'the lodge of Saladin') is a mosque complex, located in the Christian Quarter of the Old City of Jerusalem, north of the Church of the Holy Sepulchre. It was named after Saladin, who endowed it. As the name indicates, the complex was originally a khanqah, a place for gatherings of Sufi Islamic adherents, including dervishes. The complex today comprises the mosque as well as a school, a public sitting room, rooms for military officers, a dining room for wayfarers, small rooms for guards, and a very small room for Saladin’s spiritual retreat.

== History ==
The building is situated on the former palace of the Latin Patriarch of Jerusalem.

Following the Crusader surrender of Jerusalem to Ṣalāḥ ad-Dīn (Saladin) in 1187, it became al-Khānqāh aṣ-Ṣalāḥiyya. The building comprised a mosque, a school, a public sitting room, rooms for military officers, a dining room for wayfarers, and small rooms originally for guards, as well as a very small room for Salah ad-Din (Saladin)'s spiritual retreat. As the name indicates, it has also been a khanqah, a convent of Sufi adherents.

The minaret was built in 1417, during the Mamluk period. The minaret is almost identical to that of the Mosque of Omar, located on the other side of the Church of the Holy Sepulchre. The two minarets were obviously designed as a pair; a line connecting the two minarets would intersect the door of the Tomb of Jesus inside the church, and the minarets are equidistant to that door with their tops at exactly the same elevation despite starting at different ground levels.

== Gallery ==
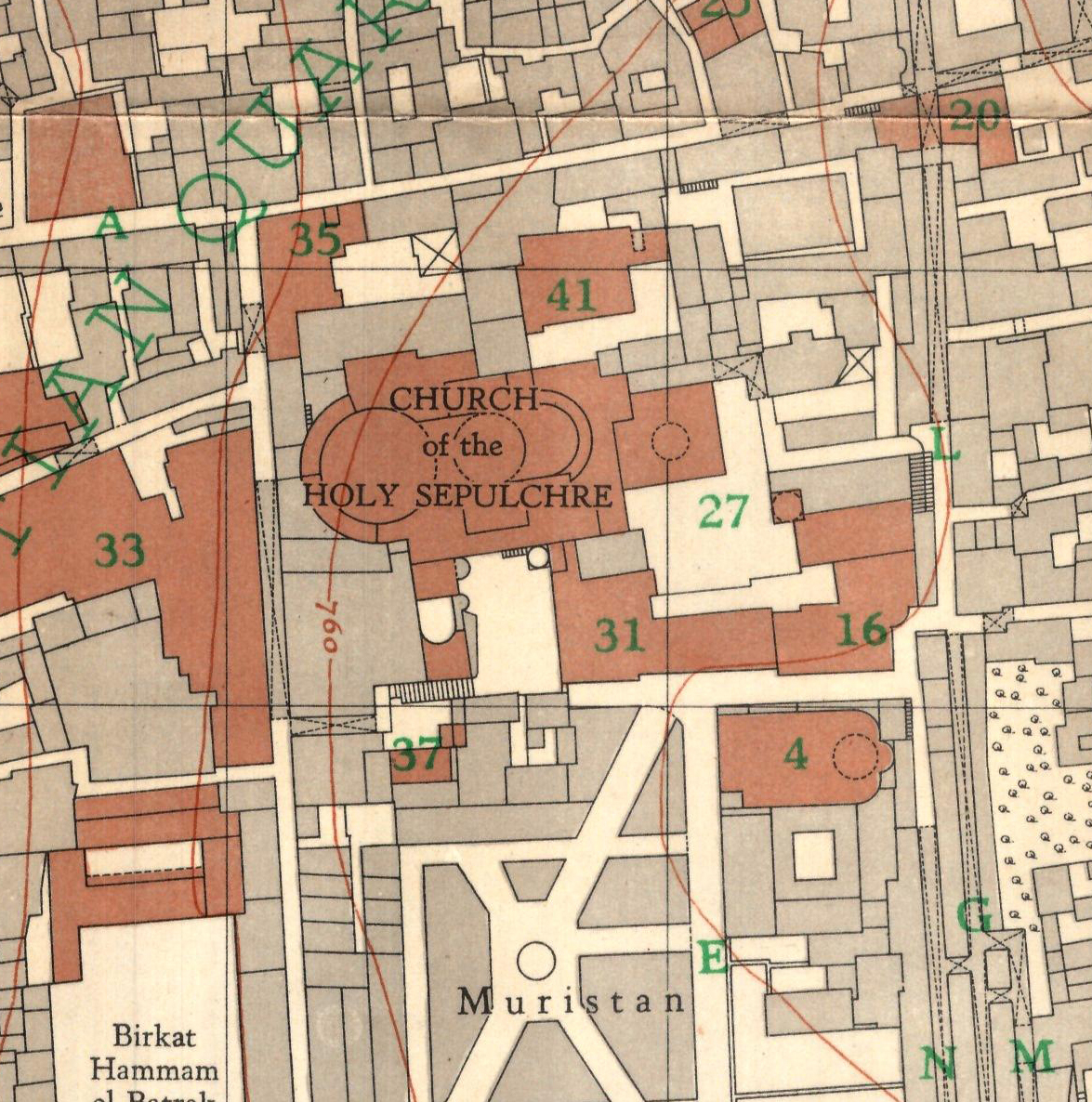
The 1936 Survey of Palestine map – the Khanqa mosque is number 35

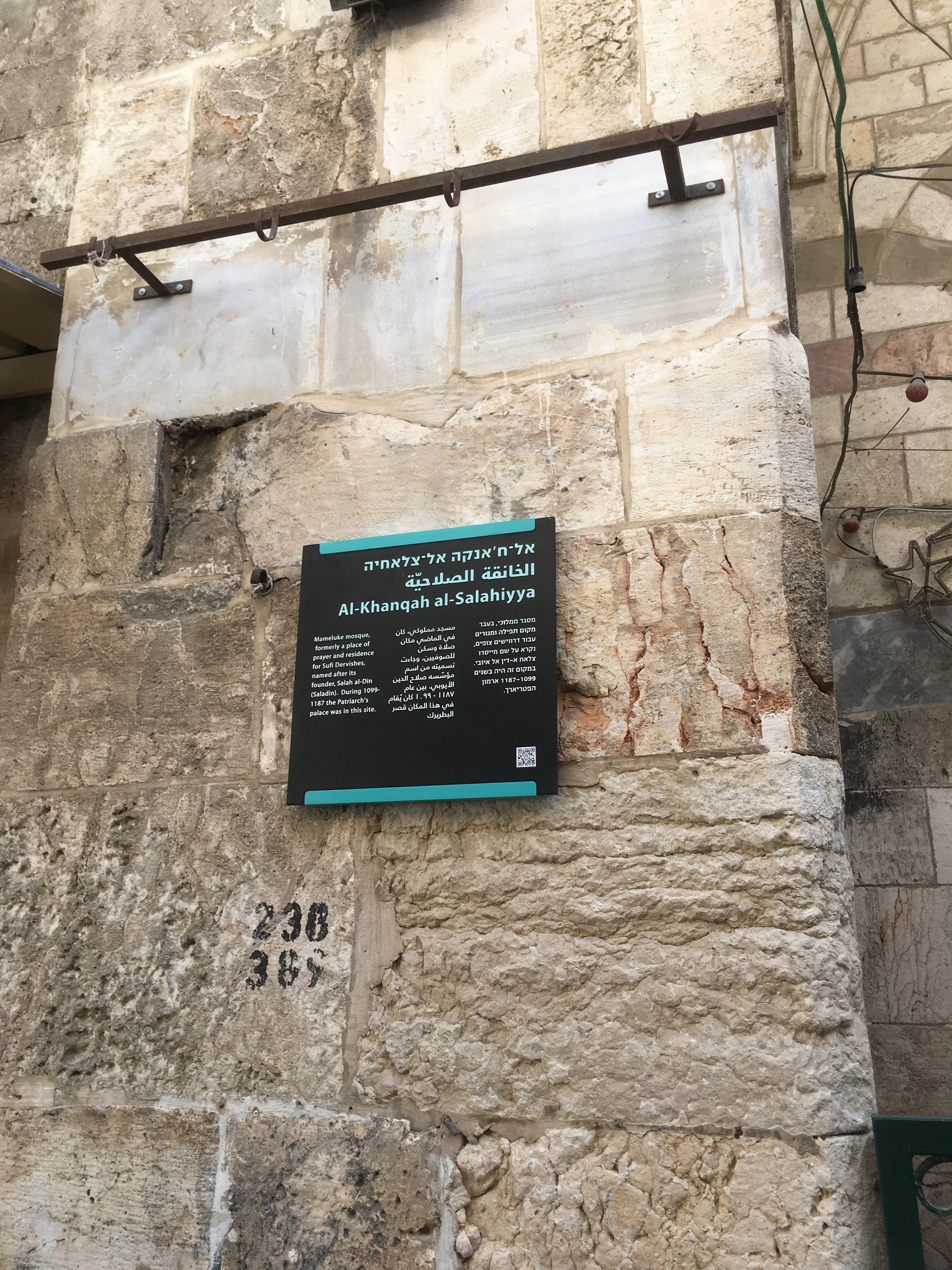

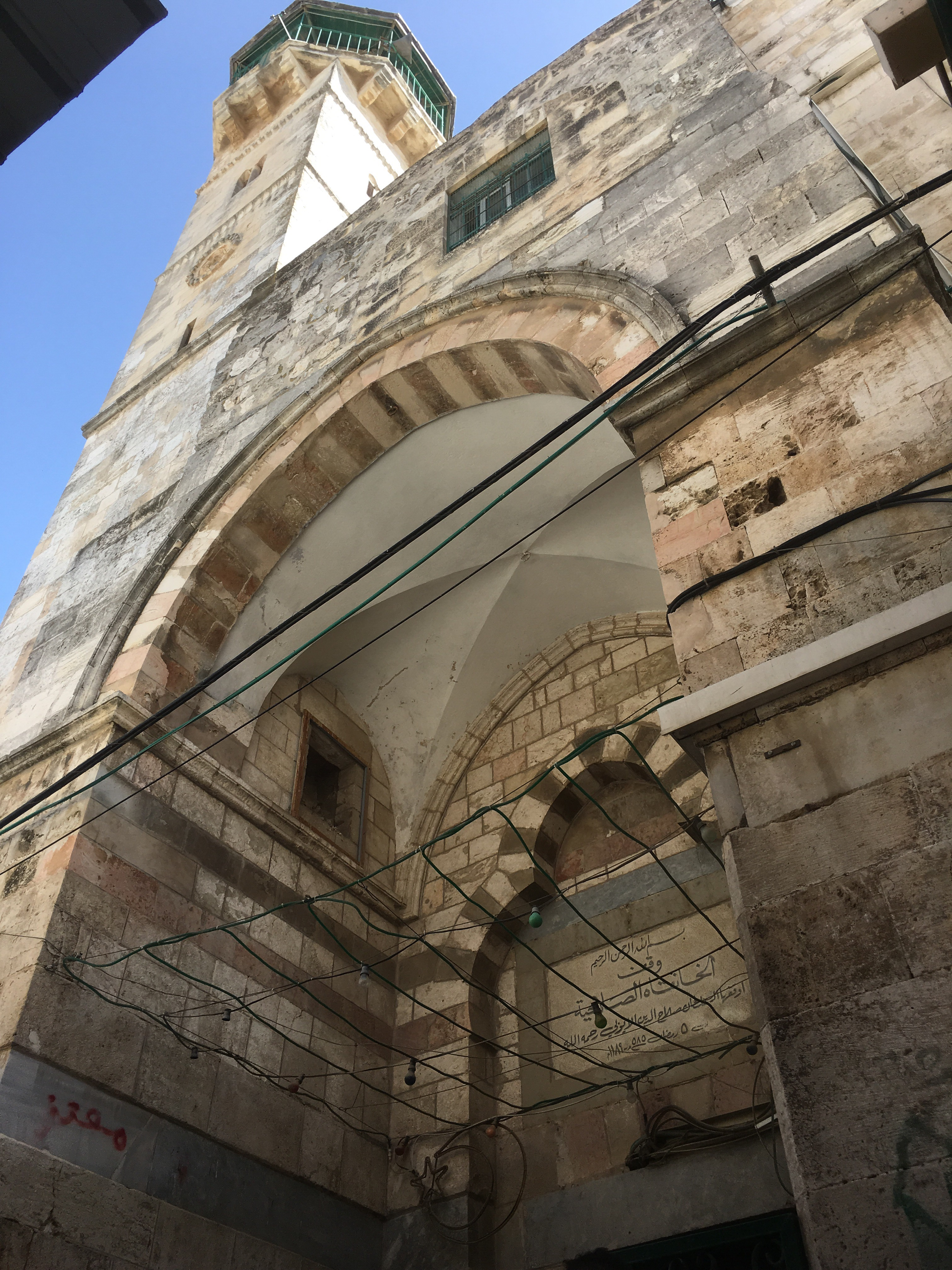

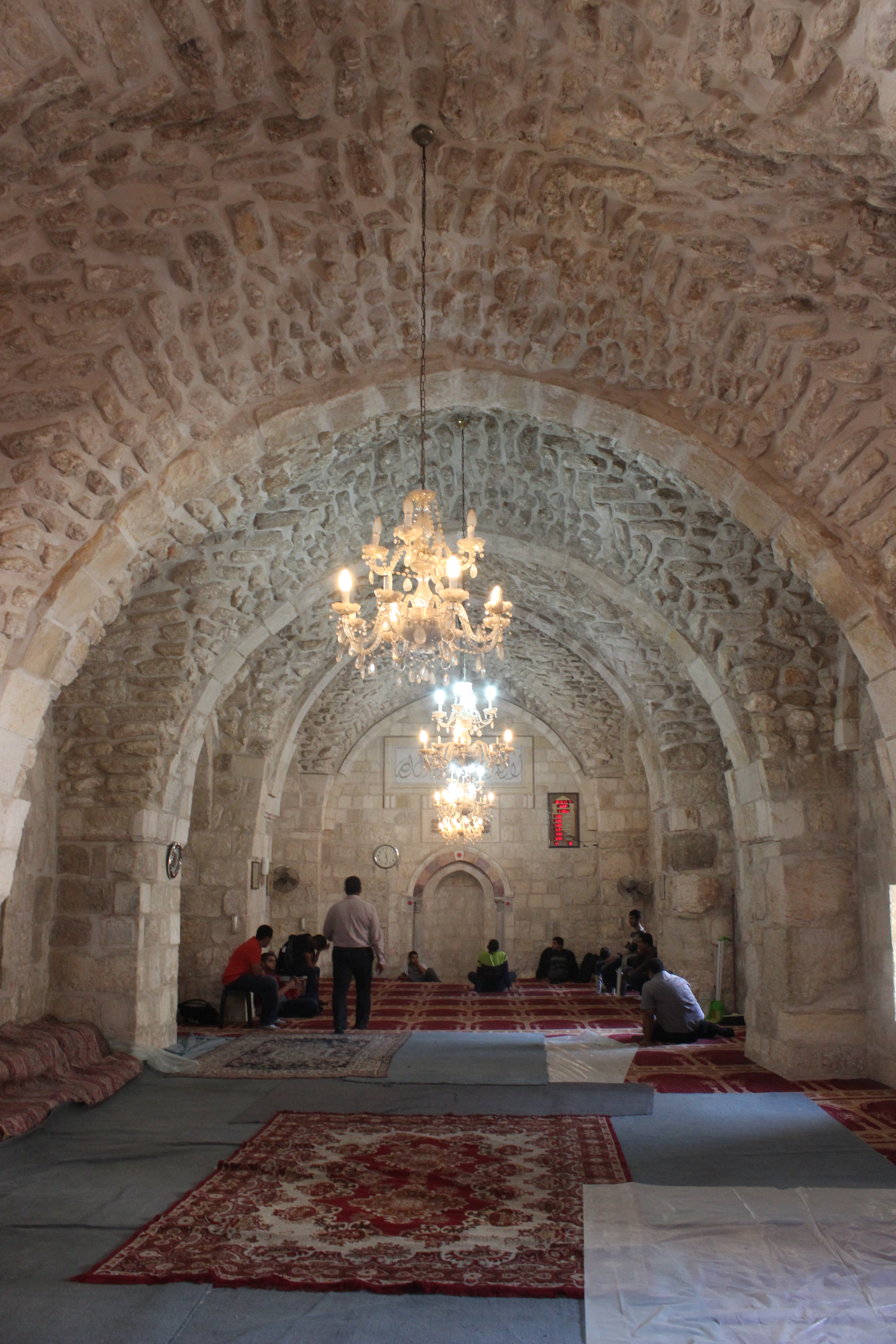

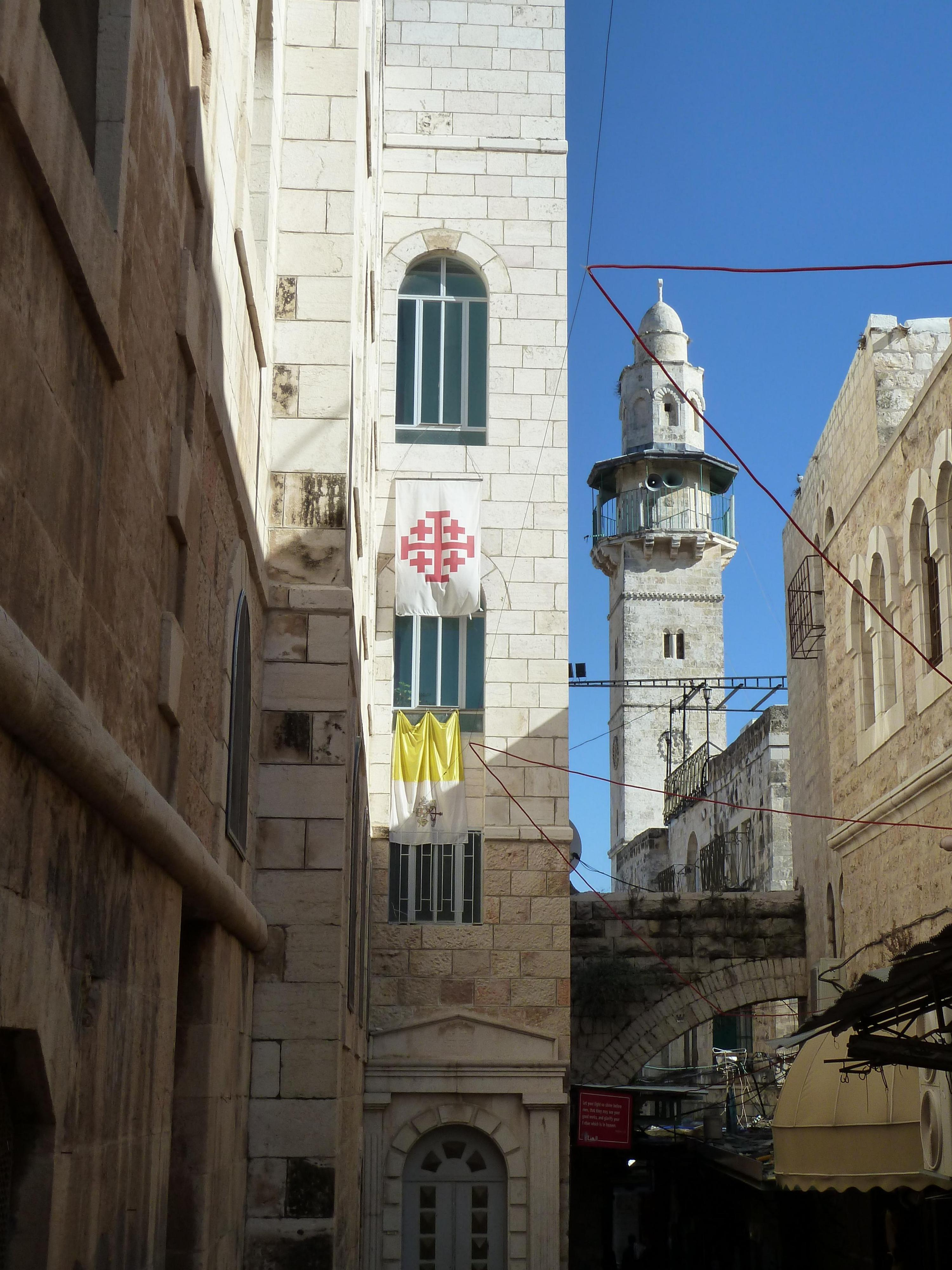

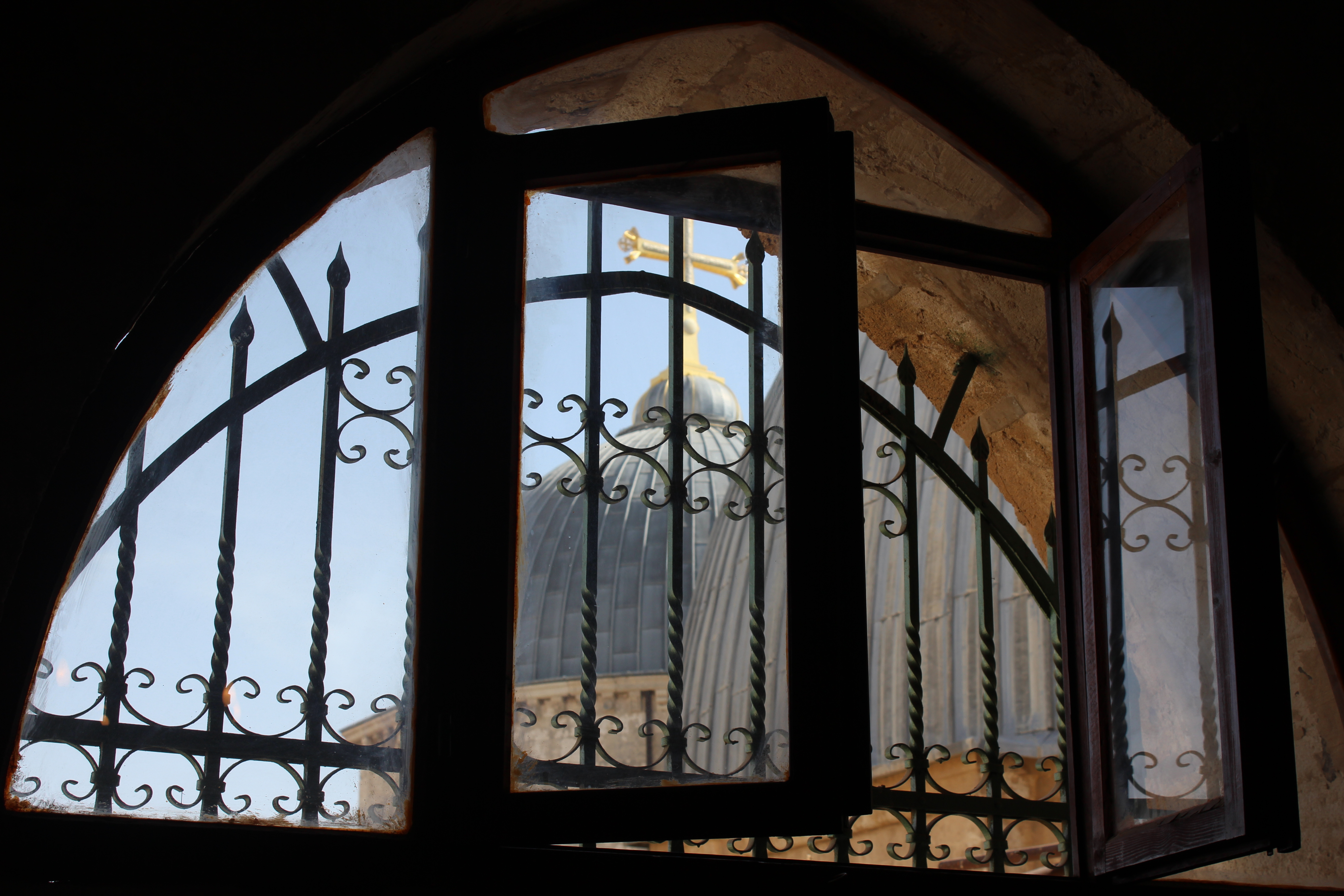

== See also ==
- List of mosques in Jerusalem
- Islam in Israel
- Islam in Palestine
