= Greek Orthodox Church of Saint John the Baptist, Jerusalem =

Eastern Orthodox church in the Christian Quarter of Jerusalem

Church of Saint John the Baptist
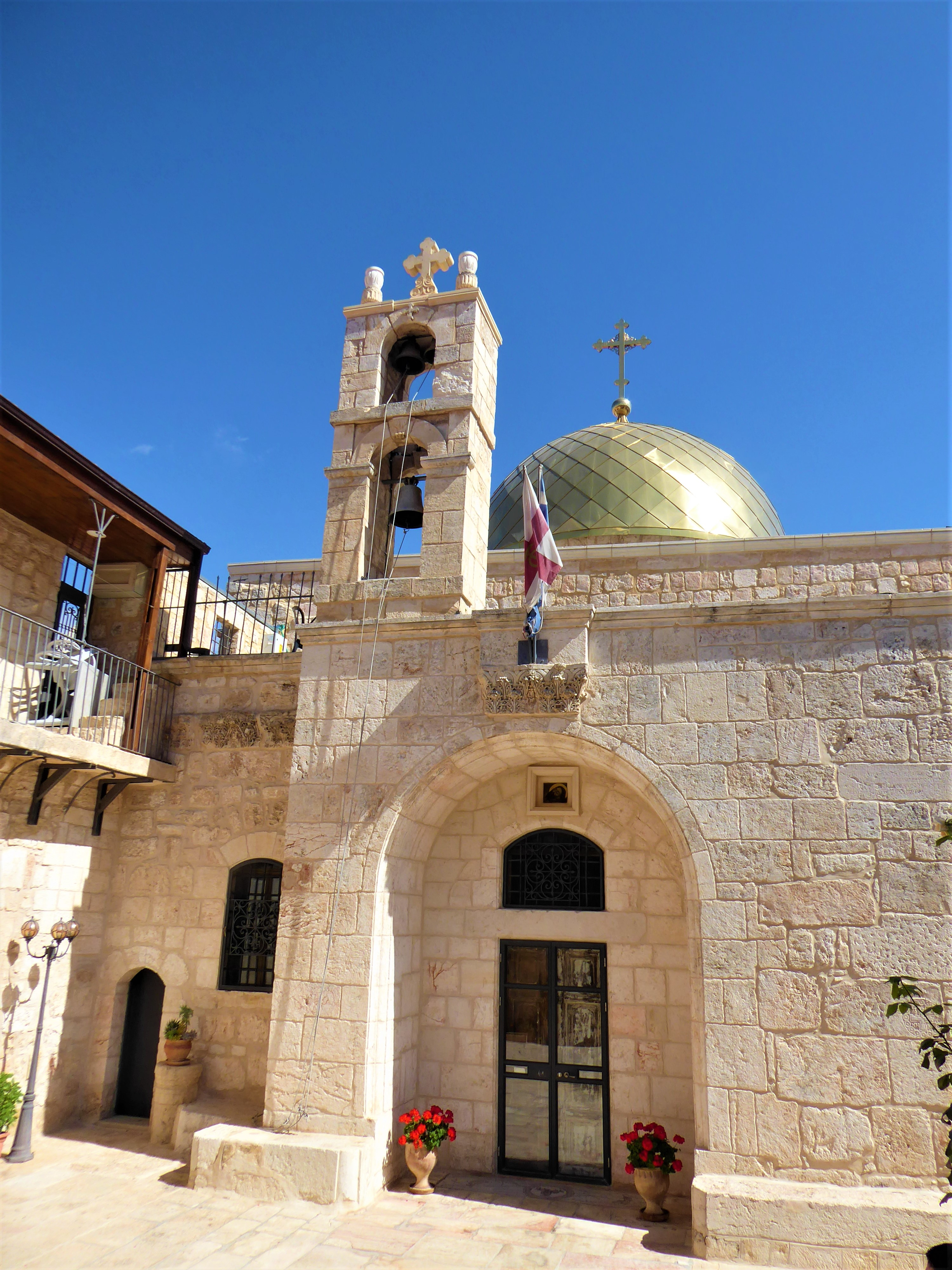

- Location within Jerusalem

Religion
- Affiliation: Christian
- Sect: Greek Orthodox

Location
- Location: Jerusalem
- Interactive map of Church of Saint John the Baptist
- Territory: Christian Quarter of the Old City of Jerusalem
- Coordinates: 31.7769°N 35.2294°E

The Church of Saint John the Baptist (Hebrew: כנסיית יוחנן המטביל) is a small Greek Orthodox church in the Muristan area of the Christian Quarter of Jerusalem. The above-ground churchmostly dates to the 11th century, and the crypt to the Late Roman or Byzantine period (between ca. 324 and 500 AD).

== History ==
=== Byzantine period ===
The first structure, a north-south oriented trefoil building, was built sometime in the 4th-6th century and served for unknown purposes. It was damaged at the Persian conquest of Jerusalem in 614 and then extensively modified. A source can be interpreted to mean that it was restored during the 7th century by John the Almoner, Patriarch of Alexandria.

=== Medieval period ===
By the 11th century the ancient structure was located 3 metres beneath street level, with its doors and windows blocked. It was used as a storage place for goods and water. A group of Amalfitan merchants who settled in Jerusalem at this time acquired the southwest corner of the Hadrianic forum, where they established a pilgrim hospice, complete with a hospital and a church. The new church was erected above the ancient structure, which became its basement and dictated the tri-apsed layout of the church. It was used by Benedictine monks. In 1099, Crusader knights injured during the siege of Jerusalem were treated at the hospital. After recovering, they established the Order of Knights of the Hospital of Saint John of Jerusalem, named after the church, also known as the Knights Hospitaller. After the capture of Jerusalem by Saladin in 1187, the basement was filled with debris.

=== Ottoman period ===
At the end of the 15th century, the Greek Orthodox Patriarchate of Jerusalem acquired the church and transformed the basement into a chapel, which, according to excavator Jean-Baptiste Humbert of the École Biblique, constituted its first use for cultic purposes. During the 16th century, the church was turned int a mosque, but was soon recovered by the Greek Orthodox, who in 1660 built a large pilgrim hospice next to it. In the 19th century, the crypt was cleared out, and an impressive reliquary was brought to light from the masonry of the altar.

== Original purpose ==
=== Scholarly view ===
The long-held opinion that the original Late Roman or Byzantine structure was built as a church, relies in part on John Rufus (born c. AD 450), who in his Plérophories possibly refers to a church dedicated to Saint John the Baptist, in existence in Jerusalem during the 6th century. Byzantine sources refer to a shrine in the western part of Jerusalem that was holding relics of the Baptist's head. There is no archaeological or textual proof that the current John the Baptist Church is the church John Rufus or other Byzantine sources might have alluded to. The Late Roman building excavated by Humbert in 2010-2011, which became the crypt of the current church, bears no Christian architectural marks, but such were not to be expected either during the 4th-6th centuries, when church architecture was still following Roman pre-Christian layouts. Humbert allows for the possibility that a shrine dedicated to the head of the Baptist might not have served eucharistic liturgical purposes, and thus have had an unusual layout; or that an originally secular building may have been rededicated as a church. He also suggests that a restoration of a church in this area by Saint John the Almoner after 614 may have led to a later confusion and an association of the later, medieval church, with the more revered Saint John, namely the Baptist. The fact that the pilgrim hospice built in this same area by Charles the Great in ca. 800 was always mentioned as Saint Mary, not Saint John, indicates though that the connection with the Baptist is of later date.

Be it as it may, at the arrival of the Amalfitans in the 11th century this tradition already existed, and they dedicated their new church, to which the ancient structure served as the basement, to St John the Baptist.

Humbert proposes that the initial structure was used for the first time for ritual purposes by the Greek Orthodox, in the 19th century, as an underground chapel beneath the 11th-century church.

Humbert does not dismiss the possibility that the ancient structure might have been erected as a secular building by Constantine the Great, or as a Christian shrine or church by either Eudoсia (as suggested by Byzantine sources), even more likely by Justinian, or by Anastasius, who had built a church dedicated to the Baptist at the Jordan River around the year 500.

=== Traditional view ===
The traditional view holds that the ancient building was already founded as a church in 450-460 by Empress Eudoсia and restored after the destruction by Persians in 614.

According to one Greek Orthodox tradition, the head of St. John the Baptist was held in this church.

== Archaeological investigation ==
The medieval church and the Late Roman or Byzantine structure which serves as its crypt were surveyed and excavated several times.

- 1914 and 1919: H. Vincent and F. Abel documented the site
- 2010-2011: the Late Roman structure was excavated by Jean-Baptiste Humbert before being renovated by the Greek Orthodox

== Description ==
The upper church has 3 apses and a long narthex, its dome is supported by 4 pillars. The building follows a trefoil plan without a traditional nave, a layout dictated by the shape of the Byzantine crypt below. The interior features a green and gold iconostasis dating to 1853, which is one of the longest in Jerusalem; it is decorated with icons depicting the life of John the Baptist and houses a jeweled reliquary said to contain a fragment of his skull.

The walls are covered in 20th-century frescoes painted by Romanian artists Michael and Gabriel Moroshan. Notable murals include the Anastasis (Jesus pulling Adam and Eve from their graves), portraits of the Four Evangelists on the ceiling, and scenes of Zechariah, the Baptist's father, in the entry area. Externally, the church is recognized by its modern double bell tower and a silver-painted dome that rises above the Muristan market.
