= Muwaffaq al-Din Yaqub ibn Siqlab =

Palestinian physician (1165/6–1228)

- مُوَفَّقُ ٱلدِّينِ بْنِ يَعْقُوبِ بْنِ سِقْلَاب
- Born: 1165/6 (561 AH); Old City of Jerusalem, Kingdom of Jerusalem
- Died: 1228 (Easter); Damascus, Ayyubid Sultanate
- Education: Mar Saba monastery (philosophy, medicine)
- Occupation: Physician
- Employer: Al-Mu'azzam Isa
- Known for: Director of the Salahi Bi-maristan, Jerusalem; personal physician to Al-Mu'azzam Isa

Muwaffaq ad-Din Yaqub ibn Siqlab (Arabic: مُوَفَّقُ ٱلدِّينِ بْنِ يَعْقُوبِ بْنِ سِقْلَاب (muwaffaqu d-dīni bni yaʿqūbi bni siqlāb); 1165/6 – 1228), or simply Ibn Siqlab, was a Palestinian and Melkite Christian physician from the Old City of Jerusalem. He studied in the Kingdom of Jerusalem ruled by the Frankish crusaders and worked in Ayyubid-ruled Jerusalem and Damascus. He was a respected medical expert in both cities.

== Jerusalem ==
According to the Arab historian Ibn Fadlallah al-'Umari, Ibn Siqlab was born in 1165 or 1166 (561 AH). Ibn Abi Usaybi'ah, who studied and worked alongside him in Damascus, includes an entry on Ibn Siqlab in his biographical encyclopedia of physicians ,Uyūn ul-Anbāʾ fī Ṭabaqāt al-Aṭibbā (Arabic: عيون الأنباء في طبقات الأطباء). He notes therein that Ibn Siqlab undertook studies in philosophy and medicine in a local (Jerusalem area) monastery with a learned man named only as "the Antioch philosopher" (الفيلسوف الأنطاكي), describing this teacher as possessing great wisdom encompassing the natural sciences, geometry, arithmetic, astrology, astronomy and the forecasting of fates. The monastery referred to is likely to have been Mar Saba, an important center of learning, housing an extensive library and centuries old pedagogical tradition where the translation of Greek and Syriac texts into Arabic was regularly pursued.

Ibn Siqlab managed a hospital in the Old City of Jerusalem, the Salahi Bi-maristan, a public clinical institution, secular in orientation, that also served as a kind of school of medicine, and whose name is still preserved in Muristan, Jerusalem today. Founded by Salahaddin before 1193 adjacent to an older hospital run by the Knights Hospitaller, this institutional health model was also extant in both Cairo and Damascus at the time. One of Ibn Siqlab's medical colleagues in Jerusalem was Shaykh Abu Mansur al-Nasrani al-Tabib, another Melkite physician.

== Damascus ==
Seeking to expand his knowledge, and at some point following Salahaddin's conquest of Karak in 1187-8, Ibn Siqlab went to Damascus to seek the counsel of Muwaffaq al-Din Yaqub Ibn al-Mutran, another Arab Christian who had adopted Islam and had served Salahaddin in his battles against the Crusaders. Al-Mutran was known to Ibn Siqlab, as he had come for a pilgrimage to Jerusalem before returning to Damascus. He was also well known for his vast knowledge of the sciences, and extensive resources, storing 10,000 scientific volumes and employing three copyists. In their first meeting, Al-Mutran advised Ibn Siqlab not to wear his Frankish influenced medical outfit, consisting of a sleeved blue gown with a small headscarf, if he wanted to work in Damascus.

Ibn Siqlab first took up service as a personal physician to the Ayyubid lord of Sidon and Nablus, and went on to serve the emir Al-Mu'azzam Isa, ruler of Damascus and governor of Jerusalem, and the nephew of Salahaddin. Ibn Abi Usaybi'ah wrote he worked and studied with Ibn Siqlab in al-Mu'azzam's army camp.

Of Ibn Siqlab, Ibn Abi Usaybi'ah recounts that he had memorized and often quoted entire commentaries from Galen (known by his Greek name "Galenus" in Arabic) "verbatim", even providing page numbers (according to those in his own copies), and regularly referring to him as a primary resource when approaching a problem or evaluating a potential course of treatment. He was also an avid follower of the work of Hippocrates ("Epicrat"), and Ibn Abi Usaybi'ah fondly recalls their intensive probing of his writings together in Damascus. Al-Dhahabi (1274-1348) also records that Ibn Siqlab was fluent in both Classical Greek and Arabic and could translate Greek texts with ease. He also had knowledge of Latin.

Al-Dhahabi recounts that Ibn Siqlab continued to work for the emir, even while he himself had developed a bad case of gout, with the emir providing a dedicated sedan for his transport, so that he could continue to accompany and advise him when possible. When al-Muazzem asked him why, despite his great expertise he could not heal himself, Ibn Siqlab replied, "My Lord, when wood rots, there is no trick that can fix it." Ibn Siqlab remained in al-Muazzem's service until the latter's death in 1227. Al-Malik Nasir, his son and successor, continued to provide for all of Ibn Siqlab's needs as his health continued to deteriorate. Ibn Siqlab died in Damascus on Easter in 1228.
