= Razzouk Tattoo =

Tattoo parlor in Jerusalem

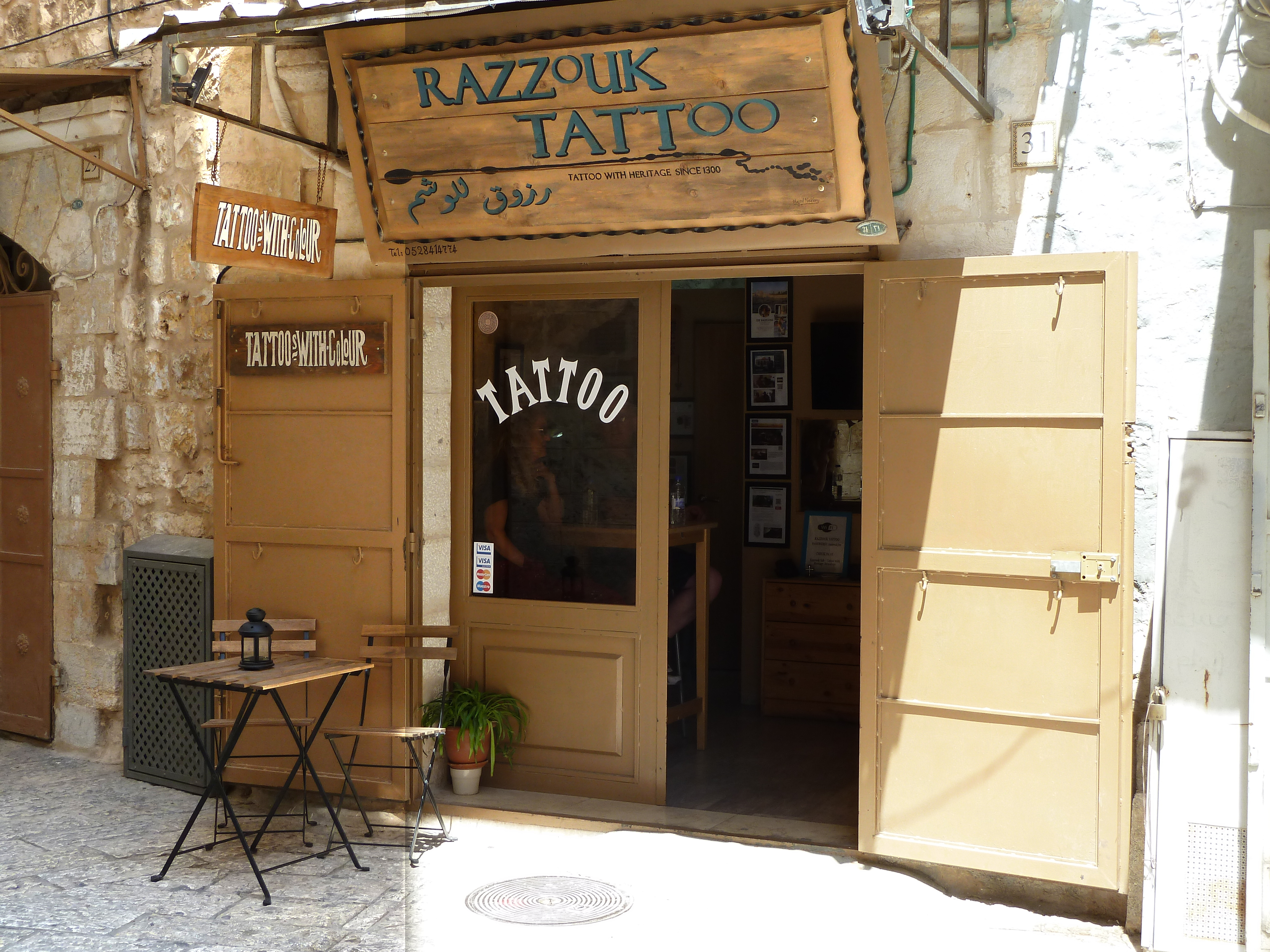
- Razzouk Tattoo in the Old City of Jerusalem
- Established: c. 1300 (family business); c. 1750 (in Jerusalem)
- Coordinates: 31°46′38″N 35°13′42″E
- Services: Religious tattoos
- Methods: Olive wood block stenciling
- Affiliations: Coptic Christianity
- Website: razzouktattoo.com

Razzouk Tattoo, also known simply as Razzouk, is a tattoo parlor in Jerusalem which primarily provides tattoos to Christian pilgrims. Known as the oldest tattoo business in the world, the parlor is owned by the Coptic Christian Razzouk family. Having originally begun practicing tattoo artistry in the 14th century in Egypt, the family immigrated to Jerusalem in the 18th century.

== Background ==
The tradition of Christian pilgrims receiving tattoos has been documented since the 8th century. In Coptic Christianity specifically, tattooing was often done to identify oneself as a Christian—similar to wearing a crucifix or cross necklace. The specific Coptic practice of tattooing a cross on the inside of the right wrist may have originated from Ethiopian custom, and served as a method of ethnic and religious identification in predominantly Muslim society. It was seen as a reminder and verification of one's faith, and a way of making it impossible to apostatize. Crusaders began to receive tattoos as a memorial of their time in the Holy Land. In the 17th century, Johann Lund and William Lithgow both documented visitors receiving tattoos as a sign and memorial of their pilgrimages. By the 20th century, it was a strong social expectation that Coptic Christians receive a pilgrim tattoo for the pilgrimage to be considered valid.

The Razzouk family estimates they have been in the art of tattooing for 27 generations, or around 700 years. The family, originally from Egypt, moved to Jerusalem in the eighteenth century, joining a small community of Coptic Christians. They initially tattooed customers in the courtyards of churches before acquiring their current storefront. Jersuis Razzouk, a Coptic priest, was the primary practitioner of the family at the time, settling in Jerusalem in 1750. Prior to the 1948 Arab–Israeli War, several other families provided tattoos to pilgrims in Jerusalem, Bethlehem, and Jaffa; The Razzouk family is the only remaining tattooist family after the establishment of the modern state of Israel.

== Operation ==
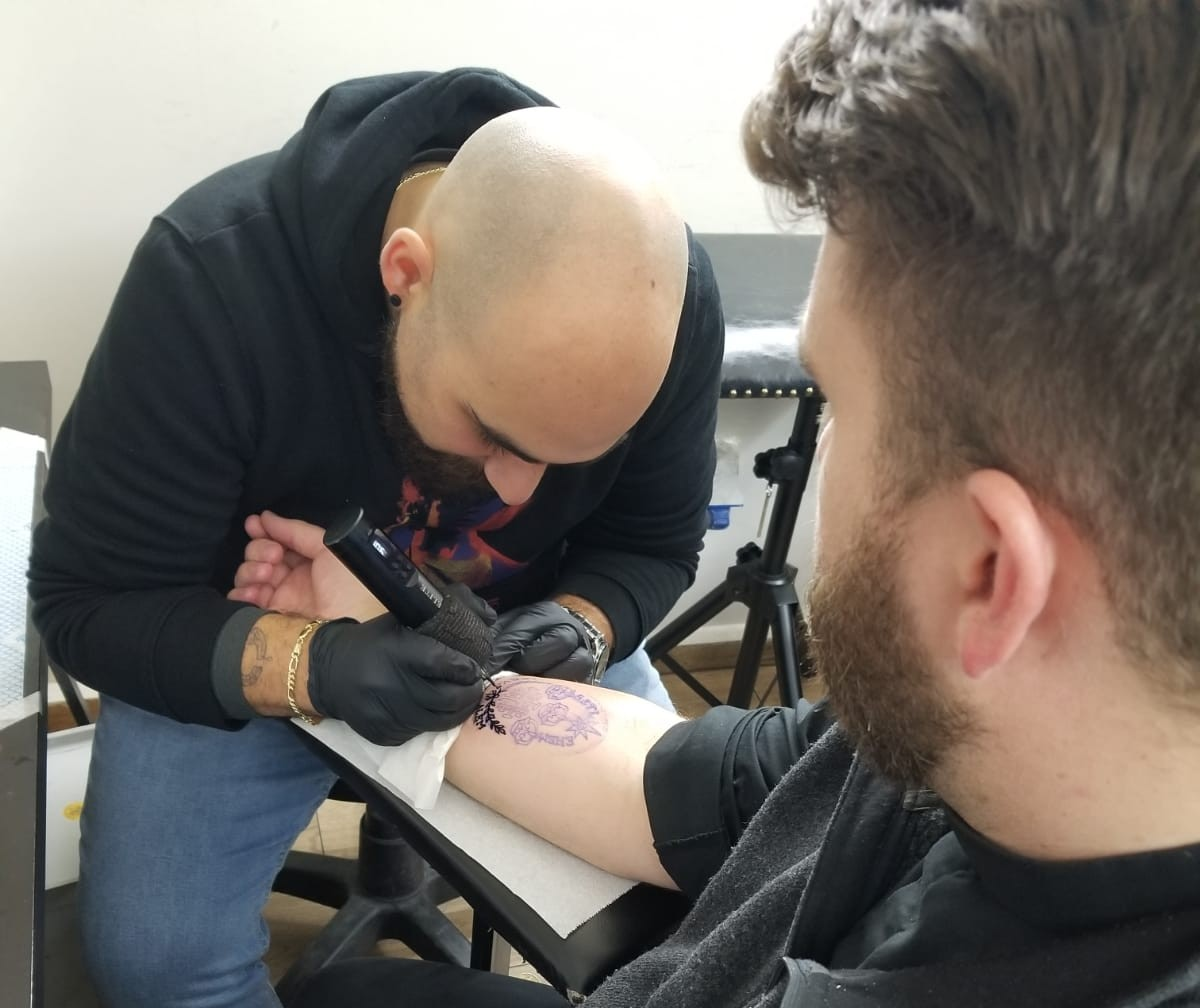
A Catholic deacon receiving a tattoo at Razzouk

Razzouk uses wooden blocks with tattoo images carved into them which double as both a catalogue and pseudo-stencil; ink is placed on the stencil, the block is pressed upon the skin, leaving behind a trace of ink which guides the needle. The blocks are made of olive wood. The Razzouk family dates some of the blocks to the seventeenth century; one block bears the date 1749 in Armenian script. While the family originally had more than 140 designs, only around 80 remain, with the others having been lost or now in museums. The blocks were documented in a 1958 book by John Carswell of the American University of Beirut. The traditional pilgrim tattoo is a cross on the right wrist. Pilgrims who visit Jerusalem multiple times may tattoo their left wrist as well. Other designs include motifs of the Virgin Mary and the Crucifixion, the Jerusalem cross, or St. George slaying the dragon. A practice existed in the 20th century for virgin women to have an Annunciation design as a prayer for fertility.

While most of their business comes from Christians, given that tattoos are traditionally considered haram in Islam and forbidden in Judaism, Jewish hipsters and younger Palestinian Muslims do number among their patrons. In 2022, Razzouk opened a new, Western-style parlor in West Jerusalem, catering to locals wanting more modern tattoos, separate from the more traditional pilgrim-focused location near the Jaffa Gate.

Notable recipients of tattoos from Razzouk include Haile Selassie—last emperor of Ethiopia—and Fr. Mike Schmitz, host of The Bible in a Year podcast. Members of the American pop band OneRepublic have also been tattooed by Razzouk, as well as Evangelical pastor Matt Chandler. It is speculated that Razzouk may have given tattoos to Prince Albert Edward (the future King Edward VII), Prince Albert Victor, and Prince George (the future King George V). Hundreds of Allied troops received tattoos during World War II. As of 2013, the parlor's owner estimated he tattooed between 300 and 400 pilgrims a year, with other family members tattooing additional customers, occasionally going to hotels to do so due to demand. Guinness World Records recognizes Razzouk as the world's longest-running tattoo business.

Razzouk licenses their brand and stamp designs to other tattoo artists around the world; those who do so must be Christian and spend several weeks at Razzouk in Jerusalem learning the stamps and their history. Licensed artists operate in the United Kingdom, Italy, the Netherlands, Ireland, France, and the United States.
