= Mosque of Omar (Jerusalem) =

Mosque in the Christian Quarter of Jerusalem

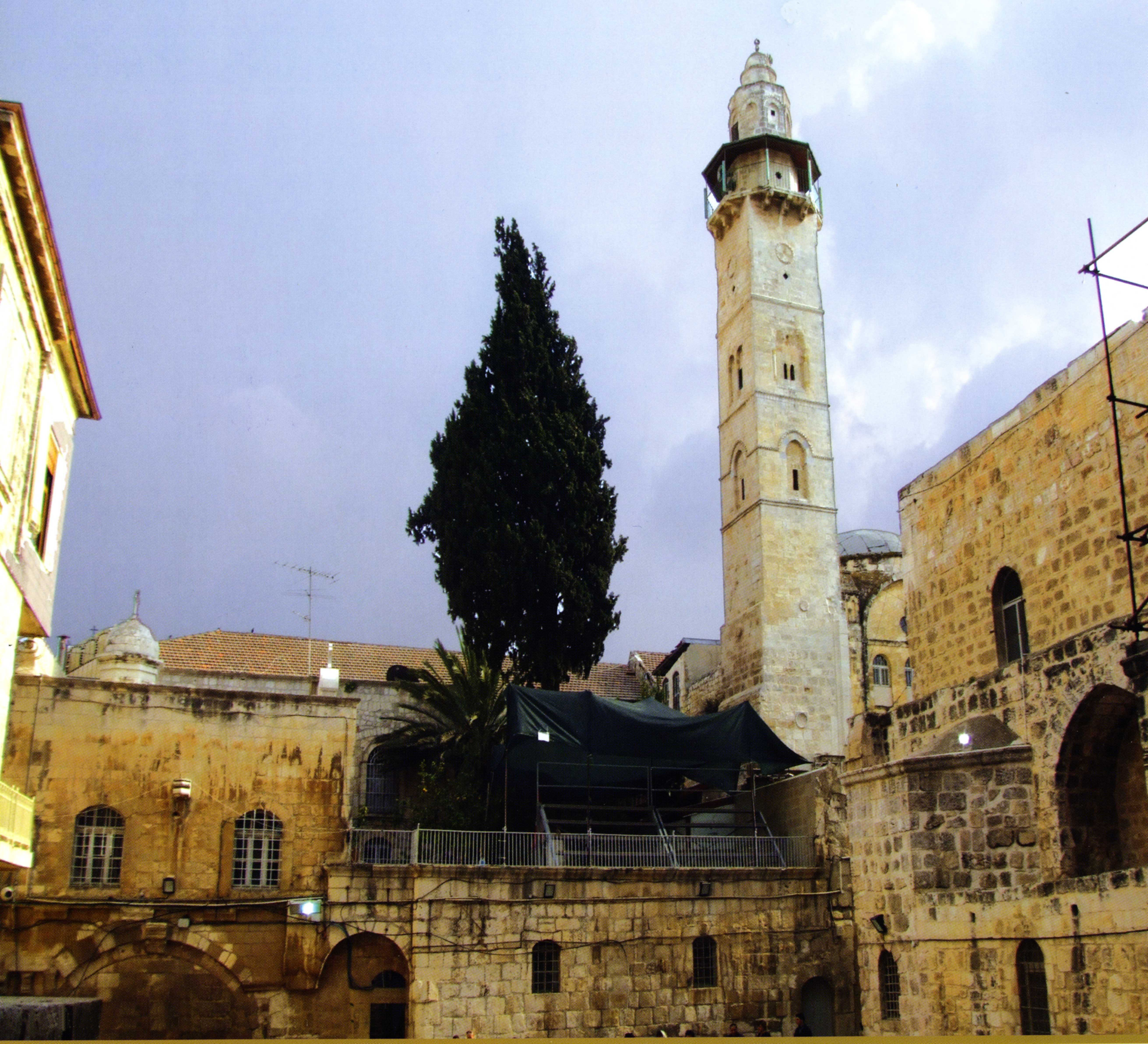
- Minaret of the Mosque next to the courtyard of the Church of the Holy Sepulchre

- Location of the mosque in the Old City of Jerusalem

Religion
- Affiliation: Islam
- Branch/tradition: Sunni
- Ecclesiastical or organisational status: Mosque
- Status: Active

Location
- Location: Christian Quarter, Old City, Jerusalem
- Interactive map of Mosque of Omar
- Coordinates: 31°46′40″N 35°13′47″E

Architecture
- Type: Mosque
- Style: Ayyubid; Mamluk
- Founder: Al-Afdal ibn Salah ad-Din
- Completed: 1193 CE; c. 1450s (minaret)

Specifications
- Minaret: One
- Minaret height: 15 m (49 ft)

The Mosque of Omar (Arabic: مسجد عمر بن الخطاب) is a mosque, located inside the Old City of Jerusalem. Situated opposite the southern courtyard of the Church of the Holy Sepulchre, in the Muristan area of the Christian Quarter, the mosque is not open to tourists, and can be accessed only for praying. The mosque was completed during the Ayyubid era.

== History ==
According to local tradition, after the Siege of Jerusalem in 637 by the Rashidun army under the command of Abu Ubaidah ibn al-Jarrah, Patriarch Sophronius refused to surrender except to the Caliph Omar (579–644) himself. Omar travelled to Jerusalem and accepted the surrender. He then approached the Church of the Holy Sepulchre and Patriarch Sophronius invited the Caliph to pray inside the church, but Omar declined so as not to set a precedent and thereby endanger the church's status as a Christian site. Instead he prayed outside, on the steps east of the church. The Mosque of Omar was later built at that site, as evidenced by a stone plate with a Kufic inscription found in 1897 in the area of the eastern or outer atrium of the Constantinian (4th-century) Church of the Holy Sepulchre, defining this area as a mosque.

The current structure was built in its current shape by the Ayyubid Sultan Al-Afdal ibn Salah ad-Din in 1193 to commemorate the prayer of the caliph Omar.

== Architecture ==
The current structure was built in its current shape by the Ayyubid Sultan Al-Afdal ibn Salah ad-Din in 1193 to commemorate the prayer of the caliph Omar. The entrance to the Church of the Holy Sepulchre had by then moved from the east to the south of the church, as a result of repeated destructive events that affected the Holy Sepulchre and Muslim mosques during the 11th and 12th centuries.

The current mosque building has a 15-metre-high (49 ft) minaret that was built sometime before 1465 during the Mamluk period, maybe after the 1458 earthquake, and was renovated by Ottoman sultan Abdulmecid I (r. 1839–1860).

The Al-Khanqah al-Salahiyya Mosque, located on the other (northern) side of the Church of the Holy Sepulchre, has an almost identical minaret, erected in 1418.

== Gallery ==
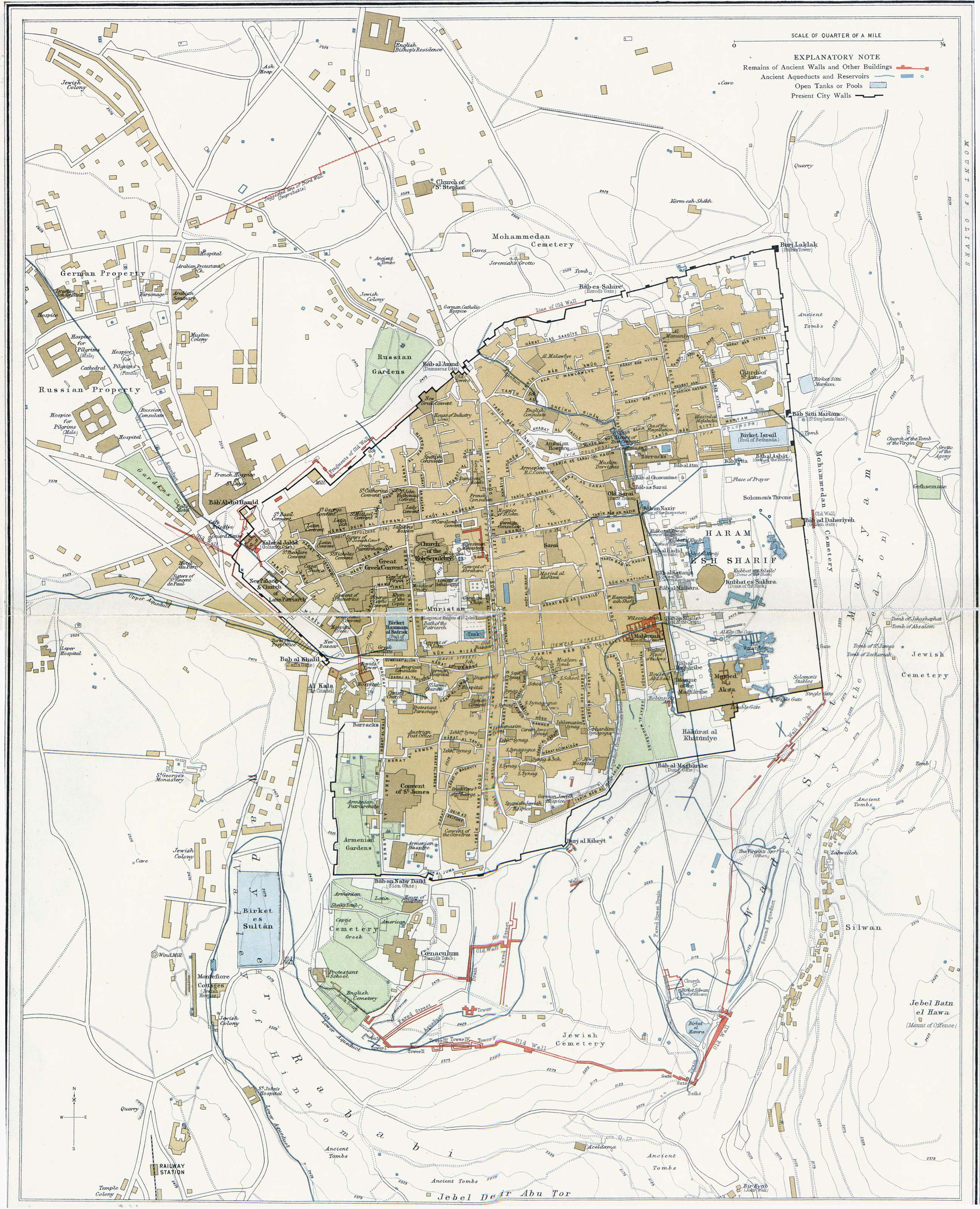
In this 1915 map, the Mosque appears south of the Holy Sepulchre in Muristan, near the vertical middle of the map.

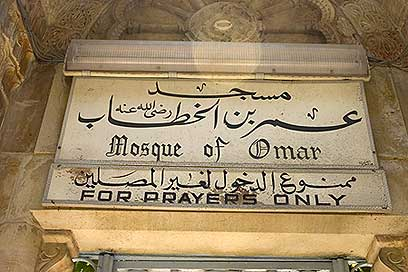
The Mosque has been reserved for religious activities

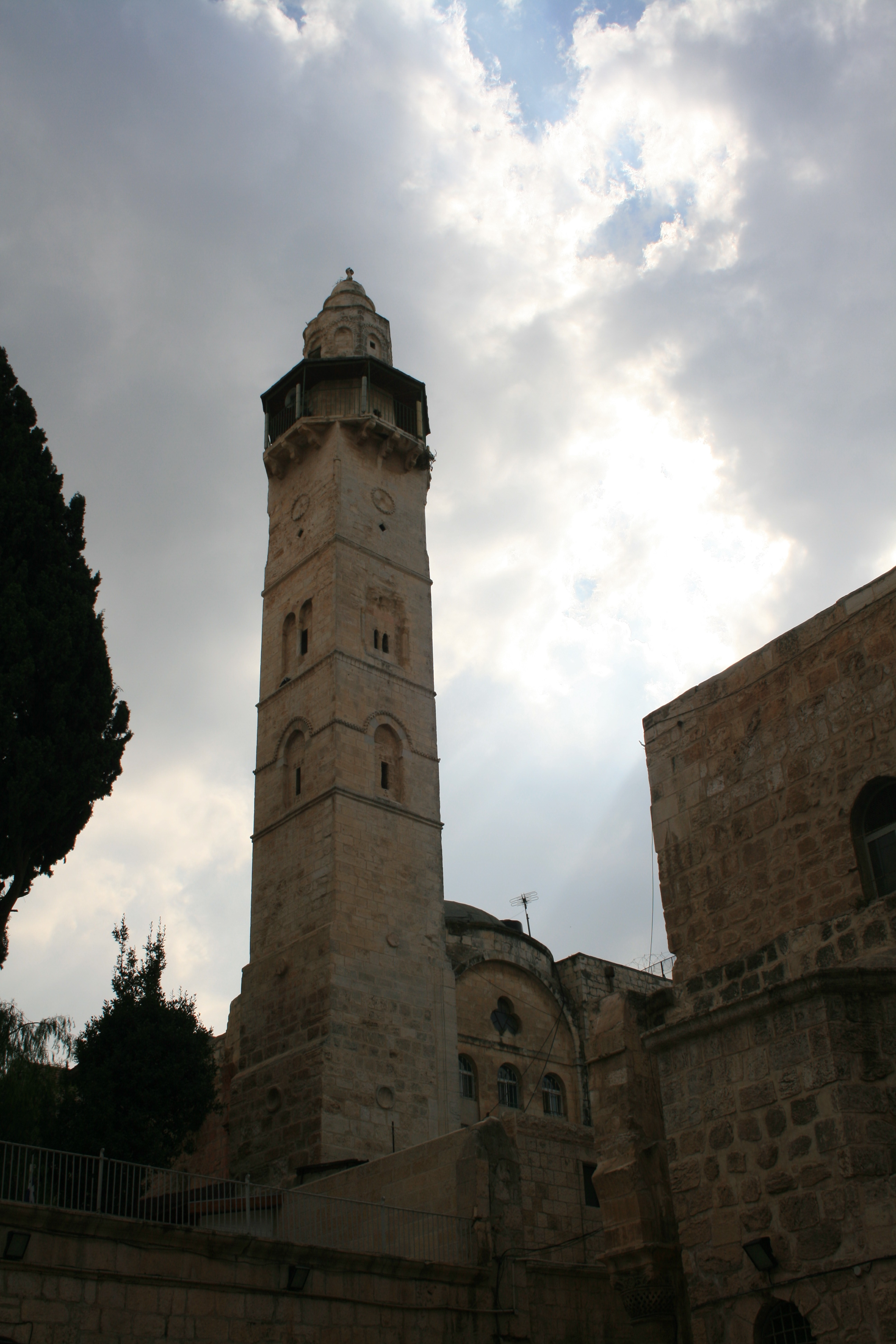
Minaret

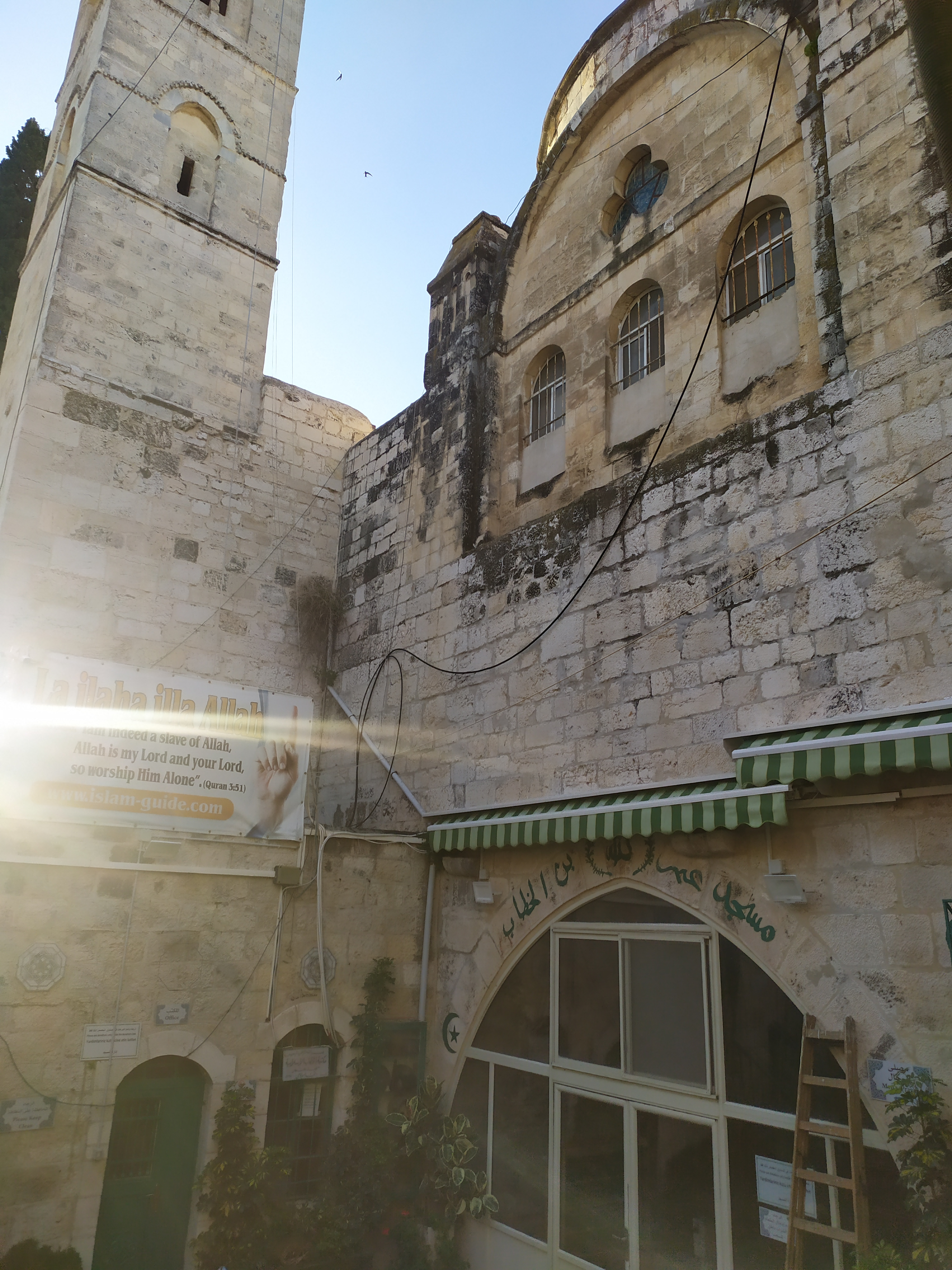

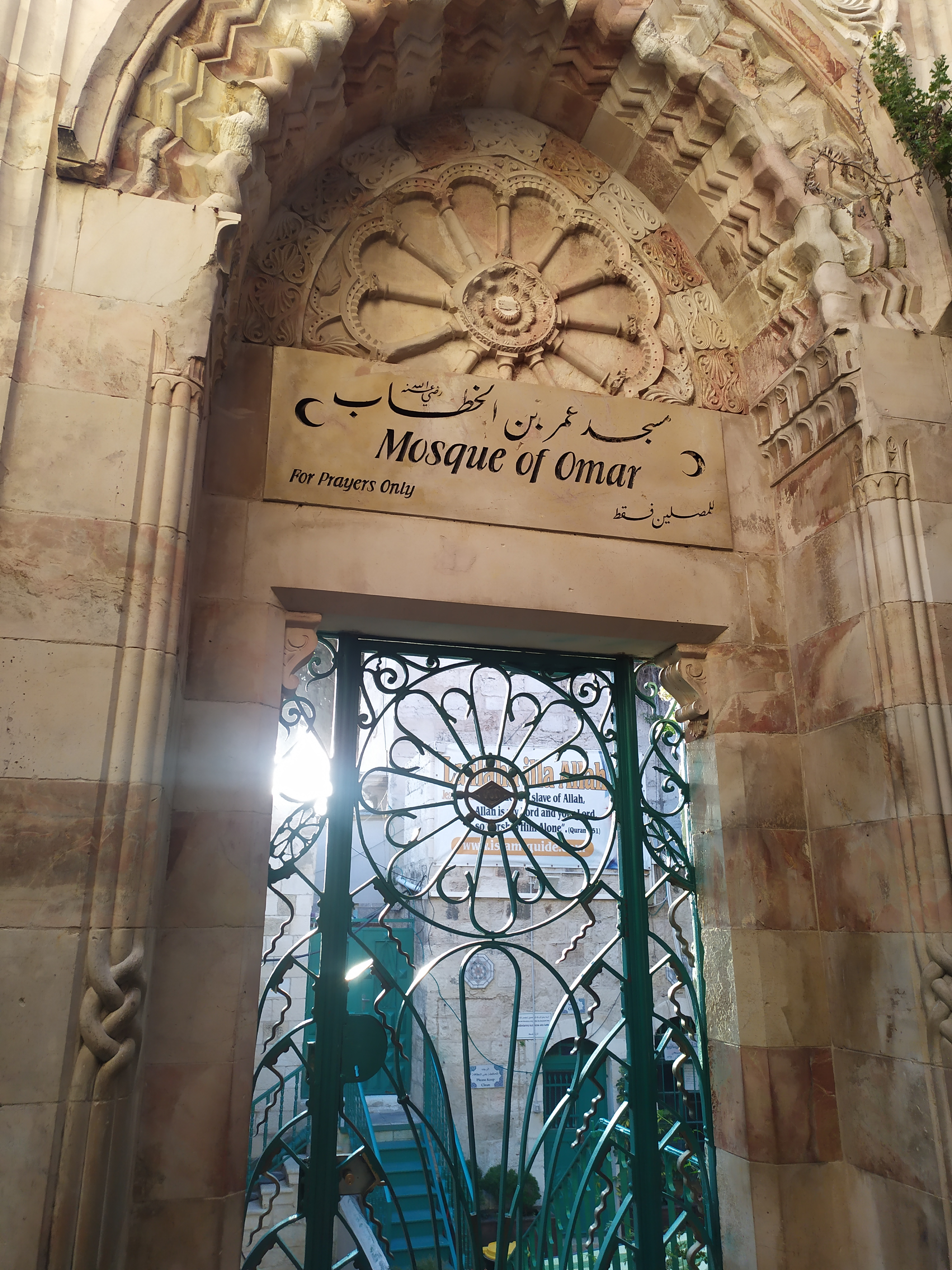

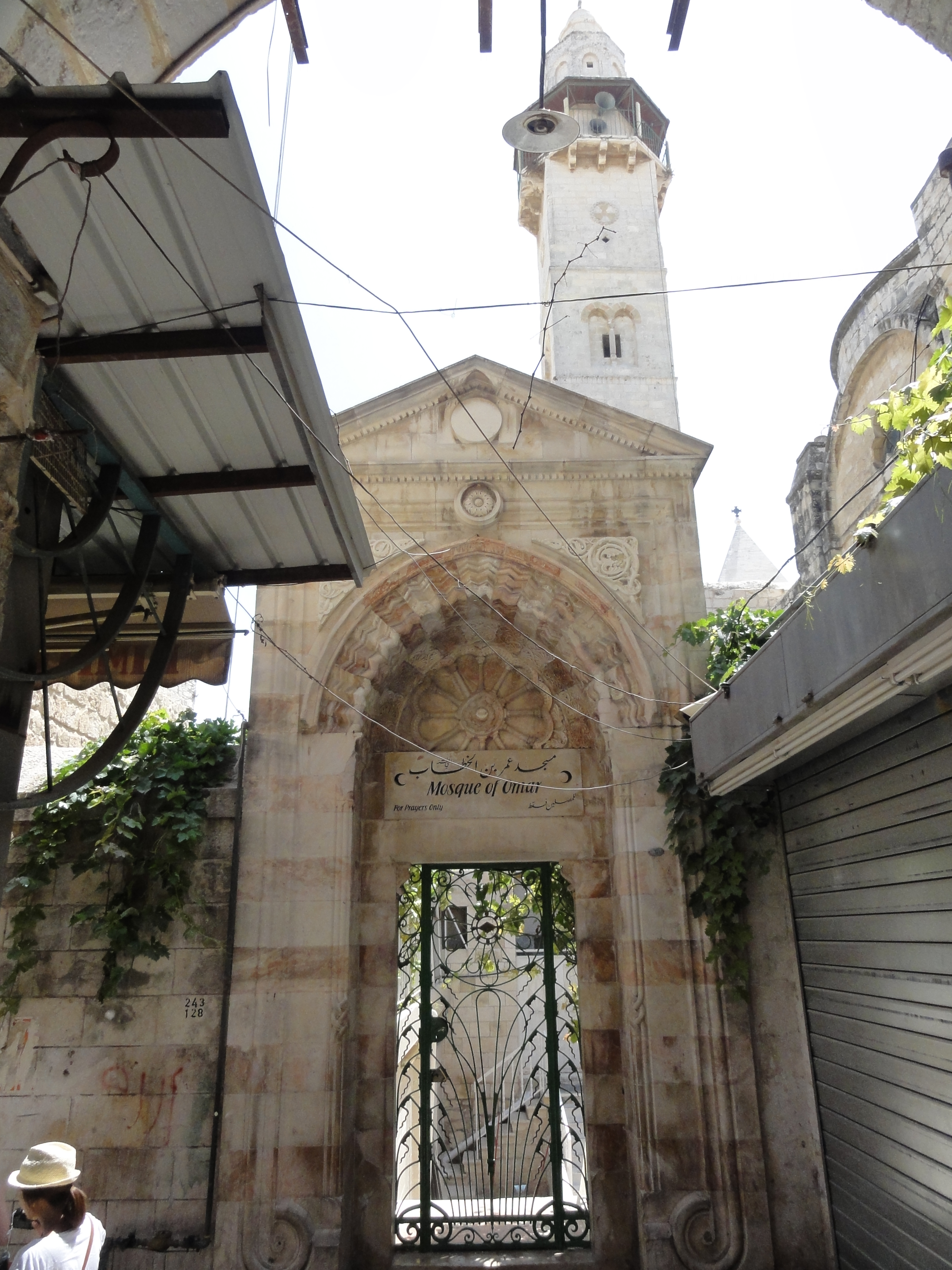
