= Muristan =

Complex of streets and shops in the Old City of Jerusalem, Israel

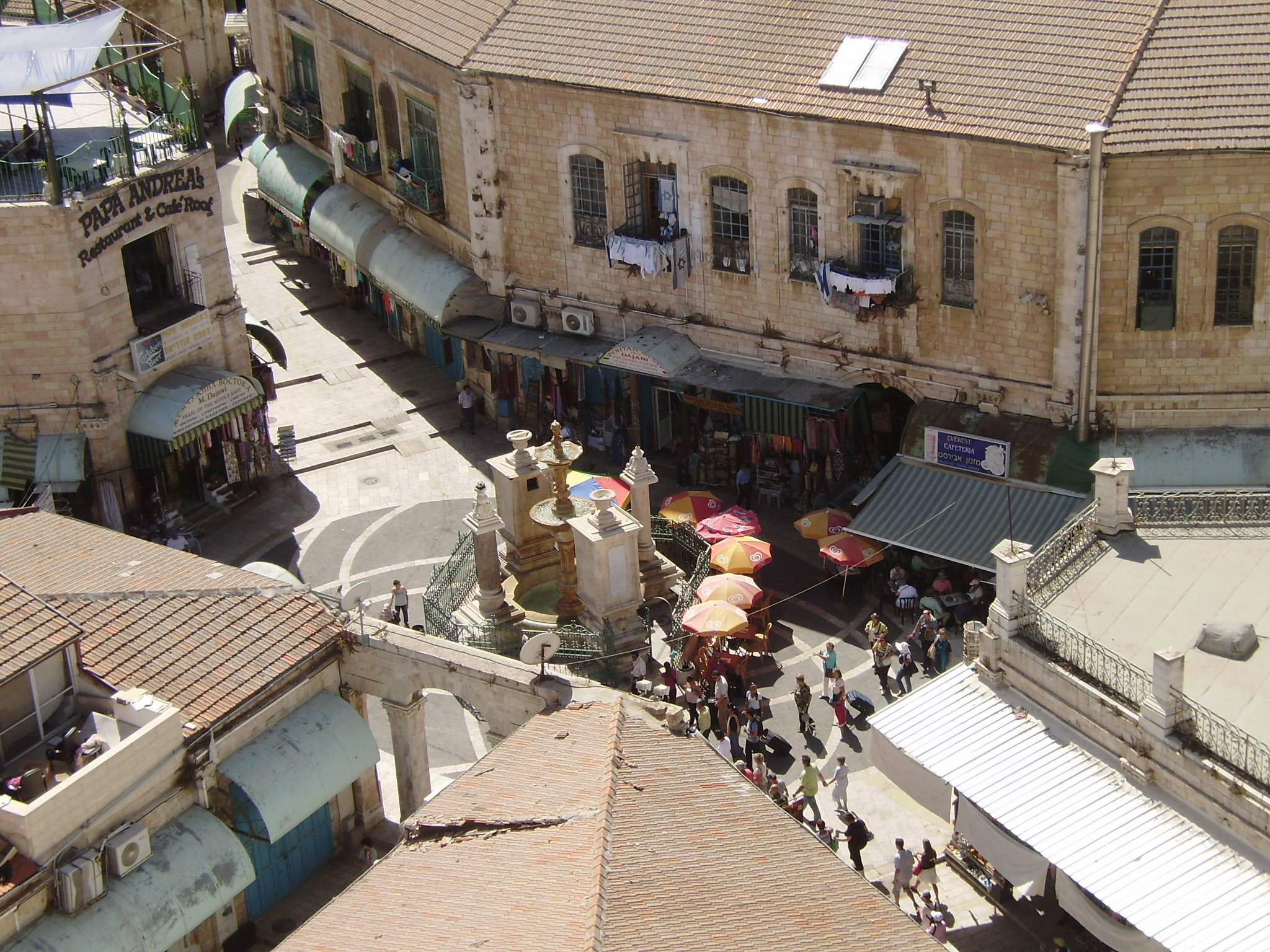
- The market area of the Muristan, Suq Aftimos, with the Muristan fountain at its centre

- Location within Old City of Jerusalem
- Coordinates: 31°46′39″N 35°13′47″E
- City: Old City of Jerusalem
- Quarter: Christian Quarter
- Established: 11th century

The Muristan (Arabic: مورستان; Hebrew: מוריסטן) is a complex of streets and shops in the Christian Quarter of the Old City of Jerusalem. It was the location of the Bimaristan built by Saladin adjacent to an older hospital built by the Knights Hospitaller. The name Muristan is derived from the Persian word Bimārestān, meaning "hospital".

== Christianity ==
The area just south of the Church of the Holy Sepulchre has a long tradition dating to the days of Judas Maccabeus in the 2nd century BC, based on incidents recorded in the Second Book of Maccabees. According to the legend, King Antiochus V proceeded to Jerusalem to punish the High Priest for plundering David's Tomb. While on Golgotha, the king was directed in a divine vision to pardon the High Priest, and to build a hospital for the care of the sick and poor on that spot. In 1496, William Caoursin, Vice-Chancellor of the Hospitallers, wrote that Judas Maccabaeus and John Hyrcanus founded the hospital on that spot.

== History ==
=== Roman period ===
Doron Bar suggested that the Tenth Legion's camp, established on the ruins of Jerusalem following its destruction in the First Jewish–Roman War (66–73 CE), was located in the area of the Muristan and its neighboring regions.

In 130, Hadrian visited the ruins of Jerusalem in Judaea and rebuilt the city, renaming it Aelia Capitolina after himself and Jupiter Capitolinus, the chief deity of Rome. Hadrian placed the city's main forum at the junction of the main two streets, the Cardo Maximus and the Decumanus Maximus, now the location for the (smaller) Muristan. Hadrian built a large temple to the goddess Venus, at whose location Emperor Constantine the Great later built the Church of the Holy Sepulchre.

=== Byzantine period ===
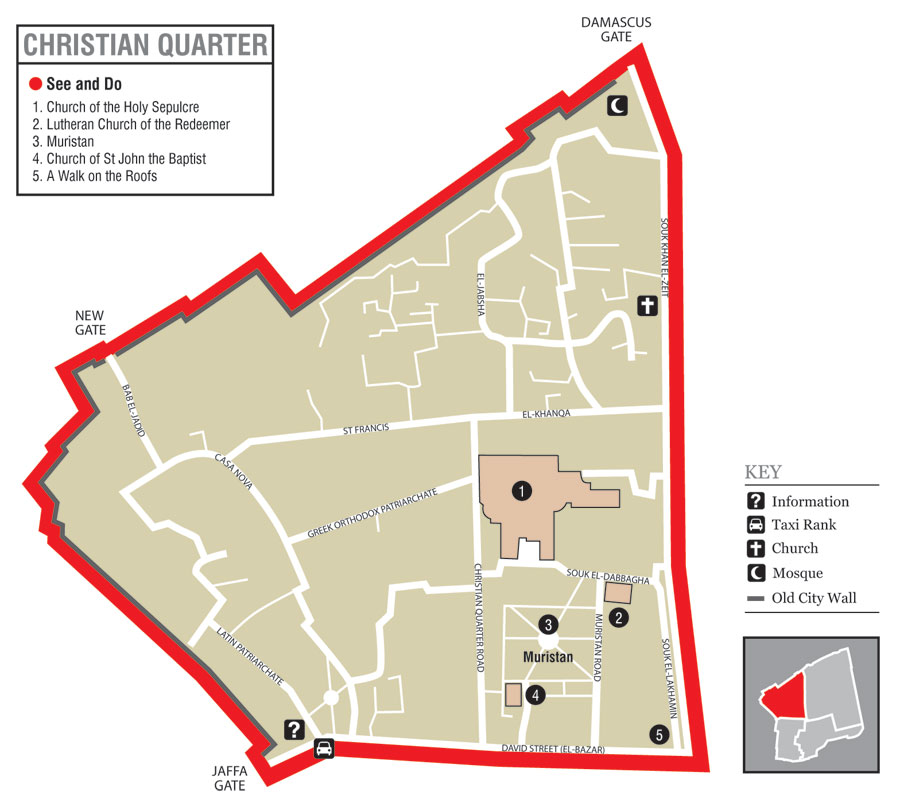
Map of the Christian Quarter in Jerusalem with the Muristan and the Church of St. John shown in the lower right-hand corner (click image to enlarge)

The earliest historical mention of the location Muristan is in AD 600, when a certain Abbot Probus was commissioned by Pope Gregory the Great to build a hospital in Jerusalem to treat and care for Christian pilgrims to the Holy Land. This hospice was most likely destroyed about fourteen years later when Jerusalem fell to the Persian army, the Christian inhabitants were slaughtered, and their churches and monasteries destroyed (see Revolt against Heraclius). The building was probably restored after Jerusalem fell again under Byzantine dominion in 628.

=== Early Muslim period ===
Arab rule after 637 allowed freedom of worship, and the restored hospice was probably allowed to continue serving its original purpose. In 800, Charlemagne, Emperor of the Holy Roman Empire, enlarged the hostel and added a library to it. Bernard the Monk, who wrote an account of his visit to Jerusalem in 870, mentions a Benedictine hospital close to the Church of the Holy Sepulchre. In 993, Hugh Marquis of Tuscany and his wife endowed the hospital with considerable property in Italy.

In 1009, Fatimid caliph Al Hakim destroyed the hostel and a large number of other buildings in Jerusalem. In 1023, merchants from Amalfi and Salerno in Italy were given permission by the caliph Ali az-Zahir to rebuild the hospice, monastery and chapel in Jerusalem. Among these merchants from Amalfi and Salerno was also Mauros, merchant from Amalfi, of a family from Constantinople, Miletus and Amalfi, who gave together with his mother Anna and her brother Constantine a gift to the convent of Saint Lawrence in Amalfi, which probably had some connection to blessed Gerard the founder of the Order of the Knights of St. John of Jerusalem the Knights Hospitaller.

In Palestine and Syria, there was a revolt among the Bedouins (1024–1029). In an agreement in 1027 between Ali az-Zahir and Constantine VIII, Constantine VIII allowed the name of the caliph to be acknowledged in the mosques in the emperor's domain and the mosque at Constantinople to be restored. The hospice, which was built on the site of the monastery of Saint John the Baptist, took in Christian pilgrims travelling to visit the holy sites. To the east of this hospital, separated from it by a lane, a new hospital for pilgrims was built in 1080. Both hospitals remained under the control of the Benedictine abbot. In 1078, Jerusalem was captured by the Seljuk Turks who abused the Christian population, forced pilgrims to pay a heavy tax to visit the Holy Places, and even kidnapped the Patriarch of Jerusalem. In spite of the persecution, the Benedictine hospital continued its ministry. Archbishop John of Amalfi records that during his pilgrimage to Jerusalem in 1082, he visited the hospital. In August 1098, the Turks were ousted by the Egyptian vizier, Al Afdal. Towards the end of the Egyptian occupation (July 1099), the Hospital for Women was being managed by a noble Roman lady, named Agnes, while the Hospital for Men was under the direction of a monk known as Brother Gerard.

=== Crusader period ===
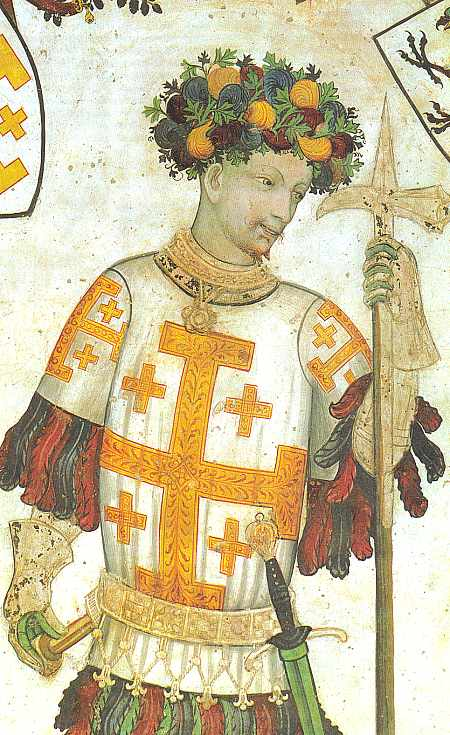
Godfrey of Bouillon, who endowed the hospital in the Muristan after the First Crusade, in a fresco in the Manta Castle

In the First Crusade, during the siege of Jerusalem (1099), the Egyptian governor, Iftikhar ad Dawla, imprisoned Brother Gerard. When Jerusalem fell to Godfrey of Bouillon, he freed Brother Gerard, allowed him to resume his management of the Hospital for Men, and contributed resources to his work. Gerard adopted the policy of receiving all needy patients, irrespective of religion. While the Hospital for Women remained under the control of the Benedictines, Brother Gerard broke off from that Order, adopted the Augustinian rule and organised the Fratres Hospitalarii into a regularly constituted Religious Order under the protection of saint John the Baptist. The members of the Order thus became known as Knights of St. John or Hospitallers.

The formal establishment of the Knights Hospitaller under Brother Gerard was confirmed by a Papal bull of Pope Paschal II in 1113. Gerard acquired territory and revenues for his order throughout the Kingdom of Jerusalem and beyond. His successor, Raymond du Puy de Provence, significantly enlarged the infirmary. The earliest description of the first hospital of the Sovereign Military Order of St. John in Jerusalem was written by a German pilgrim John of Würzburg who visited Jerusalem in about the year 1160:

Over against the Church of the Holy Sepulchre, on the opposite side of the way towards the south, is a beautiful church built in honour of John the Baptist, annexed to which is a hospital, wherein in various rooms is collected together an enormous multitude of sick people. Both men and women. Who are tended and restored to health daily at very great expense. When I was there I learned that the whole number of these sick people amounted to two thousand, of whom sometimes in the course of one day and night more than fifty are carried out dead, while many other fresh ones keep continually arriving. What more can I say? The same house supplies as many people outside it with victuals as it does those inside, in addition to the boundless charity which it daily bestowed upon poor people who beg their bread from door to door and do not lodge in the house, so that the whole sum of its expenses can surely never be calculated even by the managers and stewards thereof. In addition to all these moneys expended upon the sick and upon other poor people, this same house also maintains in its various castles many persons trained to all kinds of military exercises for the defence of the land of the Christians against the invasion of the Saracens.

=== Ayyubid period ===
After the Siege of Jerusalem in October 1187, all Christians were driven out of Jerusalem by Sultan Saladin. The Hospitallers were permitted to leave ten of their number in the city to care for the wounded until they were able to travel. Saladin turned the Hospitallers buildings over to the Mosque of Omar. His nephew in 1216 instituted a lunatic asylum in what had been the conventual church, and it was at this time that the area came to be referred to as the Muristan. The hospital facilities continued to be used for the care of the sick and wounded. The site was deserted in the 16th century, and the magnificent structures eventually fell into ruin.

Muristan is a survival of the longer name of the hospital founded by Saladin after he took control of Jerusalem. Its full name was Salahi Bi-maristan, and it was established some time before 1193 in the center of the Old City adjacent to the older hospital that had been run by the Knights Hospitaller. Additional bimaristans were established in Cairo and Damascus. These clinical and secular-oriented institutions served not only to treat patients, but also as a training space for medical neophytes. The Salahi Bi-maristan in Jerusalem was initially managed by Muwaffaq al-Din Yaqub ibn Siqlab, a well respected Palestinian Melkite doctor who later went on to work for the Ayyubid emir Al-Mu'azzam Isa in Damascus.

=== 19th century ===
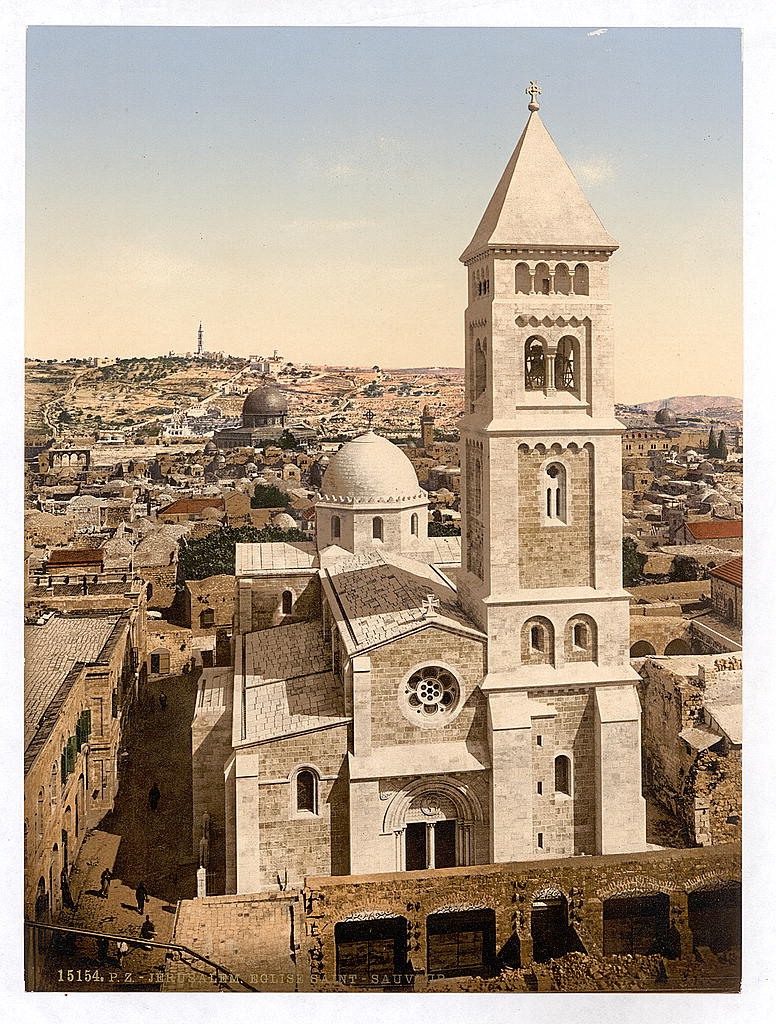
The Church of the Redeemer (Erlöserkirche), in 1900.

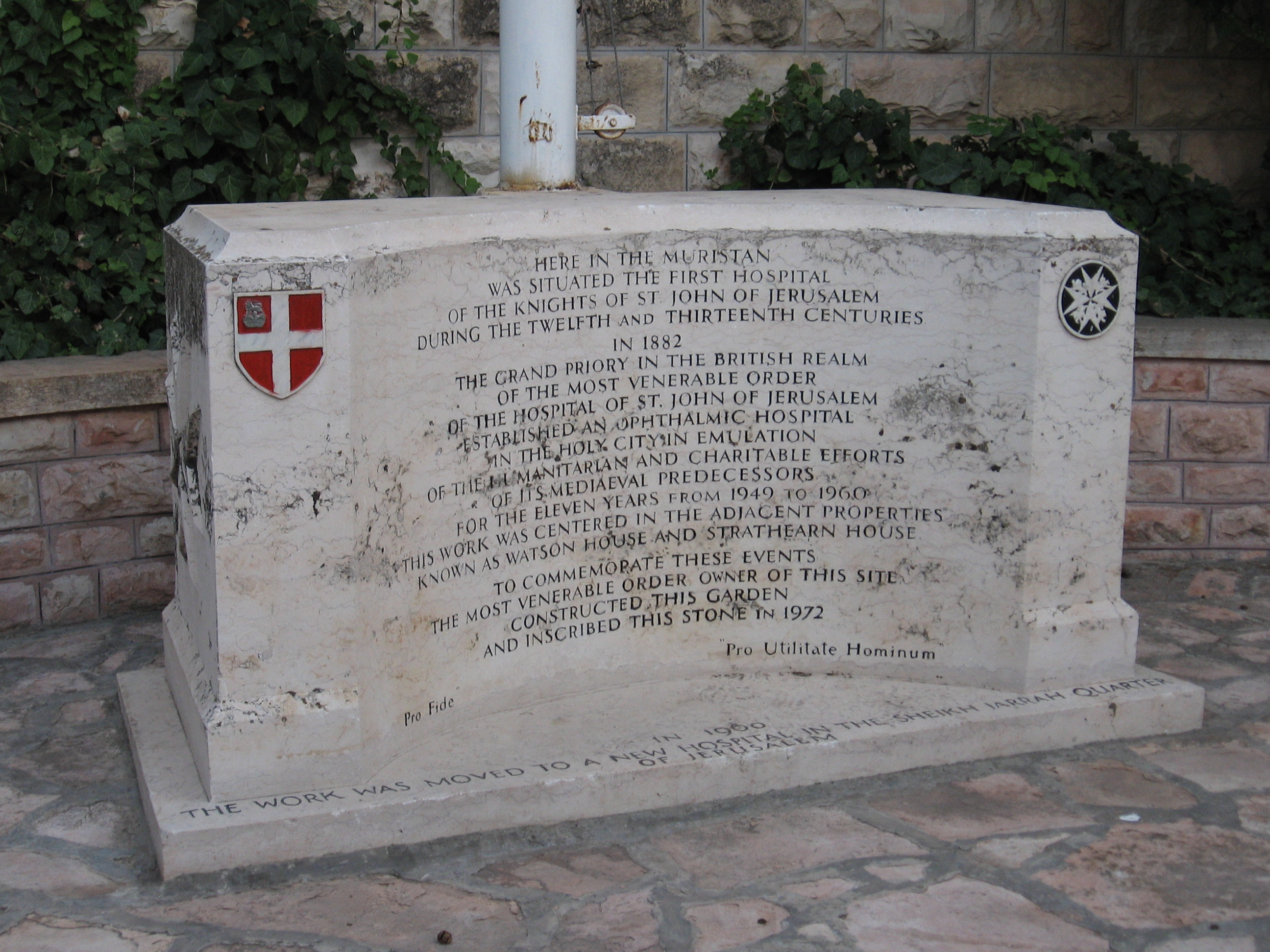
Stone of the memorial in Muristan Street, marking the location of the hospital of the Order of the Knights of St. John.

In 1868, the Sultan Abdulaziz presented the eastern part of this area to Crown Prince Frederick William of Prussia, during his visit to Jerusalem. The prince was at the time the Master of the Johanniterorden, the Protestant successor to a former branch of the Knights Hospitaller. The German knights built a road through the Muristan from north to south, calling it Prince Frederick William Street, and the property became the centre of the German colony in Jerusalem. Beginning in 1841, German Protestant Christians came to Palestine to support the Christian minority in the area through diaconal and missionary work. The German government contributed to the process of removing rubble in the area and rebuilding. In the late 1800s, they rebuilt the Crusader church of St. Mary Latina as the Lutheran Church of the Redeemer (Erlöserkirche). The old cloisters, refectory, and original plan of the medieval church were preserved in the present neo-Romanesque building. Kaiser Wilhelm II personally attended the dedication of the church on 31 October 1898 (Reformation Day), when he and his wife, Augusta Victoria, became the first western rulers to visit Jerusalem. The Church of the Redeemer, under control of the Evangelical Church in Germany (EKD) through the Evangelical Jerusalem Foundation (Evangelische Jerusalemstiftung, EJSt) currently houses the ELCA-sponsored English-speaking congregation, a German-speaking congregation, and an indigenous Arabic-speaking congregation. The church is also the headquarters of the German Propst and the Bishop of the Evangelical Lutheran Church in Jordan (ELCJ).

In order to secure equal representation, in 1868 the Sultan assigned the western part of the Muristan to the Greek Orthodox Patriarchate. It is now occupied by the Greek bazaar, which specializes in leather goods. A ceremonial gateway off of Muristan Street leads to this Muristan area, called Suq Aftimos, and from thence to a set of short intersecting streets with shops and a few cafes. The street arrangements were constructed in 1903 by the Greek Orthodox authority. In the centre of the bazaar area is an ornamental fountain (19th century); at the north end is the Mosque of Omar, built in 1216 by Saladin's son to commemorate Caliph Omar's visit to Jerusalem in 638, when he prayed on the steps of the Church of the Holy Sepulchre instead of inside so that it could remain a Christian holy place.

== Archaeology ==
Excavations of the Muristan were conducted around the start of the 20th century, and showed that the Hospitaller complex occupied an approximately square area measuring 160 yards (east-west) and 143 yards (north-south). In the early decades of the twentieth century little was left of the original buildings. The remains included the Church of Mar Hanna, a series of arches on David Street, and the remains of the north door of the Hospitaller's church of St. Mary Latina, which were incorporated into the modern Church of the Redeemer. What remains of the hospital today is a modern memorial situated in a small recess barred from the street with an iron gate and an enclosed yard.

The "Durch die Zeiten" (lit. "Across Time") archaeological park opened in November 2012, located below the nave of the Church of the Redeemer offers the possibility to commit more than 2000 years of history of the city of Jerusalem by walking through it.
