= Christian Quarter =

One of the four traditional quarters of Jerusalem's Old City

Coordinates: 31°46′42.5″N 35°13′45.84″E

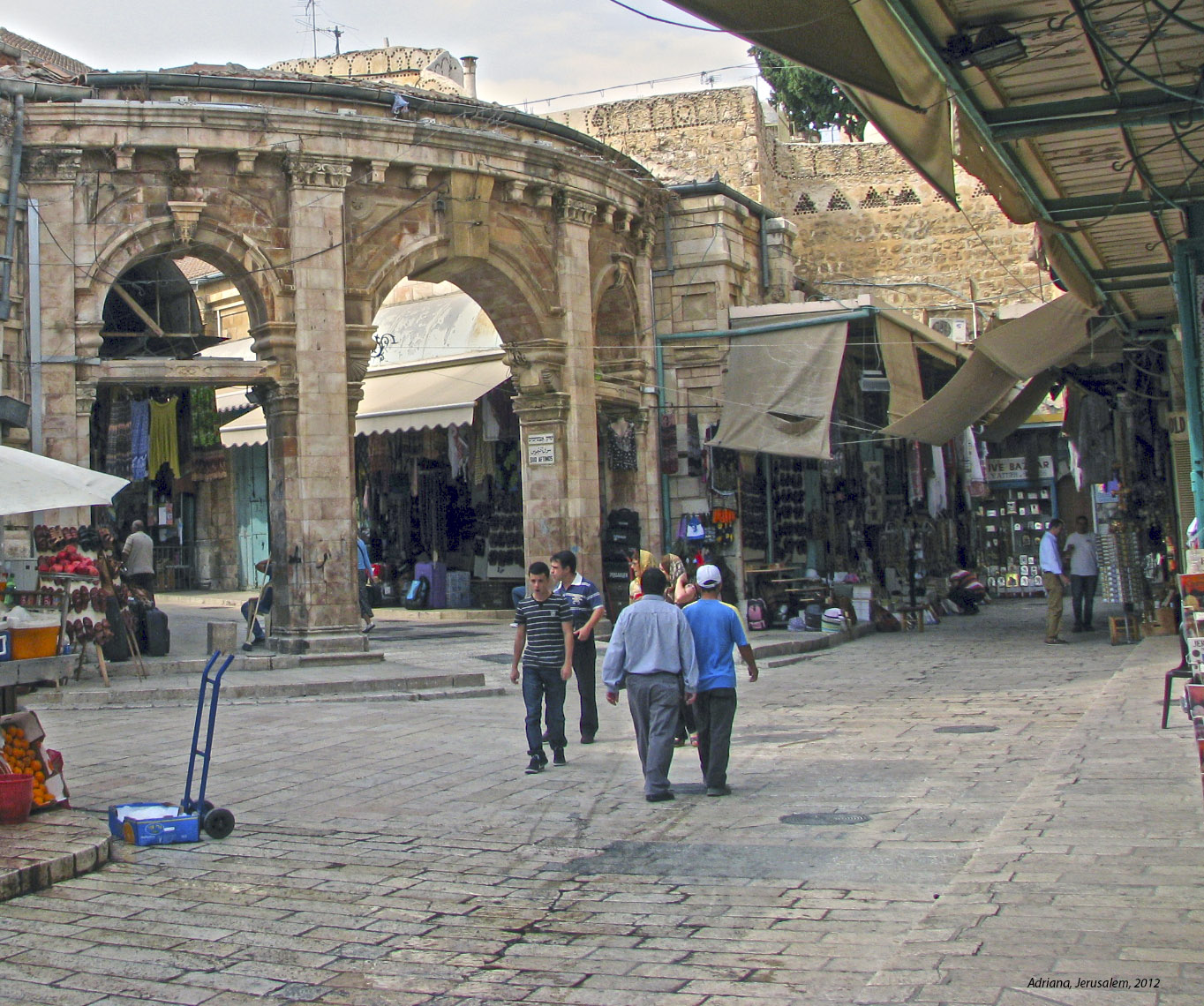
Christian Quarter: Arched entrance to the Muristan, northern access to Suq Aftimos

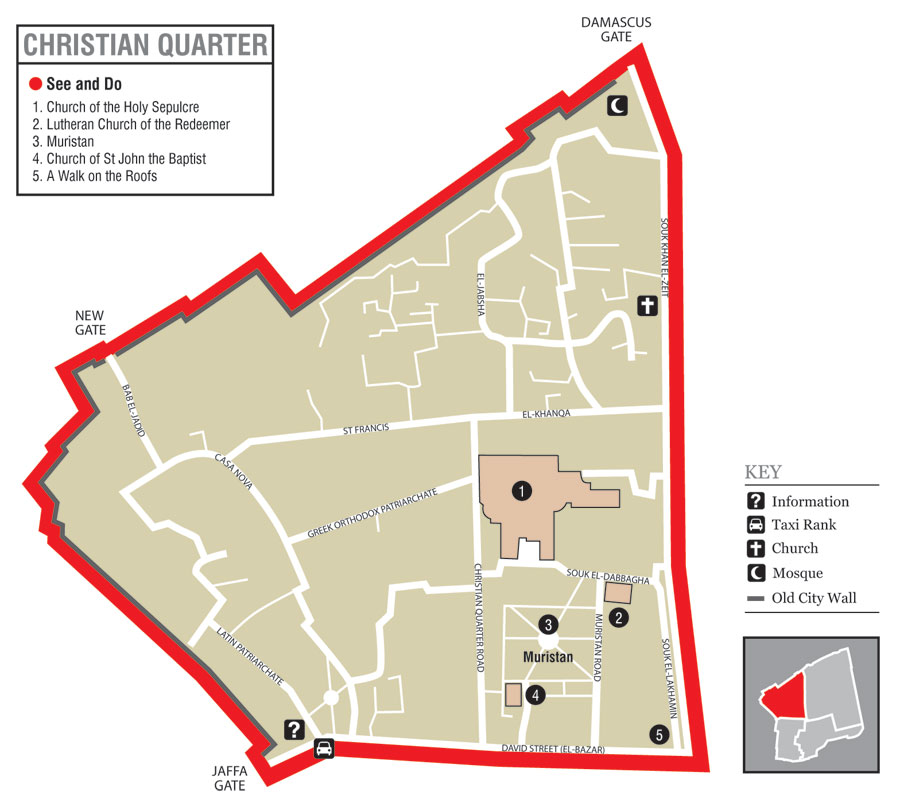
Map of the Christian Quarter

The Christian Quarter (Arabic: حارة النصارى, romanized: Ḥāraṫ al-Naṣārā; Hebrew: הרובע הנוצרי, romanized: Ha-Rova ha-Notsri) is one of the four quarters of the walled Old City of Jerusalem, the other three being the Jewish Quarter, the Muslim Quarter and the Armenian Quarter. The Christian Quarter is situated in the northwestern corner of the Old City, extending from the New Gate in the north, along the western wall of the Old City as far as the Jaffa Gate, along the Jaffa Gate – Western Wall route in the south, bordering on the Jewish and Armenian Quarters, as far as the Damascus Gate in the east, where it borders on the Muslim Quarter.

The Christian Quarter contains roughly 40 Christian holy sites, including the Church of the Holy Sepulchre, commonly considered the holiest site in Christianity. It also serves as the ecclesiastical center for several major Christian denominations in the city. Although the Christian population of the Old City has declined significantly over the past century, Christians still make up a majority of the quarter's residents.

== Description and boundaries ==
The Christian Quarter was built around the Church of the Holy Sepulchre, which is the heart of the quarter, and Christian churches and institutions are spread across much of the quarter. Besides the Church of the Holy Sepulchre, there are the patriarchal seats of many Christian denominations, including the Greek Orthodox Patriarchate of Jerusalem, which owns large tracts of the quarter, the Latin Patriarch of Jerusalem, the Greek Catholic Patriarchate of Jerusalem, the Coptic Patriarchate of Jerusalem and the Ethiopian Patriarchate of Jerusalem, while the Franciscan Monastery of St Saviour (often called by its Italian name, San Salvatore) is the seat of the Custody of the Holy Land.

The west–east David Street and north–south Christian Quarter Road, or simply Christian Road, are the principal market streets. Several hotels, including the Casa Nova Hotel and the Greek Catholic hotel, were built by the churches as places for religious visitors and pilgrims to stay. The quarter also contains museums, including one about the Greek Orthodox Patriarchate. In the southwestern part of the quarter there is a pool called Hezekiah's Pool or Patriarch's Pool that was traditionally used to store water for the area.

The area originated as "Haret en-Nasara" (Nasara is cognate with "Nazarenes") in the middle of the area was later to become the "Christian Quarter". The convention of the boundaries of the Christian Quarter have originated in its current form in the 1841 British Royal Engineers map of Jerusalem, or at least Reverend George Williams' subsequent labelling of it. The city had previously been divided into many more harat (Arabic: حارَة, romanized: Hārat: "quarters", "neighborhoods", "districts" or "areas").

The table below shows the evolution of the area which was to become known as the Christian Quarter, from 1495 up until the modern system:

| | Local divisions | | | | Western divisions | |
| Date | 1495 | 1500s | 1800s | 1900 | 1840s onwards | |
| Source | Mujir al-Din | Ottoman Census | Traditional system | Ottoman Census | Modern maps | |
|---|---|---|---|---|---|---|
| Quarters | Zara'na | Dara'na | Haddadin | Nasara | Christian Quarter | North |
| Quarters | | | Khan ez-Zeyt | Nasara | Christian Quarter | East |
| Quarters | Nasara ("Christian") | | Nasara | Nasara | Christian Quarter | Middle and south |
| Quarters | Nasara ("Christian") | | Mawarna | Nasara | Christian Quarter | Middle and south |
| Quarters | Jawalda | | Jawalda | Nasara | Christian Quarter | West |

== History ==
=== 4th century ===
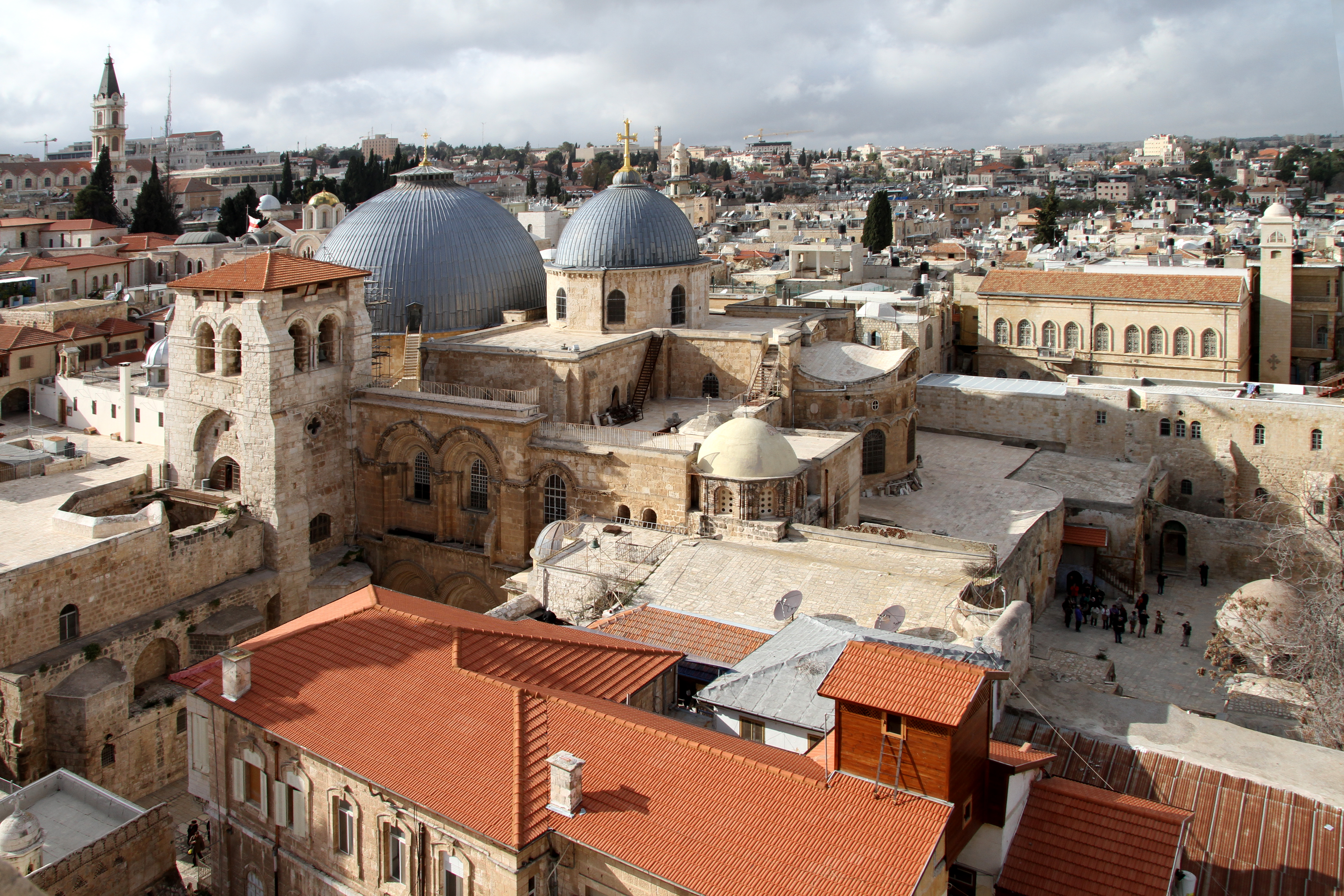
Church of the Holy Sepulchre in the Christian Quarter: Jerusalem is generally considered the cradle of Christianity.

During the 4th century, Emperor Constantine's mother, Helena, journeyed to the Holy Land, aiming to engage in acts of charity and establish churches, particularly in locations associated with significant events in the life of Jesus Christ. During this period, a prominent narrative emerged about Helena's discovery of the cross. This legend, widely recognized in Late Antiquity, is detailed in Jacopo de Varazze's 13th-century Legenda Aurea, which not only recounts the myth surrounding the cross but also commends Helena as an exemplary Christian within the Catholic Church.

According to the legend, while en route to Jerusalem, Helena encountered three crosses, one of which was believed to be the cross of Christ, accompanied by the purported nails. The narrative describes three ailing individuals approaching the crosses, with the third person experiencing a miraculous healing upon touching the cross of Christ. The designated site of this discovery is said to be where the Basilica of the Holy Sepulchre was subsequently erected. Helena is also credited with the establishment of the Church of the Nativity. The cross of Christ and other relics linked to this discovery became subjects of subsequent controversies within the church.

While there, she identified a site in Jerusalem as Calvary, where Jesus was crucified, and the cave where Jesus was laid to rest. As a bold statement for Christianity in this part of the city, she oversaw the construction of the Church of the Holy Sepulchre. Over the centuries, additional religious institutions and churches were erected nearby, forming a community of Christians.

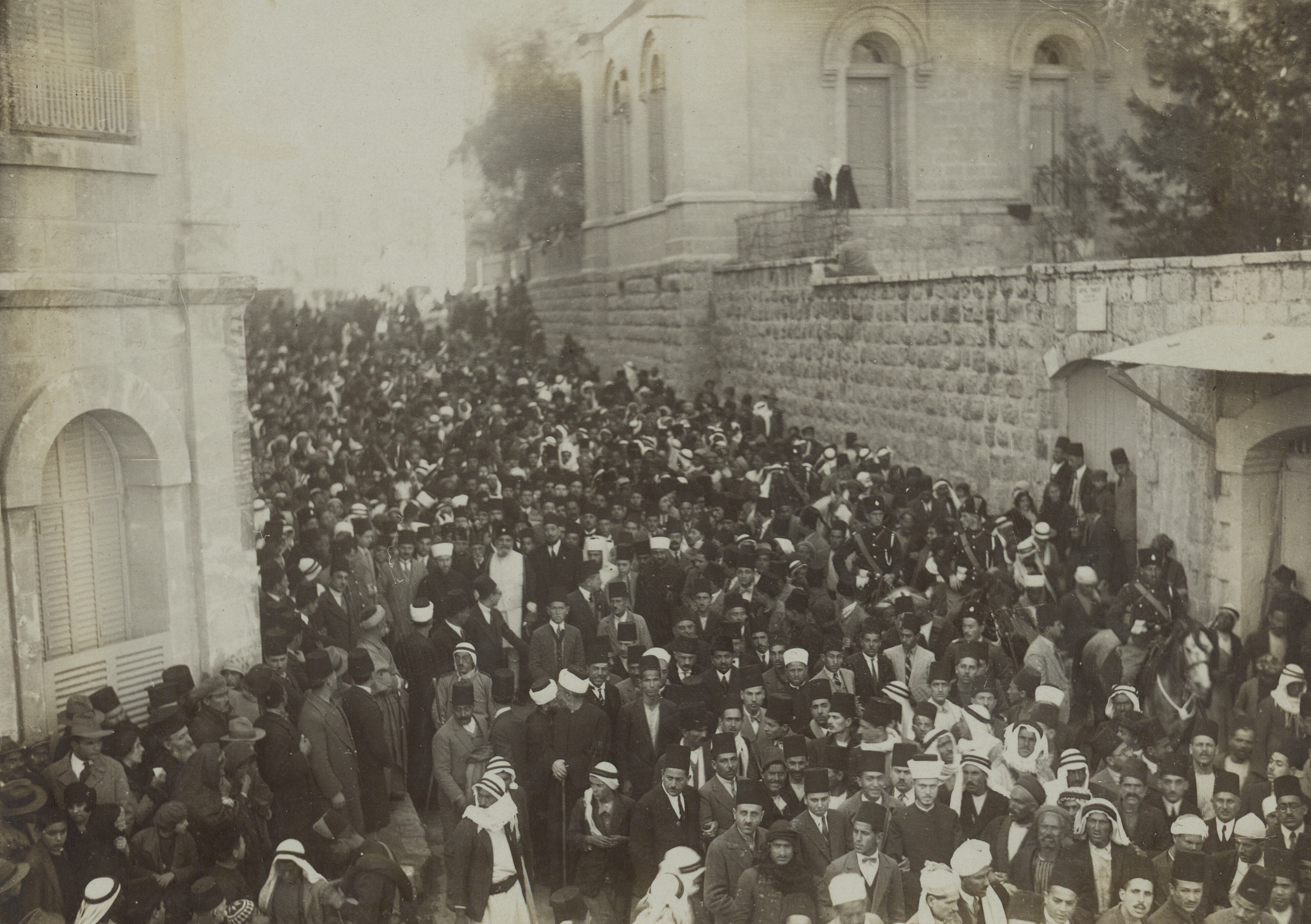
A mass of people in the Christian Quarter during the funeral of the Grand Mufti of Jerusalem Kamil al-Husayni, 1921

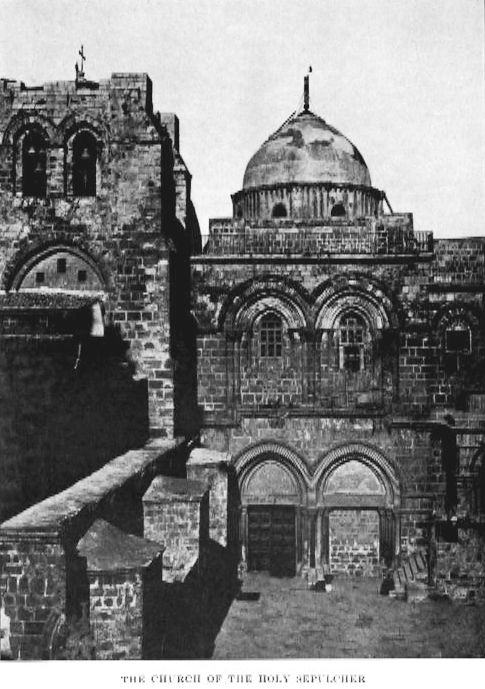
Church of the Holy Sepulchre (1885). Other than some restoration work, it appears essentially the same today.

=== 19th century ===
In the 19th century, European countries sought to expand their influence in Jerusalem and began constructing several structures in the Christian Quarter. The Ottoman authorities attempted to halt European influence and established rules for buying land in the area, but personal interventions from the heads of those countries, including Wilhelm II of Germany and Franz Joseph of Austria, led to construction of some buildings for those countries' religious and secular authorities.

At the end of the 19th century, there was no further free land for development in the Christian Quarter. In the same period, the Suez Canal had opened and many Christians travelled to the Holy Land. This led to intensified competition between the European powers for influence in Jerusalem. France built hospitals, a monastery, and hostels for visitors outside the Old City adjacent to the Christian Quarter – an area which became known as the French area. The Russians located themselves in the nearby Russian Compound.

There was a natural desire for easy travel between the Christian Quarter and the new development, but at the time the Old City walls formed a barrier and travellers were forced to take an indirect path through either Jaffa Gate or Nablus Gate. In 1889, the Ottomans accepted the request of the European countries and breached a new gate in the Old City walls, in the area of the new development. The gate was called the New Gate.

== Landmarks ==
=== Churches ===
- Church of the Holy Sepulchre
- Cathedral of Our Lady of the Annunciation (Melkite Greek Catholic church)
- Co-Cathedral of the Most Holy Name of Jesus (Latin Catholic)
- Church of the Redeemer (Lutheran)
- Church of St John the Baptist (Greek Orthodox)

=== Monasteries ===
- Deir es-Sultan (Coptic)
- Monastery of Saint Saviour (Franciscan)

=== Mosques ===
- Mosque of Omar (Mamluk)
- Al-Khanqah al-Salahiyya Mosque (Mamluk) at the site of the Crusader palace of the Latin Patriarch

=== Businesses ===
Many of the streets function as typical oriental bazaars or suqs, with the David Street and Christian Quarter Road most prominent among them.

- Suq Aftimos (19th century) covers much of the Muristan quarter
- Razzouk Tattoo

== Relation to Armenian Quarter ==
Though formally separate from the main bulk of the Christian Quarter, which houses mostly Greek Orthodox and Roman Catholic sites, the Armenians consider their adjacent Armenian Quarter to be part of the Christian Quarter. The three Christian patriarchates of Jerusalem – the Greek Orthodox Patriarchate, the Latin Patriarchate of Jerusalem, and the Armenian Patriarchate of Jerusalem – as well as the government of Armenia, have all publicly expressed their opposition to any political division of the two quarters. The central reasons for the existence of a separate Armenian Quarter is the distinct language and culture of the Armenians, who, unlike the majority of Christians in Jerusalem, Israel and Palestine, are neither Arab nor Palestinian. (Note: "Apart from their miaphysite views there is no reason why the Armenian community should not live happily with the other groups in the Christian Quarter. Yet, David Street is a dividing line of more than just theological significance, for the Armenians with their separate language and culture from the Arabs also have an almost exclusively commercial economic basis. Apart from the comparatively close relations between the Syrian Orthodox Community and the Armenians for theological reasons, the Armenians have preferred to separate themselves from Arabs of all faiths." "The difference, as I see it, is that by and large most of the Christian communities here are Palestinian ethnically, whereas the Armenians have their own ethnic identity as Armenians, and that is where in some sense they stand out or differ.")
