= Ethiopia Street =

Street in Jerusalem, Israel

- Abyssinian street, Habashim Street
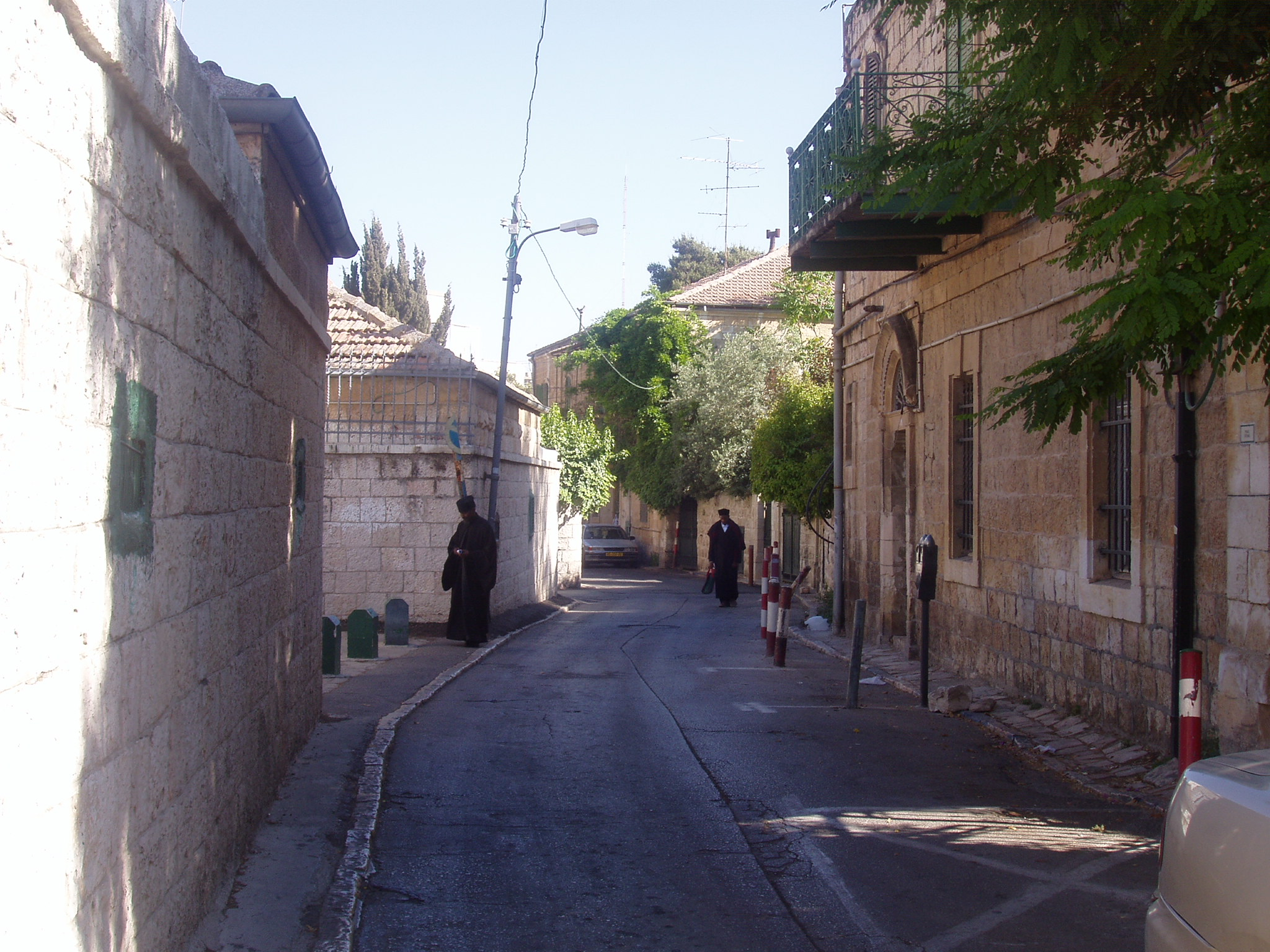

Ethiopia Street (during the British Mandate period and even afterwards: Abyssinian street or Habashim Street) is a street in the center of Jerusalem, branching off from HaNevi'im Street, and parallel to the nearby B'nai B'rith Street.

== The Uniqueness of the Street ==
Ethiopia Street is an extension of Street of the Prophets and together they form an axis that connects the east of the city with its west, the old city with the new city, and the secular city with the ultra-Orthodox city. This traffic axis constitutes a historical, architectural, and religious complex with unique characteristics and embodies an important part of the chronology and essence of the city's construction. The traffic axis of Prophets Street begins at Damascus Gate in the old city, from where it ascends westward until it connects with Jaffa Street at Davidka Square. Approximately in its middle, Ethiopia Street branches off northward. The pedestrian walking along the street up the traffic axis sees unique historical evidence of 19th-century and early 20th-century architecture. Ethiopia Street contains institutions and residential buildings that together create an exceptional urban fabric.

== Historical Background ==
The connection of Ethiopia Street to Prophets Street, which serves as a central traffic artery into the western part of the city, naturally turned the entire area into one of the first development and construction zones outside the walls. During the Ottoman period, the street was nothing more than a dirt path, but with the British conquest of Jerusalem in 1917, a development boom began, from which the small street also benefited. Construction on Ethiopia Street began in the 19th century by representatives of Ethiopian Emperor Menelik II. Menelik's wife, Taitu Betul, and his senior minister, Ras Makonnen, built more than a dozen buildings in what began to be called "Habashim Street." Two buildings that serve as landmarks of Ethiopian construction on Ethiopia Street and the entire area are Kidane Mehret - the Ethiopian Church, and the Ethiopian Consulate building on Prophets Street, which was established in 1928.

=== The Ethiopian Community ===
Christian Ethiopians have a deep connection to Jerusalem. The Christian church belongs to the Oriental Orthodox branch of Christianity. According to the belief of the Ethiopian Orthodox Church, Ethiopia is the new Zion, and the Ethiopian royal family, according to the national ethos, belongs to the seed of King Solomon.

Ethiopian monks probably resided in Jerusalem as early as the fifth century. Initially, they resided within the Church of the Holy Sepulchre but were expelled from there and founded the Deir al-Sultan Monastery adjacent to the Church of the Holy Sepulchre. In 1884, at the initiative of Emperor Yohannes, the construction of the Kidane Mehret Church (Covenant of Mercy) began on a plot called Debre Genet (Mount of Paradise), in the center of the Ethiopian compound adjacent to Prophets Street. In 1930, when Ras Tafari Haile Selassie was crowned Emperor of Ethiopia, the ties between the Ethiopian monarchy and Jerusalem were strengthened. In 1936, Ethiopia was conquered by Mussolini's army and was under Italian control until 1941. Selassie himself fled with the conquest and arrived in Jerusalem, as well as in Geneva, to speak before the League of Nations. After about three months in Jerusalem, he moved to England. The Ethiopian community in Jerusalem was a humiliated and oppressed community for hundreds of years. Its exit outside the walls and the foothold it gained in the new city and on Ethiopia Street marked the intensification of religious feelings in the renewed Ethiopia and among the community's representatives in the country.

=== The Street Name ===
Initially, the entire area was named after the community - the Habashim neighborhood. The street name was determined at the end of the 19th century when the Ethiopian Church was built on the street, and during the Mandate period, the street was named Abyssinian Street, the Latin name of the country known as Habash (and in a distorted form, Abys). Since the name Habash - which originates from Arabic and means "a mixture of tribes" - was considered a name that does not include all Ethiopian citizens but only the Semitic-speaking citizens, the street name was changed in December 1968 to Ethiopia Street.

== Notable buildings ==
=== Ethiopia 1 / HaNevi'im 58 - Tabor House ===
Tabor House was inaugurated in 1889 as the residence of German archaeologist and architect Conrad Schick (1822–1902). Above the entrance to the house, Schick, a Protestant, inscribed the name THABOR inspired by Book of Psalms (Chapter 89, Verse 13): "The north and the south, thou hast created them: Tabor and Hermon shall rejoice in thy name." The house's style combines German architecture with Eastern motifs. The house is surrounded by a Jerusalem stone wall with an entrance gate reminiscent of a German medieval fortress gate, complete with a small watchtower. Since 1951, the place has been used by the Swedish Theological Institute.

=== Ethiopia 8 - Emperor Menelik II House ===
House number 8 was built at the initiative of Emperor Menelik II of Ethiopia as a rental apartment building, with the income intended to finance the church and Ethiopian activities in Jerusalem. In 1907, a home for poor Jewish girls was established in the building, the first of its kind in Jerusalem. In the 1950s, the family of poet Yehuda Amichai rented an apartment in the building.

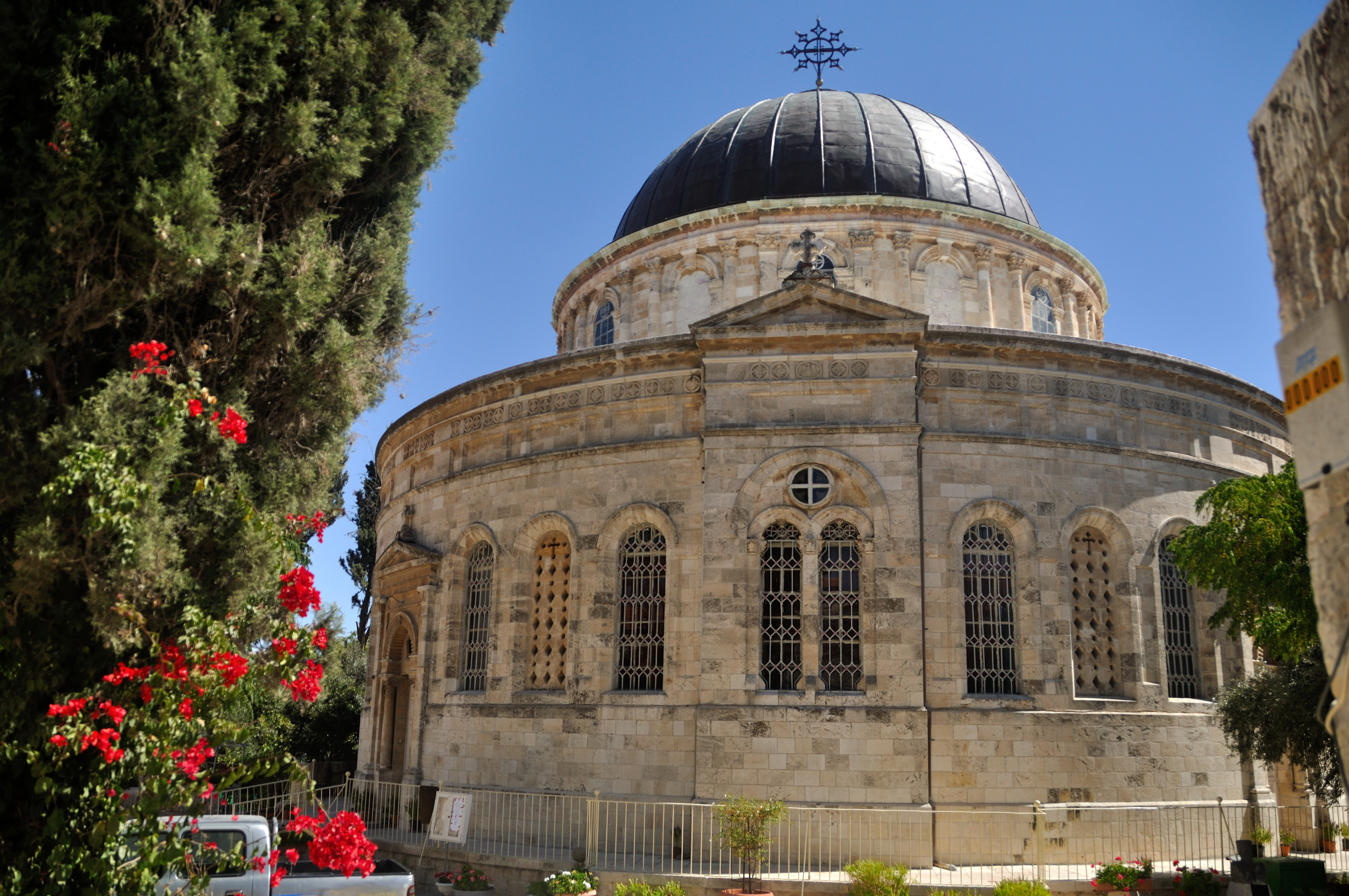
Ethiopia 10 - Kidana Mehret - The Ethiopian Church

=== Ethiopia 10 - Kidane Mehret Ethiopian Church ===
House number 10 on the street is a round church called the Kidane Mehret Church, (Covenant of Mercy), located in a closed compound along with the Debre Genet Monastery (Monastery of Paradise; in Ge'ez script: ደብረ ገነት) of the Ethiopian Orthodox Church. It was built by Emperor Yohannes IV of Ethiopia (reigned 1872–1889) starting in 1882 and inaugurated in 1893 during the reign of his successor Menelik II. The church is built in the style of Ethiopian churches, with a round shape and the Holy of Holies located in the center of the church.

=== Ethiopia 3 - Feigenbaum's House ===
At house number 3 lived Aryeh Feigenbaum, a pioneer of ophthalmology in Israel. In 1916, Feigenbaum rented a two-story house from the Nashashibi family. The Feigenbaum family lived on the upper floor, while Feigenbaum's clinic operated on the lower floor mostly as a private clinic, but for a time, it was shared by four ophthalmologists with the same first name, 'Aryeh', who were nicknamed "the four lions" Feigenbaum, Bahem, Goldberg, and Shimoni-Makler. In 1962, Feigenbaum purchased the house from the Custodian of Absentee Property and continued to live there until his death.

=== Ethiopia 5 - Consulate Residence ===
The consulates of Norway, Sweden, and Spain during the Mandate period were located at Ethiopia Street 5.

=== Ethiopia 9 - Ruppin and Mordechai Ben Hillel's House ===
House number 9 was the residence of Arthur Ruppin. Additionally, the writer Mordechai Ben-Hillel Hacohen, a leader of the Lovers of Zion movement, who was a relative of Yitzhak Rabin's mother, also lived there. Rabin spent some of his early days in this house.
