= Street of the Prophets =

Thoroughfare in Jerusalem

Coordinates: 31°47′02″N 35°13′24″E

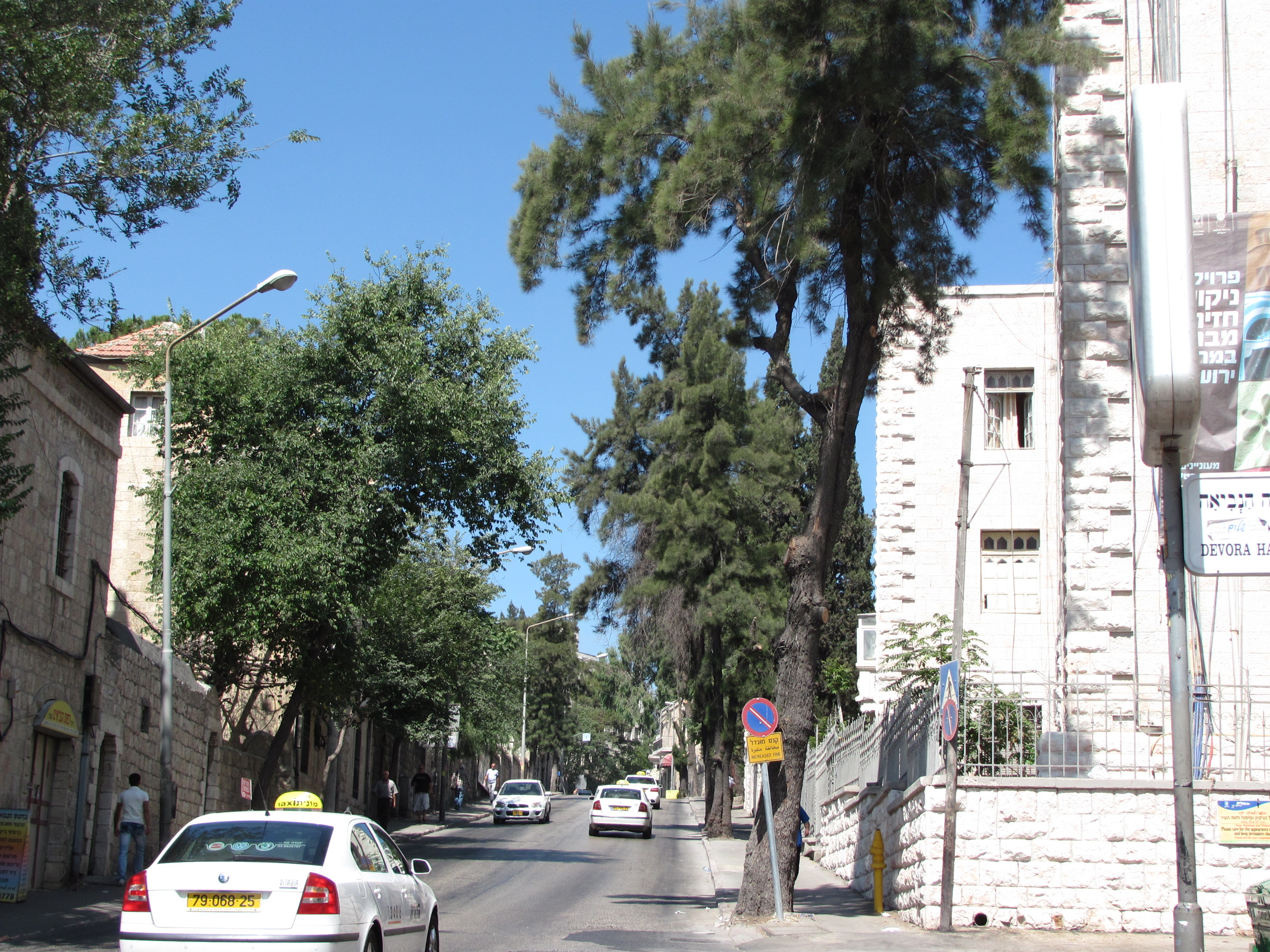
View looking west on Street of the Prophets.

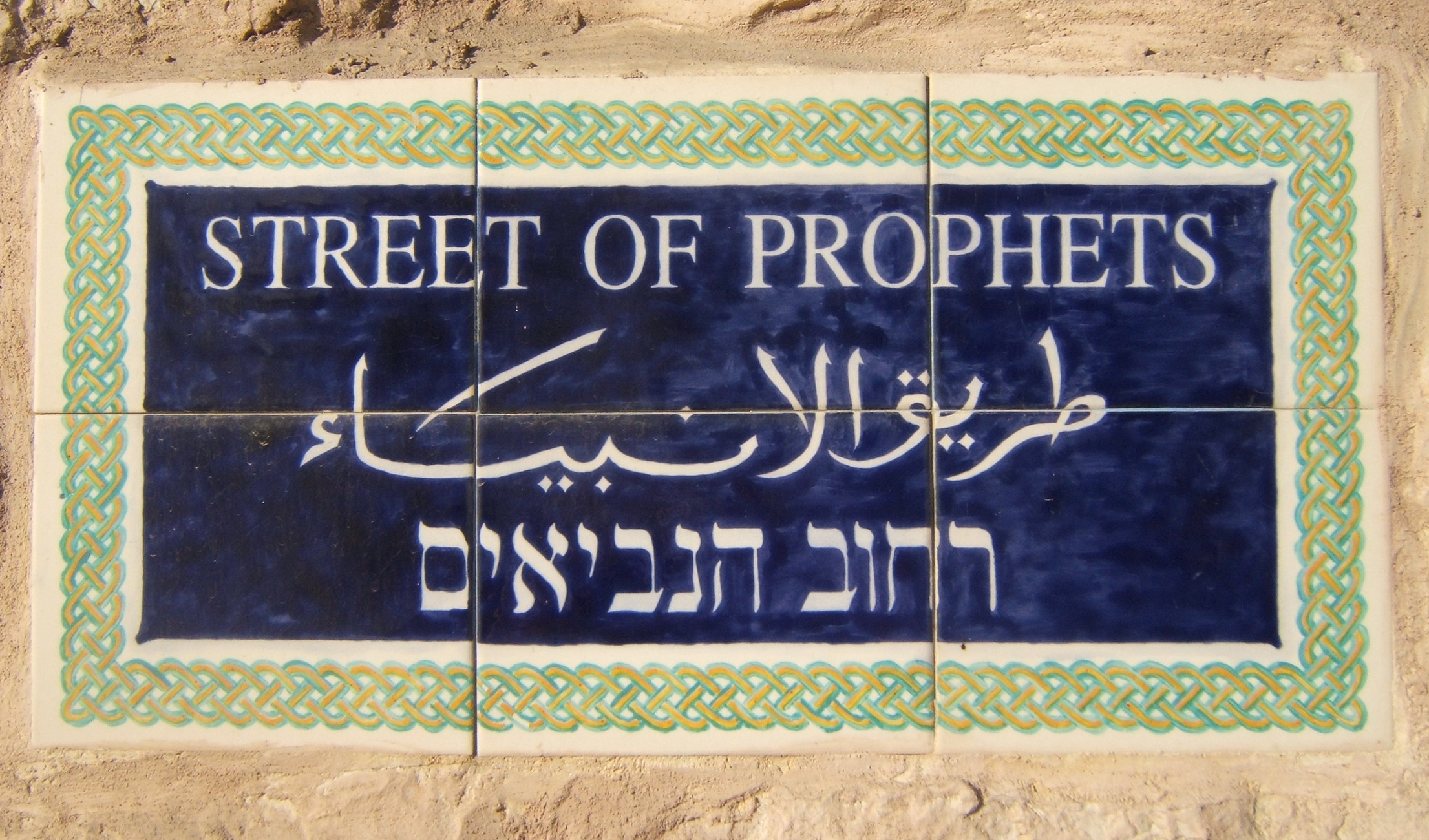
Street sign from the British Mandate era.

Street of the Prophets (Hebrew: רחוב הנביאים, Rehov HaNevi'im) is an east–west axis road in Jerusalem beginning outside Damascus Gate and ending at Davidka Square. Located to the north of Jaffa Road, it bisects the neighborhood of Musrara.

During its heyday in the late 19th century and early 20th century, Street of the Prophets was a favorite address for hospitals, churches, monasteries, hospices, government offices, foreign consulates, and wealthy Christian, Jewish and Muslim residents.

Today the street still boasts the same heterogeneous mix of residents and workers, as well as schools, hospitals, churches and government offices. The elegant 19th-century architecture gives Street of the Prophets the appellation of "most beautiful street outside the Old City", while its historic buildings make it the most popular site for guided tours outside the Old City.

== Etymology ==
The Street of the Prophets was established during the expansion of Jerusalem beyond the walls of the Old City in the mid-19th century. In the beginning, the street did not have a name. It was known as:

- "Street of the Hospitals" – due to the many hospitals, Christian and Jewish, situated along its route;
- "Street of the Consuls" – due to the many foreign consulates that opened offices here.

The street was officially named at the beginning of the British Mandate period by the Governor of Jerusalem, Ronald Storrs. At that time, the street was paved and infrastructure for water and electricity were installed.

According to one opinion, the street was named for the prophets of Israel, many of whom prophesied in Jerusalem. Another opinion holds that the street was named for the prophets of Judaism, Christianity and Islam, since the tomb of Nebi Akasha in the nearby Zikhron Moshe neighborhood was traditionally viewed as the burial site of prophets of the three monotheistic faiths.

== Pre-1948 hospitals and Christian missions ==
Early on, Street of the Prophets was a popular address for hospitals, often run by confessional organisations. In the mid-19th century, the hospitals that were located in the Old City were forced to move due to high population density and difficult sanitary conditions. Each hospital re-established itself on Street of the Prophets to maintain its proximity to the residents still residing in the Old City.

Street of the Prophets was also home to Christian missions. The most prominent was the London Jews' Society mission headquartered at the western end of the street (now the Anglican International School campus). This 32-dunam site housed and employed hundreds of impoverished Jewish immigrants from Russia in the 1880s (see below under "English Hospital"). The hospitals run by Christian missionary organizations offered free medical care to attract Jewish patients for the purposes of missionizing. This practice was decried by the rabbis of the era, who issued a cherem against Jews who used these health services. Despite rabbinical opposition, many Jews continued to turn to Christian missionary hospitals for medical care.

The hospitals established on Street of the Prophets in the late 19th century and early 20th century included:

- Marienstift Children's Hospital (#29), opened in 1872 by Dr. Max Sandreczky
- Italian Hospital (#34), the creation of Giulio and Antonio Barluzzi. The project was started in 1912 and the complex, containing a hospital and a church, opened in 1919.

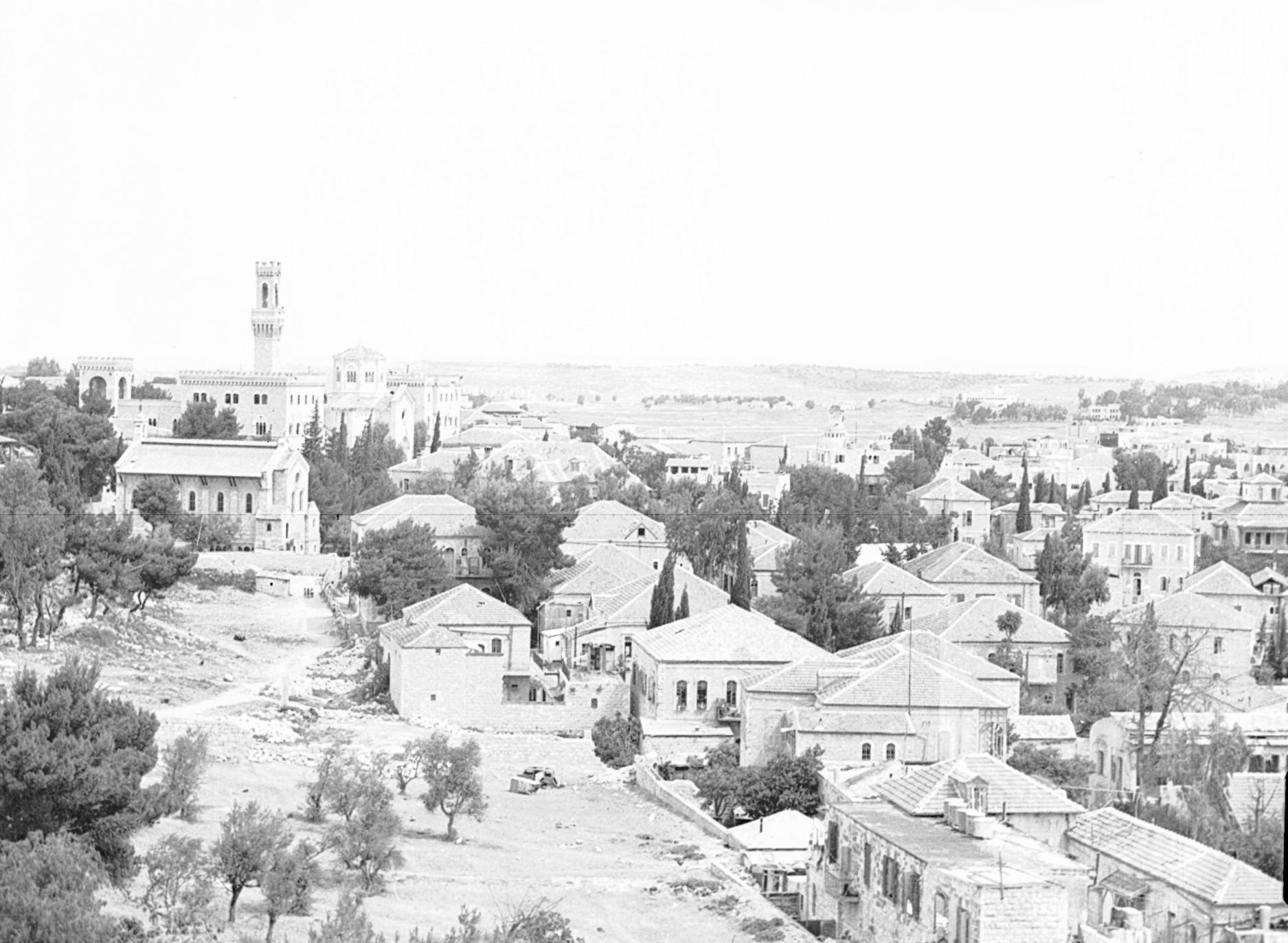
The Italian Hospital compound (left) overlooking the neighborhood of Musrara, circa 1950.

- Meyer Rothschild Hospital (#37), the first Jewish hospital outside the Old City, built by Baron James Rothschild in 1888 and named after his father

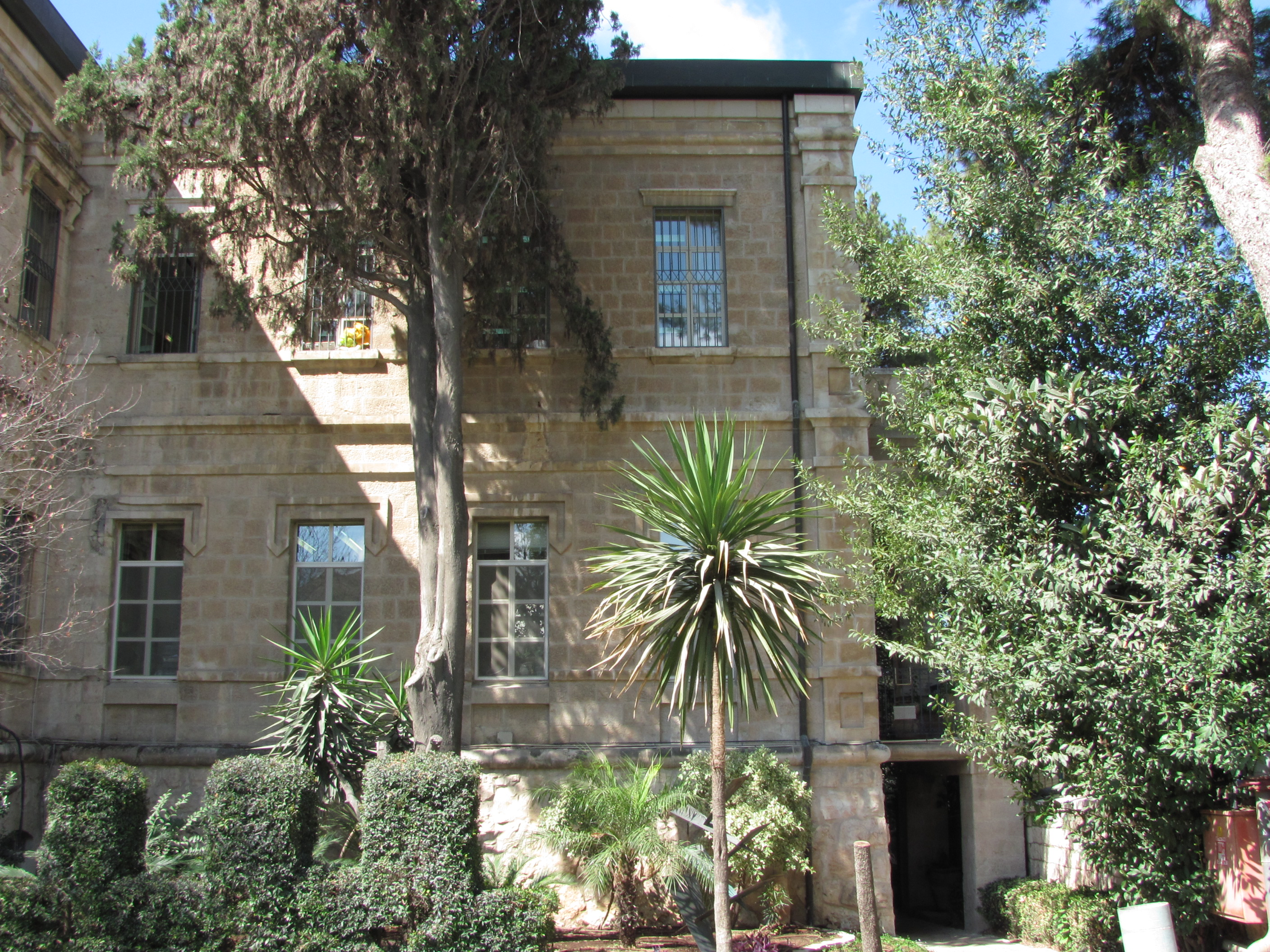
Garden view of Meyer Rothschild Hospital.

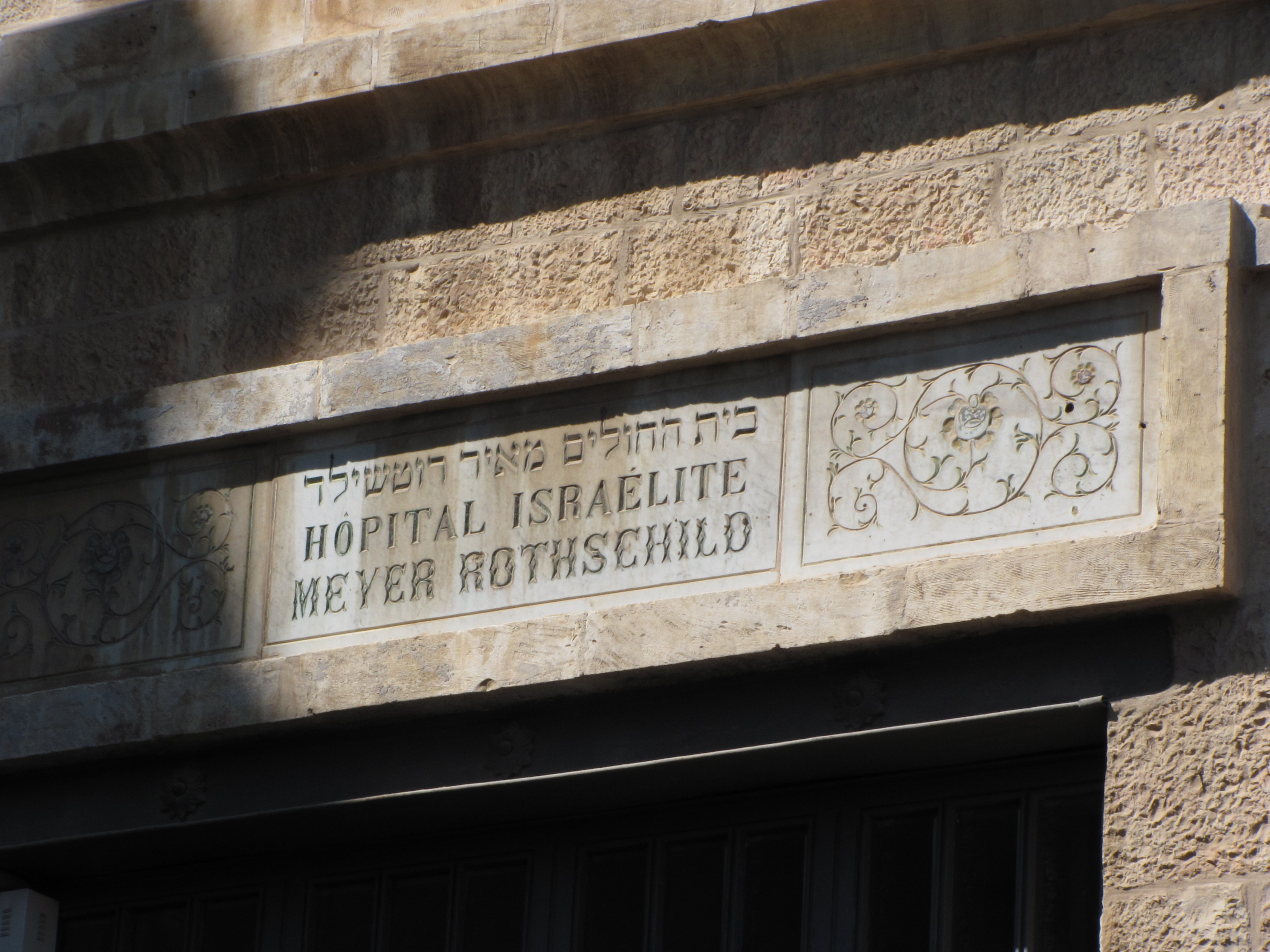
Meyer Rothschild Hospital, inscription on door lintel

- German Deaconess Hospital (#49, corner with Straus St.), opened in 1894. After 1948 it was taken over by Bikur Cholim Hospital as the "Ziv Building".

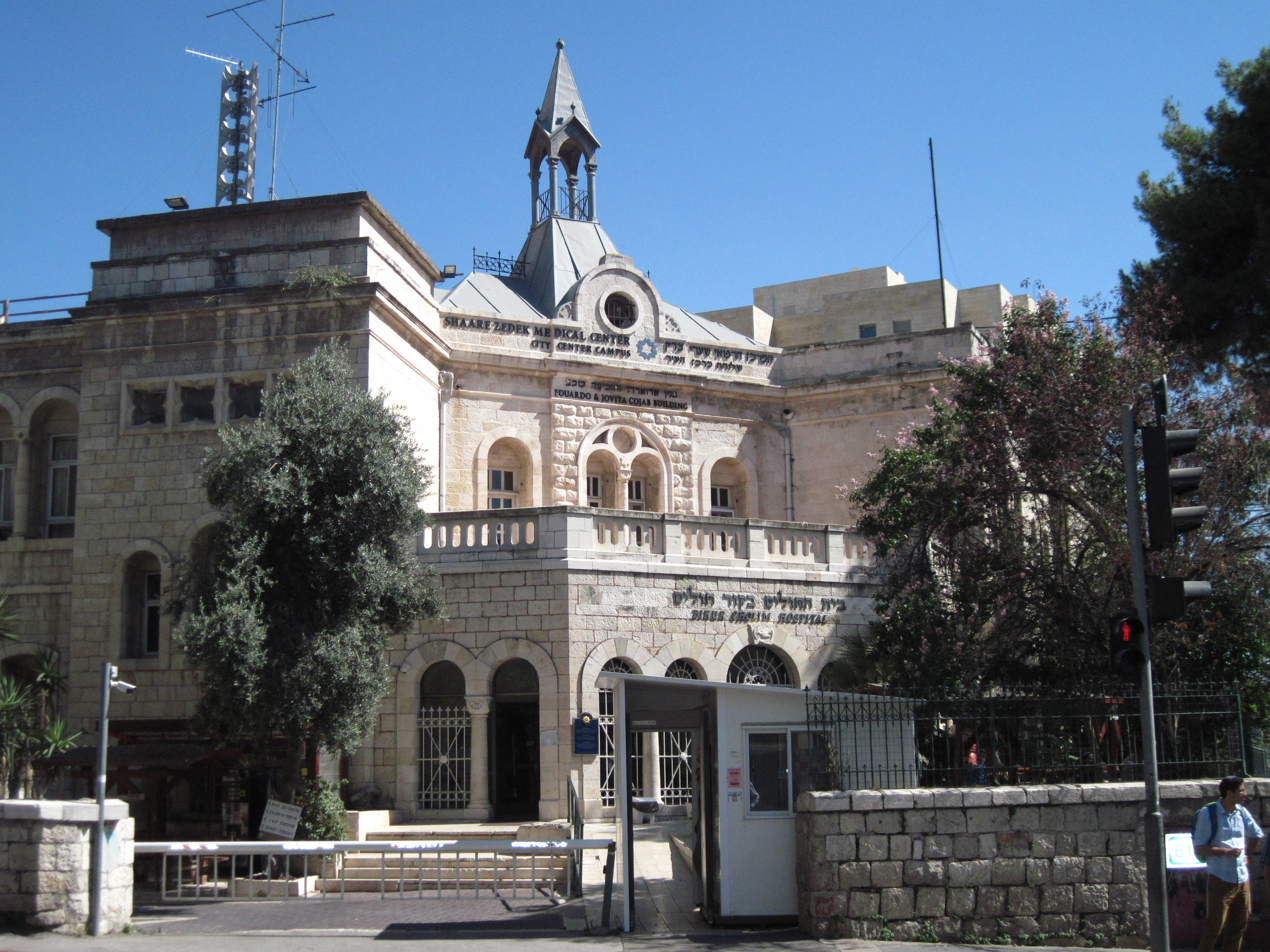
Former German Deaconess Hospital, later part of Bikur Cholim Hospital

- Bikur Cholim Hospital (#53), built in 1910, ran by Shaare Zedek Medical Center from 2012, and closed around 2020.
- English Hospital (former), now Anglican School (#82). The hospital was opened in 18966 by the London Society for Promoting Christianity Among the Jews. Across the street and a bit further north is a modern hotel, built where the English Mission had opened a sanatorium in 1862.

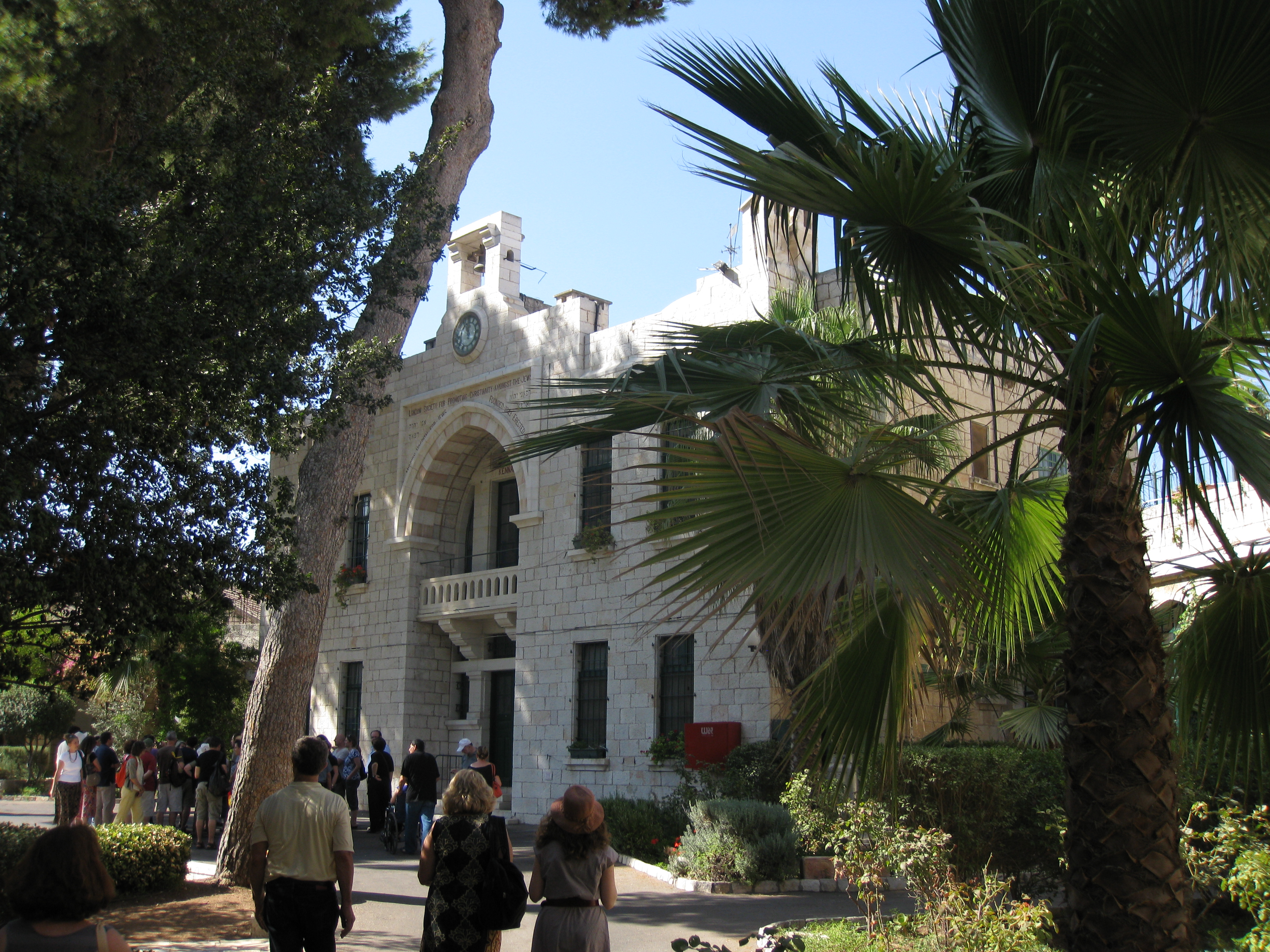
The English Mission Hospital, today part of the Anglican International School campus.

== Government offices and consulates ==
- Pasha's House (#61), built by the Greek Orthodox Church and rented out to the Ottoman governors of Jerusalem.
- The German consulate once stood beside the International Evangelical Church on the site of present-day Raoul Wallenberg Street. It was attacked by the Israeli underground when it flew a flag with a swastika in 1933, and was subsequently destroyed by the underground.
- The U.S. Consulate General, founded in the Old City in 1844, relocated to an address near the beginning of Street of the Prophets in the late 19th century. In 1912, it moved to its present address on Agron Street.
- Ethiopian Consulate (#38–40), built by Empress Zewditu I of Ethiopia in 1928; it housed that country's consulate from 1948 to 1973.

== Hotels ==
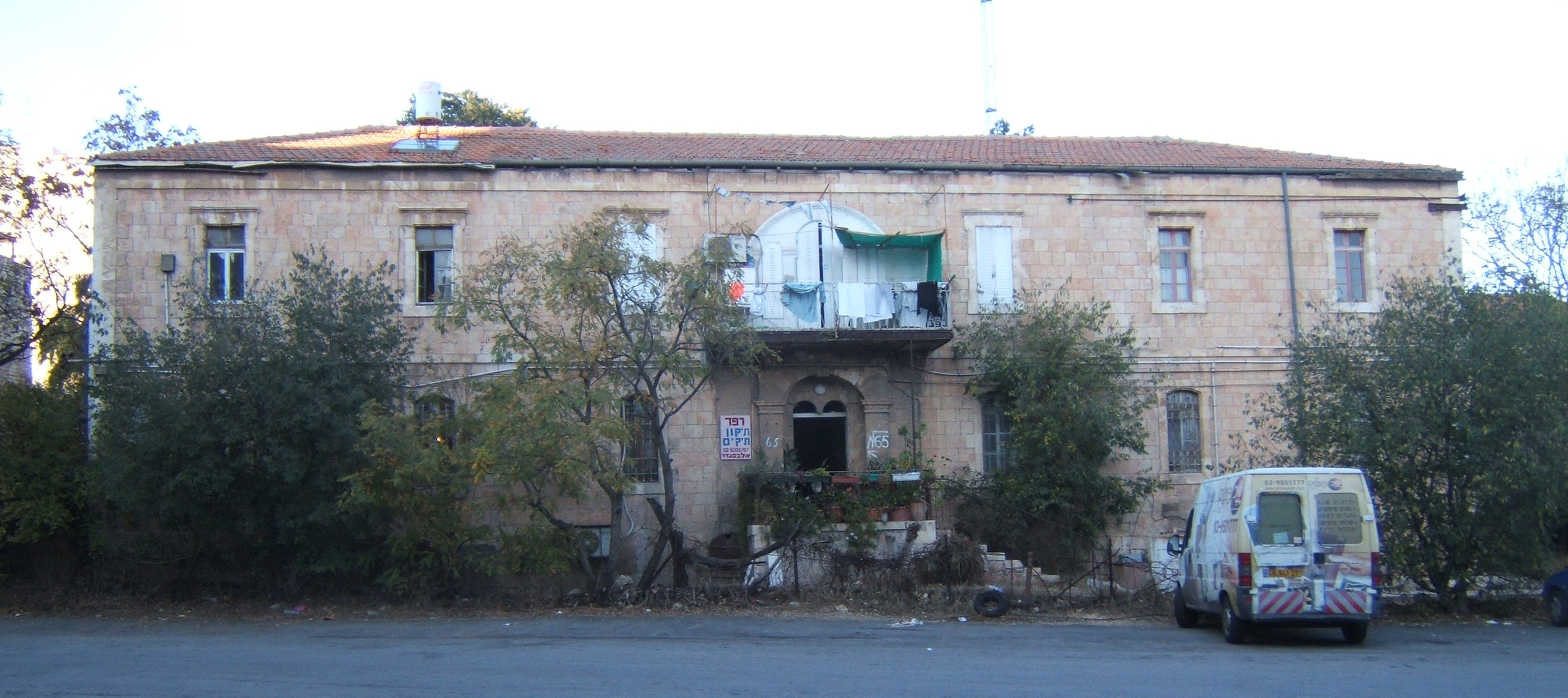
Present-day exterior of the Kamenitz Hotel.

- Kamenitz Hotel (#65), built in 1878, was a five-star hotel with a carriage entrance from Jaffa Road.
- San Remo Hotel (#70), built in 1927, occupied the three-story building on the northeast corner of Street of the Prophets and Straus Street, opposite Bikur Holim Hospital.

== Private homes ==
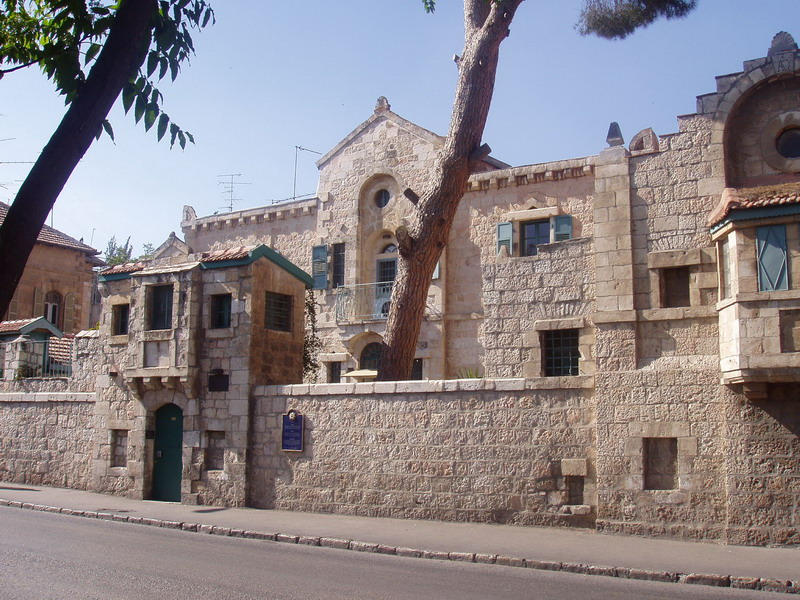
Tabor House, home of architect Conrad Schick, now occupied by the Swedish Theological Institute

Unlike other areas outside the Old City which were exclusively Jewish, Christian or Arab, the Street of the Prophets was a heterogeneous zone. Ottoman and, later, British officials; foreign consuls and well-to-do residents all lived here, creating a cultural and social center.

Notable residents of the street include:

- "Thabor House" (#58), the home of Conrad Schick, German Protestant missionary and architect who designed and/or built several of the buildings on the street, including his own.
- Navon Bey House (#59) was the residence of Joseph Navon, a Jewish businessman and with Johannes Frutiger initiator of the Jaffa–Jerusalem railway, from whom the former bought the house in 1885.
- Hunt residence (#64), built in 1869 by English painter William Holman Hunt. Later tenants included Dr. Helena Kagan, Jerusalem's first pediatrician. Hebrew poet Rachel lived in the small white house in the courtyard in 1925 and wrote a poem inspired by a pear tree Hunt planted in the courtyard.

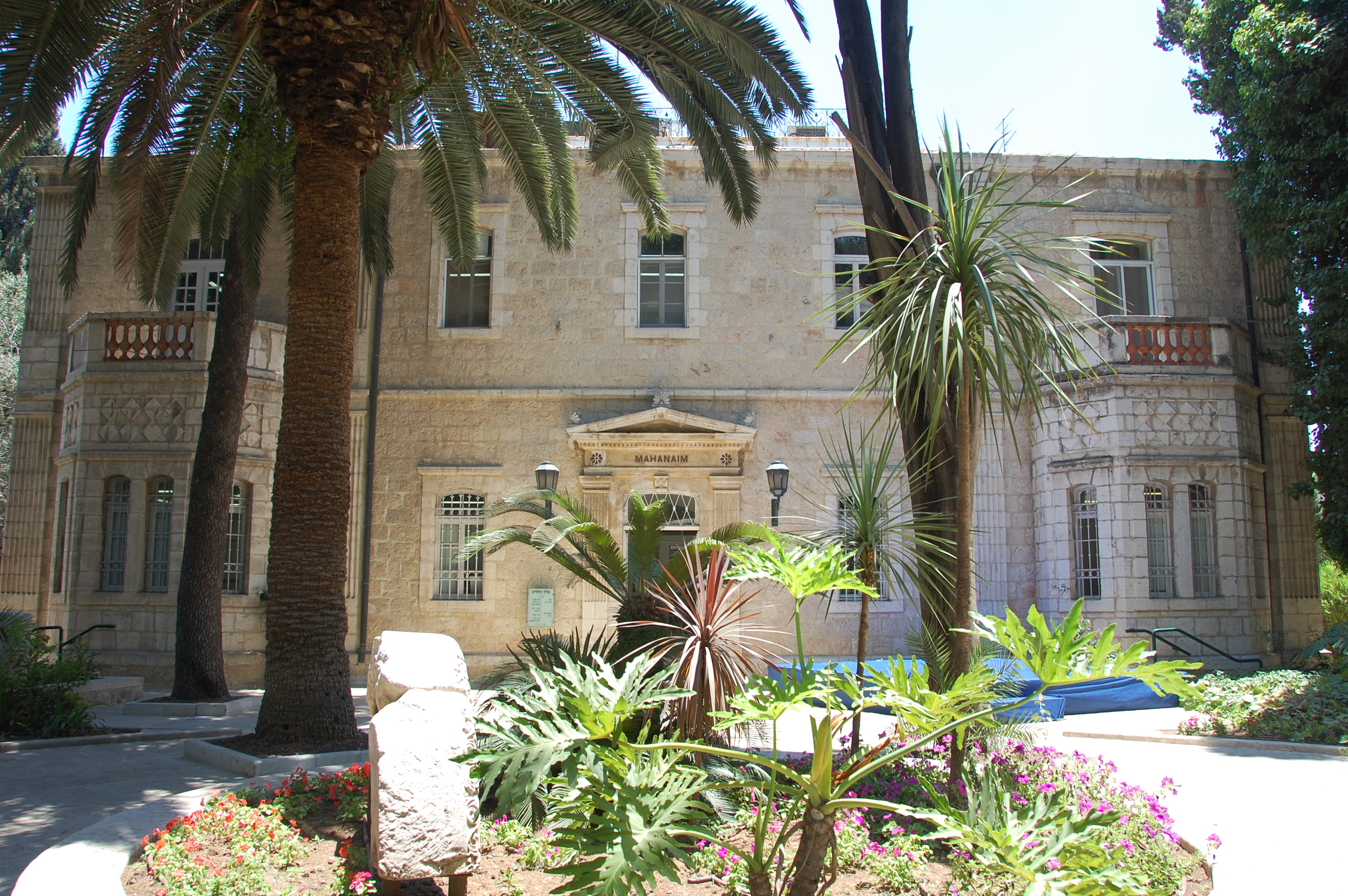
Mahanaim House.

- "Mahanaim" (34, Shivtei Yisrael Street and Street of the Prophets), built in 1885 by Johannes Frutiger, a Swiss banker, who named this second home of his after a verse in Genesis (Gen 32:2). His family was later forced to sell the mansion; it was later occupied, in turn, by the Evelina de Rothschild School, Menachem Ussishkin, director of the Jewish National Fund, and Lord Herbert Plumer, High Commissioner during the Mandate period. Today it houses offices of the Israeli Ministry of Education.

== Various communities ==
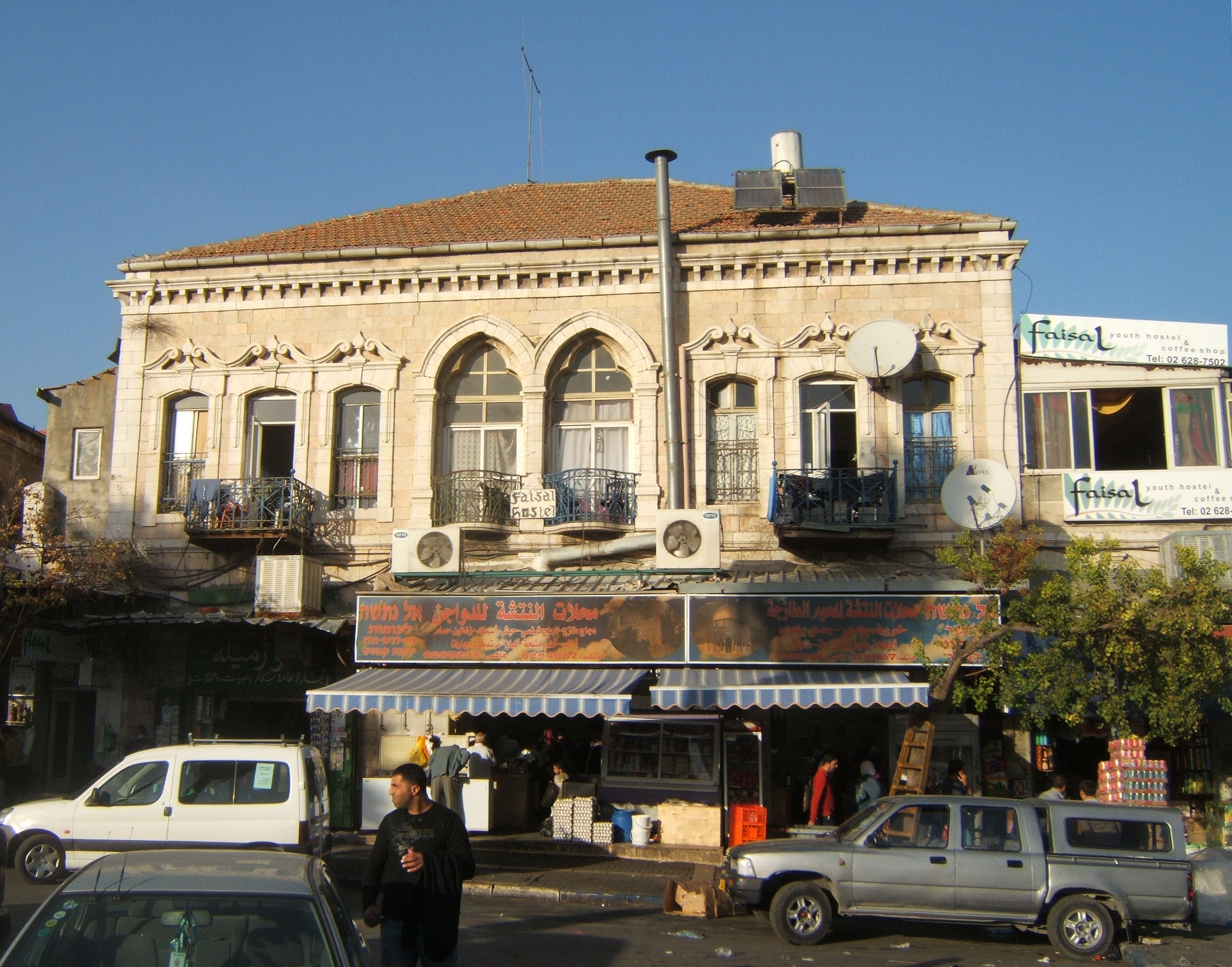
An Arab house on the eastern end of Street of the Prophets.

In the late 19th century, several Jewish neighborhoods were founded at the eastern end of Street of the Prophets, near Damascus Gate. Kirya Ne'emana (commonly known as Batei Nissan Beck, "Nissan Beck Houses"), was founded in 1875 for Hasidic residents. In the 1880s and 1890s additional housing was built for Syrian, Iraqi, and Persian Jews. Eshel Avraham was established in 1893 for Georgian and Caucasian Jews. These neighborhoods were virtually abandoned during the 1929 Palestine riots and the homes taken over by Christians and Muslims. The remaining Jewish residents left with the Arab takeover of East Jerusalem after 1948.

Beginning in the 1880s, an Ethiopian Christian community developed around the Ethiopian Church of Debre Gannet (Mount of Paradise) located on a site in Ethiopia Street bought in 1888, just north of Street of the Prophets. Under the initiative of Empress Taytu Betul, Ethiopian nobles and wealthy individuals contributed large sums of money to purchase houses on Ethiopia Street and Street of the Prophets, which belong to the community to this day. Situated immediately south to the Street of the Prophets, the Russian Compound was erected between 1860–1864 in order to accommodate the masses of Russian Orthodox pilgrims visiting Jerusalem.

== Architecture ==
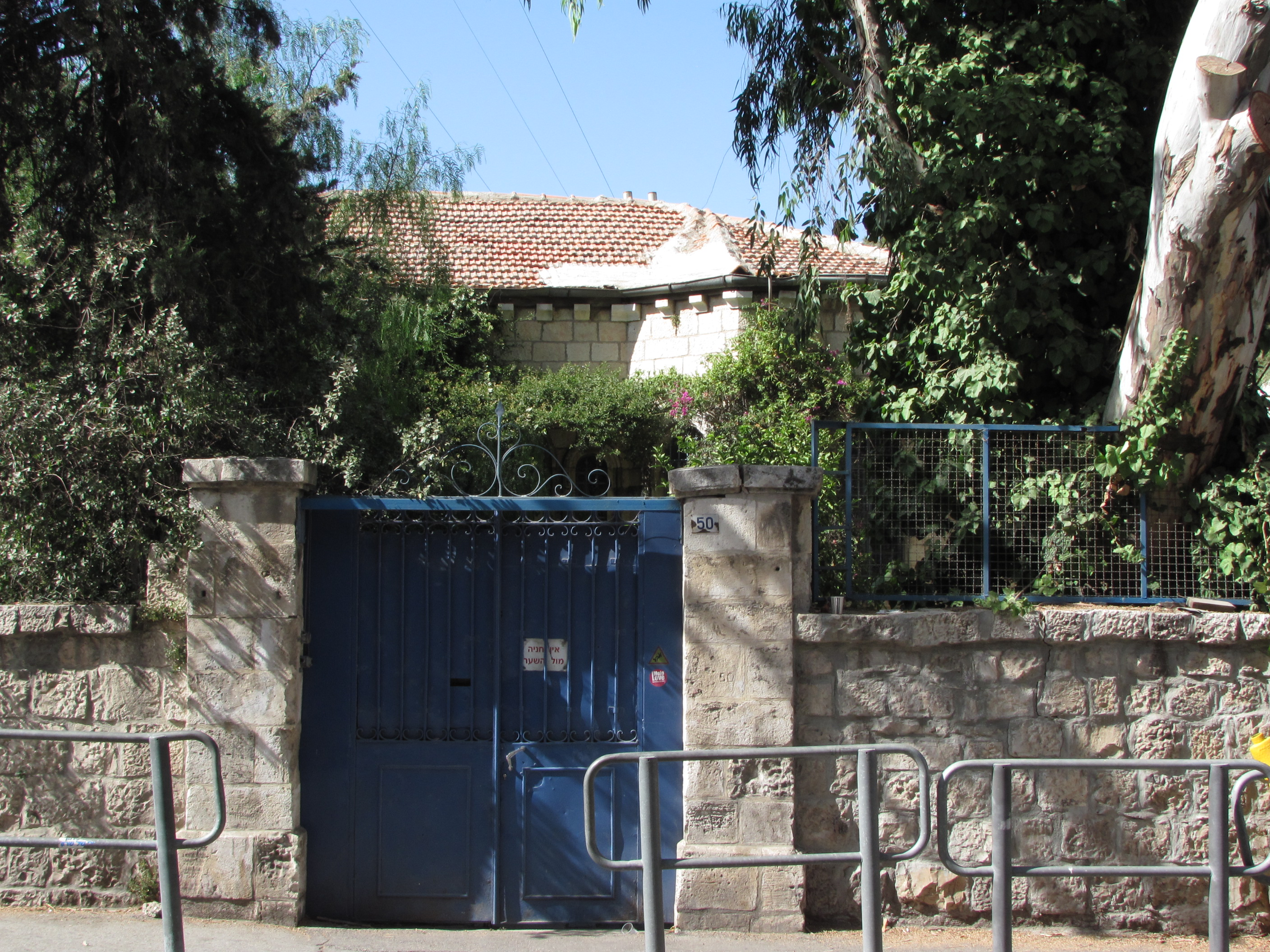
Typical house and garden fronted by a high stone wall

Most of the buildings on Street of the Prophets are constructed of stone and fronted by high walls built of stone and mortar. Private-home lots are large and include garden courtyards, either in front of the building (e.g. Hunt House, Navon Bey House, Mahanaim House) or behind it (e.g. Pasha's Village). The homes are one or two stories high; public buildings do not exceed four stories.

Many public and private buildings on the western side of Street of the Prophets, from Shivtei Israel Street to Davidka Square, are built in the European style and reflect the nationality of their builders. For example, the German Deaconess Hospital and its bell tower (today the eastern wing of Bikur Cholim Hospital) are typical of churches and other public buildings in Germany. Buildings and doors along the street are decorated with religious symbols such as crosses, Stars of David, crescents, symbols of religious institutes, and Bible verses.

Several buildings were designed by architect Conrad Schick: the mission of the London Jews' Society (today the Anglican International School); parts of the German hospital, and the Tabor House (today the Swedish Theological Institute) (#58), which Schick made into his own home. Schick planned the William Holman Hunt House (#64), which Hunt himself built.

The Renaissance-style Italian Hospital compound, containing a Tuscany-style church, was designed by Antonio Barluzzi, who created several other Christian churches in Jerusalem. It was completed in 1919; today it houses the Israel Ministry of Education and Culture.

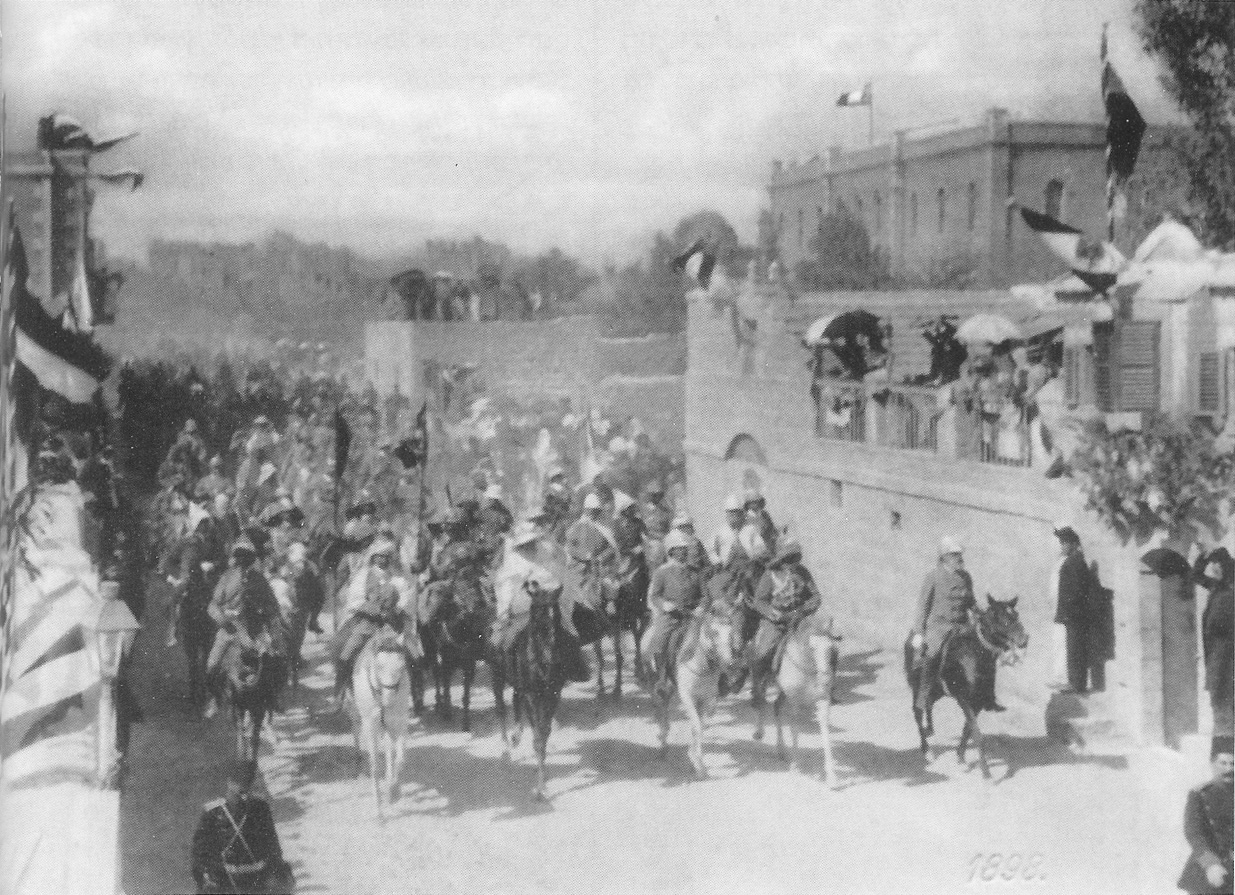
Procession of Emperor Wilhelm II in the Street of the Prophets, October 29, 1898. Tabor House is at right.

In 1898, Theodor Herzl came to Jerusalem for the first time to meet with German emperor Wilhelm II, who was also visiting this city. Herzl met the emperor on an empty lot at #42 Street of the Prophets, where Wilhelm and his entourage were quartered in a tent camp. Herzl's efforts to plead the Zionist cause with the emperor were unsuccessful. Following the emperor's visit, the Ottoman authorities gave him the lot as a gift; Wilhelm, in turn, granted it to the German provostry, which constructed its headquarters there in 1903. Today the former provostry is part of the Jerusalem ORT campus.

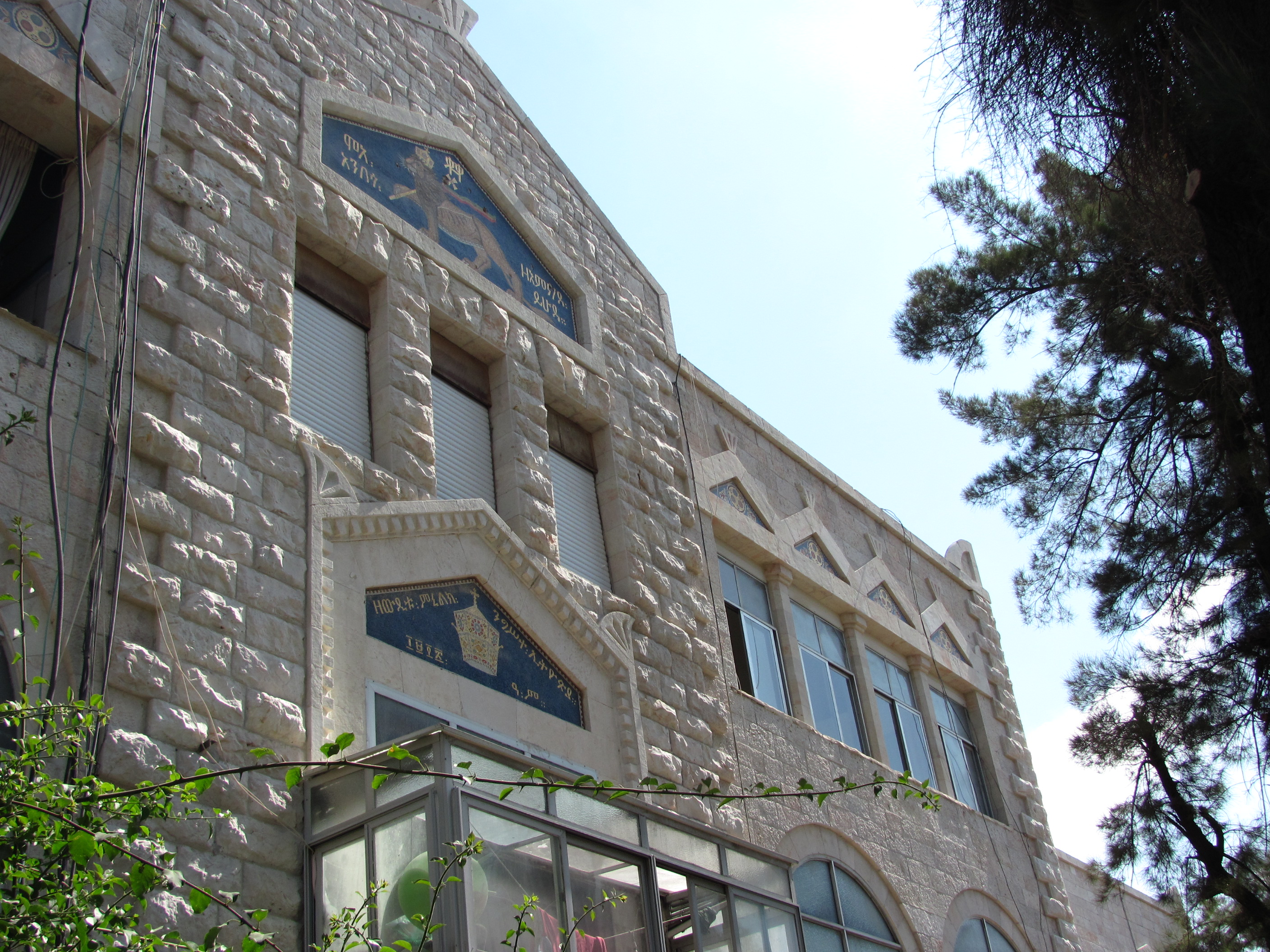
Ethiopian consulate building

The former Ethiopian consulate building at #38 and #40 is the sole representative of African architecture. The land for the building was purchased in 1910 by Baron von Ustinov on the directive of Empress Taytu of Ethiopia; his widow, Magdalena, sold the property and the partially finished building to Empress Zauditu in 1924. The white stone structure, completed in 1928, has gabled windows decorated with bright blue and gold porcelain mosaics. The largest mosaic depicts a lion bearing a cross and flag—the symbol of the Ethiopian royal family—with the inscription in Ge'ez: "The Lion of Judah Triumphs". Today the building is an apartment complex.

=== Armenian mosaic ===
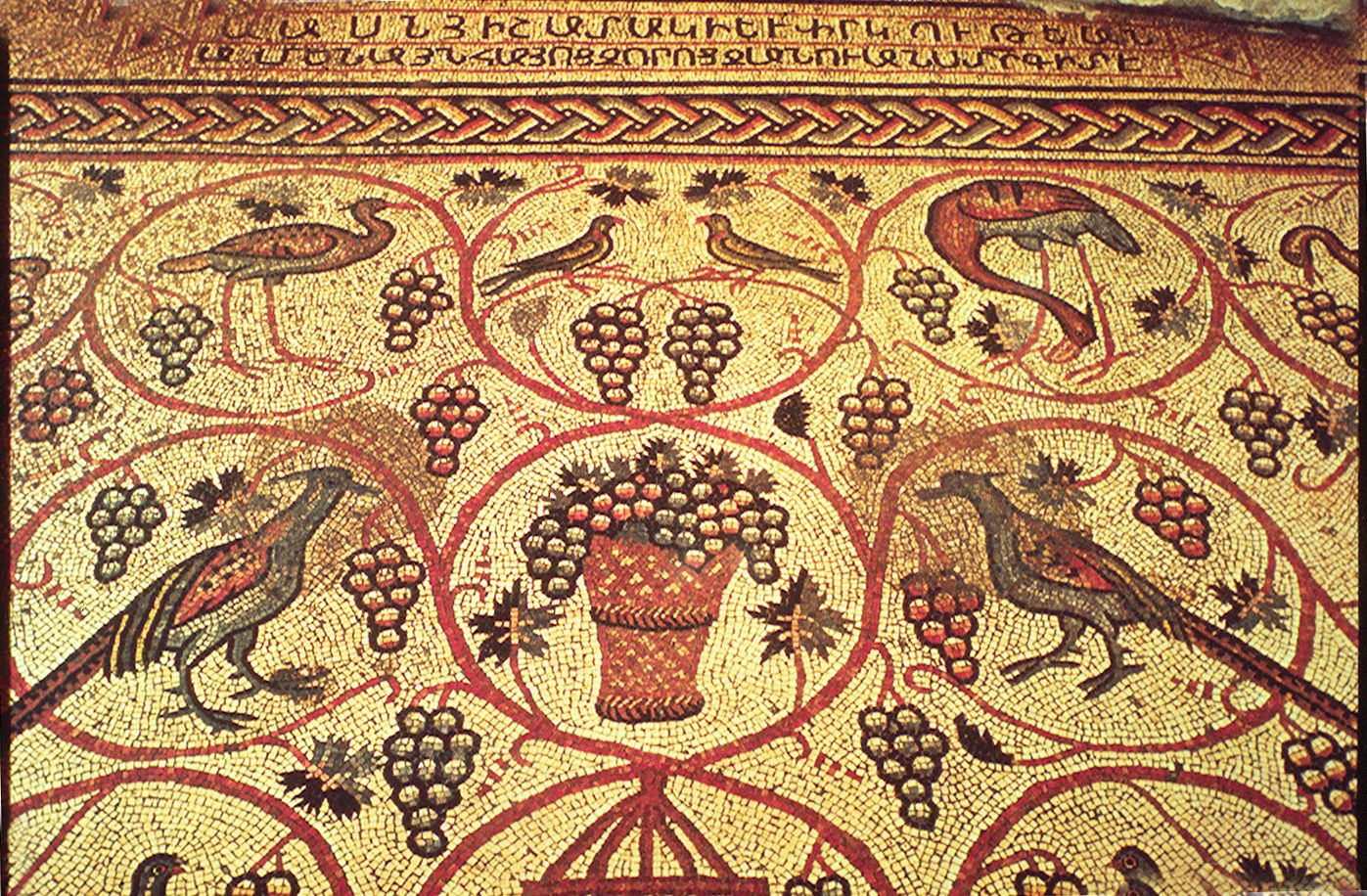
Partial view of Armenian mosaic with inscription at top

In 1894 a burial cave containing an ancient mosaic floor was discovered during excavation work for the construction of two houses at what is now 16-18 Street of the Prophets. Known as the "bird mosaic", the floor depicts peacocks, ducks, storks, pigeons, an eagle, a partridge, and a parrot in a cage, along with branches and grape clusters, all symbols of death in early Christian art. An inscription at the top of the mosaic reads, "For the memory and salvation of all those Armenians whose name the Lord knows". Beneath a corner of the mosaic lay a natural cave containing human bones which were dated to the 5th or 6th century, indicating that the room was used as a mortuary chapel.

==== New location ====
The two-story buildings, constructed by Muslims, currently house a health clinic and the Bird Mosaic can now be seen in the courtyard of the Mardigian Museum in the Armenian Quarter of the Old City, which reopened in 2022.

== Military headquarters ==
During both world wars and the 1948 Arab–Israeli war, large buildings on the Street of the Prophets were appropriated for military use. The English Mission Hospital, for example, was used by the Ottoman army to house their wounded soldiers during World War I; in 1917, the British Mandate officials turned it into the headquarters for the 60th Division that conquered Jerusalem. The Italian Hospital headquartered the British Royal Air Force during World War II.

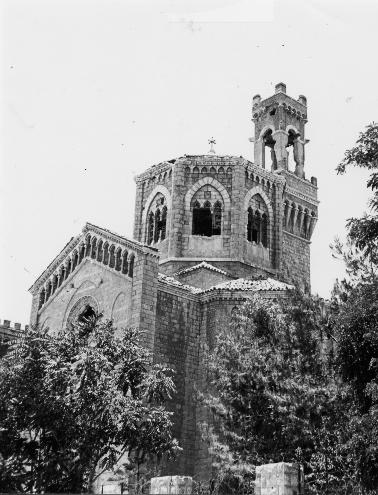
The church of the Italian Hospital compound in 1948

In 1948, the eastern end of the street, forming a triangle with the Old City walls and the southern side of the neighborhood of Musrara, was part of the no man's land between Israel and Jordan. The street was returned to Israel with the reunification of Jerusalem in 1967.

== Urban development ==
In the late 1980s, a proposal was made to widen the narrow, two-lane street into a 32-meter-wide main road. The proposal met with stiff opposition from Jerusalem residents, as it called for destroying the historic garden courtyards of the buildings lining the street. An alternate plan called for laying the highway across the courtyards while retaining the outer stone walls to maintain the 19th-century look of the street. Neither plan has come to fruition. In late 2009, during construction on Jaffa Road for the Jerusalem Light Rail, Egged city buses that normally traversed Jaffa Road were diverted onto Street of the Prophets. The street also sees increased traffic as an alternate route for buses traveling to northern Jerusalem neighborhoods (via Road 1) whenever Straus Street is closed due to demonstrations. In recent years, the city has granted permits for the development of high-rise, luxury apartment projects on and alongside Street of the Prophets. These projects are expected to alter the quiet, exclusive nature of the street.

== Modern institutions ==
=== Schools ===
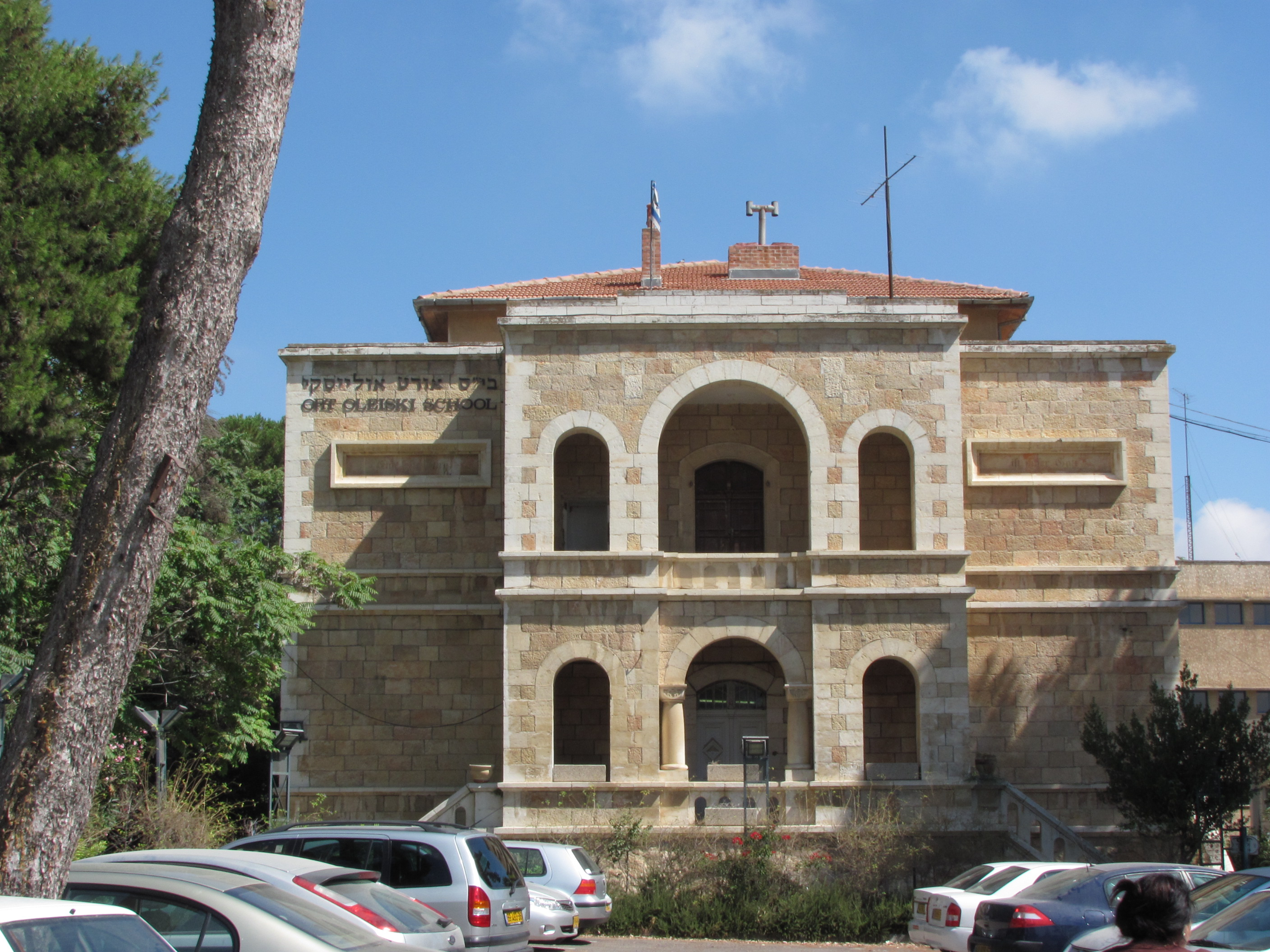
Jerusalem ORT campus, formerly home and office of the provost of the Redeemer Church.

- Anglican International School (#82)
- Hadassah College Jerusalem (formerly Hadassah College of Technology) (#37)
- Jerusalem ORT (#42)
- Lycée français de Jérusalem (French School) (#66)

=== Hospitals ===
- Bikur Holim Hospital

Between 1976 and 1988, a railway coach parked a few meters east of Bikur Holim Hospital housed the national headquarters for the Yad Sarah home-care equipment lending organization. The building at #43 Street of the Prophets still bears the organization's name.

=== Christian organizations ===
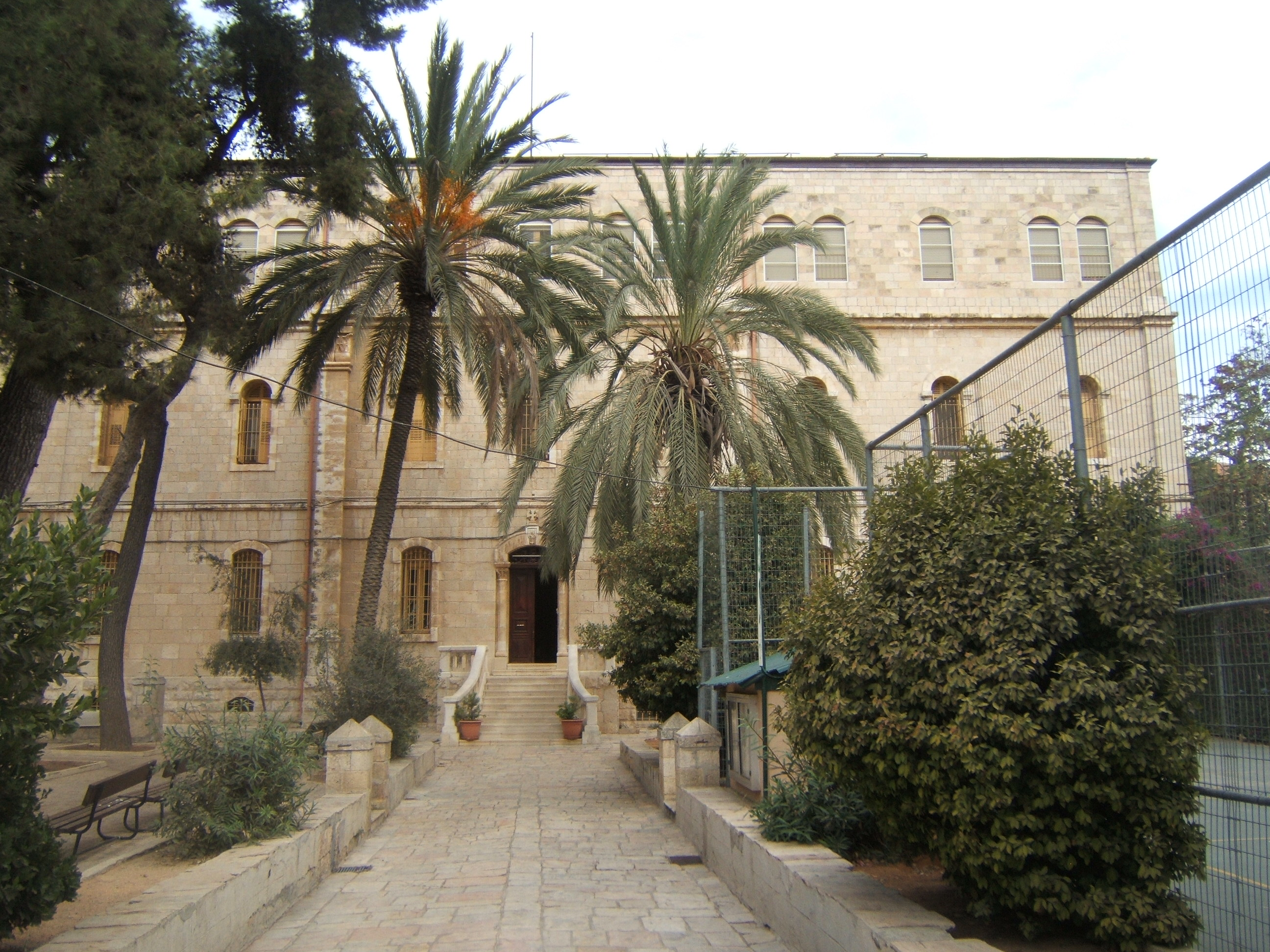
St. Joseph Convent

- International Evangelical Church (#55)
- St. Joseph of the Apparition Convent (#66)
- Swedish Theological Institute (#58)

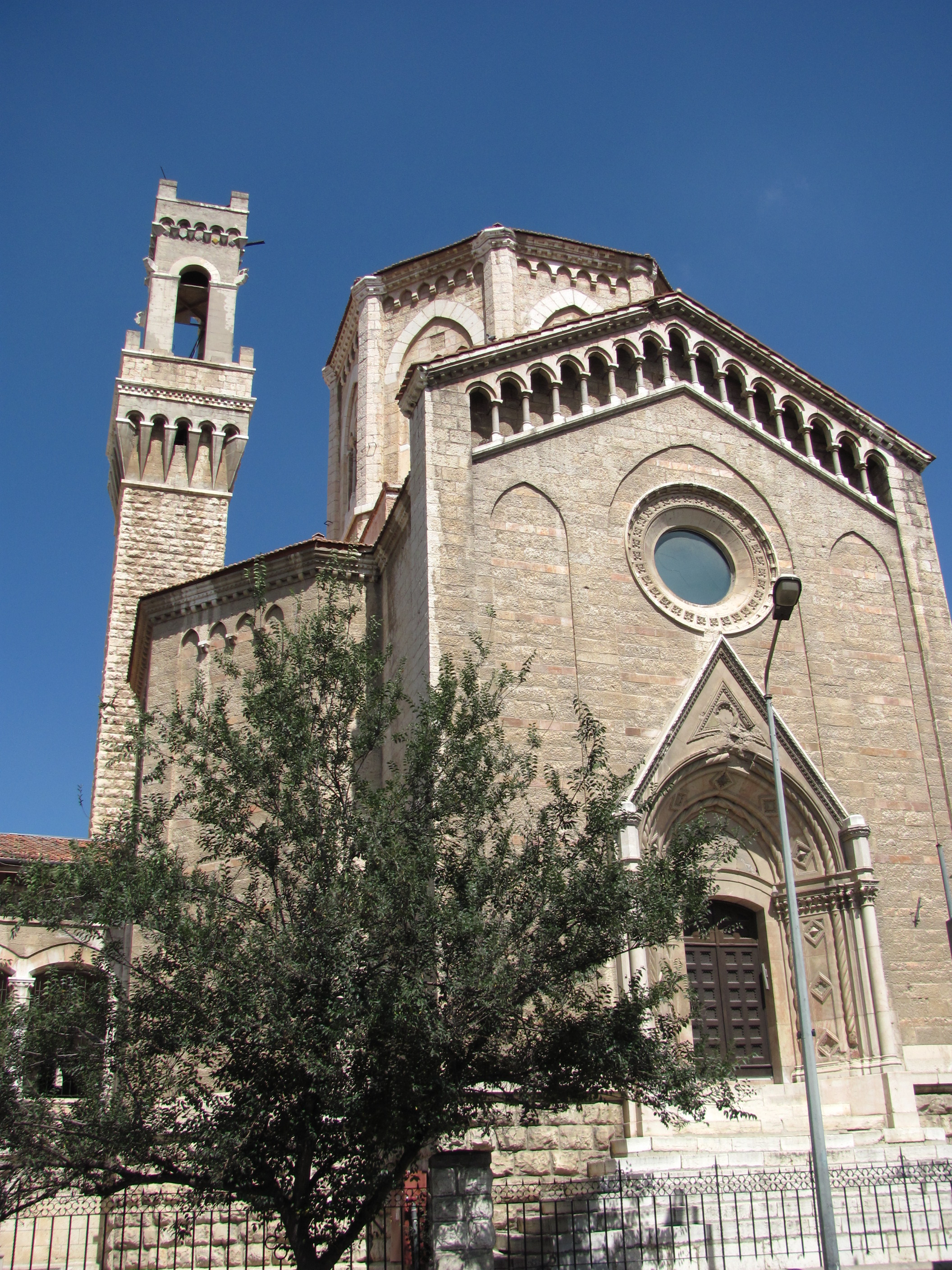
Front view of the church from the Italian Hospital compound, today the Ministry of Education and Culture

- Shevet Achim, an international community that brings children with congenital heart defects to the medical centers in Israel (#29)

=== Government offices ===
- Ministry of Education and Culture (Italian Hospital building)
- Ministry of Education office (Lev-Ram building)
- Ministry of Education (Mahanaim house)

=== Hostels ===
- Abraham Hostel
- Palm Hostel

=== Memorials ===
- Davidka Square, at the western end of the street (corner Jaffa Road), commemorates the homemade mortar called the Davidka used during the 1948 Arab-Israeli War
- Mitzpe Tomer (Tomer Observation Post) at the eastern end of the street (corner Highway 60) commemorates the spot where, in April 2002, a traveling car bomb detonated, killing 19-year-old Israeli border policeman Mordechai Tomer
