= Tabor House (Jerusalem) =

Coordinates: 31.78424°N 35.220548°E

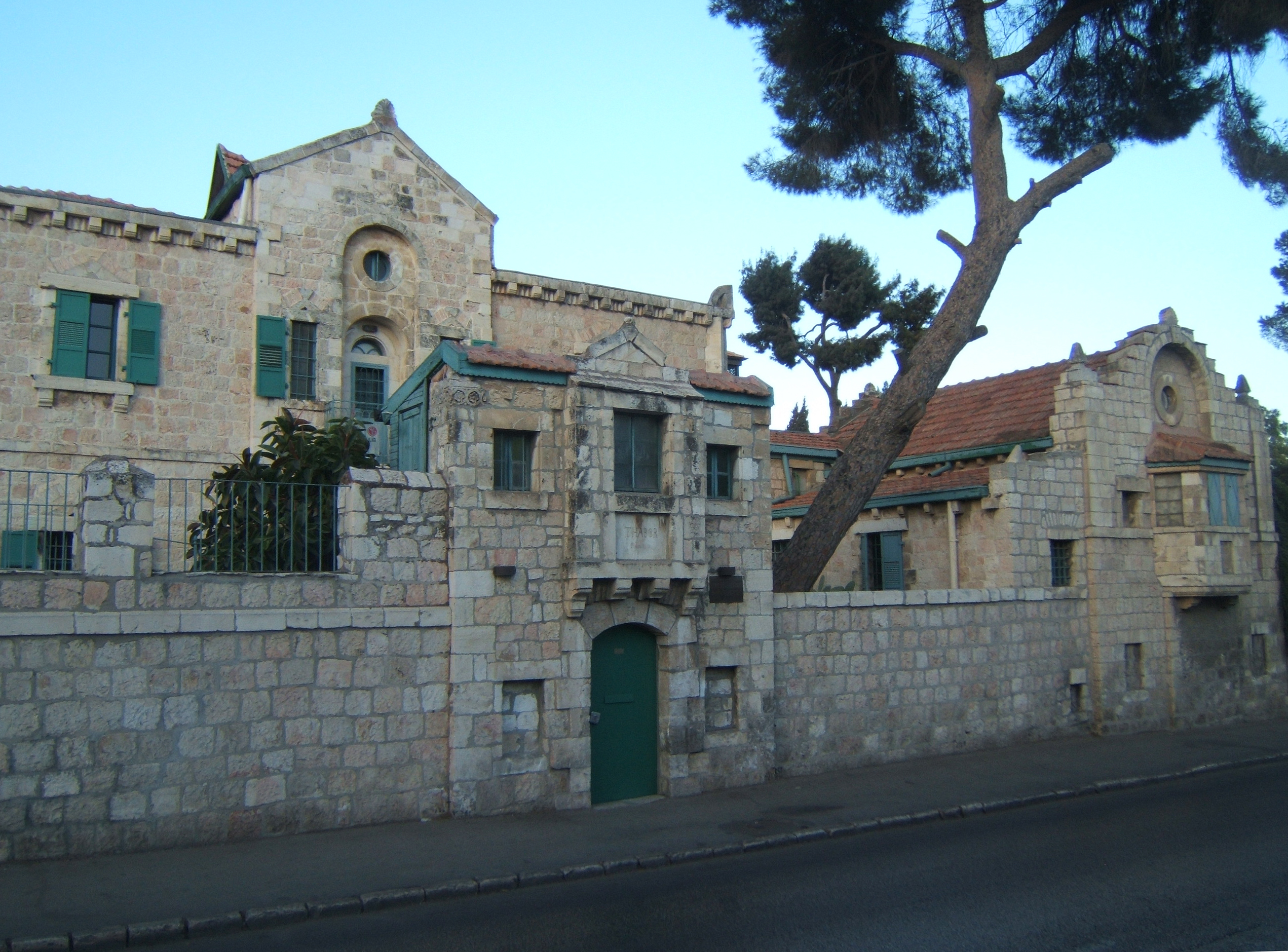
Thabor House, Jerusalem

Thabor House or Tabor House (Beit Tavor in Hebrew) is a landmark building in Jerusalem, Israel.

Tabor House was built in 1882 by archaeologist, missionary and architect Conrad Schick as a home for his family. The building is located at 58 Street of the Prophets. The name was taken from Psalm 89:12: "The north and the south, Thou has created them; Tabor and Hermon shall rejoice in Thy name." Palm leaves with the carved Greek letters Alpha and Omega decorate the façade. Schick lived in the house until his death in 1901.

In 1951, the house was purchased by Swedish Protestants who established the Swedish Theological Institute there. The building, with a turret and thick stone walls, contains a small church, two libraries and a shaded interior courtyard.

== See also ==
- Architecture of Israel
