= Davidka =

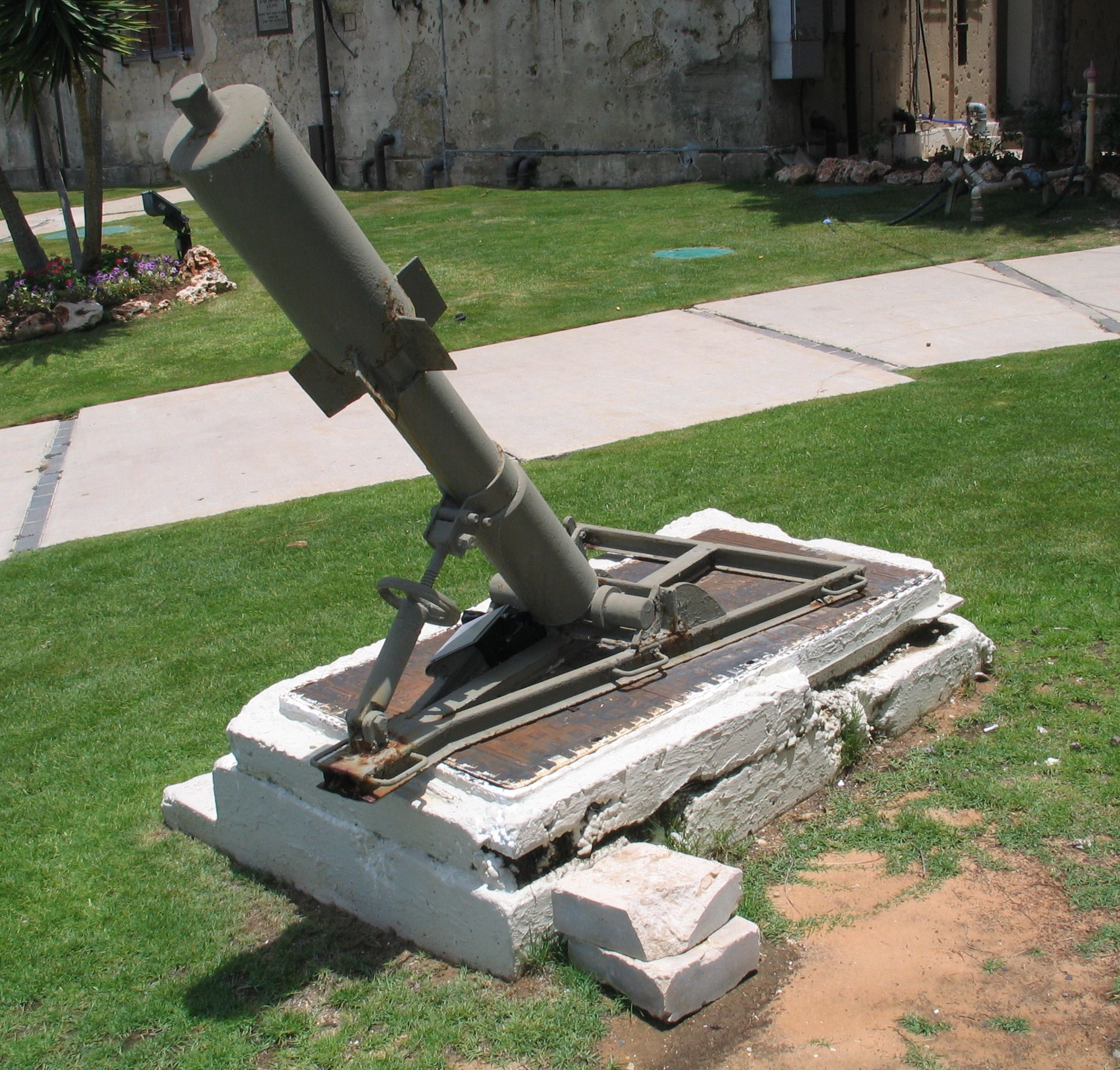
- Davidka mortar, Givati Museum, Israel
- Type: Mortar
- Place of origin: Israel

Service history
- In service: 1948
- Used by: Palmach
- Wars: 1948 Arab–Israeli War

Production history
- Designer: David Leibowitch
- Designed: 1947–48
- Produced: 1948
- No. built: Six

Specifications
- Shell: Explosive grenade
- Shell weight: 40 kilograms (88.2 lb)
- Caliber: 3 inches (7.62 cm)
- Filling: TNT
- Filling weight: 60 pounds (27.2 kg)

The Davidka (Yiddish: דוידקה) was a homemade Israeli mortar used in Safed and Jerusalem during 1947–1949 Palestine war. Its bombs were reported to be extremely loud, but very inaccurate and otherwise of little value beyond terrifying opponents; they proved particularly useful in scaring away both Arab soldiers and civilians. It is nominally classified as a 3-inch (76.2 mm) mortar, although the bomb was considerably larger.

== Etymology ==
The Davidka (the word may be interpreted either "Little David" or "Made by David" in Russian) was named for its inventor, David Leibowitch, although the name also metaphorically evoked the biblical battle of David and Goliath (I Samuel chap. 17): In 1948, the defense forces of the state of Israel felt themselves fighting against the "giant" British-trained and British-led professional Arab Legion, amongst many others, and so they felt the metaphor appropriate.

== History ==
The mortar was designed at the Mikveh Israel agricultural school in Holon in the winter of 1947–1948. It was first used in combat on March 13, 1948, in the attack on the Abu Kabir neighborhood of Jaffa. The greatest victory attributed to the Davidka was the liberation of the Citadel, a strongpoint in the center of Safed, on the night of May 9–10, 1948.

Six Davidkas were manufactured in all, and two were given to each of the Palmach's three brigades (Harel, Yiftach, and HaNegev). One was used by the Yiftach Brigade in the battle for Safed, and now stands in a square in Safed. Another stands in Jerusalem's Davidka Square, memorializing the Harel Brigade's participation in the battle for Jerusalem. The Hebrew inscription on the monument ("וגנותי על-העיר הזאת, להושיעה") is from 2 Kings 19:34, meaning "For I will defend this city, to save it" (where God miraculously saves Jerusalem in honor of King David, the namesake of the weapon).

== Characteristics ==
The secret of the Davidka was its 40 kg (88 lb) bomb, which was much larger than the mortar from which it was fired.

In conventional mortars, the bomb is inserted into the tube and the entire projectile travels through the tube to gain initial guidance at launch time. The Davidka's tail tube is the only part of the shell which fit inside the launch tube. This contributed to the weapon's notorious inaccuracy, as the shell lacked adequate guidance during the launch phase to acquire aerodynamic stability in the intended direction. It is not a spigot mortar, either; in a spigot mortar the "barrel" is a guiding rod inserted inside the shell's propellant chamber. The Davidka's propellant chamber fires inside the mortar tube (barrel) as does a conventional mortar, but the 3 inch (76.2 mm) caliber of the barrel is much smaller than the caliber of the warhead of the bomb. It is therefore an oversized conventional mortar, where most of the bomb, and especially its center of gravity, remain outside the barrel—an aerodynamically unstable design, which only worked at all because the center of pressure was still within the barrel. The head of the bomb was essentially a large can filled with nails, rocks, or any other material which could be used for shrapnel. This meant that the blast effects of the weapon were completely random and of dubious efficacy as an anti-personnel weapon. It was of no practical value for siege combat or other light artillery purposes, but it made a loud bang.

Small pieces of metal and tubes were welded onto the outside of the casing, reducing the weapon's accuracy even further than its already non-aerodynamic design, but contributing greatly to the whistles and shrieks which it made when in flight. The noise was its most important effect, so that anyone attacked by a Davidka mortar would hear the shell seeming to fall very near to them before bursting very loudly, increasing the fear factor. The Arabs abandoned many strongholds during the war as a direct result of this visceral fear: one story relates that, having been told that many of the proponents and designers of America's atomic bomb were Jewish (e.g., Einstein and Oppenheimer), the Arabs thought that they were being attacked with atomic weapons and subsequently abandoned their homes. This was especially true in the liberation of Safed.

The Davidka was used in the battles for Haifa, Ein Zeitun, Safed and Biddu. According to Palestinian historian Walid Khalidi, the Davidka carried a bomb that weighed 60 lb (27 kg) and caused fear and panic when used in built-up areas.

== Syrian rebels' copy ==
In a May 2013 Al Jazeera video, the first still photo on the title page shows a concept copy of the DAVIDKA made by the Syrian rebels, but with larger wings and an LP tank added to enhance the effect of the high explosive payload.

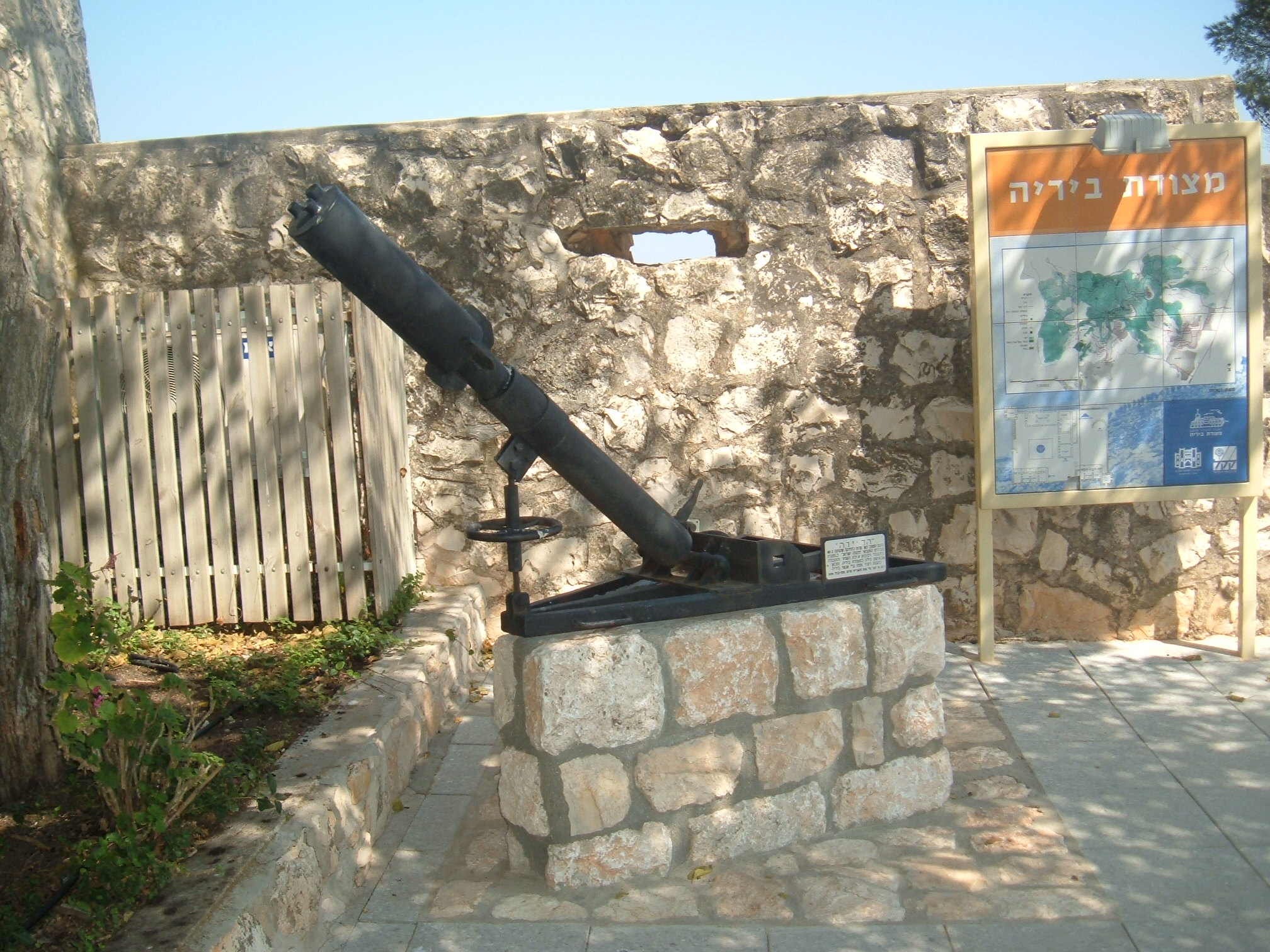
Davidka at Birya Fortress

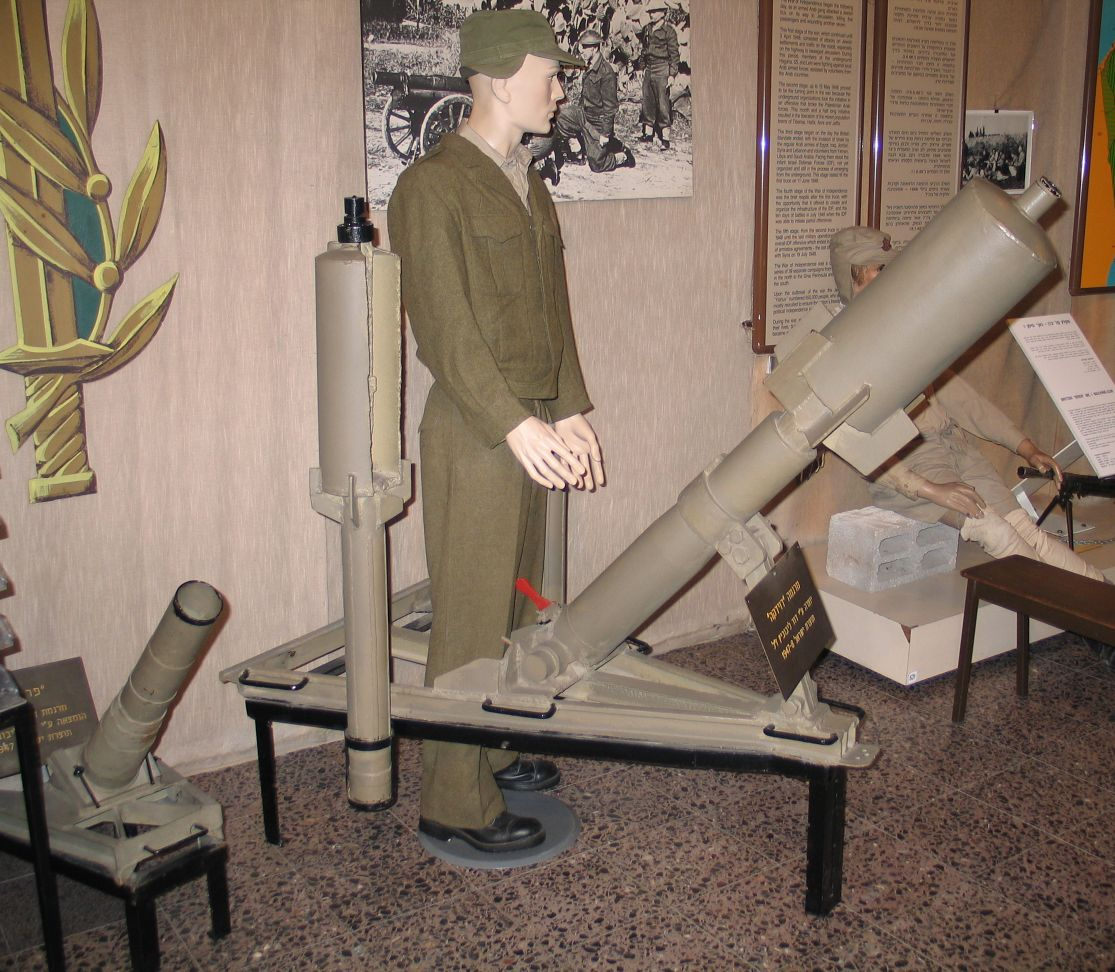
Batei HaOsef Museum exhibit of a Davidka mortar with a cutaway shell to the left of the mannequin

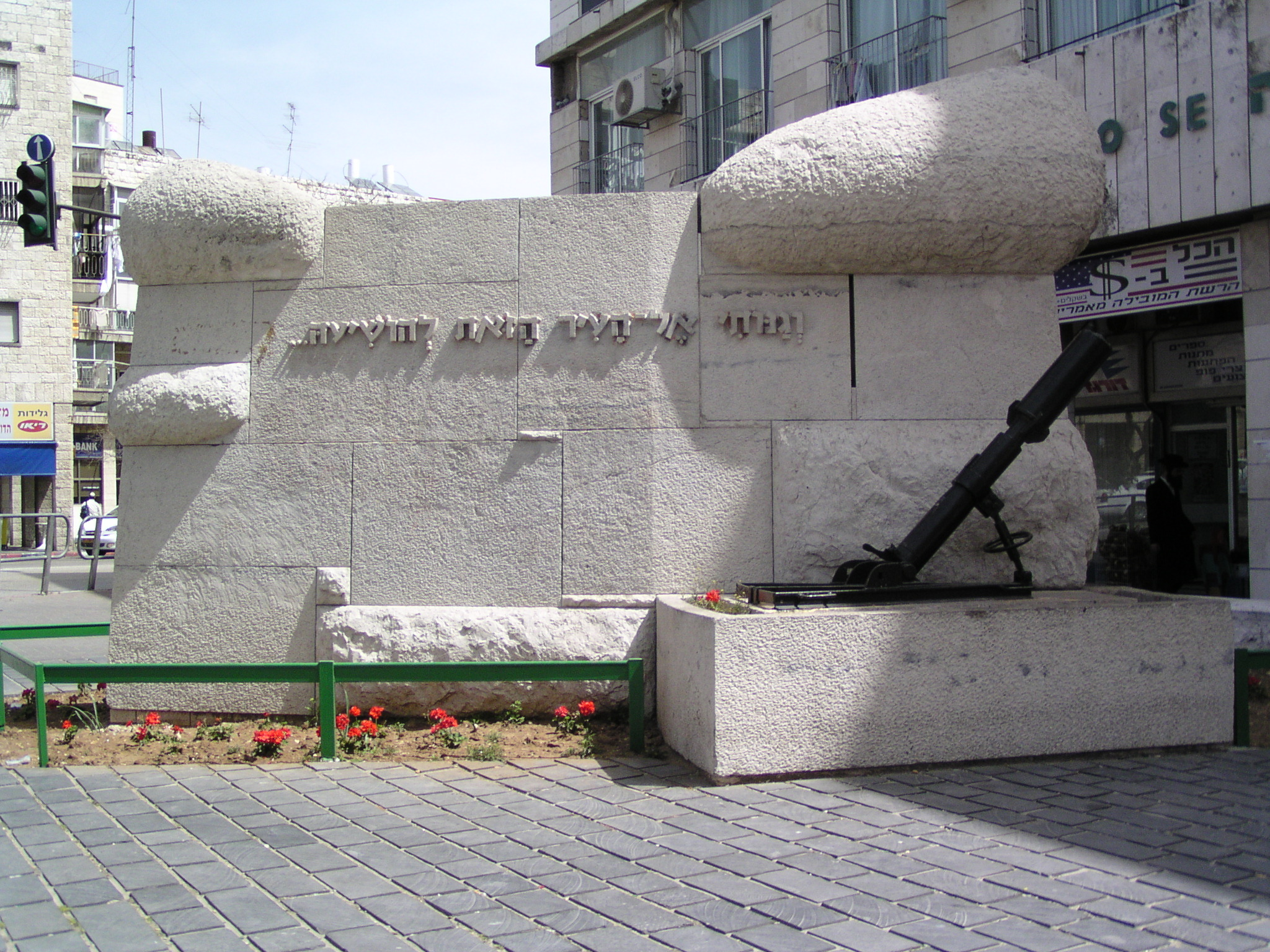
Davidka memorial in Davidka Square, Jerusalem

== See also ==
- Improvised artillery in the Syrian civil war
- Barrack buster - improvised mortar created by the Provisional Irish Republican Army
