= Davidka Square =

Public square in Jerusalem

Coordinates: 31°47′5″N 35°12′53″E

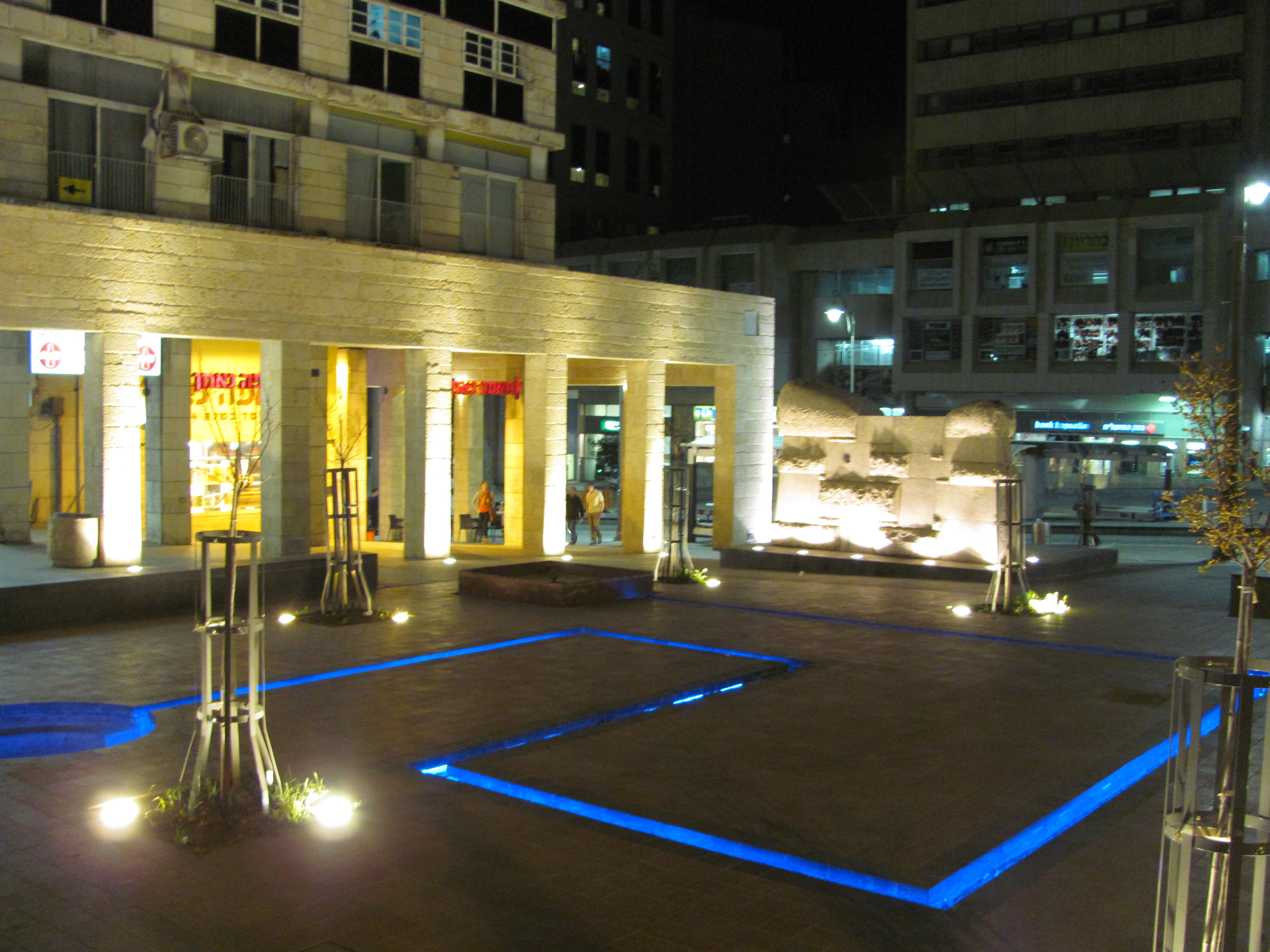
Davidka Square at night, looking toward the back of the Davidka memorial and Jaffa Road.

Davidka Square (Hebrew: כיכר הדוידקה, romanized: Kikar HaDavidka) is a public square at the intersection of Jaffa Road, Street of the Prophets, and Pines Street in West Jerusalem. Its official name is Kikar Haherut (Hebrew: כיכר החירות, lit. 'Freedom Square'). It features a small memorial to the Davidka, a homemade Israeli mortar used in the defense of Jerusalem and other cities during the 1948 Arab–Israeli War.

== Background ==
In the early stages of the War of Independence, the Israeli army had no artillery other than a primitive, homemade mortar that was not accurate but that made a thunderous explosion. The noise from this weapon – called the Davidka ("Little David") after its inventor, engineer David Leibovitch – often sent the enemy fleeing in panic. Mistaking the Davidka's explosion for an atomic bomb, the Arabs abandoned the northern town of Safed. The mortar was also used by the Harel Brigade in its defense of Jerusalem. The Israeli army used the Davidka exclusively until July 1948, when it was able to acquire conventional artillery such as mountain howitzers, cannons and field guns.

== Memorial ==
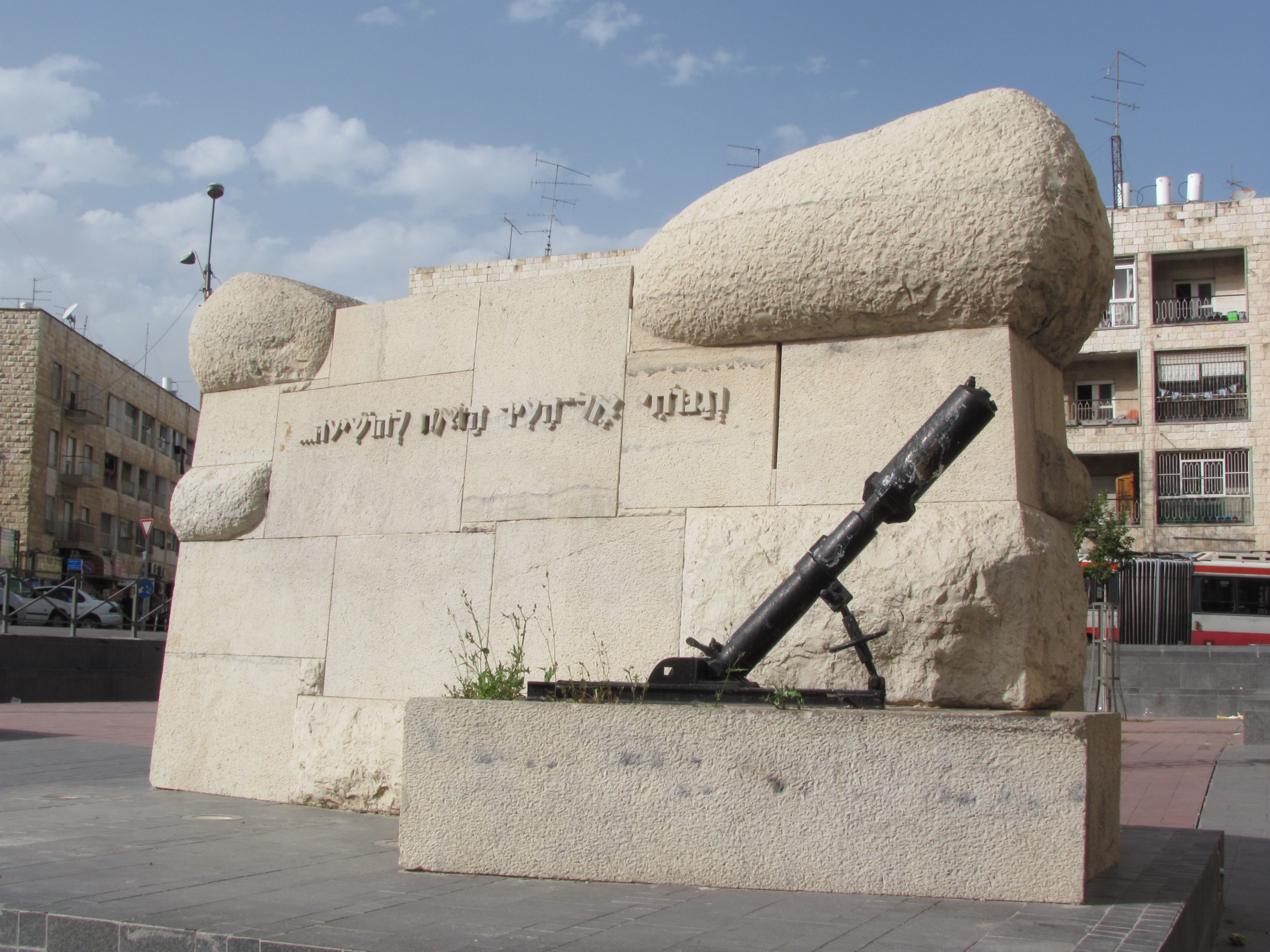
The memorial in 2011.

In 1956 the Jerusalem municipality commissioned a memorial to the Davidka designed by architect Asher Hiram. A Davidka used by the Harel Brigade was mounted on a stone platform engraved with part of the verse from the Book of Kings: "I will defend this city, to save it" (2 Kings 19:34). Two small, rounded projections on one side of the memorial and one larger protection on the other evoke the shape of the cap worn by Palmach soldiers. On Israeli Fallen Soldiers and Victims of Terrorism Remembrance Day, city representatives lay wreaths on the Davidka in memory of the soldiers who died in defense of the city.

== Renovation ==
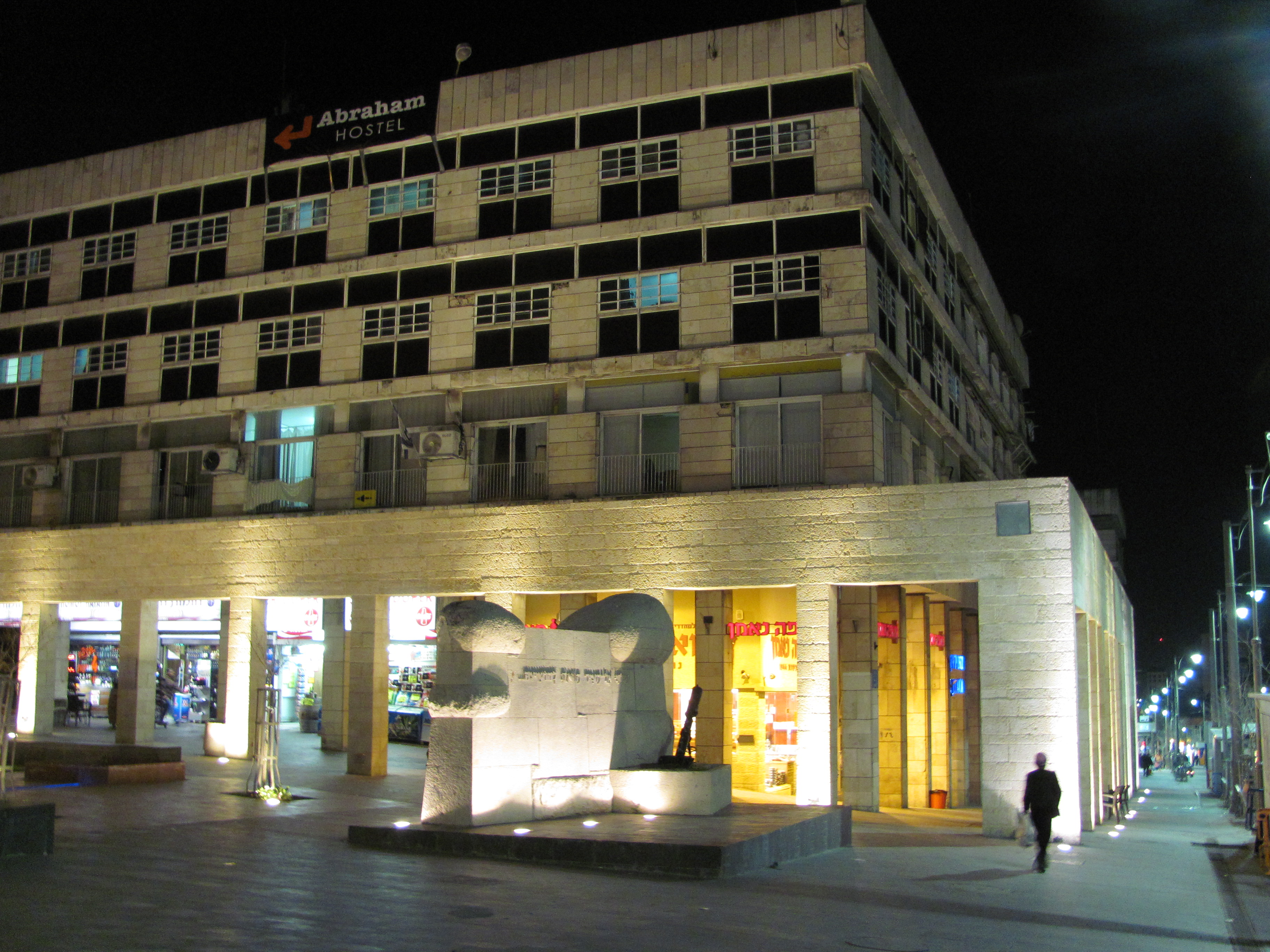
Partial view of Davidka Square at night, with the Davidka memorial at center and vertically-lit stone columns fronting the shopping arcade.

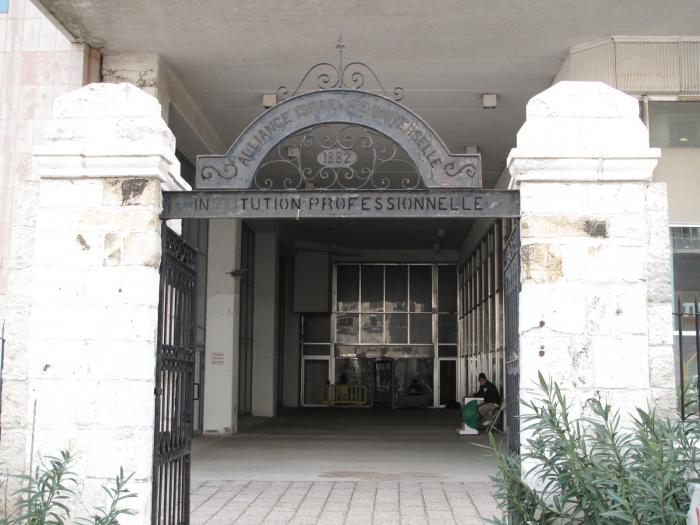
The gate to the Alliance school.

Davidka Square is one of the few commercial squares in the city. It is surrounded on three sides by shops, and opens on to Jaffa Road, a major commercial artery. For decades it stood as a dreary, gray corner. In 2009, when work on the Jerusalem Light Rail project necessitated extensive infrastructure and redesign work on all three squares on Jaffa Road – the others being Tzahal Square near the Old City walls and Zion Square – the Jerusalem municipality hired Mexican architect Ricardo Legorreta to renovate Davidka Square.

Legorreta's plan enlarged the area designated for pedestrians and greenery to 99.486 square feet (9.2426 m^{2}). He paved the square with reddish stones and added a blue trench as a "water element". To emphasize the historical importance of the site, Legorretta also designed elements on a double scale. These include a wall measuring 18 metres (59 ft) high and 9 metres (30 ft) wide, covered by red ceramic plaques, allowing the square "to be identified from far away" and stone columns 4.5 metres (15 ft) in height that function as "vertical lamps" during the night. The standout design elements generated controversy among Jerusalem residents when they were first proposed. A public protest led by the Lemallah grassroots citizens watch group, which produced a YouTube video, circulated a petition, and brought protesters to city planning meetings, nixed the red wall installation.

== Adjacent structures ==
In 2011 the Abraham Hostel opened in Davidka Square which was ranked 8th best large hostel in the world by HostelWorld.com.

The future inter-city Jerusalem–Central railway station is planned for construction underground nearby the square.

== Other Davidka memorials ==
Another Davidka memorial stands a few meters south of Safed's Town Hall, opposite the old British police station. The memorial, established on 29 April 1956 and renovated in the 2000s, includes an engraved stone marker and an audio information post relating information about the liberation of Safed in both Hebrew and English, along with seating for tour groups. Every year on Israel's Remembrance Day, the city conducts a wreath-laying ceremony here.

A Davidka also stands on display at the Beit Hativat Givati Museum in Metzudat Yoav.
