= Swedish Theological Institute =

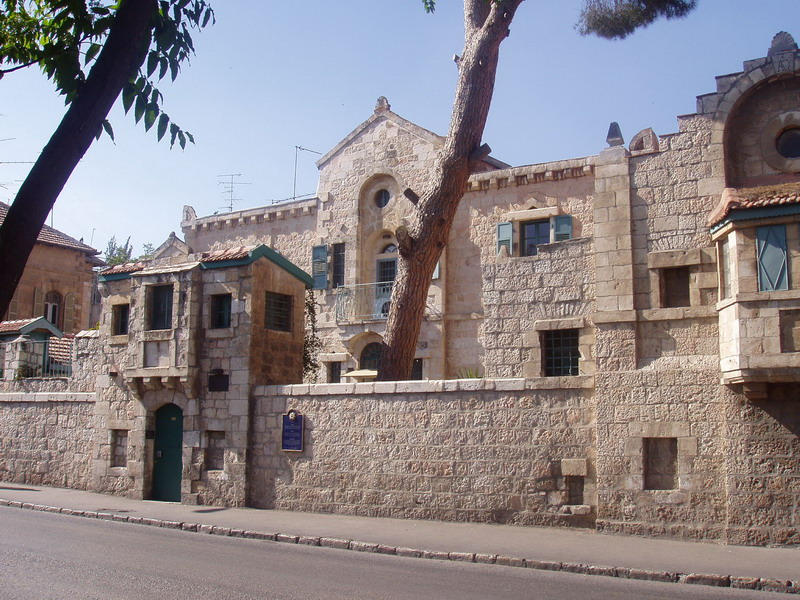
- Tabor House, Jerusalem, home of the school

Location
- 58 Rehov HaNeviim; Jerusalem; Israel
- Coordinates: 31.784062°N 35.220532°E

Information
- Religious affiliations: Church of Sweden, Christianity
- Established: 1951; 75 years ago
- Director: Dr. Maria Leppäkari
- Website: svenskakyrkan.se

The Swedish Theological Institute (STI) is an institute in Jerusalem supported by the Church of Sweden. Christian students of theology can gain a deeper understanding of Judaism at the Institute, and also of Christianity and Islam.

== Purpose ==
The institute gives theology students the opportunity to study in a city that has played a central role in three of the world's major religions. The institute provides a place where Christians, Jews and Muslims can meet. It helps to eradicate prejudice against Jews. More recently the institute has gained a greater emphasis on research into subjects such as Christian Zionism.

== Organization ==
The STI is mostly funded by the Church of Sweden, but gets about one third of its income from tuition fees. It has eleven employees of whom four are Swedish and the remaining seven are locals. The school is closely associated with the Lund University. Professor Jesper Svartvik, who teaches at the institute, is from the university. Student groups from Lund visit the institute for short but intensive courses in the holy land. The STI maintains contact with the Sigtuna foundation, the Swedish Institute in Alexandria and the Swedish Research Institute in Istanbul. The school also maintains links in Jerusalem with the Hebrew University, Tantur Ecumenical Institute, Jerusalem Center for Jewish-Christian Relations and other organizations.

== Activities ==
The STI provides courses where students can study and conduct research at Master and Doctoral levels. Shorter courses are offered that can contribute to a university degree for students from Sweden and other countries. Course are offered in both English and Swedish. STI also provides a base where students and researchers can live or study while in Jerusalem. The Chapel of Saint Bridget provides a place of worship for the local Swedish congregation. Lutheran services are held there regularly in the Swedish language.

== Campus ==
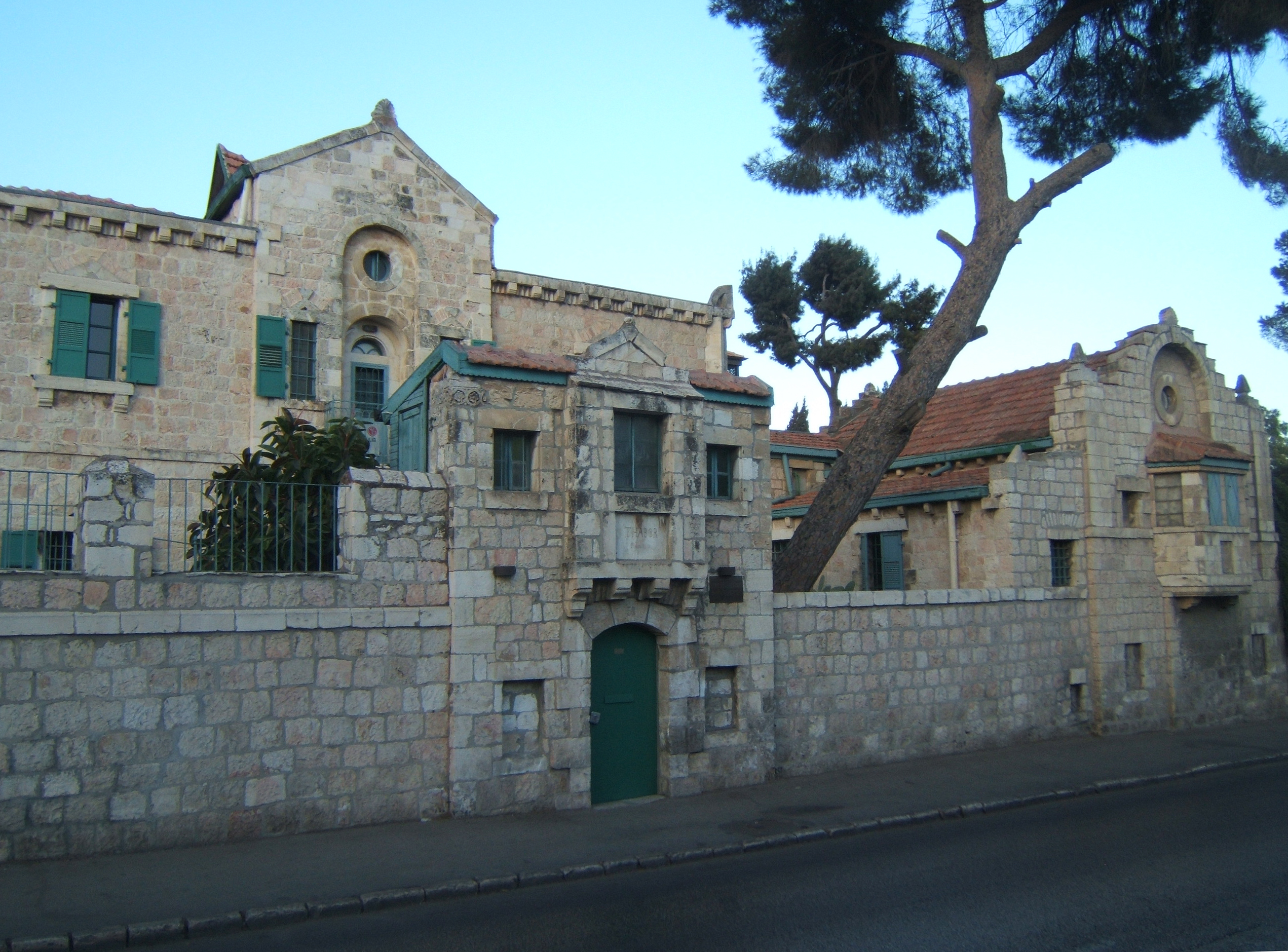
Tabor house

The STI campus is located in Tabor House, on the Street of the Prophets, in the Musrara neighborhood, just outside the Old City. The house was built by the German architect and missionary Conrad Schick (1822–1901). The house, surrounded by a walled courtyard, was completed in 1889 and was Schick's home until his death in 1901. It combines different styles, both western and eastern, modern and traditional. The building has classrooms, a library where students can study, a chapel and offices. There is also a kitchen, dining room, common meeting room and a few rooms where overnight guests can stay.
