= Basil IV (Coptic archbishop of Jerusalem) =

Coptic archbishop of Jerusalem

His Eminence Basil IV
- Metropolitan of the Holy and Great City of Our Lord, Jerusalem (Holy Zion), and Archbishop of the Holy and Ancient Archdiocese of Jerusalem, all Palestine and the Near East; Abbot of the Monasteries of Saint Anthony, and Saint George, Jerusalem.
- Native name: الأنبا باسيليوس
- Church: Coptic Orthodox Church
- Archdiocese: Coptic Orthodox Archdiocese of Jerusalem
- Metropolis: Jerusalem
- Predecessor: James II
- Successor: Abraham II

Orders
- Consecration: 7 June 1959 by Pope Cyril VI
- Rank: Metropolitan Archbishop

Personal details
- Born: 1 November 1923 Asyut, Asyut, Egypt
- Died: 13 October 1991 (aged 67) Wadi al-Seer, Amman, Jordan
- Buried: Monastery of Saint Anthony, Red Sea Wilderness
- Education: Diploma in Theology, M.S. in Theology, PhD in Church History
- Alma mater: Coptic Theological and Clerical College, Higher Institute of Coptic Studies, Aristotle University of Thessaloniki

Basil IV, (Arabic: الأنبا باسيليوس, Coptic: Ⲁⲃⲃⲁ Ⲃⲁⲥⲓⲗⲓⲟⲥ), was the 20th Metropolitan of the Holy and Great City of Our Lord, Jerusalem (Holy Zion), and Archbishop of the Holy and Ancient Archdiocese of Jerusalem, all Palestine and the Near East, from 1959, until his death in 1991.

== Early life ==
Samy Tawadros Girgis (Arabic: سامي تاوضروس جرجس), in Asyut, Asyut, Egypt was born on November 1, 1923; he was the fifth of six siblings. After completing his secondary education in 1940, he travelled to Cairo and met with Archdeacon Habib Girgis, seeking to be enrolled in the Coptic Theological and Clerical College. He graduated first of his class from the Coptic Theological and Clerical College, and received a Diploma in Theology in 1943.

Following his graduation, he worked as a Christian Religious Education teacher in Rizkallah al-Mashriqi Secondary School in Girga, Sohag, Egypt. During his years in Girga, he helped establish the Rizkallah al-Mashriqi Primary School, and was appointed its Principal.

== Monastic life ==
Late in 1946, he departed to the Monastery of Saint Anthony, seeking the monastic life, and was tonsured a monk there. His monastic name was Monk Cyril of Saint Anthony (Arabic: أبونا الراهب كيرلس الأنطونى). He was later ordained to the priesthood, and he served as a priest in Ezbet el Deir, the headquarters of the Monastery of Saint Anthony in Bush, Beni Suef, Egypt, and the Church of the Virgin Mary in Al-Molleha, Hadaiq Al Qubbah, Cairo, Egypt. During his time as a monk he wrote a book about the life of Saint Anthony, titled "Star of the Wilderness (Arabic: كوكب البرية)" (1950), and another book about the Ecumenical councils titled "The Age of the Councils (Arabic: عصر المجامع)" (1952).

He also continued his education, by enrolling in the Higher Institute of Coptic Studies. During this time, he was also sent on a scholarship by the Coptic Theological and Clerical College to study at the School of Theology at the Aristotle University of Thessaloniki. In 1956, he completed both a M.S. in Theology from the Higher Institute of Coptic Studies, and a PhD on "The Role of the Copts during the Reign of Emperor Heraclius" from the School of Theology at the Aristotle University of Thessaloniki.

Following the completion of his PhD, he was appointed as a Professor of Church History at the Coptic Theological and Clerical College. Also, due to his academic excellence, and his fluent knowledge of English, French, Greek, and Coptic, alongside his native Arabic, he was chosen by Professor Aziz Suryal Atiya to be an editor of the Coptic Encyclopedia. During this time, he was also elevated to the dignity of Hegumen.

== Episcopate ==
=== Consecration ===
In 1956, both Metropolitan James II of Jerusalem and Pope Joseph II of Alexandria, died. Thus, both the See of Jerusalem, and the See of Alexandria would remain vacant from 1956 to 1959. Upon his enthronement on May 10, 1959, Pope Cyril VI of Alexandria made it his top priority to consecrate a bishop for Jerusalem, seeing that three years was a long time for such an important See, held second only to the See of Alexandria in the Coptic tradition, to remain empty. After discussing the possible candidates for the position, Pope Cyril VI, and the Holy Synod, came to the final decision of appointing Hegumen Monk Cyril of Saint Anthony, due to his immense qualifications.

Upon hearing news of this decision, and feeling himself unworthy of the Episcopate, he escaped and hid himself seeking to escape the appointment. The Bishops and Metropolitans, however, continued to seek him, and of those who were personally acquainted with him, some wrote to him words of encouragement. Eventually he relented and accepted the will of the Pope and Holy Synod.

On June 7, 1959, he was consecrated as Bail IV, Metropolitan of Jerusalem and Archbishop of all Palestine, Philadelphia of Jordan, and all the Near East, by the hands of Pope Cyril VI and the Bishops and Metropolitans of the Holy Synod. He was the first Bishop to be consecrated by the then newly appointed Patriarch, Pope Cyril VI.

=== Service ===
During his reign, communities of Coptic expatriates emerged in the newly developing countries of the Arabian Gulf, such as the United Arab Emirates, Qatar, and Kuwait. These communities required a lot of care and attention and there was no church infrastructure to support them within these countries, as Coptic communities had never been present there before that time. Thus, he spent much effort during his reign establishing new churches and monasteries to serve these new communities.

He also constructed the Monastery of the Virgin Mary in Bethlehem, and also revived the service of the Antonine College, and the Saint Demiana College. He also put much effort into the restoration of the Coptic possessions in and around Jerusalem, and the Holy Land.

=== Deir al-Sultan Conflict ===
During the Easter Vigil in the Church of the Holy Sepulcher on April 25, 1970, the Israeli government sent military forces to change the locks of the monastery to enable the Ethiopian monks to take control of it. Afterwards, the Israeli Supreme Court unanimously approved the restoration of the monastery to the Copts on March 16, 1971, yet the Israeli government refused to implement the Supreme Court ruling.

Metropolitan Basil, put much time and effort during his time to try and resolve this issue, however it has yet to be resolved.

== Death ==
On September 24, 1991, he went on a pastoral visit to the flock in Amman, Jordan. Following a long day of service, he retired to his room to rest at around midnight. When morning came and he did not exit his room, the fathers who were with him felt worried, and went in to check on him, finding him comatose on his bed. He was rushed to Luzmila Hospital, where he was diagnosed with a brain stroke. When news of this came to the then King of Jordan, King Hussein, he ordered him to be transported to the King Hussein Medical Center, to ensure that he receive effective treatment. He remained ill in the hospital, falling in and out of consciousness, and with minimal control over his body, until his death early in the morning on Sunday October 13, 1991. Upon his death, he was transported to Cairo, where the funerary rites were prayed upon him by Pope Shenouda III, in the Virgin Mary Cathedral, Zeitoun. He was buried in a specially prepared tomb in the Monastery of Saint Anthony, in the Red Sea Wilderness.

== Published works ==
He wrote a great number of books including:

- Analytical Study of the Book of Zachariah (Arabic: دراسات تحليلية فى سفر زكريا); (published as a periodical column in the "Awakening Magazine (Arabic: مجلة اليقظة)", 1943–1945)
- Strong Arguments Against Protestant Delusions (Arabic: البراهين القوية فى دحض الأضاليل البروتستانتية);
- Star of the Wilderness (Arabic: كوكب البرية); (1950)
- The Age of the Councils (Arabic: عصر المجامع); (1952)
- Saint Cyril the Pillar of the Faith (Arabic: القديس كيرلس عمود الإيمان);
- The Pillar of Religion and Rock of Faith (Arabic: عمود الدين صخرة الإيمان);
- The Copts During the Islamic Invasion (Arabic: القبط وقت الفتح الإسلامي);
- The Orthodoxy of the Coptic Church (Arabic: أرثوذكسية الكنيسة القبطية); (written in Greek)
- The Coptic Orthodox Right of Ownership of Deir al-Sultan (Arabic: ملكية دير السلطان للأقباط الأرثوذكس); (1961)

Oriental Orthodox titles
Preceded by James II	Coptic Metropolitan of Jerusalem; 1959-1991	Succeeded by Abraham II
