= Coptic Orthodox Sunday School Movement =

The Sunday School Movement (Arabic: مدارس الاحد) is a catechetical movement within the Coptic Orthodox Church. It was founded in the early 20th century, in an effort to spread Oriental Orthodox theological education among the laity of the Coptic Orthodox Church, combating foreign missionary efforts orchestrated in 19th century Egypt by the Roman Catholic Church, the Church of England, and numerous American-protestant movements.

== Background ==
=== Early catechetical education ===
The early Church of Alexandria, the fore-barer of the Coptic Church, was renowned for its catechetical education. The Catechetical School of Alexandria was originally founded as a tool for educating new Christian converts. As adult conversions became scarce and more children were born into the faith, the school evolved into a theological seminary, with catechism performed at a more personal level throughout the childhood and lifetime of the believer. In the late Middle Ages the Islamic system of kuttabs was unofficially adopted by the Church. Much like mosques, churches began operating small educational institutions which taught both secular and religious matters. This system was ineffective as it relied mostly on the rote memorization of stories, verses, and praise, and paid no attention to actual comprehension of theological concepts. The low quality of Christian education, coupled with harsh waves of persecution under Mamluk and Ottoman rule, resulted in centuries of darkness for the Coptic Church. Thus, at the start of the 19th century the majority of the clergy and congregation of the Coptic Church were theologically illiterate.

=== Western Missions ===
The first European missionaries to show up in Egypt were Roman Catholics. During the Fifth Crusade, Saint Francis of Assisi had visited Egypt in hopes of converting its Sultan. Later, in the 1600s, Capuchins and Franciscans began establishing missions in Ottoman Egypt, under a special Austrian-Hungarian treaty of religious protection. Although the success of these missions was limited, the Coptic Church proved ineffective in combating them, and the population of Coptic Catholics continued to increase slowly. By the reign of Pope John XVIII (1769-1796) the presence of these Catholics finally began putting pressure on the Coptic Church with regards to issues of conversion and mixed-marriages.

Events at the start of the 19th century, such as the French Expedition to Egypt, and the rise of Muhammad Ali, lead to a further increase in European influence and presence in Egypt. Muhammad Ali sought to establish an independent nation state in Egypt, similar to those of Western Europe. To achieve this mission he opened the country up to foreign interests in hopes of benefiting from their expertise in modernizing the Egyptian economy, military, bureaucracy, and education system. With the establishment of foreign schools, came foreign missionaries who at first attempted to proselytize to the general population. However, finding resistance from the government and Islamic institutions, they decided to focus only on the Coptic Christians. One of the earliest groups, the Church Missionary Society (CMS), a British Protestant Evangelistic Society arrived in Egypt in the 1820s. Unlike the Catholics who had established their own Church in Egypt parallel to the Coptic Church, the CMS aimed to change the Coptic Church from within. In addition to distributing Arabic Bibles and tracts, the society also founded a Coptic Seminary in 1843, aimed to educate the Coptic clergy and spread the missionaries' beliefs to them. Although the mission was tolerated by Pope Peter VII, the clergy were suspicious of the mission and did not enroll in its seminary, which ended up shutting down by 1848.

In 1854 American missionaries began arriving in Egypt. Rather than focusing on the clergy, they chose to center their focus on the younger generations. They began on building schools and publishing new Arabic translations of the Bible. By 1878, they had established more than 35 schools, and by 1899 they had formed the American Presbyterian Synod of the Nile. The American Presbyterian Mission also had begun running "Sabbath (Sunday) Schools" in order to target and proselytize to children using illustrated books, pictures, and the question and answer method of catechism. Following suite, many of the other missions began running their own Sunday Schools. By the year 1878, there were around 4,378 children attending the various denomination Sunday School programs; the majority of these children were Copts.

== History ==
=== Coptic Response to Western Missionaries ===
In response to the western missionaries, the Coptic Church began to implement reforms in order to combat their influence, especially during the reigns of Pope Cyril IV and Pope Cyril V. Pope Cyril IV seeing the lack of education of the clergy, organized weekly theological seminars for the clergy in and near Cairo. Inspired by the western missionary schools, he also built many Coptic Schools following the same model which taught theological subjects in addition to secular ones. He also purchased a printing press and began to standardize the Coptic-Arabic, hymnals, euchologions, and lectionaries of the Church. He also began ecumenical work in order to better connect the Coptic Church with other Orthodox Churches. In 1893 Pope Cyril V reopened the Coptic Seminary in Cairo, and later added to it three branches in Alexandria, Bush, and the Monastery of Al-Muharaq. Pope Cyril V also sent seven monks to study at the Theological College in Athens. These reforms compiled within the later half of the 19th century began to produce a new generation of Coptic Theologians, greater in number than any seen for centuries. Between 1877 and 1907, the new generation of Theologians published seven independent periodicals which aimed to raise the awareness of the general Coptic congregation concerning coptic theology, history, and patristics.

While the Coptic Church had taken many steps to combat western proselytization of adults through the education of the clergy, and the publishing of apologetic periodicals, the youth and children remained vulnerable. Although the church had founded schools of their own, they were limited in number and did not have a large reach into society, with the majority of students attending either missionary or public schools. While public schools provided Islamic education classes to their Muslim students, no parallel existed for Christians. In 1898 the Holy Synod issued a decree on the necessity of providing Christian Education to school children, and the Church lobbied to incorporate Christian education into public schools; the government, however, refused.

=== Foundations of the Sunday School Movement ===
In 1898, while still a student at the Cairo Coptic Seminary, Habib Girgis began informally gathering every Sunday with the children at Saint Mary's Church in Faggala to teach them about the Bible, Coptic rites, church history, and the lives of the saints and martyrs. In these meetings he sought to replicate the model of the Sunday Schools run by the missionaries in order to better educate the Coptic children on their faith. In 1899 he published his first Coptic Catechism book, The Doctrines of the Coptic Orthodox Faith: A Foundational Synopsis. Since there were no Coptic Orthodox prepared children's media to aid in catechism at the time, he took it upon himself to adapt the materials from the protestant Sunday Schools to be used in Coptic catechism. As the service began to flourish, Habib Girgis began to expand to other churches in Cairo, recruiting the assistance of other seminarians. In 1900, he began traveling to Upper Egypt to begin implementation of the new program there. As the Coptic Sunday Schools began to spread across Egypt, Habib Girgis and others established the society of Al-Mahaba to help in organizing it. In 1907 Pope Cyril V wrote a message to encourage the Sunday School Servants and pastors in continuing to educate the future generations. While the movement met much resistance in its formative years, by 1907 there were more than 46 Coptic Sunday Schools, a significant number given the movements young age at the time.

=== The Early Sunday School Movement ===
In 1918 the Coptic Sunday School movement began to be formally adopted by the Church. Protests against the name and its protestant inspiration led to the official name being The Sunday Gospel for Schools, however, that name did not last long, and soon the original name of the movement was restored. A General Committee seated in Cairo was set up to organize curricula and the administrative functions of the movement. Habib Girgis who was by this time the Dean of the Theological Seminary, was named General Secretary of the Committee, with Pope Cyril V being its president. Due to the general feelings of mistrust between the clergy and the laity at that time, Habib Girgis ensured that the Sunday School remained a joint effort between the two, ensuring that the clergy of a local parish had key roles in its Sunday School. By 1936, the number of Sunday Schools in Egypt had grown to 85, with three in Sudan, and 1 in Ethiopia. To maintain the quality of the spiritual education offered by the Sunday School servants, Habib Girgis mandated that they all pass specific accreditation courses. Since many Servants lived in distant and remote areas, many of them had to complete their Servant Certifications by correspondence; this marked the first time distance education had been implemented in Egypt. As the Sunday School movement began to expand, it began to issue its own publication, the Sunday School Magazine in 1948. The role of the magazine was to disseminate information about the movement as well to provide an extra means of Christian Education. By the end of Habib Girgis's life, in 1951, the Sunday school movement had expanded to include 650 branches, with a total of 2100 classes, 43,000 pupils, served by 2,500 teachers in both Egypt and Sudan.

=== The Modern Movement ===
The highly bureaucratic and well organized form of the Sunday School movement designed by Habib Girgis did not survive long after his death. The decisions of subsequent leaders led to the decentralization of the Coptic Sunday School Movement. Today the Sunday Schools run effectively independent from one another, with several different curricula offered regionally. Each individual parish or diocese is responsible for preparing its own servants, and choosing which curriculum of the numerous ones available to use. The Sunday Schools continue to be an essential way through which the Coptic Church educates its children, and has spread outside Egypt following the Coptic Diaspora.

== Key Figures ==
- Pope Cyril V of Alexandria
- Saint Archdeacon Habib Girgis
- Pope Shenouda III of Alexandria
- Hegumen Antonious Ragheb
- Bishop Musa of the Youth Bishopric
