= James II (Coptic archbishop of Jerusalem) =

Coptic archbishop of Jerusalem

His Eminence James II
- Metropolitan of the Holy and Great City of Our Lord, Jerusalem (Holy Zion), and Archbishop of the Holy and Ancient Archdiocese of Jerusalem, all Palestine and the Near East; Abbot of the Monasteries of Saint Anthony, and Saint George, Jerusalem.
- Native name: (Arabic: الأنبا ياكوبوس, Coptic: Ⲁⲃⲃⲁ Ⲓⲁⲕⲱⲃⲟⲥ)
- Church: Coptic Orthodox Church
- Archdiocese: Coptic Orthodox Archdiocese of Jerusalem
- Metropolis: Jerusalem
- Predecessor: Theophilus
- Successor: Basil IV

Orders
- Consecration: 1 September 1946 by Pope Joseph II
- Rank: Metropolitan Archbishop

Personal details
- Born: 1908 Al-Mutiah, Asyut, Asyut, Egypt
- Died: 22 March 1956 (aged 47–48)
- Buried: Monastery of Saint Anthony, Red Sea Wilderness
- Education: Diploma in Theology
- Alma mater: Coptic Theological and Clerical College

James II (1908 – 22 March 1956; Arabic: الأنبا ياكوبوس, Coptic: Ⲁⲃⲃⲁ Ⲓⲁⲕⲱⲃⲟⲥ) was the 19th Metropolitan of the Holy and Great City of Our Lord, Jerusalem (Holy Zion), and Archbishop of the Holy and Ancient Archdiocese of Jerusalem, all Palestine and the Near East, from 1946, until his death in 1956.

== Early life ==
He was born in the village of Al-Mutiah, in the District of Asyut, Asyut Governorate, Egypt, in the year 1908. He received his primary and secondary education at the American College in Asyut. It is said that he enjoyed theological studies from his youth, and had monastic tendencies. In 1939, after completing his secondary education, he enrolled in the Coptic Theological and Clerical College, in Cairo, from which he graduated in 1942.

== Monastic life ==
Directly after his graduation from the Coptic Theological and Clerical College, in Cairo, in 1942, he joined the Monastery of Saint Anthony the Great, in the Eastern Desert. He was ordained a priest in 1944, and elevated to the dignity of Hegumen in November 1945. In March 1946, he was appointed as a deputy for the Diocese of El Balyana, and served in this capacity until his consecration as Metropolitan Archbishop of Jerusalem.

== Episcopate ==
=== Consecration ===
On Sunday, September 1, 1946, He was consecrated as James II, Metropolitan of Jerusalem and Archbishop of all Palestine, Philadelphia of Jordan, and all the Near East, by the hands of Pope Joseph II and the Bishops and Metropolitans of the Holy Synod.

Although the Archdiocese of Jerusalem had traditionally incorporated the eastern most provinces of Egypt, Al-Sharqyia, Port Said, Ismailia, and Suez, its borders were augmented following the death of Metropolitan Theophilus of Jerusalem, Metropolitan James II's predecessor, and these regions were cleaved off into their own diocese. Thus, they were not included in Metropolitan James II's jurisdiction.

=== Service ===
Immediately after his consecration he began to work tirelessly in improving the conditions for both the resident Copts of the Holy Land, as well as the pilgrims. In 1946, he constructed the Coptic Monastery of Saint John the Baptist, on the banks of the Jordan. This monastery included a church, as well as lodging rooms for pilgrims. The land on which the monastery was built had been purchased by Metropolitan Theophilus, however, he died before he could utilize it.

In 1947, he opened the Antonine Coptic College, for the purpose of educating the Coptic Community of the Holy Land, as well as all the other Palestinian Communities. In that year he also consecrated a Church to serve the community in Rafah.

In 1949, he laid the corner stone for the Church of the Virgin Mary and the Annunciation, Nazareth. He purchased more land in Nazareth in 1951, in order to expand the Church's projects and spiritual activities.

In 1952, he began publishing a magazine titled "Saint Mark's Renaissance (Arabic: النهضة المرقسية)". In that year he also purchased some land and homes in Bethlehem, in anticipation for the construction of a Coptic monastery, and church adjacent to the Church of the Nativity.

== Death ==
On March 22, 1956, he died in a train crash on route to Asyut alongside Metropolitan Thomas of Gharbia. He was buried at a property belonging to the Monastery of Saint Anthony the Great, in Bush. Following his death, the See of Jerusalem remained vacant for three years, due to a vacancy on the Papal See.

Oriental Orthodox titles
Preceded by Theophilus	Coptic Metropolitan of Jerusalem; 1946-1956	Succeeded by Basil IV
