= Basil III =

Basil III may refer to:

- Vasily III of Moscow, grand prince from 1505 to 1535
- Basil III of Constantinople, patriarch from 1925 to 1929
- Basil III (Coptic archbishop of Jerusalem) (r. 1925–1935)
