= Theophilus (Coptic archbishop of Jerusalem) =

Coptic Metropolitan of Jerusalem

His Eminence Theophilus
- Metropolitan of the Holy and Great City of Our Lord, Jerusalem (Holy Zion), and Archbishop of the Holy and Ancient Archdiocese of Jerusalem, all Palestine and the Near East; Abbot of the Monasteries of Saint Anthony, and Saint George, Jerusalem.
- Native name: (Arabic: الانبا ثاؤفيلس, Coptic: Ⲁⲃⲃⲁ Ⲑⲉⲟ́ⲫⲓⲗⲟⲩⲥ)
- Church: Coptic Orthodox Church
- Archdiocese: Coptic Orthodox Archdiocese of Jerusalem
- Metropolis: Jerusalem
- Predecessor: Basil III
- Successor: James II

Orders
- Consecration: 19 May 1935 by Pope John XIX
- Rank: Metropolitan Archbishop

Personal details
- Born: 1893 Al-Manahre, Matai, Minya, Egypt
- Died: 1 October 1945 (aged 51–52)
- Buried: Monastery of Saint Anthony, Red Sea Wilderness

Theophilus, (Arabic: الانبا ثاؤفيلس, Coptic: Ⲁⲃⲃⲁ Ⲑⲉⲟ́ⲫⲓⲗⲟⲩⲥ), was the 18th metropolitan of the Holy and Great City of Our Lord, Jerusalem (Holy Zion), Archbishop of the Holy and Ancient Archdiocese of Jerusalem, all Palestine and the Near East from 1935 until his death in 1945. During his reign, the Archdiocese of Jerusalem also possessed Jurisdiction over the eastern most provinces of Egypt in Al-Sharqyia, Port Said, Ismailia, and Suez. He was also the abbot of the Monasteries of Saint Anthony and Saint George in Jerusalem.

== Early life ==
He was born in the village of El-Manahra, in the District of Matai, Minya Governorate, Egypt, in 1893. He was raised in a religious household, and was taught the orthodox doctrine and the Coptic language from a young age. He was tonsured a Reader in 1902 at the hands of Metropolitan Demetrius of Minya. After completing his education at a Coptic secondary school, he sought out the monastic life.

== Monastic life ==
=== Early service ===
He was tonsured as a monk in the Monastery of Saint Anthony the Great, in the Eastern Desert in 1910, and was given the monastic name, Monk Peter of Saint Anthony (Arabic: أبونا الراهب بطرس الأنطونى). He was ordained to the priesthood in 1915 at the hands of Bishop Mark the abbot of the Monastery. Following his ordination, he was commissioned to serve the Coptic community in Kom Ombo, and the congregation there loved him very much. He oversaw the construction of the Church in that city.

He was elevated to the dignity of Hegumen in 1921, and a year later, in 1922, he was appointed as the abbot of the Monastery of Saint George in Jerusalem. He was later appointed as deputy for the properties of the Monastery of Saint Anthony in Jerusalem, and Cairo, in the year 1931. Later, in December of the same year, he was appointed as the abbot of the Monastery of Saint Anthony.

=== First papal candidacy ===
Following the death of Pope Cyril V of Alexandria, in 1927, Hegumen Peter of Saint Anthony was nominated for the papacy. There was, however, another monk from the Muharaq Monastery called Yuhanna Salama who was nominated as well; this monk was a notorious British loyalist. King Fuad I, not wanting to risk the appointment of a Coptic Pope with British loyalties, demanded that no Papal elections be held, and that Metropolitan John of Al-Beheira, who was serving as the locum tenens patriarch, be enthroned as the new pope. Not wishing to disobey the King, and feeling tense themselves about the possibility of having a collaborator Pope, the Holy Synod agreed and enthroned Metropolitan John of Al-Beheira as Pope John XIX of Alexandria. This was the first time in the history of the Coptic Church for a diocesan bishop/metropolitan to be enthroned as patriarch, which is in violation of the canons of the Church.

== Episcopate ==
=== Consecration ===
Following the death of Metropolitan Basil III of Jerusalem, in 1935, Hegumen Peter of Saint Anthony was nominated for the see. He was consecrated as Theophilus, Metropolitan of Jerusalem and Archbishop of all Palestine, Philadelphia of Jordan, and all the Near East, by the hands of Pope John XIX and the bishops and metropolitans of the Holy Synod, at Saint Mark's Coptic Orthodox Cathedral, Azbakeya, on Sunday, May 19, 1935.

=== Second papal candidacy ===
Following the death of Pope John XIX, in 1942, Metropolitan Theophilus was once again nominated for the papacy. Once again he was not chosen for the position. This time Metropolitan Macarius of Asyut was chosen as Pope Macarius III of Alexandria. This being the second time a metropolitan is enthroned as patriarch, in violation of the canons of the Church.

=== Continued service ===
As Metropolitan of Jerusalem, he continued the works of renovation and construction of church properties in the Holy Land. He also purchased land on the shores of the Jordan River which was later used for the building of the Monastery of Saint John the Baptist.

== Death ==
On Monday, October 1, 1945, he was shot dead while walking from the Monastery of Saint Anthony the Great in the Eastern Desert, to the nearby village of Bush. The circumstances around his murder were unclear, and the perpetrator remains unknown. He was buried at a property belonging to the Monastery of Saint Anthony the Great, in Bush.

Oriental Orthodox titles
Preceded by Basil III	Coptic Metropolitan of Jerusalem; 1935-1945	Succeeded by James II
