= Orthodoxy in Israel =

The term Orthodoxy in Israel may refer to:

- Orthodox Judaism in Israel, representing adherents, communities and institutions of Orthodox Judaism, in Israel
- Eastern Orthodoxy in Israel, representing adherents, communities and institutions of various Eastern Orthodox Churches, in Israel
- Oriental Orthodoxy in Israel, representing adherents, communities and institutions of various Oriental Orthodox Churches, in Israel

== See also ==
- Orthodoxy (disambiguation)
- Israel (disambiguation)
- Orthodox Church (disambiguation)
