= Abraham II (Coptic archbishop of Jerusalem) =

Coptic archbishop of Jerusalem

His Eminence Abraham II
- Metropolitan of the Holy and Great City of Our Lord, Jerusalem (Holy Zion), and Archbishop of the Holy and Ancient Archdiocese of Jerusalem, all Palestine and the Near East; Abbot of the Monasteries of Saint Anthony, and Saint George, Jerusalem.
- Native name: الأنبا أبراهام
- Church: Coptic Orthodox Church
- Archdiocese: Coptic Orthodox Archdiocese of Jerusalem
- Metropolis: Jerusalem
- Installed: 3 January 1992
- Predecessor: Basil IV
- Successor: Antonius

Orders
- Consecration: 17 February 1991 by Pope Shenouda III
- Rank: Metropolitan Archbishop

Personal details
- Born: 30 June 1943 Al Minshah, Sohag, Egypt
- Died: 25 November 2015 (aged 72) Jerusalem, Palestine
- Education: Cairo University, Theological and Clerical College in Cairo

Abraham (Arabic: الأنبا أبراهام, Coptic: Ⲁⲃⲃⲁ Ⲁⲃⲣⲁϩⲁⲙ), was the 21st Metropolitan of the Holy and Great City of Our Lord, Jerusalem (Holy Zion), and Archbishop of the Holy and Ancient Archdiocese of Jerusalem, all Palestine and the Near East, from 1991, until his death in 2015.

== Early life ==
He was born on June 30, 1943, in Al Minshah, Sohag, Egypt. In 1964, he received a B.S. in Agricultural Sciences from the Faculty of Agriculture, Cairo University. His excellence within this field, led him to complete a M.S. in Herbal Medicine, in 1970, and later, a PhD in the same subject, in 1976. He also received a B.S. in Theology, from the Coptic Theological and Clerical College in Cairo, in 1967. He then continued his theological studies, and earned a M.S. in Theology, from the same institution in 1971.

In 1980, he was appointed to the Pharmaceutical Lab of the National Research Center. He also served as a deacon in the Church of Saint George, in Agouza, and was the Secretary of Service for northern and western Giza. He continued to work and serve in these capacities until his departure to the monastery

== Monastic life ==
On June 5, 1983, he entered the Monastery of Saint Pishoy seeking the monastic life. On February 19, 1984, he was tonsured a monk, and given the monastic name: Monk Sidrak of Saint Psihoy (Arabic: أبونا الراهب سدراك الأنبا بيشوي).

On July 23, 1990, Pope Shenouda III ordained him a priest, and sent him to Switzerland, to serve the Coptic community there. He did not serve in Switzerland for a long time, as in 1991, Pope Shenouda III recalled him to Cairo, and elevated him to the dignity of Hegumen, in preparation for his consecration as Metropolitan Archbishop of Jerusalem.

== Episcopate ==
On November 17, 1991, he was consecrated as Abraham II, Metropolitan of Jerusalem and Archbishop of all Palestine, Philadelphia of Jordan, and all the Near East, at the hands of Pope Shenouda III, and the bishops and metropolitans of the Holy Synod. He was enthroned in Jerusalem on January 3, 1992. During his time as Metropolitan of Jerusalem, he undertook numerous restorations of the Coptic possessions there, and also built more service buildings such as the new Antonine College campus.

During his episcopate, he was a member of the Holy Synod's Monasteries and Monastic Affairs Committee.

== Death ==
He reposed early in the morning on November 25, 2015, after a reign of 24 years. Funerary rites were carried out on November 28, 2015, by Pope Tawadros II, and the bishops and metropolitans of the Holy Synod, and he was buried in Jerusalem, as he had directed in his last will and testament. This was the first time the Coptic Pope had made an official visit to Jerusalem, since the Coptic Orthodox Church banned pilgrimage to the city in 1967, in solidarity with Palestine. Coptic Church spokesmen, later clarified that the Coptic Church has not changed its position, and that pilgrimages are still banned, explaining that the Pope's visit was an exception made strictly for the purpose of fulfilling Metropolitan Abraham II's last will and testament, in which he requested to be buried in Jerusalem.

Oriental Orthodox titles
Preceded by Basil IV	Coptic Metropolitan of Jerusalem; 1991–2015	Succeeded by Antonius
