= Oriental Orthodoxy in Israel =

Israeli Oriental Orthodox Christians
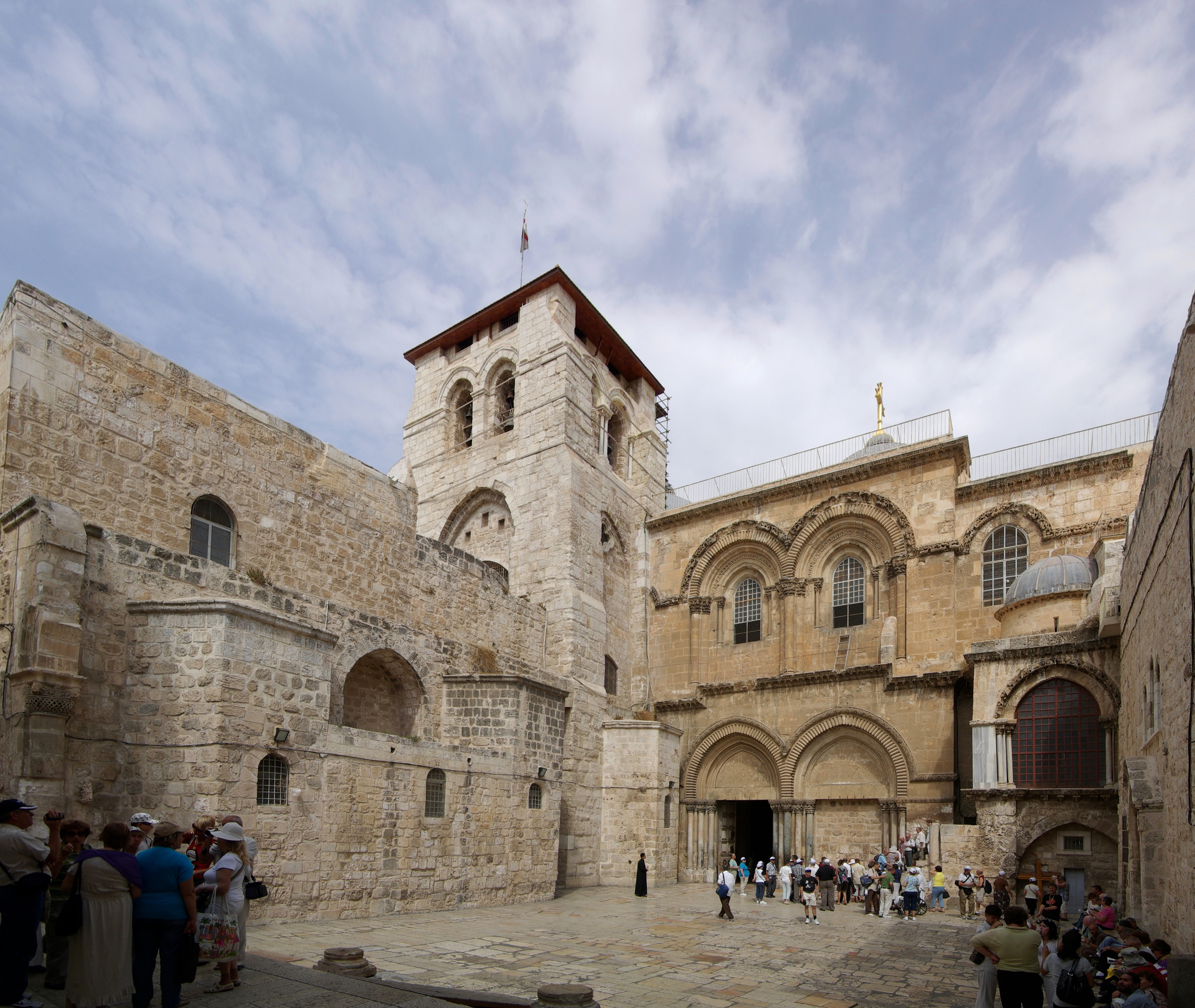
- Church of the Holy Sepulchre, one of the holiest sites of Christianity

Total population
- 38,000 (estimate)

Regions with significant populations
- Jerusalem, Jaffa, Bethlehem

Languages
- Arabic, English, Hebrew, Modern Aramaic, Ge'ez, Coptic

The Oriental Orthodox Churches (Hebrew: הנצרות האורתודוקסית המזרחית; Arabic: المسيحية الأرثوذكسية الشرقية) in Israel traditionally date back to Christ's ministry in Judaea and have had an established presence within the land for over a millennium. Oriental Orthodoxy is maintained through strong communities of Armenians, Copts, Assyrians, Ethiopians, and Eritreans both historically and in the modern day numbering tens of thousands.

== Contemporary status ==
A large number of Churches and Monasteries serve the Orthodox community in Israel. The Armenian and Syriac Churches are some of the oldest and more established Churches in the country, especially in Jerusalem where an Armenian Quarter exists highlighting the extent of this historic basis. As of date, there are churches all over Israel representing various communities, and are often under the Coptic Orthodox Archdiocese of Jerusalem, the Syriac Orthodox Archdiocese of Jerusalem, or the Armenian Patriarchate of Jerusalem.

Oriental Orthodoxy is recognised by Israel, specifically the Syriac and Armenian Churches who are registered and represented in the State. The Tewahedo Churches and the Coptic Church, while not officially a part of Israel's confessional system which allows for self-regulation and formal affairs, still receive equal rights and their adherents are free to exercise and practice the faith as they please and without any other restriction.

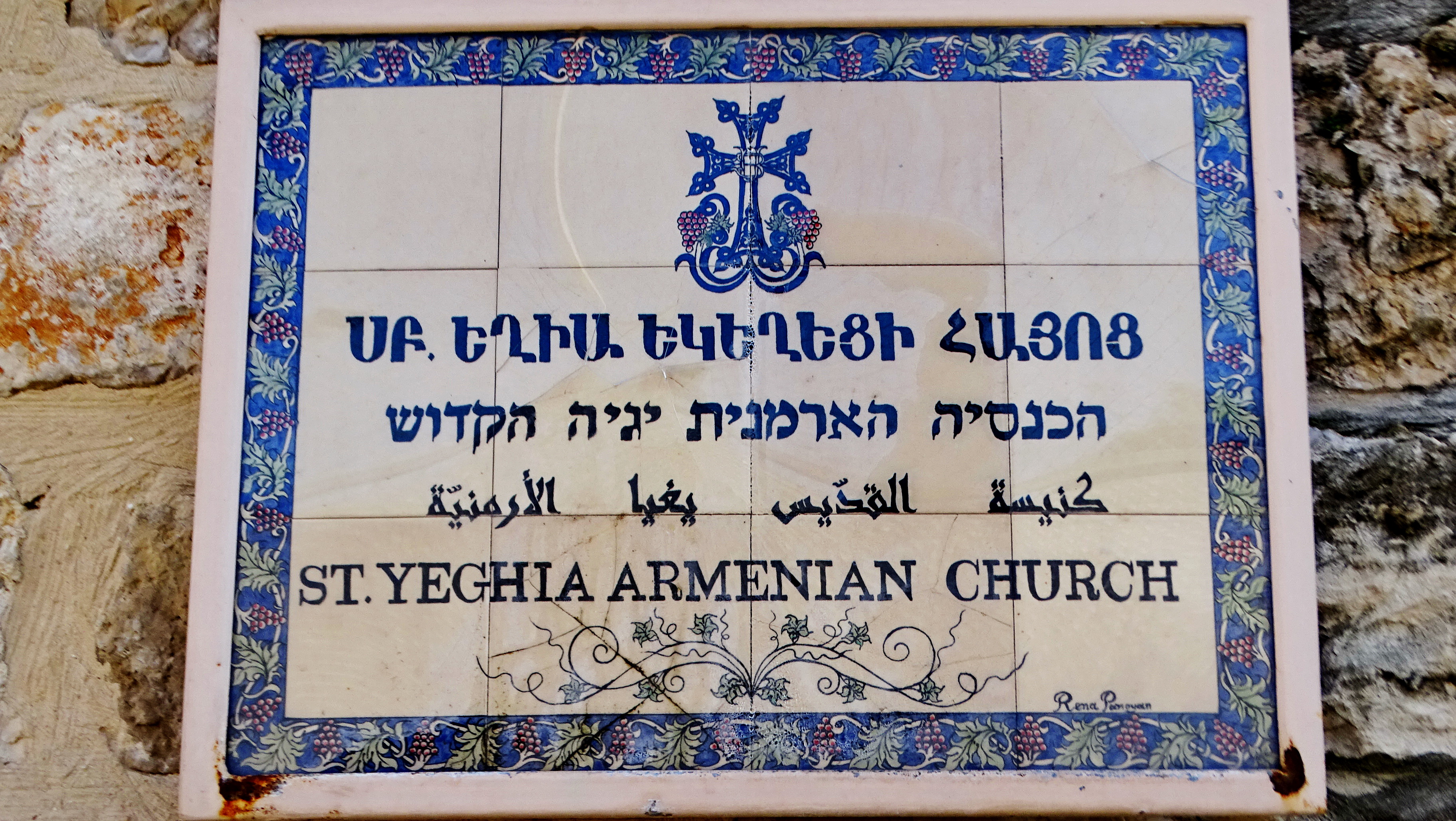
A Sign found in the Armenian Church of St Elijah in Haifa

As with other Christians in Israel, Orthodox Christians are highly educated and have high representation in white collar and scientific professions, excelling both in education and the workplace. The largest community of Orthodox Christians in Israel are found in Jerusalem, Jericho, Bethlehem, and Jaffa.

== See also ==
- Catholicism in Israel
- Christianity in Israel
