= Kidane Mehret Church, Jerusalem =

Ethiopian church in Jerusalem

Coordinates: 31.7849709°N 35.22109225°E

Kidane Mehret Church
- ኪዳነ ምሕረት ቤተክርስቲያን
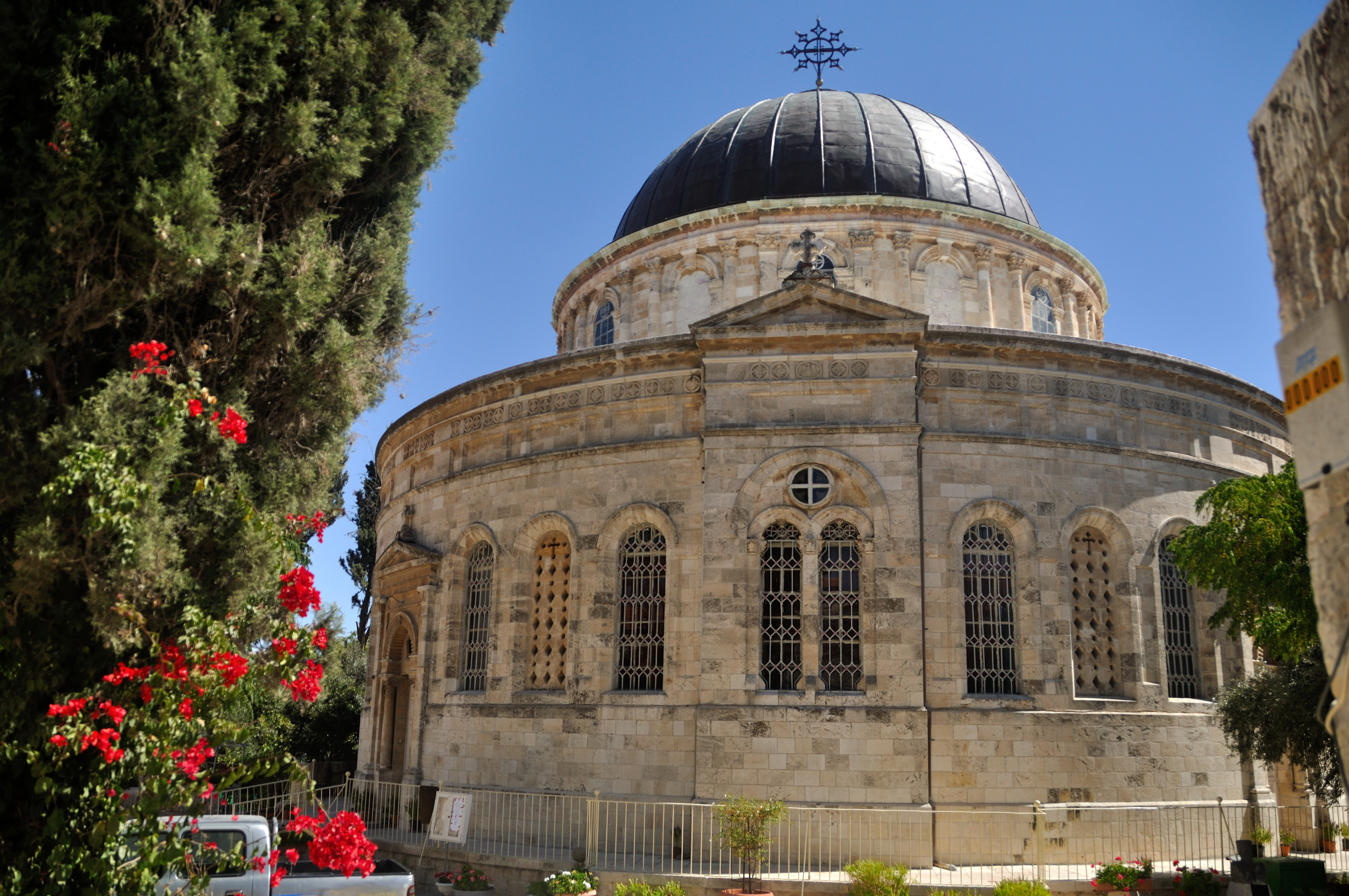
- Kidane Mehret Church
- Location: Jerusalem
- Denomination: Oriental Orthodox
- Churchmanship: Ethiopian Orthodox Tewahedo Church

Architecture
- Groundbreaking: 1888 (?)
- Completed: 1893

Specifications
- Height: c. 30 m (98 ft)

The Kidane Mehret Church (Ge'ez for "Covenant of Mercy") in Jerusalem, popularly known simply as the Ethiopian Church, is part of the Debre Genet (ደብረ ገነት) monastery, whose name means "Monastery of Paradise".

The monastery and its church belong to the Ethiopian Orthodox Tewahedo Church. It is one of two Ethiopian monasteries in Jerusalem, along with Deir Sultan, Debre Genet being located in West Jerusalem and Deir Sultan in the Old City.

== Etymology ==
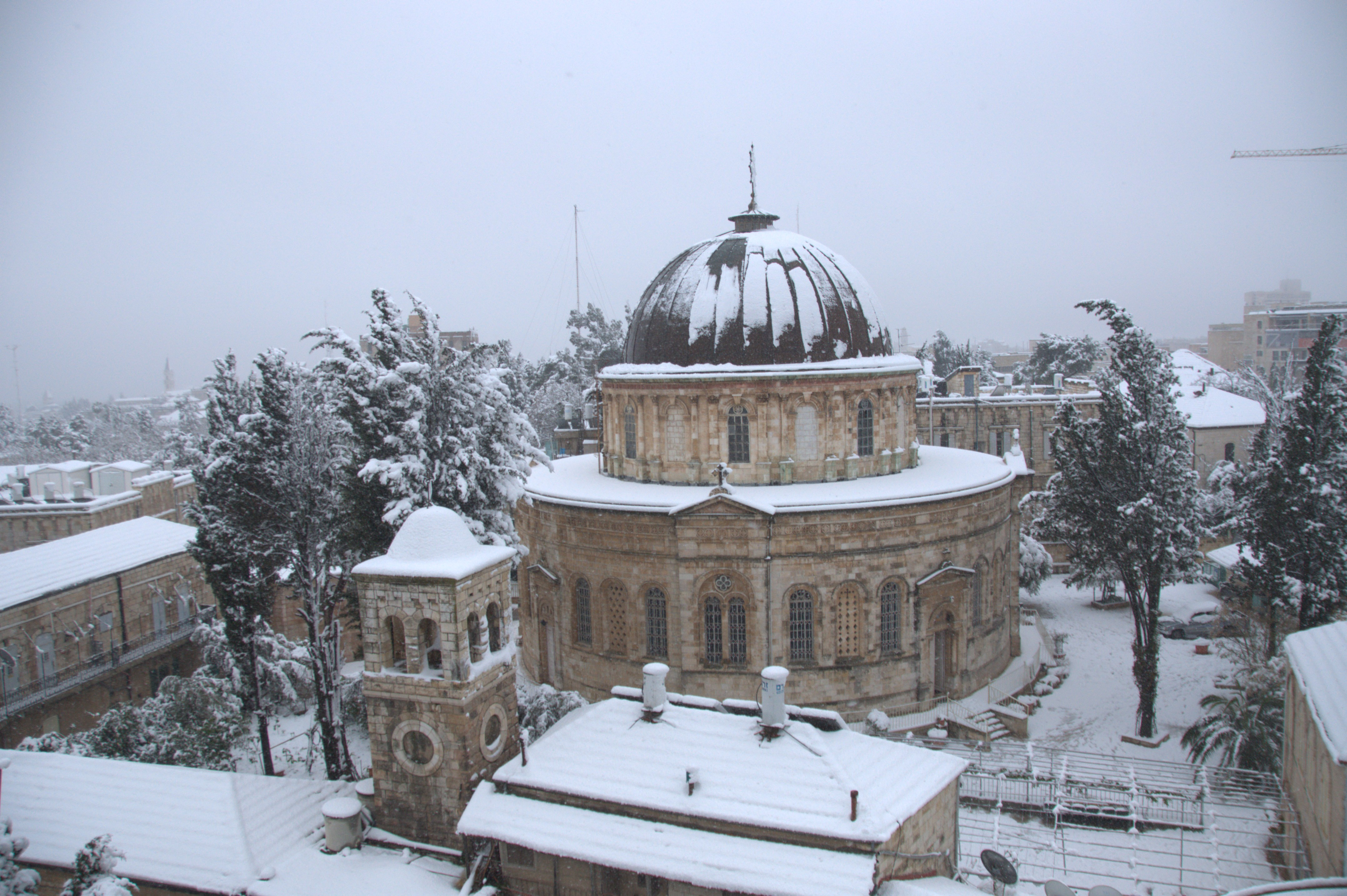
Winter view of the church

Kidane Mehret (ኪዳነ ምሕረት) is a Ge'ez phrase meaning Covenant of Mercy. It refers to the Ethiopic tradition that Jesus promised his mother that he would forgive the sins of those who sought her intercession.

The feast of Our Lady of the Covenant of Mercy is celebrated on 16 Yekatit (Ethiopian calendar), corresponding at present to 24 February (Gregorian calendar) except in leap years, when it corresponds to 25 February, since in the Ethiopian calendar the extra day is inserted in what for the Gregorian calendar is the preceding month of September.

== History ==
Emperor of Ethiopia Yohannes IV (r. 1872–1889) used war booty won in his conflict with Egypt to purchase land to the north of the Old City of Jerusalem in 1888. The next year Yohannes died in battle and was followed by Emperor Menelik II (r. 1889–1913). The church was inaugurated in 1893.

== Description ==
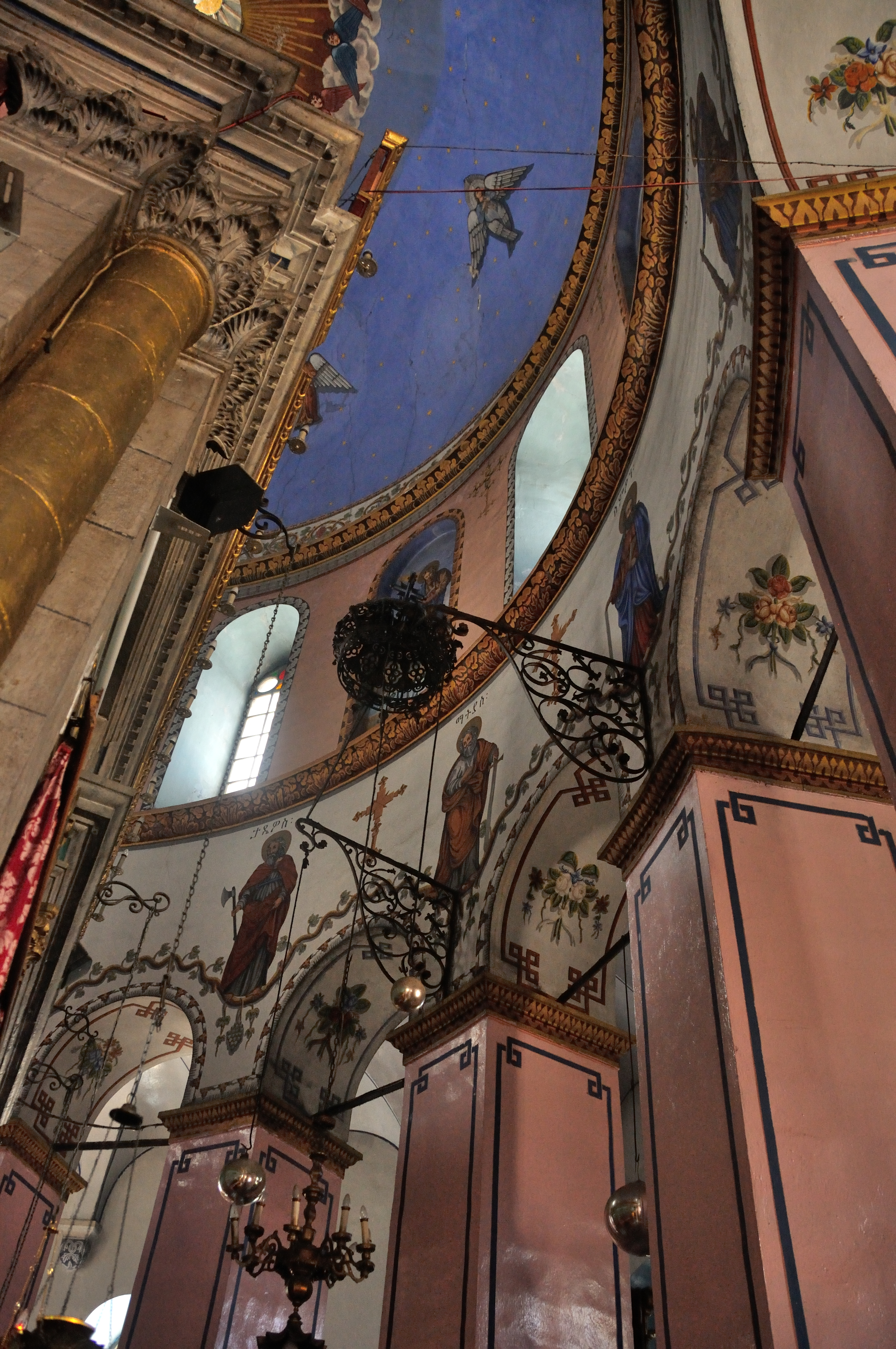
Interior of the Kidane Mehret Church

The Kidane Mehret Church in Jerusalem is round in shape with a dome of some 30 metres in height.

As in most Ethiopian churches, the interior consists of three concentric rings. In the centre is the square mekdes (መቅደስ), "sanctuary", also called the kidist qiddusan (ቅድስተ ቅዱሳን), "Holy of Holies", which only priests and deacons may enter and which contains the tabot, the tablet over which the Eucharist is celebrated. Around this is the circular part known as kidist (ቅድስት), "holy", intended for those able to receive holy communion. The outer circular ring, the qne mahilet (ቅኔ ማሕሌት) is for the cantors and is accessible by the faithful generally.

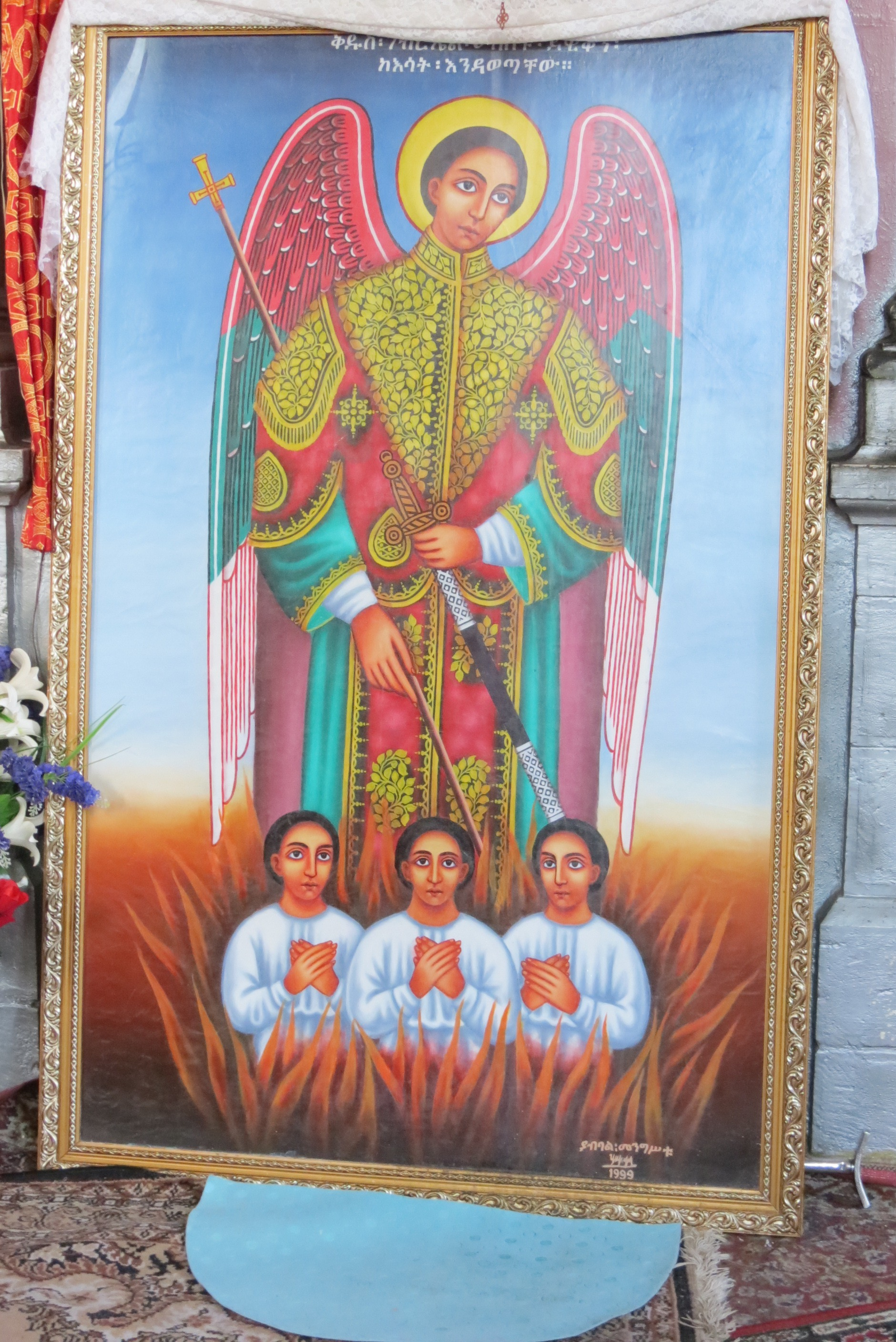
Icon Depicting Gabriel Protecting the Three Holy Youths

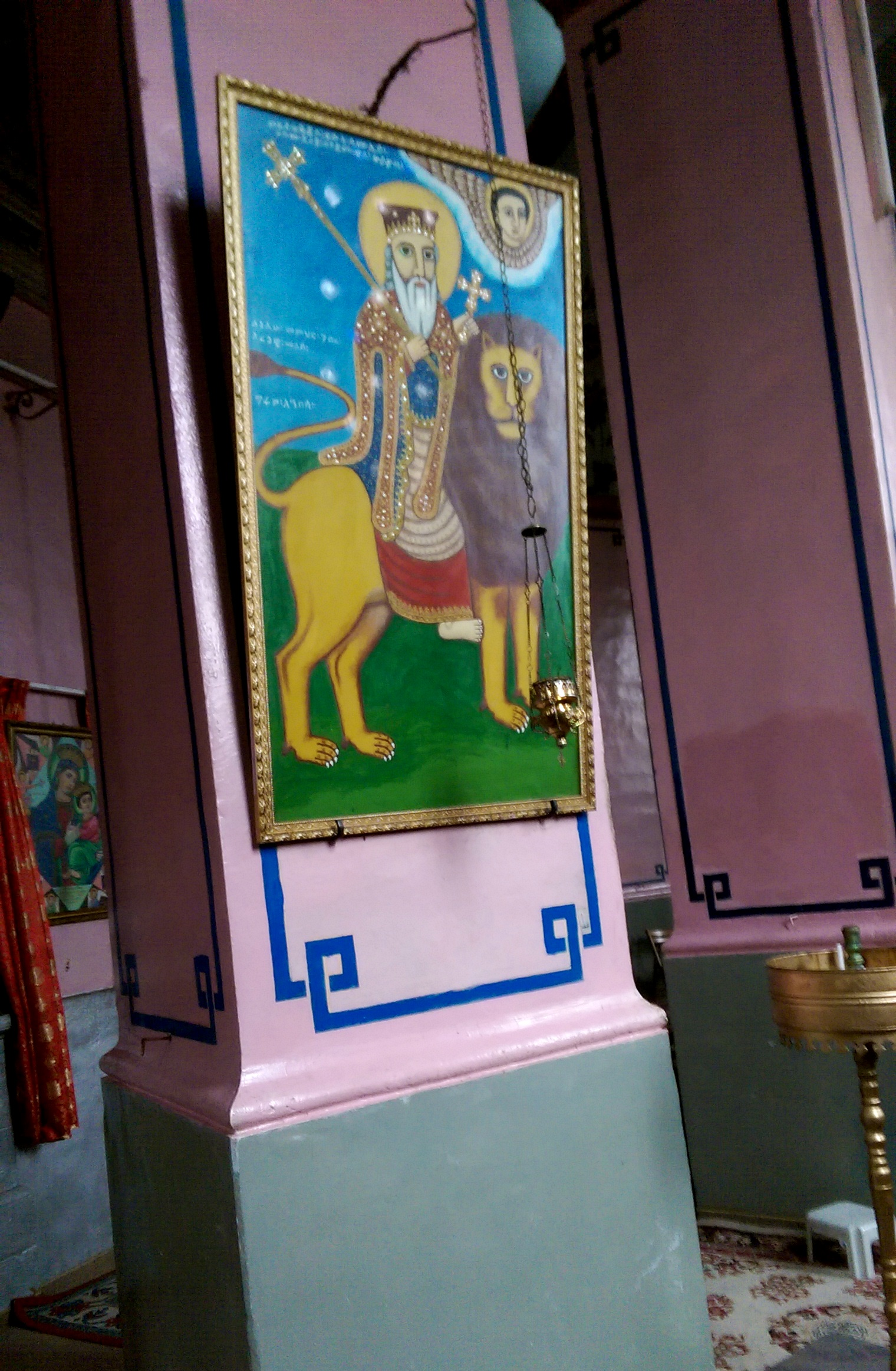
Icon Depicting Samuel of Waldebba, with Michael guiding him.

== See also ==
- Deir es-Sultan, the other Ethiopian Orthodox monastery of Jerusalem
- Ethiopian Orthodox Tewahedo Church
- Oriental Orthodox Churches
