= Antonius (Coptic archbishop of Jerusalem) =

Egyptian archbishop

His Eminence Antonius
- Metropolitan of the Holy and Great City of Our Lord, Jerusalem (Holy Zion), and Archbishop of the Holy and Ancient Archdiocese of Jerusalem, all Palestine and the Near East; Abbot of the Monasteries of Saint Anthony, and Saint George, Jerusalem.
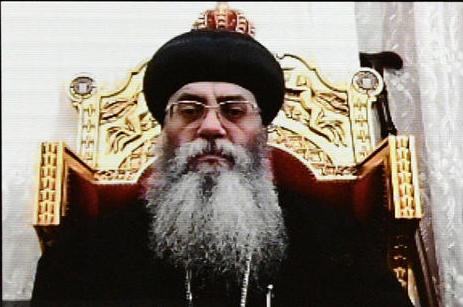
- Native name: الأنبا أنطونيوس
- Church: Coptic Orthodox Church
- Archdiocese: Coptic Orthodox Archdiocese of Jerusalem
- Metropolis: Jerusalem
- Installed: 5 March 2016
- Predecessor: Abraham II

Orders
- Consecration: 28 February 2016 by Pope Tawadros II
- Rank: Metropolitan Archbishop

Personal details
- Born: Emad Timotheos Sharmokh (Arabic: عماد القمص تيموثاوس شرموخ); 25 July 1969 (age 56) Abu Tig, Asyut, Egypt
- Profession: Pharmacist
- Education: B.S. in Agricultural Sciences, B.S. in Pharmaceutical Sciences, B.A. in Theology
- Alma mater: Assiut University, Mansoura University

Antonius (Arabic: الأنبا أنطونيوس,Coptic: Ⲁⲃⲃⲁ Ⲁⲛⲧⲱⲛⲓⲟⲥ), is the 22nd Metropolitan of the Holy and Great City of Our Lord, Jerusalem (Holy Zion), and Archbishop of the Holy and Ancient Archdiocese of Jerusalem, all Palestine and the Near East. He is also the Abbot of the Monastery of Saint Anthony, Jerusalem, and the Monastery of Saint George, Jerusalem.

== Early life ==
He was born Emad Timotheos Sharmokh (Arabic: عماد القمص تيموثاوس شرموخ), in Abu Tig, Asyut, Egypt, on July 25, 1969. His father is Hegumen Timotheos Sharmokh, the vicar for the Diocese of Abu Tig. His two younger brothers were also later ordained priests in the Diocese of Abu Tig.

He received a B.S. in Agricultural Science from Assiut University, and a second B.S. in Pharmaceutical Sciences from Mansoura University. He went on to work as a pharmacist before pursuing the monastic life.

== Monastic life ==
He entered the Monastery of Saint Anthony, in 2004, and was tonsured a monk there on December 27, 2006, under the name Theodore (Arabic: ثيؤدور,Coptic: Ⲑⲉⲟ́ⲇⲱⲣⲟⲥ). He was later ordained a priest in 2013.

In 2014, he was chosen by Pope Tawadros II, among two other monks, to go study theology in Greece. He completed the four-year program even after he was recalled early in 2016, in order to be consecrated as Metropolitan Archbishop of the See of Jerusalem. He was elevated to the dignity of Hegumen on Sunday, February 21, 2016, in preparation for his consecration.

== Consecration as Metropolitan Archbishop ==
On Sunday, February 28, 2016, he was consecrated as Antonius, Metropolitan of Jerusalem and Archbishop of all Palestine, Philadelphia of Jordan, and all the Near East, by Pope Tawadros II, and the bishops and metropolitans of the Holy Synod, in the Saint Mark's Coptic Orthodox Cathedral, Azbakeya (the old See of the Patriarchate of Alexandria). He was given the name Antonius, in honor of the patron Saint of his Monastery, Saint Anthony the Great. The ceremony couldn't be held at the current See of the Patriarchate of Alexandria, Saint Mark's Coptic Orthodox Cathedral, Abbassia, due to the renovations that were taking place there at the time in preparation for the celebration of its 50th anniversary.

On Saturday, March 5, 2016, he was enthroned as the 22nd Coptic Metropolitan of Jerusalem, and all the Near East. He was lead with a great procession through the Jaffa Gate of the Old City, and the Church of the Holy Sepulchre, visiting and venerating many of the Holy Sites therein. The procession ended in the Monastery of Saint Anthony, Jerusalem, (the headquarters of the Coptic Orthodox Archdiocese of Jerusalem) where he was installed on the throne by numerous other Metropolitans of the Coptic Orthodox Church.

Oriental Orthodox titles
Preceded by Abraham II	Coptic Metropolitan of Jerusalem; 2016–present	Incumbent
