= Coptic Orthodox Archdiocese of Jerusalem =

Metropolitan Archdiocese of the Coptic Orthodox Church

The Holy and Ancient Archdiocese of Jerusalem, All Palestine, and All the Near East
- Archbishopric

Oriental Orthodox
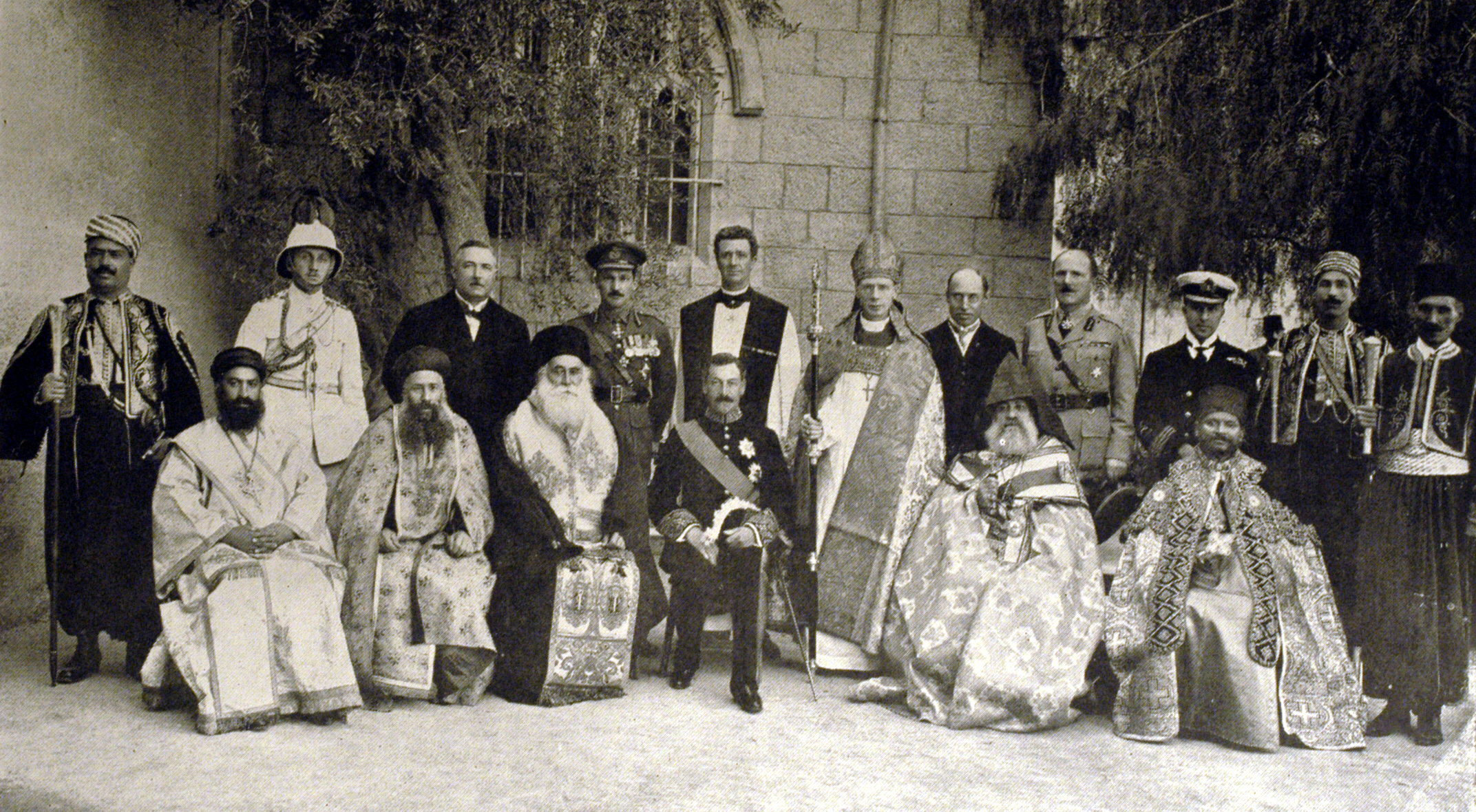
- Leaders of the Jerusalem church, Palestine in 1922

Location
- Territory: Palestine, Kuwait, Jordan, Syria, Lebanon, and Iraq
- Metropolitan: Jerusalem
- Headquarters: Saint Anthony Coptic Orthodox Monastery

Information
- Denomination: Coptic Orthodox
- Rite: Alexandrian
- Established: 1236 A.D.

Current leadership
- Pope: Tawadros II
- Metropolitan Archbishop: Antonius

Website
- copticj.com

The Holy and Ancient Archdiocese of Jerusalem, All Palestine, and All the Near East or the Coptic Orthodox Patriarchate in Jerusalem (Arabic: بطريركية الاقباط الأرثوذكس بالقدس أبرشية أورشليم المقدسة وكل فلسطين وكل الشرق الأدنى Baṭriyarkeyat al-Aqbāṭ al-Urtūdoks bi al-Quds;; Coptic: ⲡⲓⲙⲁⲙⲡⲁⲧⲣⲓⲁⲣⲭⲏⲥ ⲛⲧⲉ ⲓⲗⲏⲙ ⲛⲣⲉⲙⲛⲭⲏⲙⲓ ⲛⲟⲣⲑⲟⲇⲟⲝⲟⲥ), is a Metropolitan Archdiocese of the Coptic Orthodox Church, which is part of the wider communion of the Oriental Orthodox Churches. It is headed by the Coptic Orthodox Metropolitan Archbishop of Jerusalem and All Palestine, the incumbent being Metropolitan Archbishop Antonious of Jerusalem since 2016. Its jurisdiction covers those Coptic Orthodox Christians living in the Near East; with churches and monasteries in Palestine, Kuwait, Jordan, Lebanon, Syria, and Iraq. The adherents are largely of Coptic Egyptian descent, mainland Coptic migrants and their descendants. The archdiocese is based at St Anthony's Monastery, in the Christian Quarter of the Old City of Jerusalem, beside the Church of the Holy Sepulchre.

== History ==
During the high Middle Ages, trade routes connected Egypt with the Near East and many Coptic merchants ended up settling there. By the start of the 13th century, the Coptic Church had come to possess an altar adjacent to the Holy Sepulcher, the Monastery of Deir el-Sultan in Jerusalem, and a few churches in Jerusalem, Gaza, and Damascus.

The Coptic possessions and congregants present within the near east – although they belonged to the Coptic Orthodox Church and the See of Alexandria – were seen to be present within the jurisdiction of the See of Antioch, and thus they were pastorally ministered to by the Syriac Orthodox Church. However, in later years, a tradition developed for the Coptic Bishop of Damietta to visit Jerusalem annually during the Feast of the Resurrection and to celebrate the feast with the Copts who lived there. This helped maintain a connection between these Coptic expatriates in Jerusalem and the Coptic Church in Egypt. Following the departure of the Syriac Orthodox Archbishop of Jerusalem Ignatius Sahdo, a long period of vacancy began, in which there was no Syriac claimant to the throne of Jerusalem, and thus, no local Oriental Orthodox Bishop to shepherd the congregation. This vacancy in Syriac succession would last for a majority of the 13th century, from c. 1210 – c. 1290.

At the start of his reign, Pope Cyril III "ibn Laqlaq", the 75th Patriarch of Alexandria, undertook sweeping reforms of the hierarchy of the Coptic Orthodox Church in order to consolidate papal power. These reforms included moving the Patriarchal throne to the Church of Archangel Michael on the Roda Island, re-delegating jurisdiction over all the monasteries to himself, and curtailing the influence of the diocesan bishops. After noticing the vacancy in the See of Jerusalem, he saw in it an opportunity to expand his jurisdiction, and decided to ordain a coptic bishop to the throne. In 1236 A.D. he consecrated Metropolitan Archbishop Basil I to serve as the Metropolitan of Jerusalem and Archbishop of the Near East.

Since the See of Jerusalem was under the jurisdiction of the See of Antioch, this ordination was seen by many within the Coptic Church as a break with tradition, and an overstepping of jurisdiction. Many of the leaders of the Coptic Church also objected, fearing that it would cause a division between the sister churches of Antioch and Alexandria. When news of the appointment reached Patriarch Ignatius III David of Antioch, he was extremely angered and saddened, and a diplomatic crisis between the Coptic and Syriac churches ensued. This crisis was a very rare incident between the two churches, as in general they have maintained good relations through the centuries.

== Liturgical seniority ==
The Holy and Ancient Archdiocese of Jerusalem, All Palestine, and All the Near East, holds a special status of seniority of honor and precedence. This great archdiocesan metropolis is technically outside the Egyptian province and is not considered to be within the jurisdiction of the See of Alexandria, but is simply a foreign possession of the Coptic Orthodox Church. For this reason, its primate is seen as second in rank to the Pope of Alexandria alone, and having seniority over all other hierarchs of the church.

The esteem afforded to the primate of this See is also reflected in the process of his consecration. While the traditions of the Coptic Orthodox Church mandate that one must be consecrated as a diocesan bishop, and serve in this capacity for a time, prior to their elevation to the rank of metropolitan bishop, the primate of the Archdiocese of Jerusalem, All Palestine, and All the Near East, is consecrated as a metropolitan archbishop, without having to serve as a diocesan bishop first. This has been the case since Cyril III consecrated Metropolitan Archbishop Basil I as the first Coptic Orthodox Metropolitan Archbishop of Jerusalem and All the Near East.

== Jurisdiction ==
=== Modern jurisdiction ===
The modern jurisdiction of the Holy and Ancient Archdiocese of Jerusalem, All Palestine, and All the Near East includes:

- The Holy and Ancient Archdiocese of Jerusalem, and all Palestine
  - Comprising the modern-day countries of Palestine, and Israel.
- The Holy Suffragan Diocese of Philadelphia of Jordan, and all Jordan
  - Comprising the modern-day country of Jordan.
- The Holy Suffragan Diocese of Lebanon and Greater Mesopotamia
  - Comprising the modern-day countries of Lebanon, Syria, Iraq, and Kuwait.

=== Possessions and institutions of the archdiocese ===
The Holy and Ancient Archdiocese of Jerusalem, All Palestine, and All the Near East currently maintains total or partial ownership of the following churches, monasteries, holy sites, and institutions:

==== In Israel/Palestine ====
The following sites are fully in the possession the Coptic Orthodox Archdiocese of Jerusalem:

- Monastery of Saint Anthony, Jerusalem
  - Adjacent to the northern wall of the Church of the Holy Sepulchre complex in the Old City of Jerusalem. It currently serves as the headquarters of the archdiocese/patriarchate.
  - The patriarchate complex includes five churches:
    - St Anthony's Church: the main church of the monastery.
    - St Bishoy's Church: inside the monastery.
    - St Mary's Church: inside the monastery.
    - St Helena's Church (Queen Helen Coptic Orthodox Church): at the entrance of the complex, with a belowground cistern. (Not to be confused with St. Helena's Chapel, a nearby belowground Armenian chapel within the Holy Sepulchre Church.)
    - St Jacob's Church: beneath the complex.
- Monastery of the Sultan (Deir el-Sultan), Jerusalem
  - On top of the roof of the Armenian Chapel of St Helena (which is underground, so this monastery is ground-level). It serves as a passageway connecting St Anthony's Monastery to the Church of the Holy Sepulcher.
  - In recent years, a dispute over the ownership of the monastery has erupted between the Coptic Orthodox Archdiocese of Jerusalem and the Ethiopian Orthodox Church.
- Chapel of the Virgin Mary (the "Coptic Chapel", or the "Chapel of the Copts"), Jerusalem
  - Inside the Church of the Holy Sepulchre complex, attached to the back of the shrine of the tomb of Christ.
- Convent and Church of Saint George the Roman, Jerusalem
  - Near the Jaffa Gate in the Old City of Jerusalem. The premise also includes St. Dimiana's Coptic College.
- Convent and Church of the Virgin Mary, Bethlehem
  - Close to the Church of the Nativity in Bethlehem.
- Copts Ascent, Jerusalem
  - A street with pilgrims' housing (the Coptic Khan) in the Old City of Jerusalem.
- Monastery and Church of Saint Anthony, Joppa
  - In Old Jaffa (Joppa) in modern-day Tel-Aviv. Used to serve as a way station for Coptic pilgrims who arrive by boat at the port of Joppa on their way to Jerusalem.
- Monastery and Church of Saint Anthony, Jericho
  - In the city of Jericho. Used to serve as a way station for Coptic pilgrims heading up from Jerusalem to the Jordan River.
- Monastery and Church of Saints Zacchaeus and Andrew, Jericho
  - In the city of Jericho. It was built on a piece of land traditionally held to be the place where the house of Saint Zacchaeus, the repentant tax collector, once stood. Early excavations within the monastery also revealed an ancient Byzantine church dedicated to Saint Andrew.
- Monastery and Church of Saint John the Baptist
  - Near the banks of the Jordan River, among other monasteries all built near the traditionally held place of the baptism of Jesus Christ.
- Church of the Virgin Mary and the Annunciation, Nazareth
  - Next to the Basilica of the Annunciation, which is traditionally believed to be built over the house of Virgin Mary, where angel Gabriel appeared to her and announced that she would conceive and bear the Son of God, Jesus – an event known as the Annunciation.
- The Antonine College, Jerusalem

The following sites are in the possession of other Churches, but the Coptic Orthodox Archdiocese of Jerusalem holds some minor rights to them:

- Church of the Sepulchre of Saint Mary, Jerusalem
  - In the Kidron Valley, in the Garden of Gethsemane, at the foot of the Mount of Olives. It is traditionally seen as the tomb where the disciples had lain the body of the Virgin Mary after her death.
- Church of the Nativity, Bethlehem
  - In Bethlehem. It is traditionally believed to contain the cave in which Christ was born.
- Church of the Ascension, Jerusalem
  - On the Mount of Olives. It is traditionally held to be the place from which Jesus Christ ascended.

==== In Kuwait ====
- St. Mark Coptic Orthodox Church, Hawalli
- St. Mary and St. Bishoy Coptic Orthodox Church, Ahmadi

==== In Jordan ====
- St. Anthony Coptic Orthodox Monastery, Madaba
- St. Mary and St. George Coptic Orthodox Church, Amman

==== In Syria ====
- St. George Coptic Orthodox Monastery, Homs

==== In Lebanon ====
- St. Mary and St. Mark Coptic Orthodox Church, Beirut

==== In Iraq ====
- St. Mary and St. Paul Coptic Orthodox Church, Baghdad.

== Archbishops of Jerusalem and the Near East ==
The Holy and Ancient Archdiocese of Jerusalem, All Palestine, and All the Near East has had a total of 22 metropolitan archbishops since its founding in 1236:

1. Basil I (1236-1260)
2. Peter I (1271-1306)
3. Michael (1310-1324)
4. John (1326-1340)
5. Peter II (1341-1362)
6. Zachariah (1575-1600)
7. James I (1604-1628)
8. Christodolus I (1631-1648)
9. Gabriel (1680-1700)
10. Christodolus II (1720-1724)
11. Athanasius (1725-1766)
12. Joseph (1770-1796)
13. Christodolus III (1797-1819)
14. Abraham I (1820-1854)
15. Basil II "The Great" (1856-1899)
16. Timothy (1899-1925)
17. Basil III (1925-1935)
18. Theophilus (1935-1945)
19. James II (1946-1956)
20. Basil IV (1959-1991)
21. Abraham II (1991-2015)
22. Antonius (2016–present)

== See also ==
- Syriac Orthodox Archbishop of Jerusalem
- Greek Orthodox Church of Jerusalem
- Coptic Orthodox Church of Alexandria
- Greek Orthodox Patriarch of Jerusalem
