= Deir es-Sultan =

Monastery in Jerusalem

Deir es-Sultan (lit. "Monastery of the Sultan")
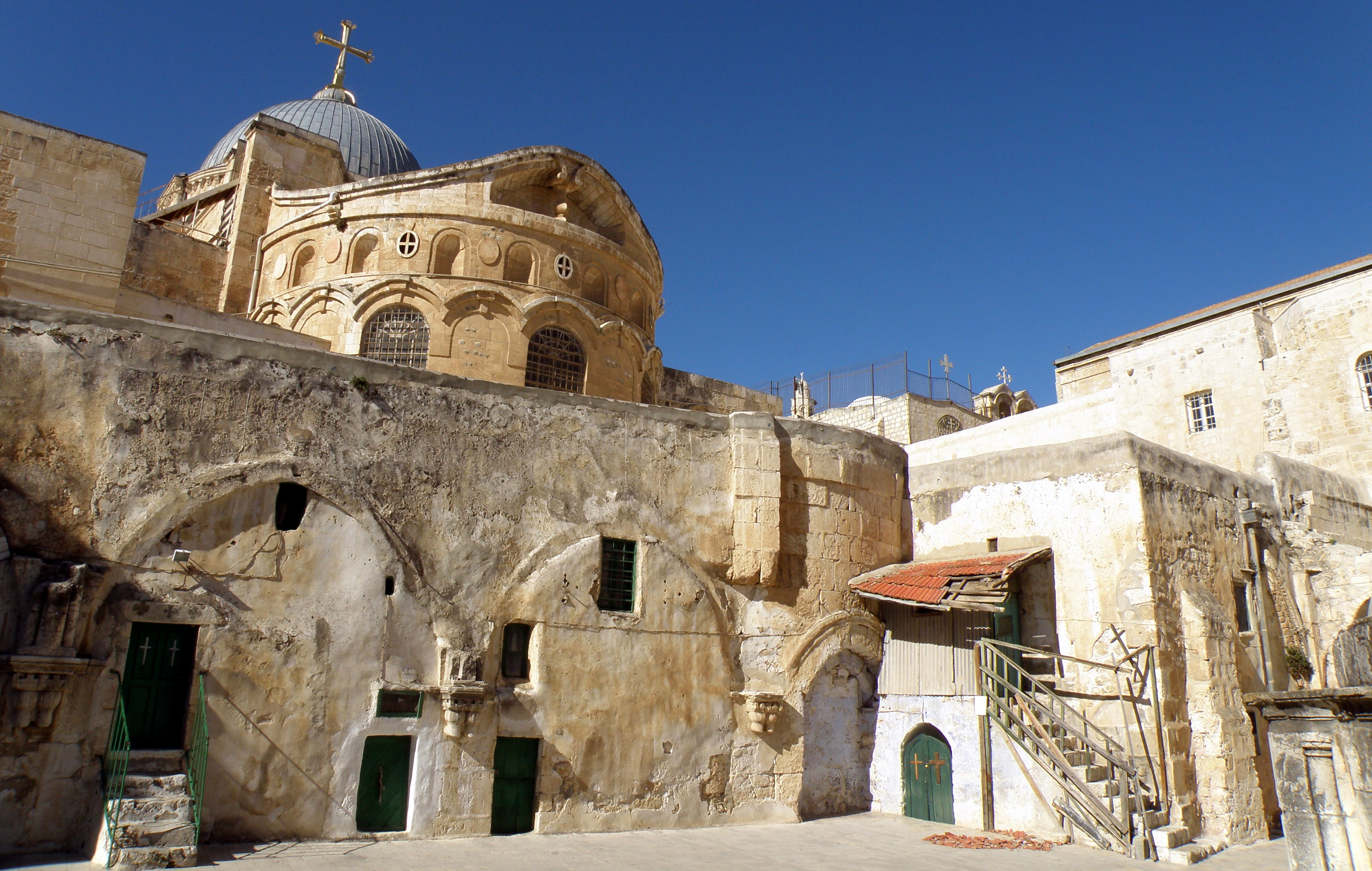

- Location within Jerusalem

Monastery information
- Other name: Deir Al-Sultan
- Established: 335
- Dedication: Archangel Michael & the Four Incorporeal Creatures
- Diocese: Disputed between the Ethiopian Orthodox Tewahedo Church's Archbishopric of Jerusalem and the Coptic Orthodox Archdiocese of Jerusalem

People
- Founder: Constantine the Great

Site
- Location: Old City (Jerusalem)
- Coordinates: 31.778444°N 35.22975°E
- Public access: Yes

Deir es-Sultan, literally the Monastery of the Sultan (Arabic: دير السلطان, romanized: Deir al-Sultan), is an Oriental Orthodox monastery located on the roof of the Chapel of Saint Helena, which is part of the Church of the Holy Sepulchre in Jerusalem's Old City. The Status Quo, a 250-year old understanding between religious communities, applies to the site. Ownership of the monastery is disputed between two churches of the Oriental Orthodox communion, the Coptic Orthodox Church and the Ethiopian Orthodox Tewahedo Church.

== History ==
Deir es-Sultan is one of several holy sites in the area which are contested by various Christian denominations. The monastery is located on the roof of the Helena Chapel, an underground chapel that is part of the Church of the Holy Sepulchre complex, and has an entrance leading down to the Parvis (the Church courtyard). The monastery covers an area of 1,800 square meters.

Ownership is a subject of dispute between the Ethiopian Orthodox Tewahedo Church and the Coptic Orthodox Church of Alexandria.

According to the Coptic Church Umayyad caliph Abd al-Malik ibn Marwan granted the church to the Copts, to be named as "Deir el-Malak" (Angel Monastery), which was later confirmed by Saladin, after it was confiscated by the Crusaders, to be renamed as "Deir es-Sultan". Later on, the Ethiopian monks were hosted by the Copts in 1654, as their churches in Jerusalem were acquired by the Greek and Armenian Churches due to the inability to pay taxes.

In the early 17th century, pretender to the throne Ṣägga Krәstos was hosted at the Ethiopian monastery on Dayr as-Sulṭān. The Ottoman Sultan Abdülhamid II granted the Ethiopians the right to set up a large tent on the roof of the Holy Sepulcher to celebrate Easter.

During the Easter Vigil in the Church of the Holy Sepulcher on April 25, 1970, the Israeli government sent military forces to change the locks of the monastery to enable the Ethiopian monks to take control of it. Afterwards, the Israeli Supreme Court unanimously approved the restoration of the monastery to the Copts on March 16, 1971, yet the government refused to implement the Supreme Court ruling.

In October 2018, a Coptic priest was arrested following protests against the restoration efforts of the monastery without the Coptic Church's consent. In April 2021, "light clashes" erupted between Egyptian and Ethiopian monks, as the latter set a tent and raised the Ethiopian flag inside the monastery. The same incident was repeated a year later on 18 April 2022. In 2022, the same type of event provoked the Coptic monks to paint the flag of Egypt on the main door leading to the monastery, adjacent to the entrance to the Coptic Patriarchate of Jerusalem.

== Gallery ==
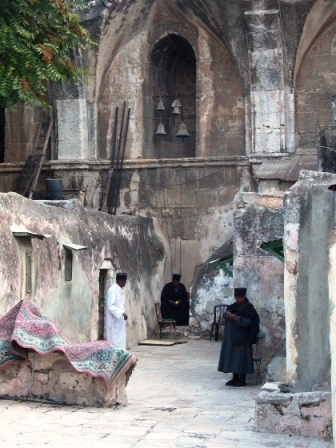

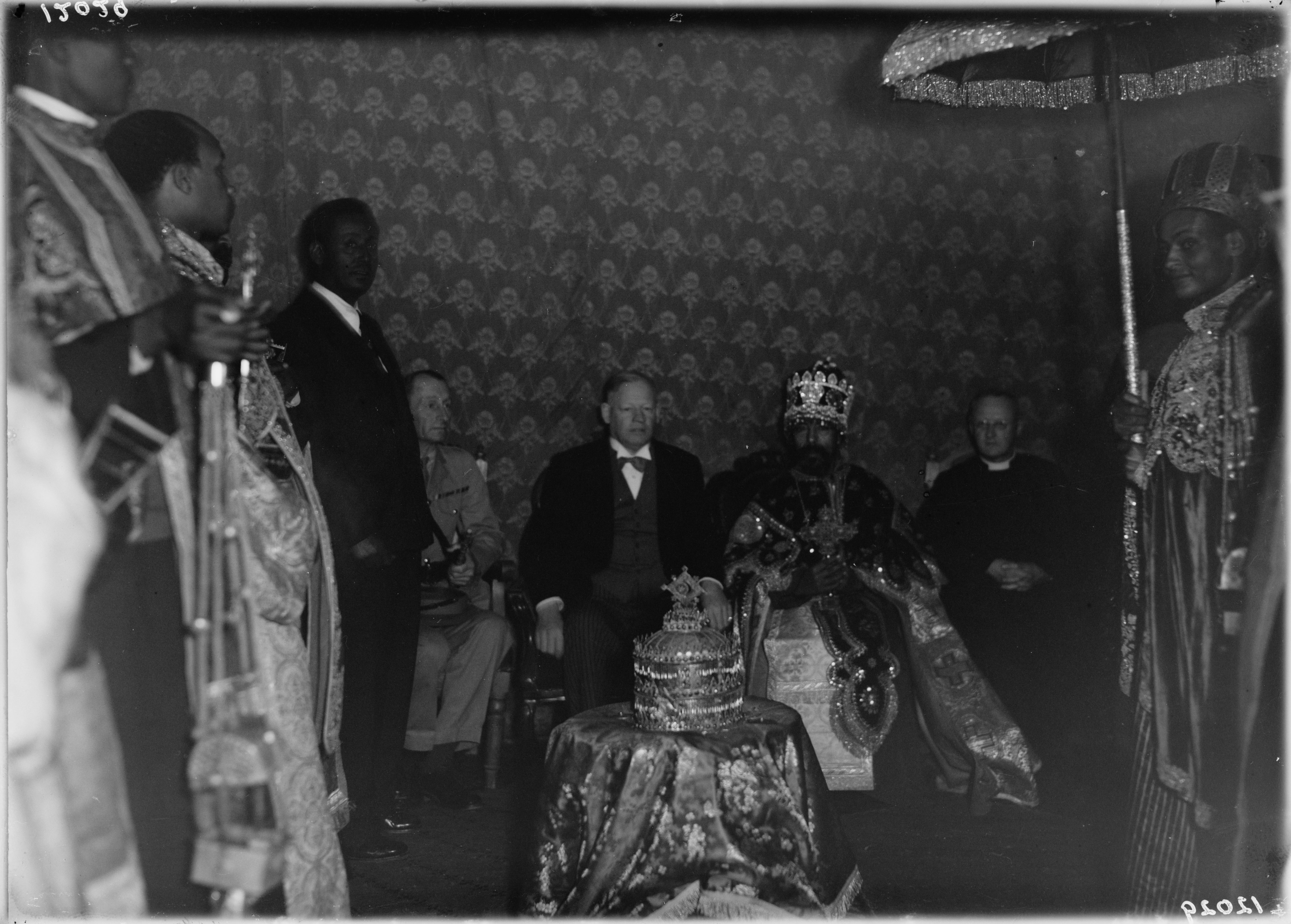
Easter 1941

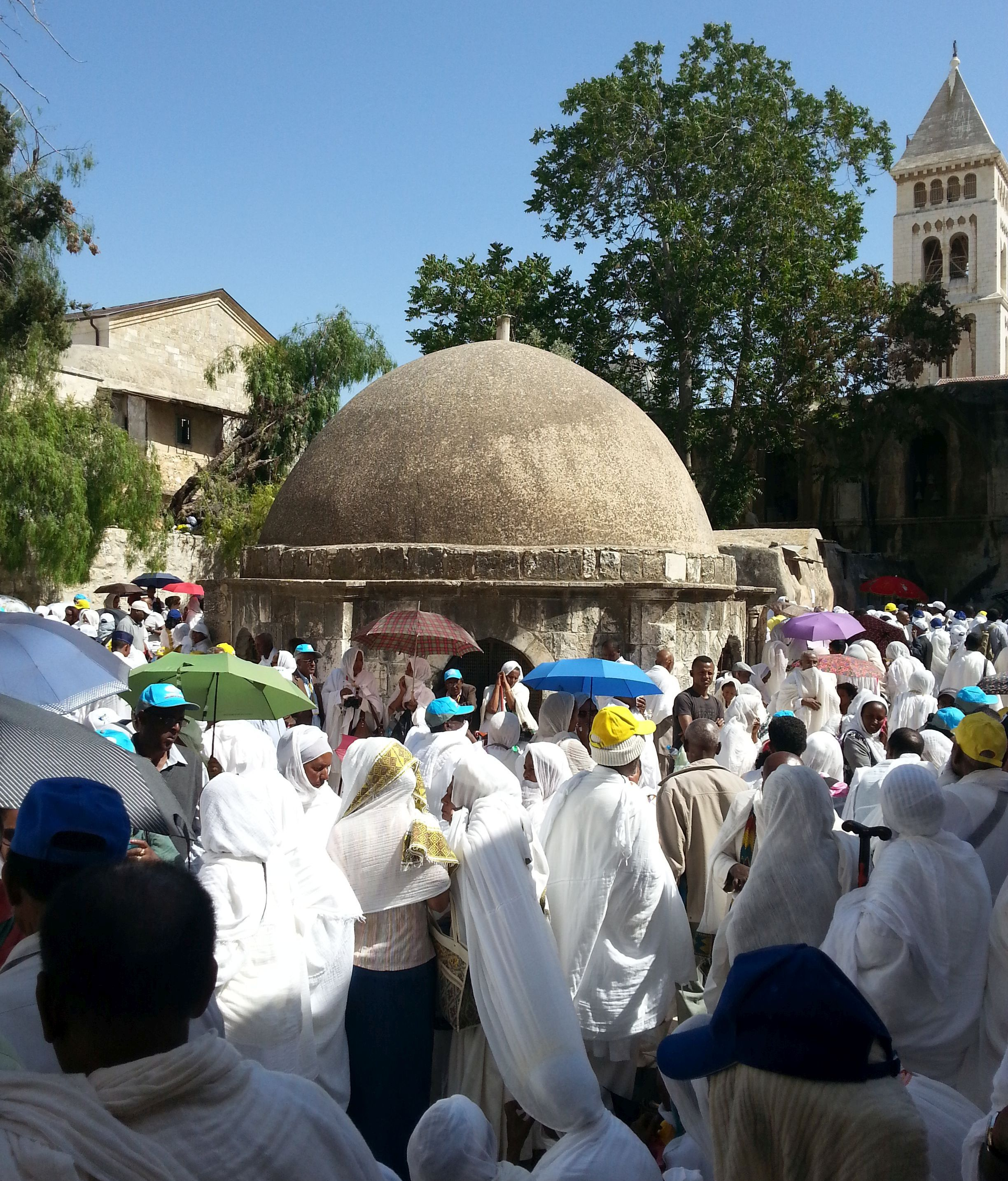

== See also ==
- Kidane Mehret Church, Jerusalem - the Ethiopian church and monastery in the New City
