= National Research Centre (Egypt) =

Egyptian research center

National Research Centre المركز القومي للبحوث
- Established: 1956
- President: Professor Dr. Hussein Darwish
- Location: Dokki, Egypt
- Website: Official website

The National Research Centre is an Egyptian research and development center for multiple disciplines including agriculture, chemistry, biology, medicine, engineering and genetics. It was established in 1956 "to foster basic and applied scientific research, particularly in industry, agriculture, public health and other sectors of national economy". The NRC is the largest institution affiliated with the ministry of Scientific Research. As of April 2024 it had a research staff of more than 4700 scientists and is headed by a president, with two vice presidents for research and technical affairs.

== Research institutes ==
The NRC is divided into 14 institutes and 109 departments, concentrated in four sectors. They are as listed below.

Institutes related to the industrial sector:

- Chemical Industries Research Institute (10 departments)
- Pharmaceutical Industries Research Institute (9 departments)
- Food Industry and Nutrition Research Institute (6 departments)
- Inorganic Chemical Industries and Mineral Resources Research Institute (6 departments)
- Textile Industries Research Institute (5 departments)
- Engineering Research Institute (5 departments)

Institutes related to basic sciences:

- Physics Research Institute (6 departments)

Institutes related to the environment and public health sectors:

- Medical and Clinical Research Institute (16 departments)
- Human Genetics & Genome Research Institute (8 departments)
- Oral & Dental Research Institute (5 departments)
- Environment and Climate Change Research Institute (3 departments)

Institutes related to the agricultural sector:

- Veterinary Research Institute (6 departments)
- Biotechnology Research Institute (8 departments)
- Agriculture and Biology Research Institute (16 departments)

== Center of Scientific Excellence for Influenza Viruses ==
The Center of Scientific Excellence for Influenza Viruses is an affiliated research center in Egypt that focuses on the threat to humans from influenza viruses of animals. The mission of the center is to conduct research on influenza viruses and develop strategies to prevent and control the spread of these viruses. Some of the specific goals of the center include:

- Developing vaccines and antiviral agents for avian influenza viruses
- Studying the prevalence and evolution of influenza viruses in Egypt
