= Basil III (Coptic archbishop of Jerusalem) =

His Eminence Basil III
- Metropolitan of the Holy and Great City of Our Lord, Jerusalem (Holy Zion), and Archbishop of the Holy and Ancient Archdiocese of Jerusalem, all Palestine and the Near East; Abbot of the Monasteries of Saint Anthony, and Saint George, Jerusalem.
- Native name: Arabic: الأنبا باسيليوس, Coptic: Ⲁⲃⲃⲁ Ⲃⲁⲥⲓⲗⲓⲟⲥ
- Church: Coptic Orthodox Church
- Archdiocese: Coptic Orthodox Archdiocese of Jerusalem
- Metropolis: Jerusalem
- Predecessor: Timothy
- Successor: Theophilus

Orders
- Consecration: 27 December 1925 by Pope Cyril V
- Rank: Metropolitan Archbishop

Personal details
- Born: Akhmim, Sohag, Egypt
- Died: 9 May 1935
- Buried: Monastery of Saint Anthony, Joppa

Basil III (Arabic: الأنبا باسيليوس, Coptic: Ⲁⲃⲃⲁ Ⲃⲁⲥⲓⲗⲓⲟⲥ) was the 17th Metropolitan of the Holy and Great City of Our Lord, Jerusalem (Holy Zion), and Archbishop of the Holy and Ancient Archdiocese of Jerusalem, all Palestine and the Near East, from 1925 until his death in 1935. During his reign, the Archdiocese of Jerusalem also possessed jurisdiction over the easternmost provinces of Egypt in Al-Sharqyia, Port Said, Ismailia, and Suez.

== Early life and monasticism ==
He was born in Akhmim, Sohag Governorate, Egypt. He joined the Monastery of Saint Anthony the Great in the Eastern Desert, and was tonsured a monk with the name, Monk James Saint Anthony (Arabic: أبونا الراهب يعقوب الأنطونى). Later he was ordained a priest, and then elevated to the rank of Hegumen, and sent to assist in the service of the See of Jerusalem.

== Episcopate ==
=== Consecration ===
Following the death of Metropolitan Timothy of Jerusalem, in 1925, Hegumen James Saint Anthony was nominated for the See. He was consecrated as Basil III, Metropolitan of Jerusalem and Archbishop of all Palestine, Philadelphia of Jordan, and all the Near East, by the hands of Pope Cyril V of Alexandria and the Bishops and Metropolitans of the Holy Synod, on December 27, 1925.

Although the Archdiocese of Jerusalem had traditionally incorporated the eastern delta, Al-Daqahlia, Al-Gharbiya, and Damietta, these provinces were cleaved off and joined into the new Diocese of Al-Mansoura, following the death of Metropolitan Timothy of Jerusalem. Thus, they were not included in Metropolitan Basil III's jurisdiction.

== Death ==
He died on May 9, 1935, after sitting on the See for 10 years. He was buried in the tomb of Metropolitan Basil II of Jerusalem, in the Monastery of Saint Anthony in Joppa.

Oriental Orthodox titles
Preceded by Timothy	Coptic Metropolitan of Jerusalem; 1925-1935	Succeeded by Theophilus
