= Habib Girgis =

Egyptian scholar (1876–1951)

Saint Habib Girgis
- Born: 1876; Cairo, Egypt
- Died: 21 August 1951 (aged 74–75); Egypt
- Venerated in: Oriental Orthodox Church
- Canonized: 20 June 2013 by Holy Synod of the Coptic Orthodox Church, Pope Tawadros II
- Feast: Mesori 15

Habib Girgis

Dean of the Catechetical School of Alexandria
- In office 1918 – 21 August 1951
- Preceded by: Youssef Bey Mankarious
- Succeeded by: Ibrahim Attia

Personal details
- Citizenship: Egypt

Habib Qozman Mankarious Girgis (Arabic: القديس حبيب جرجس, lit. 'Beloved'; 1876 – 21 August 1951) or simply Saint Habib Girgis, was an Egyptian scholar who served as dean of the modern Catechetical School of Alexandria.

He was the first student for the modern-day theological school, and was appointed to succeed Youssef Bey Mankarious in 1918, as the second dean of the renewed center of theology. In 2013, he was canonised as a saint by the Holy Synod of the Coptic Orthodox Church.

== Early work ==
Before he became the head of the theological seminary, Habib Girgis felt that preaching and adult education were not sufficient for the advancement of the Coptic Orthodox Church. Protestant and Catholic missionaries have been at work since the mid-nineteenth century, with the aim to radically influence the views of the Copts in order to abandon their long lasting faith in Oriental Orthodoxy. Thus, with many issues at hand, Girgis decided to establish Sunday schools at the beginning of the twentieth century as a means of satisfying the need for education. As a result, Coptic Orthodox Sunday schools were founded in major cities in Egypt in the year 1900 – fifteen years before there were even Egyptian public schools. The Sunday school movement flourished in Egypt after much hard work, and now, Coptic studies thrive in Egypt and abroad.

As Girgis saw it, the interest of young children were the true foundations of Sunday schools, and by 1900, Sunday school was the main pillar for the renaissance of Coptic Orthodox Christianity in the twentieth century until present, thanks in part to the hard work of Habib Girgis and other famous modern-day Sunday school teachers in the Coptic Church. Coptic churches and villages throughout Egypt at the start of the twentieth century felt that they needed to include better curriculum and more textbooks. By the year 1899, Pope Cyril V issued the need to teach children to learn and deepen their faith, as Girgis visualized the need for raising children in accordance with the teachings of Christianity and the spirit of faithful patriotism.

Girgis worked to restructure Sunday school curricula significantly, as he had striven to do what he did eventually: to improve academic standards.

== Deanship ==
He dedicated his life to the seminary and its improvement. Girgis assisted the Pope in expanding its buildings in Mahmasha. Pope Kyrillos V often visited the seminary and blessed its students. This deacon was a skillful speaker. He accompanied the Pope in his pastoral visits to Upper Egypt and Sudan. He translated many religious books from foreign languages to Arabic and published El-Karma periodical, to spread the facts of the faith in a positive way. He published many books, among them were: The Seven Sacraments of the Church, The Consoler of the Faithful, The Mystery of Piety, and many others. He taught and nurtured many generations of clergymen who flourished in the church and filled it with their sermons and religious publications.

He remained dean until his death in 1951. Later that year Pope Yusab II appointed Ibrahim Attia as Habib's successor as dean. Attia carried on the work and there were many new improvements in the years to come. This would eventually lead up to Bishop (later Pope) Shenouda's involvement as the dean of the Catechetical School of Alexandria.

== Sainthood ==
On 20 June 2013, the Holy Synod of the Coptic Orthodox Church, announced the canonization of Girgis.

== Biography ==
A biography, Habib Girgis, Coptic orthodox Educator and A light in the Darkness by Bishop Anba Suriel, was published by SVS Press in 2017 and includes newly discovered texts from the Coptic Orthodox Archives in Cairo.

== See also ==
- Institute of Coptic Studies
- List of prominent Copts
- Mikhail Girgis El Batanouny

Preceded by Youssef Bey Mankarious	Dean of the Catechetical School of Alexandria; 1918-1951	Succeeded by Father Ibrahim Attia
