= Chapel of Saint Helena, Jerusalem =

12th-century Armenian church in the Church of the Holy Sepulchre in Jerusalem

Coordinates: 31°46′42.4″N 35°13′47.1″E

Chapel of Saint Helena
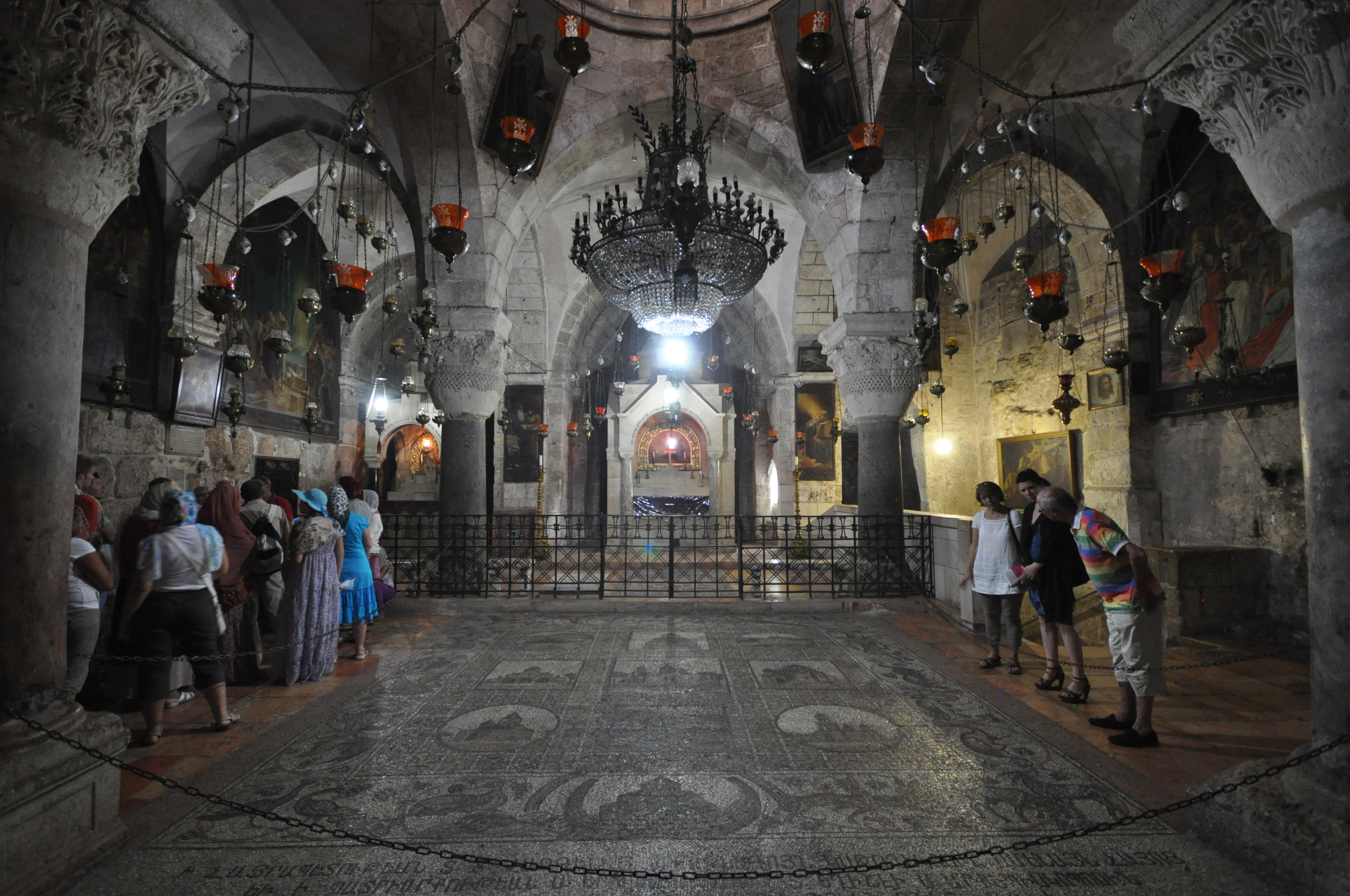

Religion
- Affiliation: Armenian Apostolic Church

Location
- Location: Church of the Holy Sepulchre, Old City of Jerusalem
- Interactive map of Chapel of Saint Helena

Architecture
- Type: Crusader
- Completed: 12th century

The Chapel of Saint Helena is a 12th-century Armenian church in the lower level of the Church of the Holy Sepulchre in Jerusalem, constructed during the Kingdom of Jerusalem. The Armenians call it the Chapel of St. Gregory the Illuminator, after the saint who brought Christianity to the Armenians.

== Description ==
In the southeast of the chapel there is a chair which was reputed to be a seat that was sat in by Helena, the mother of the Emperor Constantine when she was looking for the True Cross. There are two apses in the church, one dedicated to Saint Helena and one to the penitent thief on the cross.

== History ==
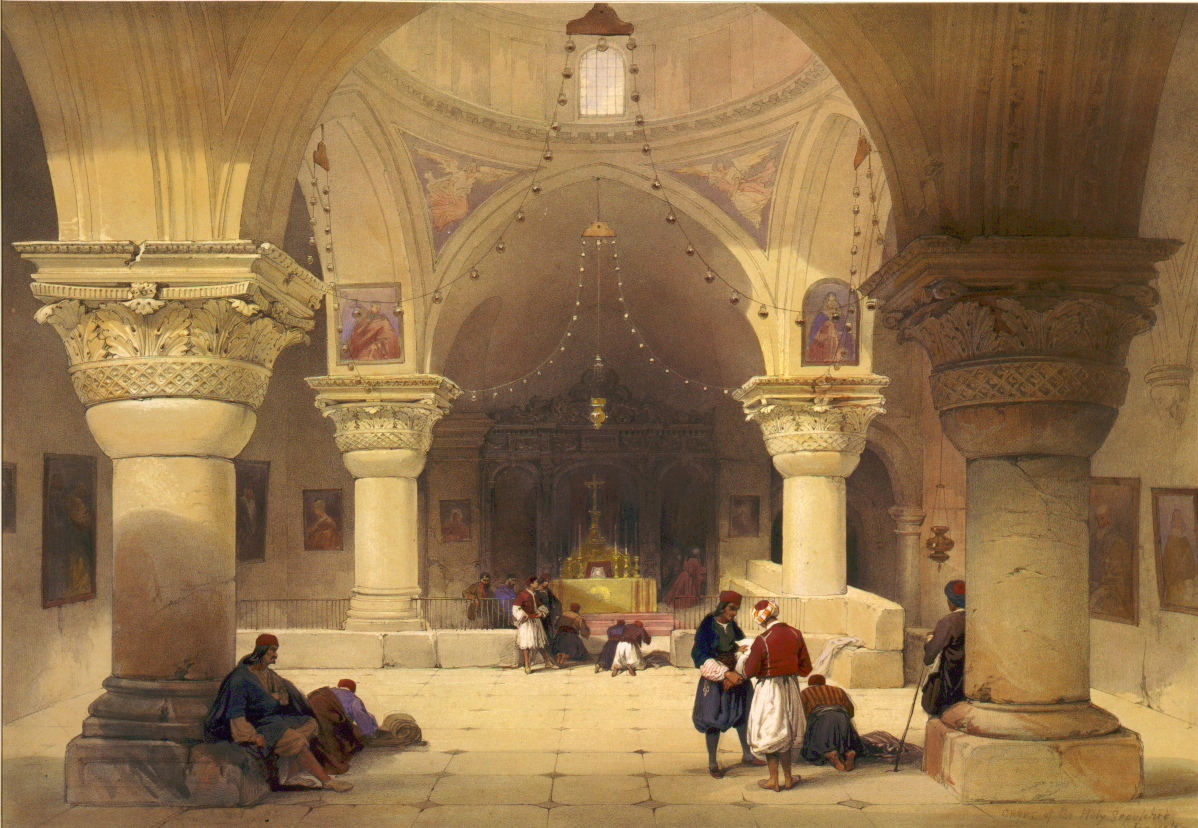
1842 lithograph by Louis Haghe, after David Roberts, from The Holy Land, Syria, Idumea, Arabia, Egypt, and Nubia

=== 2nd- and 4th-century remains ===
During 1973–1978 restoration works and excavations were made in the Church of the Holy Sepulchre. To the east of the Chapel of St. Helena, the excavators discovered a void containing a 2nd-century drawing of a Roman ship, two low walls which supported the platform of Hadrian's 2nd-century temple, and a higher 4th century wall built to support Constantine's basilica; (Note: The height difference can be easily seen—the yellowish wall on the left is the 4th century wall, the pinkish wall on the right is the 2nd century wall) the Armenian authorities have recently converted this archaeological space into the Chapel of Saint Vartan, and created an artificial walkway over the quarry on the north of the chapel, so that the new chapel could be accessed (by permission) from the Chapel of St. Helena.

=== 12th-century construction ===
The chronicler William of Tyre reports on the renovation of the Church of the Holy Sepulchre in the mid-12th century. The Crusaders investigated the eastern ruins on the site, occasionally excavating through the rubble, and while attempting to reach the cistern where the True Cross was believed to have been found, they discovered part of the original ground level of Hadrian's temple enclosure; they decided to transform this space into a chapel dedicated to Helena, widening their original excavation tunnel into a proper staircase.

=== 20th-century decoration ===
The large decorative floor mosaic is made by the 20th-century Israeli artist Hava Yofe. Part of it depicts churches in historical Armenia. Despite the images being obviously modern in their representational style, some guides tell visitors the mosaic is antique.

In 2017–2019, the chapel underwent renovations which include a new white marble altar railing and new tile flooring.

== Gallery ==
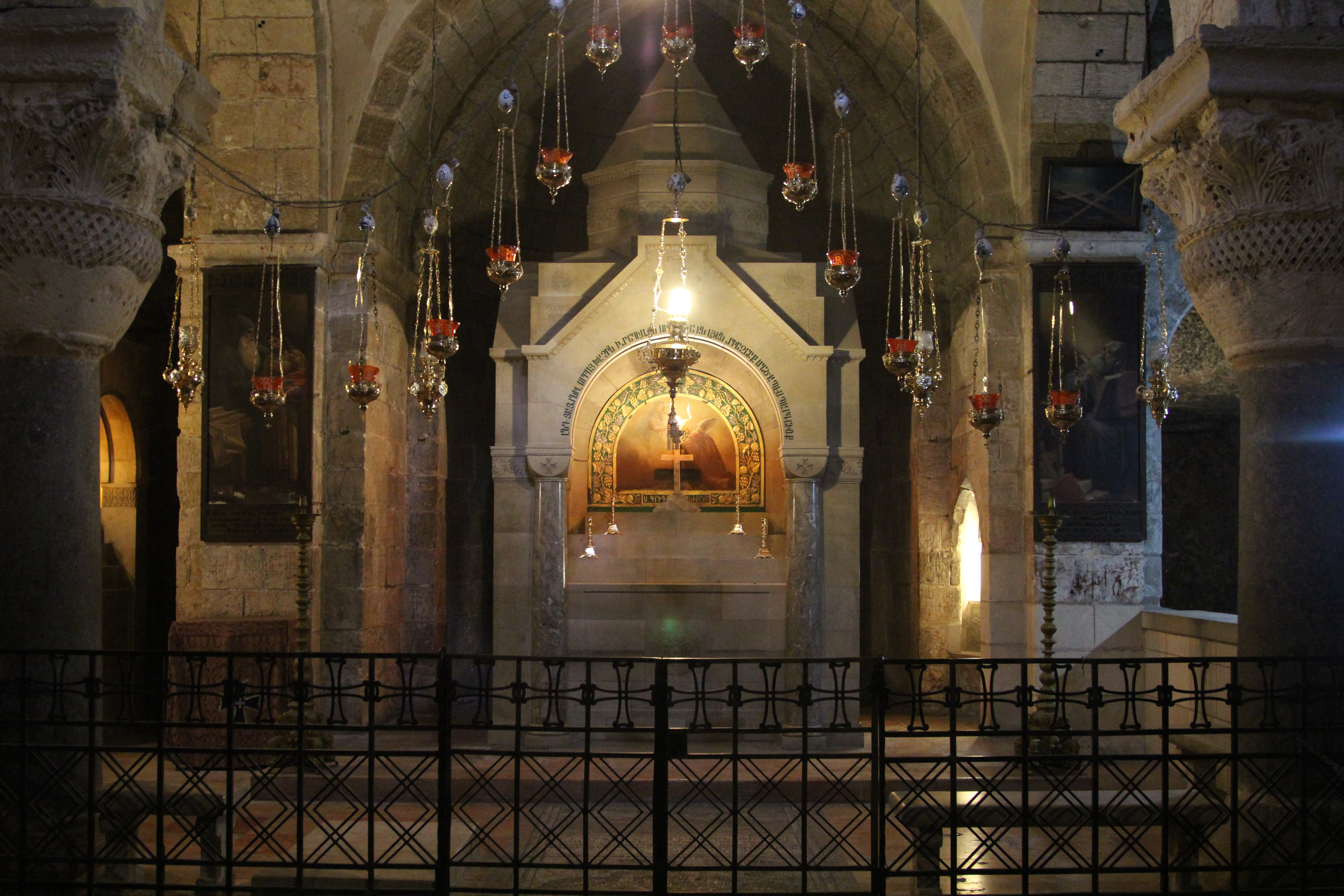
The altar

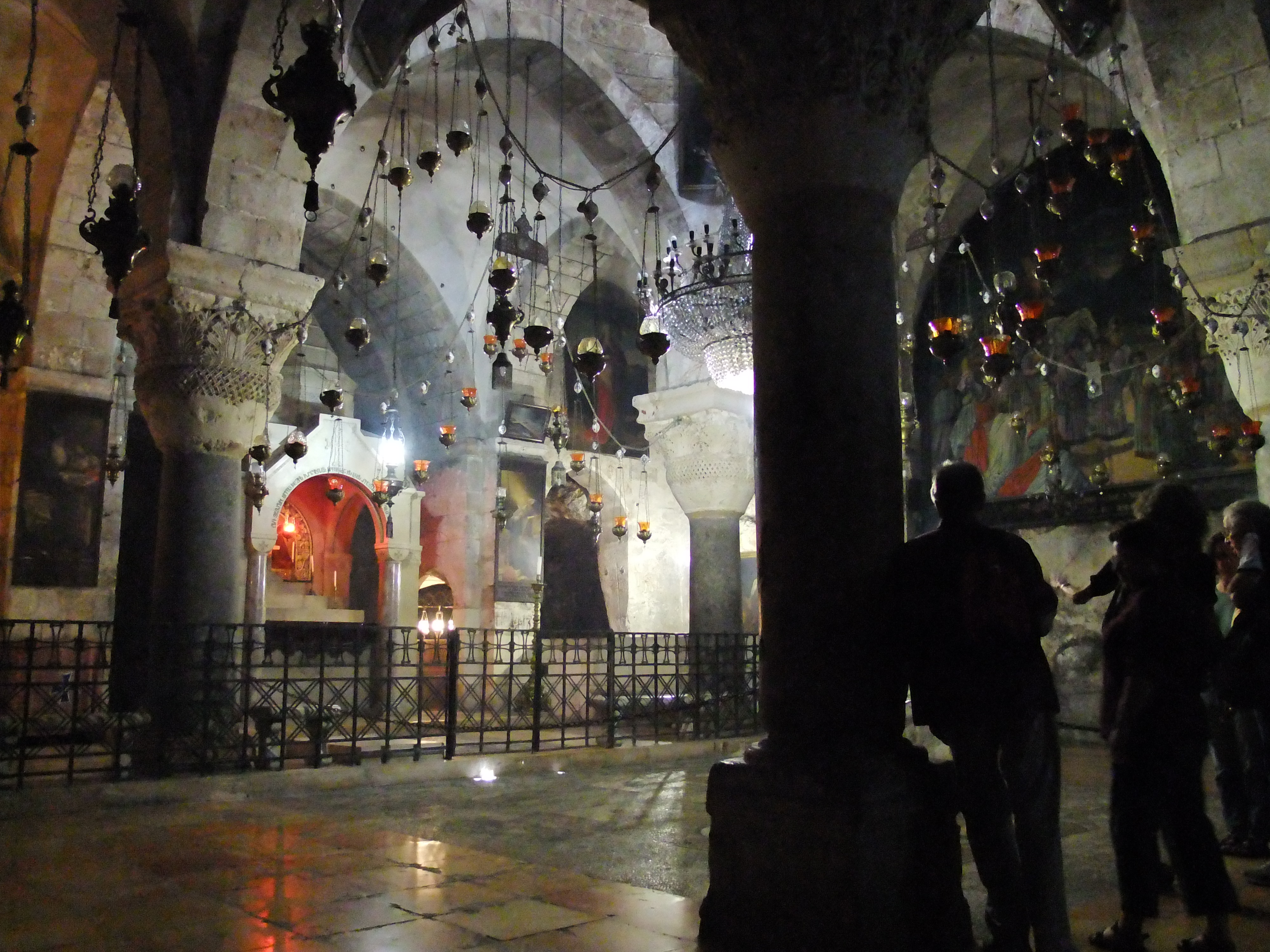
View of the chapel from the right side

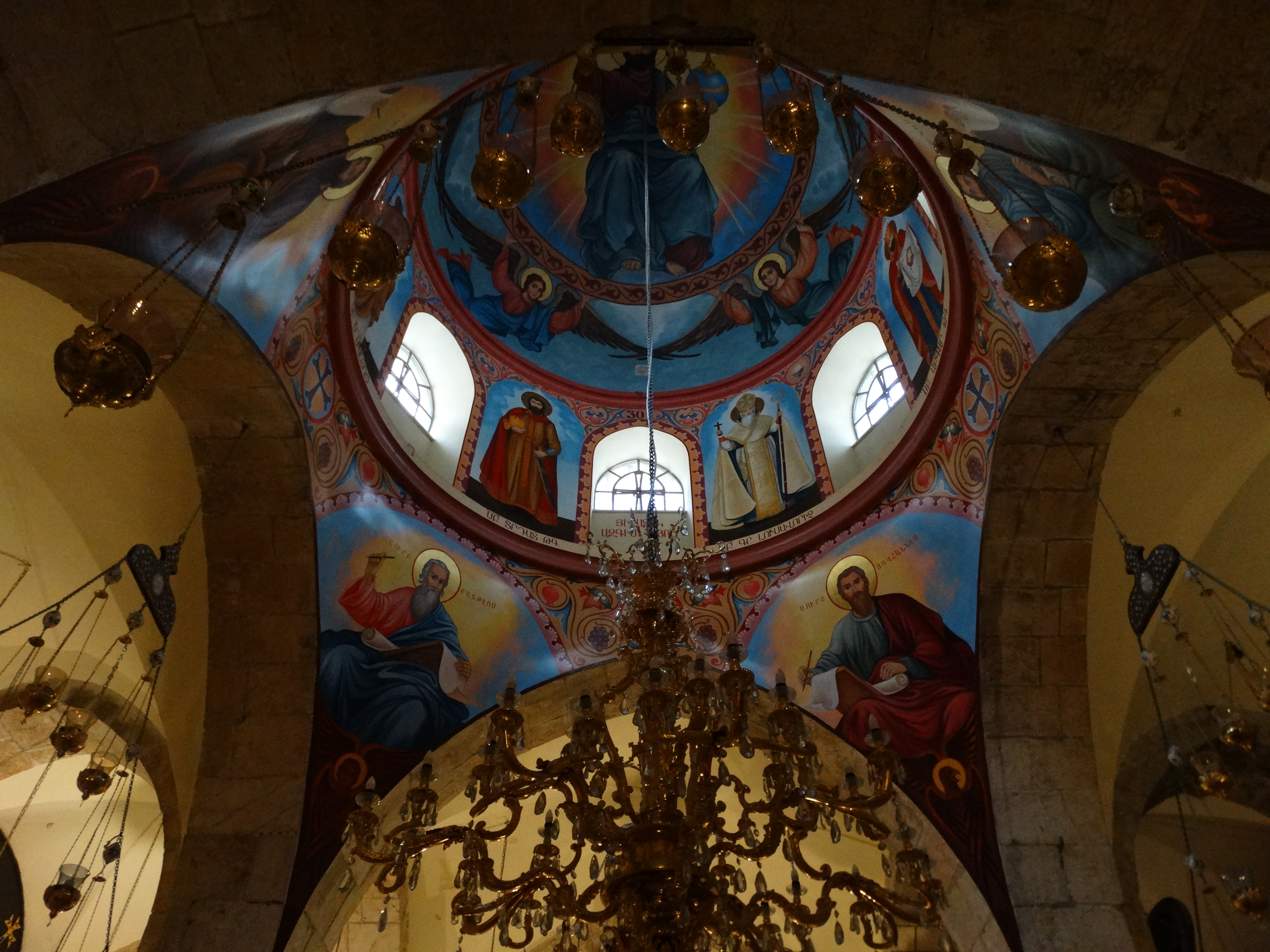
Painting under the dome

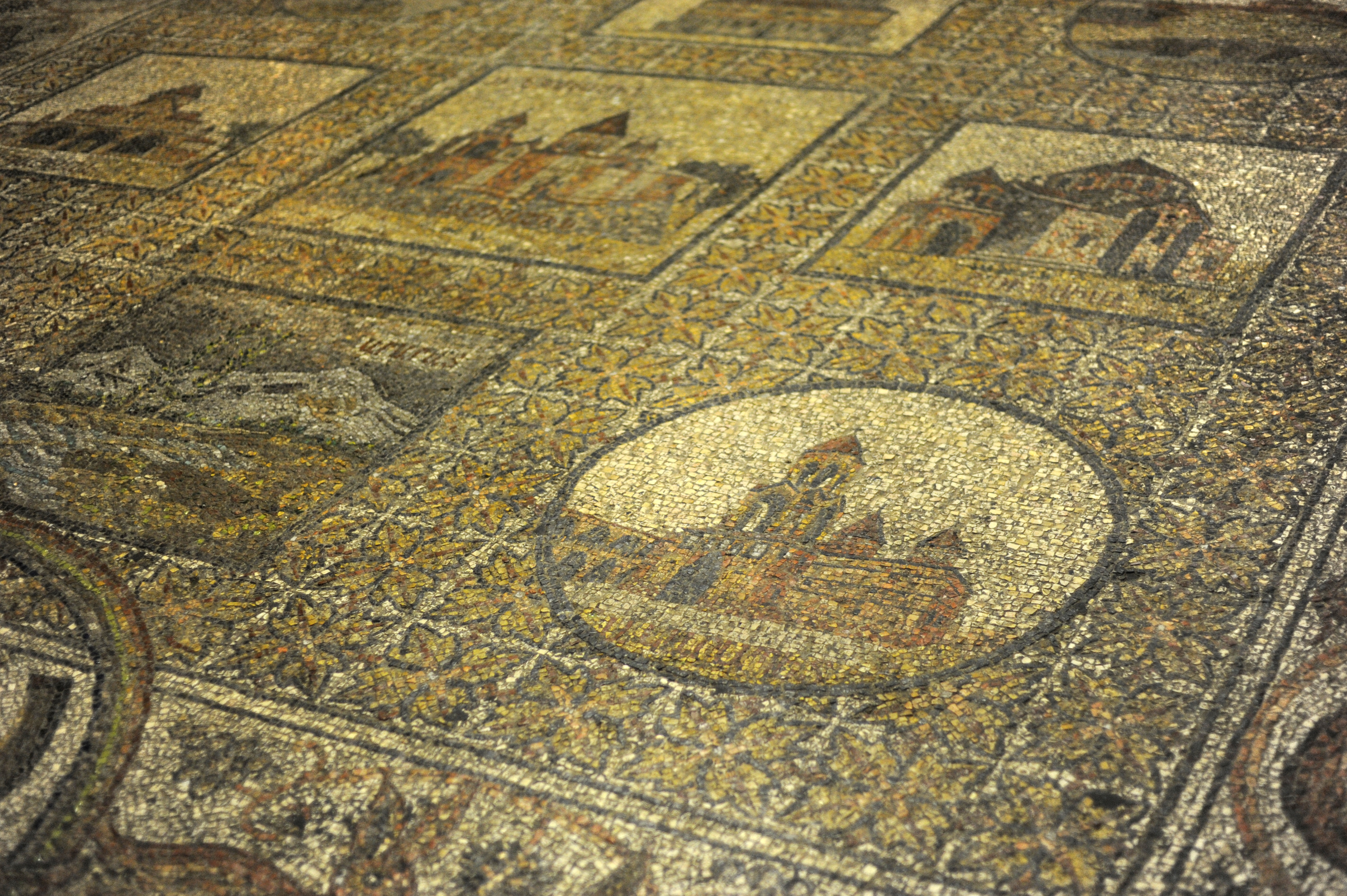
Floor mosaic

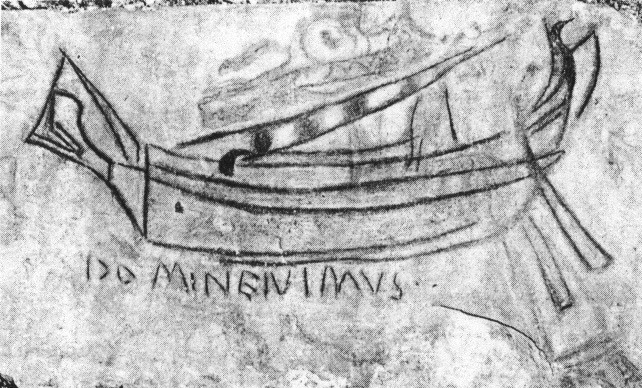
Drawing of a ship and inscription "DOMINE IVIMVS"

== See also ==
- Church of the Holy Sepulchre
- Christianity in Israel
