= Coptic Theological Seminary =

Orthodox Christian seminary in Egypt

The Coptic Theological Seminary is an institution of the Coptic Orthodox Church of Alexandria based in Cairo and with branches and affiliated seminaries throughout the world. The seminary claims historical continuity with the historic Catechetical School of Alexandria of the 2nd and 3rd centuries, and regards the 1893 establishment as a reestablishment of this school.

Directors of the Coptic Theological Seminary in Cairo include Yusuf Manqariyus from 1893 to 1918, Habib Girgis. Graduates include Pope Shenouda III of Alexandria.

== History ==
The original school in Alexandria continued until it was closed by the Byzantine emperor at the Council of Chalcedon. The centre of learning of the Coptic Church became the Monastery of Saint Macarius the Great in the Wadi El Natrun ("valley of soda-ash") 90 km north of Cairo. In 1893 the Theological College in Alexandria was re-founded by teaching children in some Cairo churches and Coptic School halls, and today has campuses in Cairo, Sydney, New Jersey and Los Angeles.
