= Nasser, Egypt =

Nasser ناصر
- City
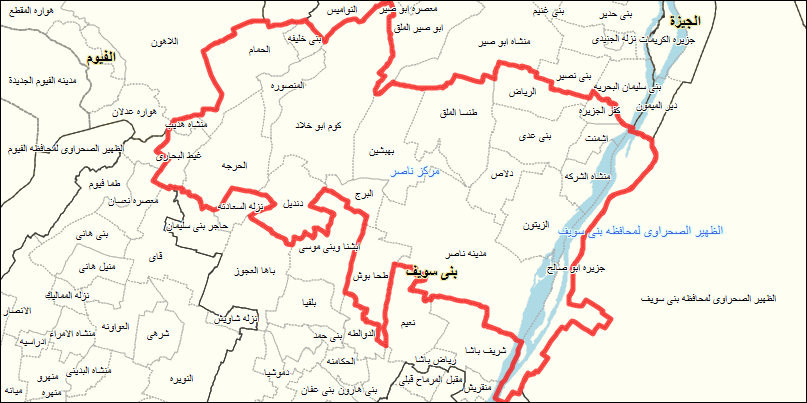
- Location in Beni Suef Governorate

- Location in Egypt
- Coordinates: 29.16985°N 31.102638°E
- Country: Egypt
- Governorate: Beni Suef

Area
  - Total: 219.6 km^{2} (84.8 sq mi)
- Elevation: 24 m (79 ft)

Population (2023)
  - Total: 427,926
  - Density: 1,949/km^{2} (5,047/sq mi)
- Demonym(s): Bushi (Male, Arabic: بوشي) Bushiyah (Female, Arabic: بوشية)
- Time zone: UTC+2 (EET)
  - Summer (DST): UTC+3 (EEST)

Nasser (Arabic: ناصر), older name is Bush (Arabic: بوش) is a city and corresponding markaz in Beni Suef Governorate, Egypt. It is named after former Egyptian President Gamal Abdel Nasser.

Several identifications for this cirt were proposed, such as Pois (Ancient Greek: Πωις) and Poгshin (Coptic: ⲡⲟⲩϣⲓⲛ) from the 13th-century martyrdom of John of Phanijoit, first proposed by Quatremère. Stefan Timm rejects that identification.

The 1885 Census of Egypt recorded Bush (as Boche) as a nahiyah under the district of Beni Suef in Beni Suef Governorate; at that time, the population of the city was 7,091 (3,554 men and 3,537 women).

== Demographics ==
Historical population
Year	Pop.	±%
1996	225,166	—
2006	273,542	+21.5%
2017	371,358	+35.8%
2023	427,926	+15.2%
Source: Citypopulation.de

As of 2023, the estimated population of Nasser markaz was 427,926, of whom 281,009 lived in rural areas and 146,917 in urban areas.
