= Monastery of Saint Macarius the Great =

Monastery in Egypt

- دير الأنبا مقار
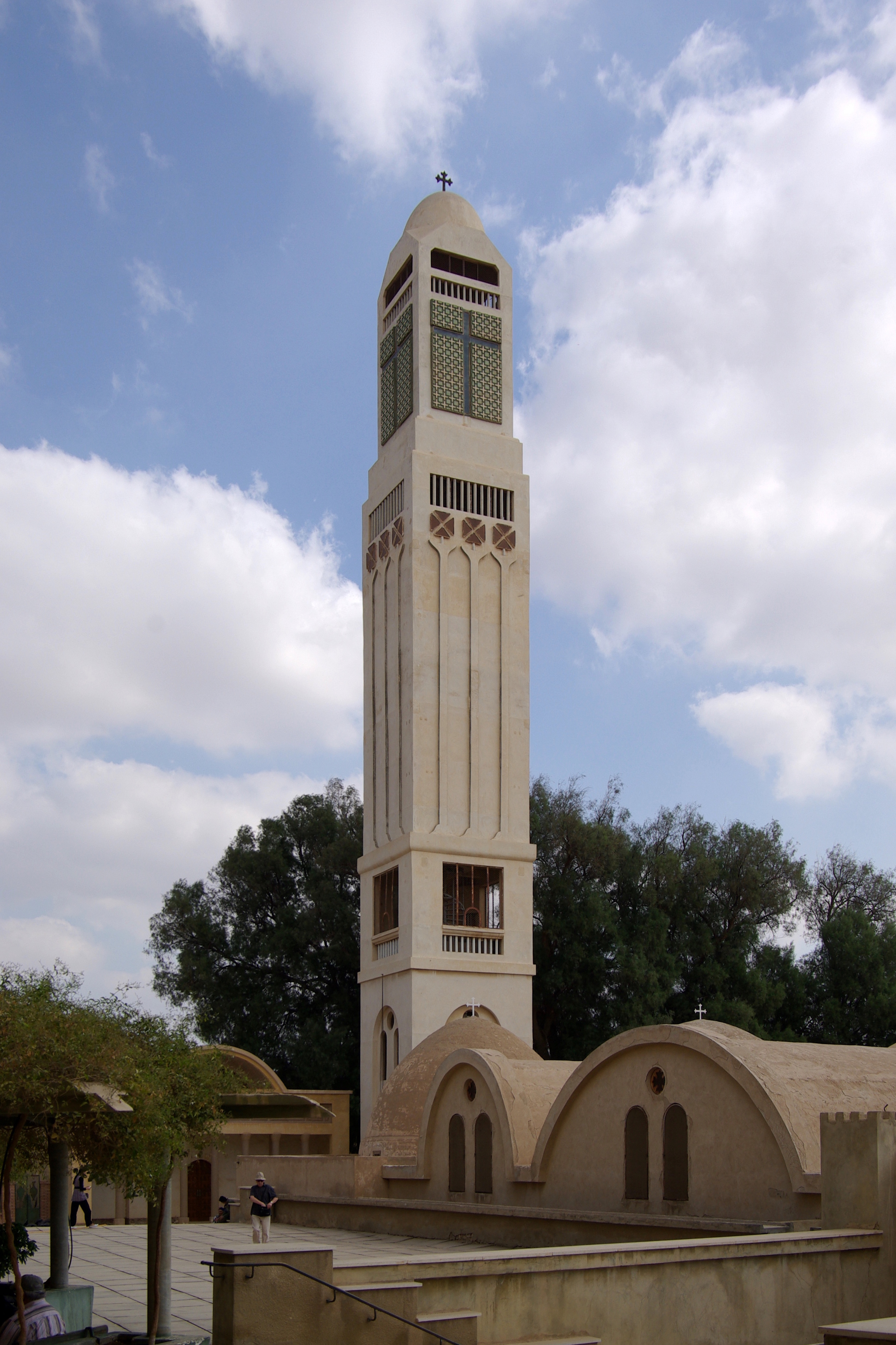
- The church tower at St Macarius' Monastery

- Location within Egypt

Monastery information
- Other name: Deir Abu Makar
- Established: 360
- Dedication: Saint Macarius the Great
- Diocese: Coptic Orthodox Church of Alexandria

People
- Founder: Saint Macarius the Great
- Important associated figures: Saint Arsenius; Saint Isidore; Saint Cyril of Alexandria; Saint John the Dwarf; Saint Macarius of Alexandria; Saint Macarius the Bishop; Saint Moses the Black; Saint Paphnutius; Saint Poemen; Saint Serapion

Site
- Location: Wadi El Natrun
- Country: Egypt
- Coordinates: 30°17′29″N 30°28′34″E
- Public access: Yes

The Monastery of Saint Macarius The Great also known as Dayr Al-ʾanbā Maqār (Arabic: دير الأنبا مقار) is a Coptic Orthodox monastery located in Wadi El Natrun, Beheira Governorate, about 92 km (57 mi) north-west of Cairo, and off the highway between Cairo and Alexandria.

The monastery is attributed to Saint Macarius the Great, a disciple of Saint Anthony the Great, the founder of Christian monasticism. Macarius retreated to the Wadi El-Natrun desert and is believed to have established his hermitage there in the last third of the 4th century AD. The monastery was once overseen by Pope Shenouda III, following the resignation of Bishop Michael of Assiut, who had served as its abbot for 65 years. After Pope Shenouda’s death in March 2012, the monks requested the reinstatement of Bishop Michael as abbot. He returned to lead the monastery in April 2012 but resigned permanently shortly after. On March 10, 2013, Anba Epiphanius was appointed abbot, a position he held until his assassination on July 29, 2018.

The monastery spans an area of approximately 11.34 square kilometers, including its farmlands and associated buildings. It houses seven churches—three within the main complex and four atop the fortress. Additionally, the monastery includes monk cells (known as kelia), a communal dining hall attached to a kitchen, a small museum, a hospital, a power station, a printing press, and a library containing rare manuscripts. There are also accommodations for non-monk staff working within the monastery.

The monastery is renowned for the purported presence of the relics of John the Baptist and the prophet Elisha within the main Church of Saint Macarius. These relics were reportedly discovered during unofficial restoration and expansion works in 1976, overseen by Father Matta El-Meskeen. The find was officially announced in November 1978, sparking controversy, particularly among Muslims, who believe that prophets' bodies do not decay. Moreover, existing Islamic shrines already attributed to these prophets further complicated the matter. Additional controversy arose following a separate discovery in Bulgaria in 2010, where relics claimed to belong to John the Baptist were unearthed beneath an ancient church.

The monastery also contains relics of other saints and patriarchs, adding to its religious and historical importance.

== Etymology ==
The monastery is attributed to Saint Macarius the Great, also known as Abu Makar or Macarius. He is one of three saints who share this name, the others being Macarius of Alexandria, founder of the Kellia settlement, and Macarius, Bishop of Edkau. Saint Macarius the Great is the founder of this monastery and the pioneer of monasticism in the Wadi El-Natrun region.

Born around the year 300 AD (approximately 1,724 years ago), Macarius the Great was the first to establish monastic communities in the Scetis Desert, now known as Wadi El-Natrun. He died around 397 AD (approximately 1,627 years ago).

The name Macarius has ancient Egyptian roots, derived from the Demotic term Makhro, meaning "true of voice," signifying honesty and integrity. In Coptic, the name is pronounced Makari, later refined to Makareh with the addition of a final H to reflect a more developed articulation. This evolved into Maqarah or Makar in Arabic, which remains the commonly used form, faithfully reflecting its Coptic origin.

In Greek, the name was adapted with the addition of Waw (letter), becoming Makarios.

== History ==
=== Ancient history ===
The exact date of the foundation of the Monastery of Saint Macarius, or even the beginning of the monastic settlement in the area, cannot be determined with precision. However, its emergence as an early monastic community in the Wadi El-Natrun desert can be traced to the latter third of the 4th century AD, specifically following the death of Saints Maximus and Domitius in 384 AD (approximately 1,640 years ago) by Saint Macarius of Egypt, who was the spiritual father to more than 4,000 monks of different nationalities. The monastery has been continuously inhabited by monks since its 4th-century founding. Several Christian saints and fathers of the early Church were monks at the Monastery of Saint Macarius, including Saint Macarius of Alexandria, Saint John the Dwarf, Saint Paphnutius the Ascetic, Saint Isidore, Saint Arsenius, Saint Moses the Black, Saint Poemen, Saint Serapion among others.

The monastic community began with a single cell belonging to Saint Macarius the Great himself. This cell, initially a cave roofed with Djerid and papyrus, was located west of the current monastery near the site of the present Monastery of Baramus. Over time, disciples and followers gathered around him, constructing their own cells at some distance from Macarius's original cell.

As the number of aspiring monks increased, Macarius left the growing community to settle in what is now the site of the Monastery of Saint Macarius, leading to the establishment of the Monastery of Baramus as well.

With the influx of new disciples, a church was built for communal prayers. Adjacent to the church were essential facilities, including a water well, a bakery, and a kitchen for cooking. Over time, the monastery expanded to include storage rooms, a guesthouse, and a refectory for the monks to share the Agape Meal or "Meal of Love."

In the 5th century AD, the monastic community of Scetis (Wadi El-Natrun) faced repeated raids by Berber tribes. The first attack occurred in 407 AD

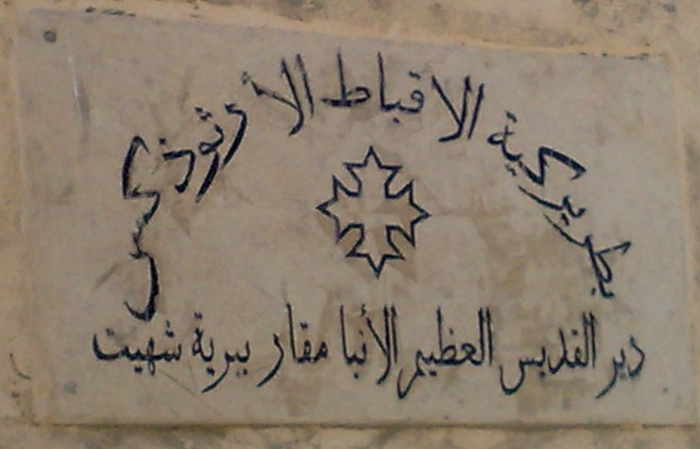
Monastery sign.

(approximately 1,617 years ago), followed by a second raid in 434 AD (approximately 1,590 years ago). These invasions brought widespread looting, destruction, and loss of life, prompting the monastic communities to construct defensive towers. These towers served as fortifications where monks could seek refuge during attacks. They were equipped with essential supplies, such as food stores, a water well, and a small church for prayer.

The Monastery of Saint Macarius built its first defensive structure, known as the "Bayamon Fortress," shortly before the third Berber raid in 444 AD. The fortress was located near the monastery and was designed to protect both the monks and the monastery's valuable possessions, including manuscripts and other artifacts.

During this raid, 49 elders sought refuge in the Bayamon Fortress but were killed by the Berbers near its walls. Their remains were initially buried in a nearby cave but were later transferred in the 7th century to a church within the monastery dedicated to their memory. This event underscored the need

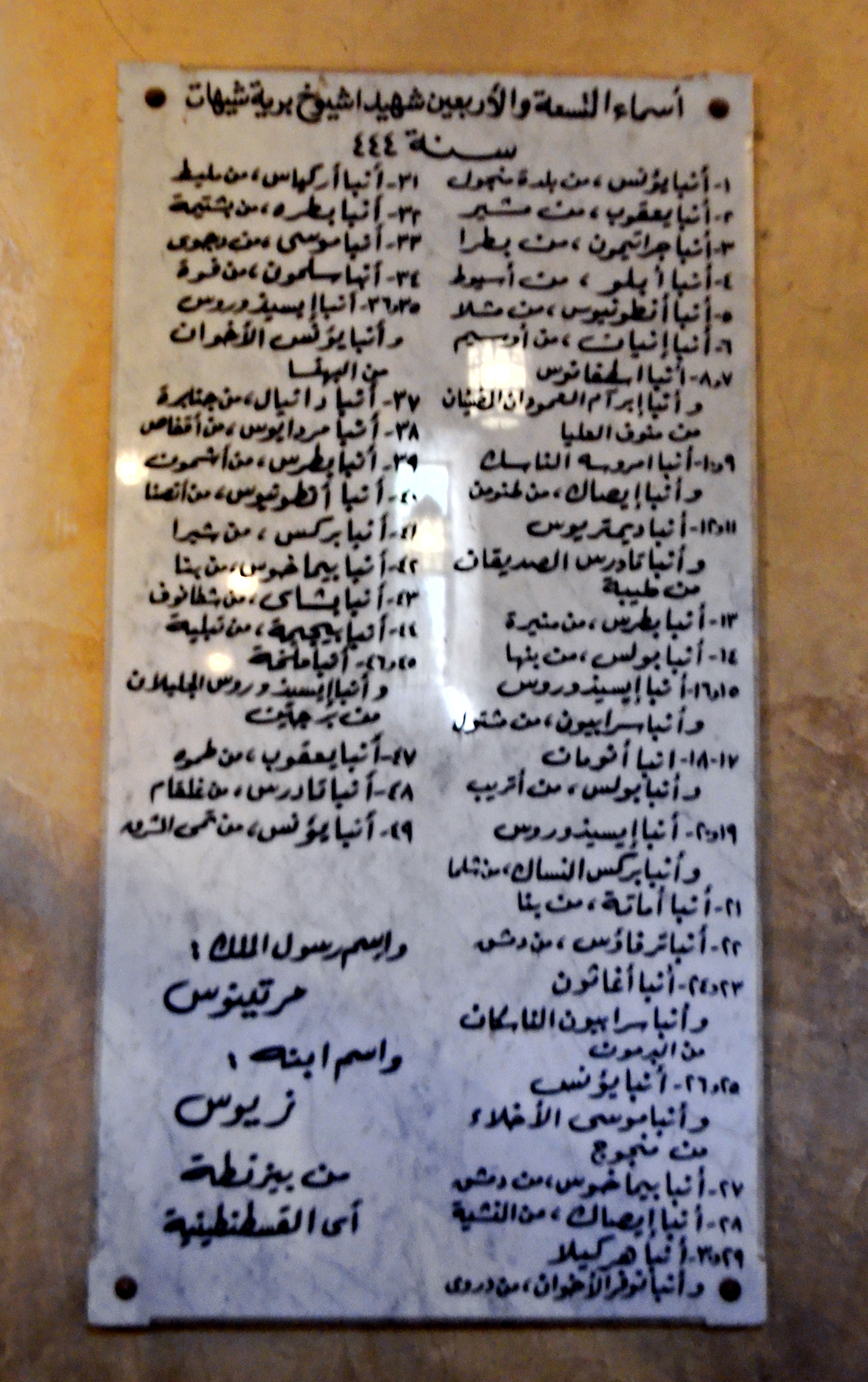
A marble plaque with the names of the forty-nine sheikhs killed by the Berbers in 444 (1580 years ago).

for fortified structures, shaping the development of monastic architecture in the region.

At the end of the 5th century AD, Emperor Zeno of the Eastern Roman Empire provided financial support for the monasteries of Wadi El-Natrun. This was in honor of his daughter Hilaria, who had secretly fled the imperial palace and later became a nun in the desert region. Zeno’s patronage facilitated renovations and expansions in the monasteries, including the construction of fortified towers, churches, and various monastic buildings with marble columns. He also ordered the reconstruction of the Church of Saint Macarius.

In the early 6th century, Pope Theodosius I consecrated a new church in the monastery dedicated to the Mary, mother of Jesus(Theotokos), marking the first such dedication in Wadi El-Natrun according to Coptic Orthodox tradition. This church, known as the Southern Church, later served as the burial site for the remains of the 49 Elders of Scetis, who had been martyred during earlier Berber raids.

However, by the late 6th century, the monastery suffered extensive damage during the fourth Berber raid around 570 AD (approximately 1,454 years ago). Many monastic settlements were destroyed, leading to a decline in the number of monks. The monastery remained in ruins until it was restored after the Islamic conquest of Egypt in 641 AD.

In 631 AD (approximately 1,393 years ago), during a visit by Pope Benjamin I, a new church was commissioned within the monastery, dedicated to the 49 Elders of Scetis. Later, around 655 AD (approximately 1,369 years ago), Pope Benjamin I consecrated a rebuilt Church of Saint Macarius, known as the "Benjamin Altar." This event was witnessed by his disciple Anba Agathon, who later succeeded him as Patriarch.

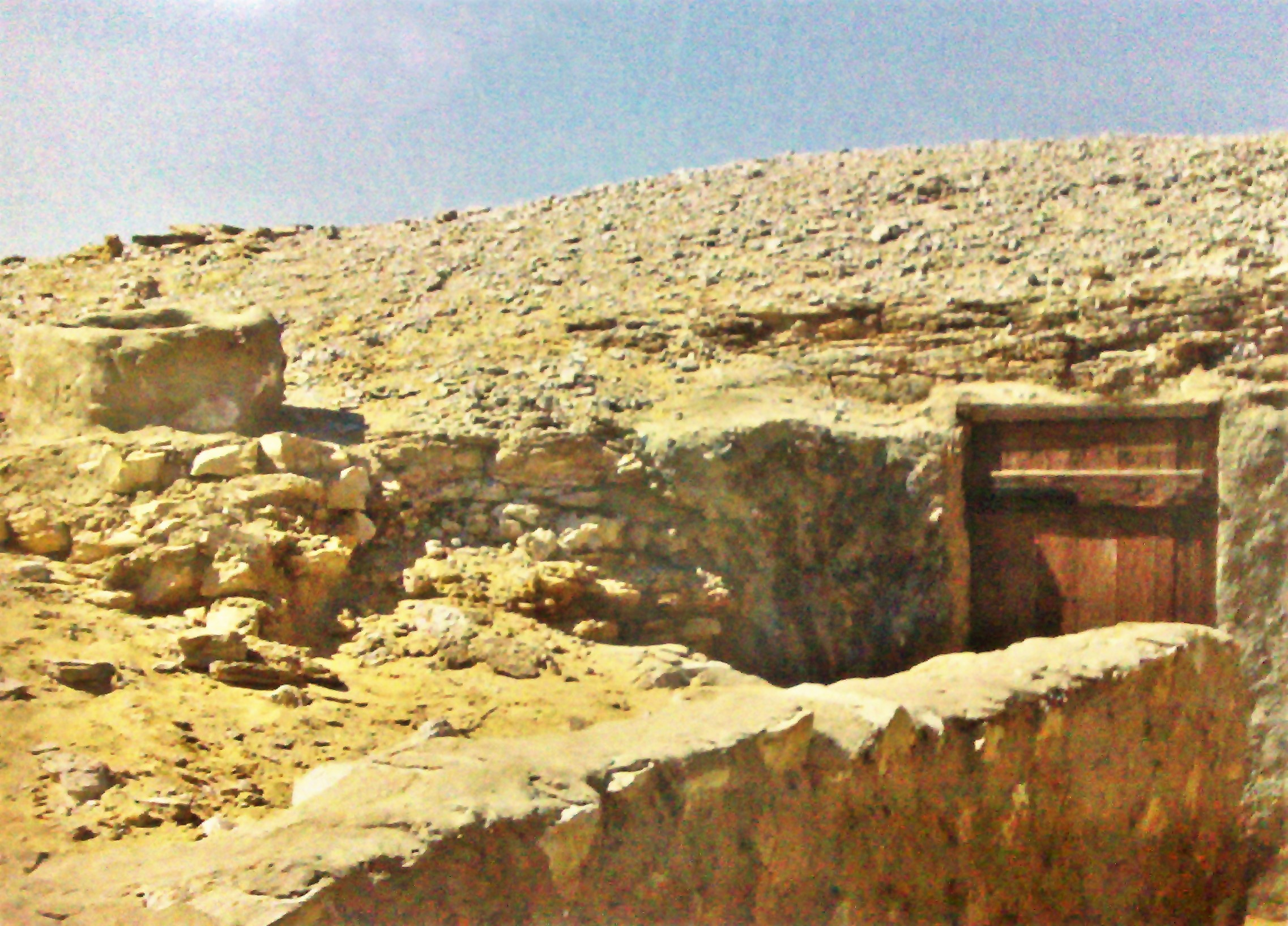
The cave of Anba Makar the Great, where he is believed to have worshipped.

The Church of Saint Macarius was designed with a sanctuary, a domed choir, a nave, and side aisles.

In 793 AD (approximately 1,231 years ago), during the patriarchate of Pope John IV, the relics of Saint Macarius the Great were transferred to the monastery in a wooden casket. The relics of Saint Macarius of Alexandria were already housed there, and the remains of Saint Macarius of Edku were later added during the time of Pope Michael III.

By the early 9th century, each monastic complex was enclosed by medium-height walls to protect against petty thieves. These walls, however, offered little defense against major attacks. During the fifth Berber raid in 817 AD (approximately 1,207 years ago), the monastery suffered damage once again, highlighting the limitations of these modest fortifications.

During the tenure of Pope Jacob I, construction began on a church dedicated to Saint Shenouda, located south of the Benjamin Altar within the Church of Saint Macarius. Additionally, the Church of Saint Macarius was rebuilt after 825 AD (approximately 1,199 years ago) due to earlier damage. In 847 AD (1,177 years ago), during the patriarchate of Pope Joseph I, another church was constructed in the monastery, named the Church of the Apostles, situated north of the main church.

By the mid-9th century, the monastery housed three churches: the Great Church of Saint Macarius (the Benjamin Altar), the Church of Saint Shenouda to its south, and the Church of the Apostles to its north. Records from 853 AD (1,171 years ago) also mention a fourth church, dedicated to Saint Spheros, which was described as remote and isolated from the other churches.

In 866 AD (1,158 years ago), during the time of Pope Shenouda I, Bedouin tribes raided the monasteries and attacked pilgrims gathered at the Monastery of Saint Macarius. This led to destruction, prompting the Pope to initiate the construction of a fortified stone wall around the main church, the other churches, monastic cells, the tower, the well, and storage facilities. The fort itself was repaired, and new cells were built within the enclosure in 870 AD (1,154 years ago).

Over time, the original front wall of the monastery fell into disrepair and collapsed in the mid-18th century. It was subsequently rebuilt, but the new wall encompassed an area less than half the size of the original. Beyond the walls, the surrounding area was dotted with monastic settlements, or manshoubiyat, that thrived until the 14th century. These settlements were closely associated with the central Church of Saint Macarius and contributed to the monastery’s vitality during this period.

In 884 AD, during the patriarchate of Pope Michael III, Khumarawayh ibn Ahmad ibn Tulun visited the Monastery of Saint Macarius. This marked the first visit by a Muslim ruler to the monasteries of Wadi El-Natrun since the Islamic conquest of Egypt.

In 1005 AD (approximately 1,019 years ago), a new church was constructed south of the Benjamin Altar, named the Southern Church of Saint

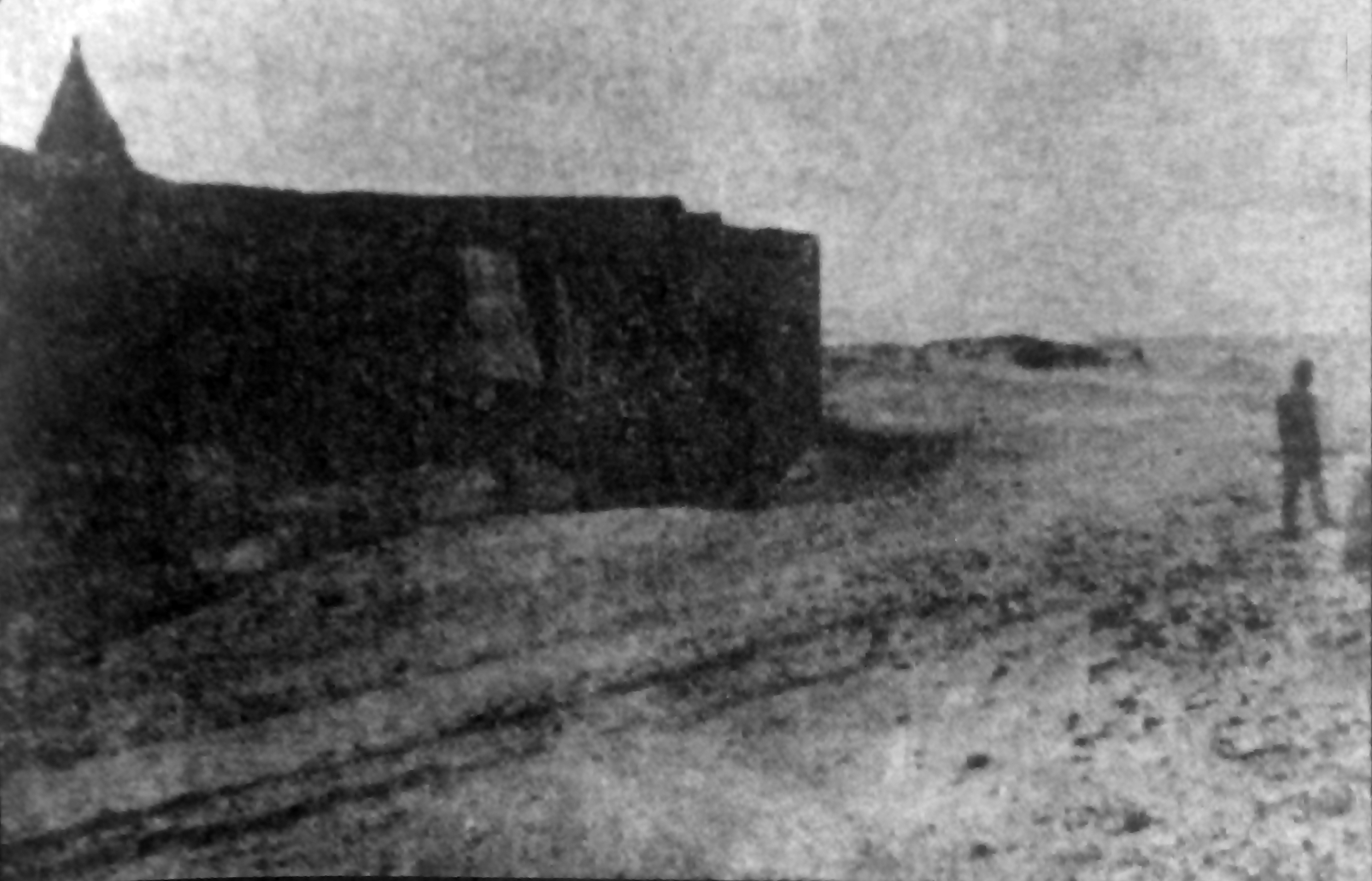
An old photo of the monastery's exterior from 1935.

Macarius. This was necessitated by the previous church being renamed in honor of Saint Benjamin. In 1069 AD (955 years ago), the Berber Luwata tribe raided the monastery and other Wadi El-Natrun monasteries despite their fortified walls. However, unlike previous raids, the Berbers did not inflict damage on the structures.

In 1172 AD (852 years ago), Pope Mark III undertook the restoration of the monastery's outer walls.

In 1264 AD (760 years ago), Sultan Al-Zahir Baybars visited the monastery. Similarly, Pope Benjamin II visited in 1330 AD (694 years ago) en route to the Monastery of Saint Bishoy to oversee repairs following termite damage to its wooden structures.

Around 1413 AD (611 years ago), the relics of Saint John the Short were transferred to the Monastery of Saint Macarius after his original monastery's roof collapsed due to termite damage.

The monastic life in Wadi El-Natrun gradually declined in the following centuries. Restoration efforts for the Monastery of Saint Macarius began in 1929 AD (95 years ago), marking the start of a revival in the region.

=== Modern history ===
In 1969, the monastery entered an era of restoration, both spiritually and architecturally, with the arrival of twelve monks under the spiritual leadership of Father Matta El Meskeen. These monks had spent the previous ten years living together entirely isolated from the world, in the desert caves of Wadi El Rayyan, about 50 km (31 mi) south of Fayoum.

Pope Cyril VI ordered this group of monks to leave Wadi El Rayyan and go to the Monastery of Saint Macarius the Great to restore it. At that time only six aged monks were living in the monastery, and its historic buildings were on the verge of collapsing. The new monks were received by the abbot of the monastery, Bishop Michael, Metropolitan of Assiut.

Under Pope Shenouda III, who was himself busily engaged in restoring the Monastery of Saint Pishoy and the Paromeos Monastery, and after fourteen years of constant activity both in reconstruction and spiritual renewal, the monastic community in the Monastery of Saint Macarius numbers about one hundred monks.

The Monastery of Saint Macarius maintains spiritual, academic and fraternal links with several monasteries abroad, including the monastery of Chevetogne in Belgium, Solesmes Abbey and the Monastery of the Transfiguration in France, Bose Monastic Community in Italy, Deir El Harf in Lebanon, and the Convent of the Incarnation in England.

The Monastery of Saint Macarius the Great contains the relics of many saints, such as the Forty-Nine Martyrs of Scetis.

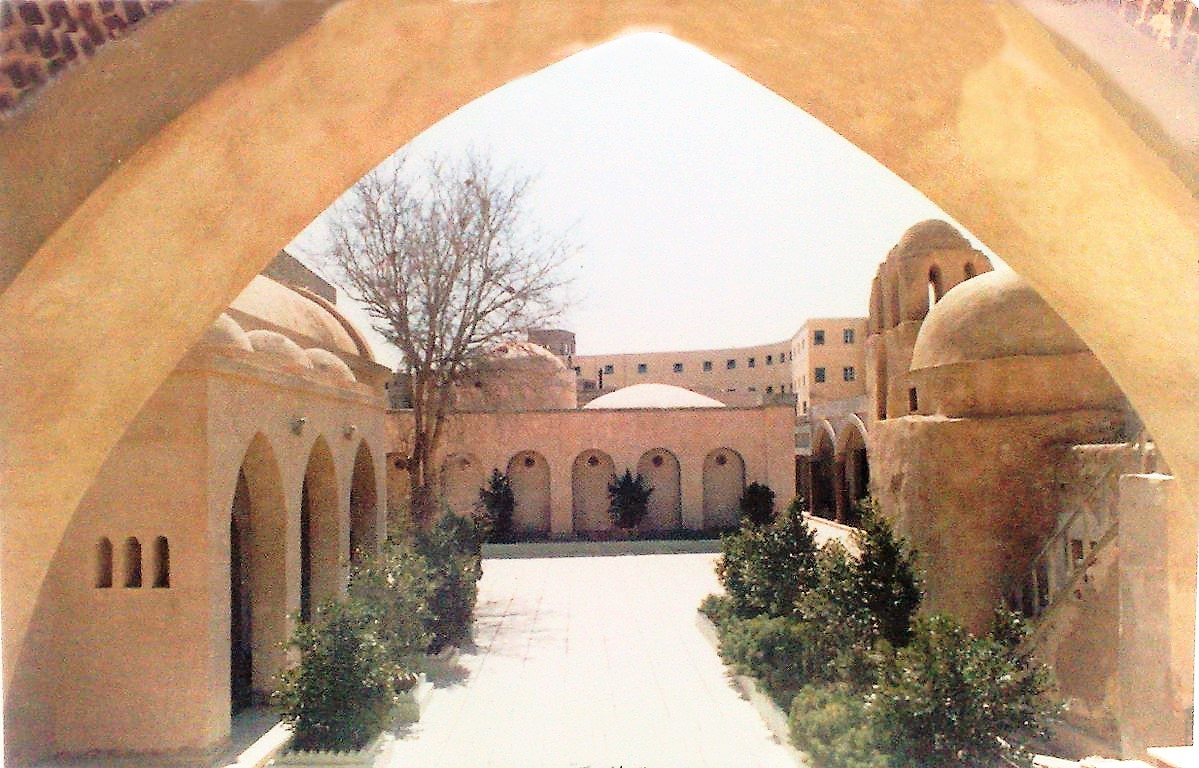
The gate leading to the monastery's three churches: Anba Maqar Church, Abascheron Church, and the Church of the Elders.

== General Description and Non-Religious Facilities ==
The Monastery of Saint Macarius covers an area of approximately 2,700 feddans, equivalent to about 11,340,000 square meters. The main buildings of the monastery occupy less than two feddans. Its overall shape is rectangular, almost square, with the total area—including modern additions and renovations—reaching around eight feddans. Most of these additions consist of newly reclaimed lands.

The monastery is divided internally into two nearly equal sections by a series of buildings oriented generally from east to west.

The northern section has a quadrilateral layout, featuring an open courtyard with a well at its center, though the well water is no longer potable. A brick water wheel, built in 1911, is also located here. Along the eastern and northern sides of the courtyard are rows of monk cells (known as kelia) and the Church of Saint Macarius. To the east, a guesthouse was constructed, along with a modern row of monk cells.

To the west of the courtyard stands the Church of the Forty-Nine Martyrs of Scetis. Adjacent to it is a room known as the Myron cell, historically used for preparing holy chrism oil.

The southern section contains the fortress, a prominent feature of the monastery. Beneath its southern wall lies the monks' burial site, known as the taphos. The Church of Saint Abaskhiron is situated on the northern side of this section, while the western side houses the refectory, where communal meals are taken.

Under the leadership of Pope Shenouda III, the 117th Coptic Orthodox Patriarch, developments were made at the Monastery of Saint Macarius. Sixteen new groups of monk cells were constructed, each group containing six cells. A new refectory was built, equipped with a modern kitchen, and a library was established, which is now the largest monastic library in the region, dedicated to preserving surviving manuscripts and rare books.

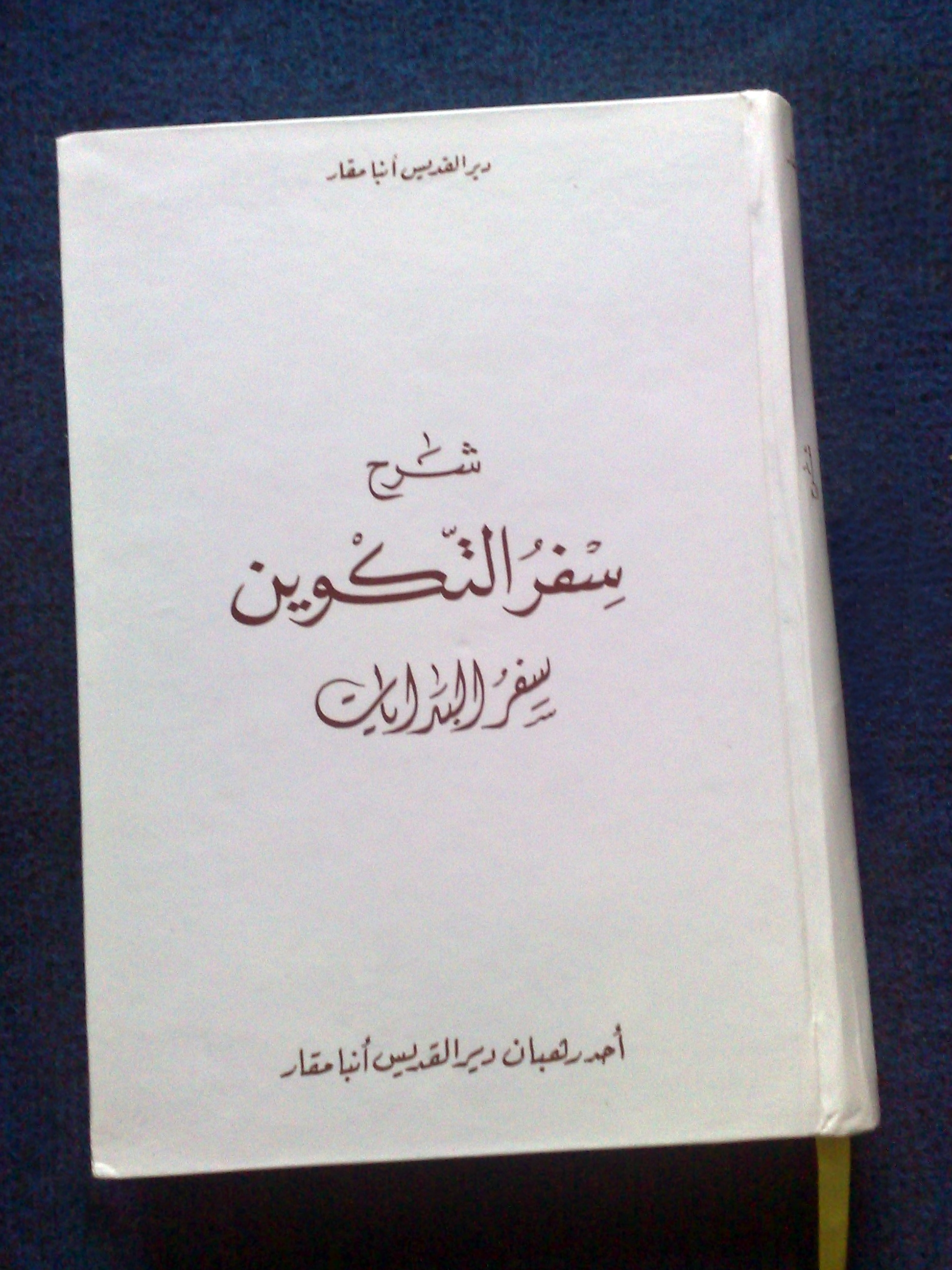
One of the monastery's publications.

Attached to the northern side of the library is a museum storage room showcasing artifacts discovered during the monastery’s restoration. These include rare marble pieces such as columns, capitals, bases, and altar slabs, which are considered among the rarest in the world. Additionally, the museum displays baptismal basins, colored pottery, and ceramic vessels.

The monastery now includes a small hospital with an attached pharmacy on its southern side. It also operates a printing press that publishes works by the monks and issues a monthly magazine, Markos. A dedicated power station supplies electricity to the monastery and its facilities, including the residences of workers at the monastery’s farm.

The monastery's farm was developed on 1,000 feddans of Land restoration, gifted by former President Anwar Sadat. The farm produces a variety of crops, including sugar beets, figs, melons, olives, and dates. It also supports livestock production, including cattle and poultry farming.

The monastery owns additional land on Egypt’s north western coast along the Alexandria-Marsa Matruh road, further extending its agricultural and developmental projects.

=== Alqalali ===
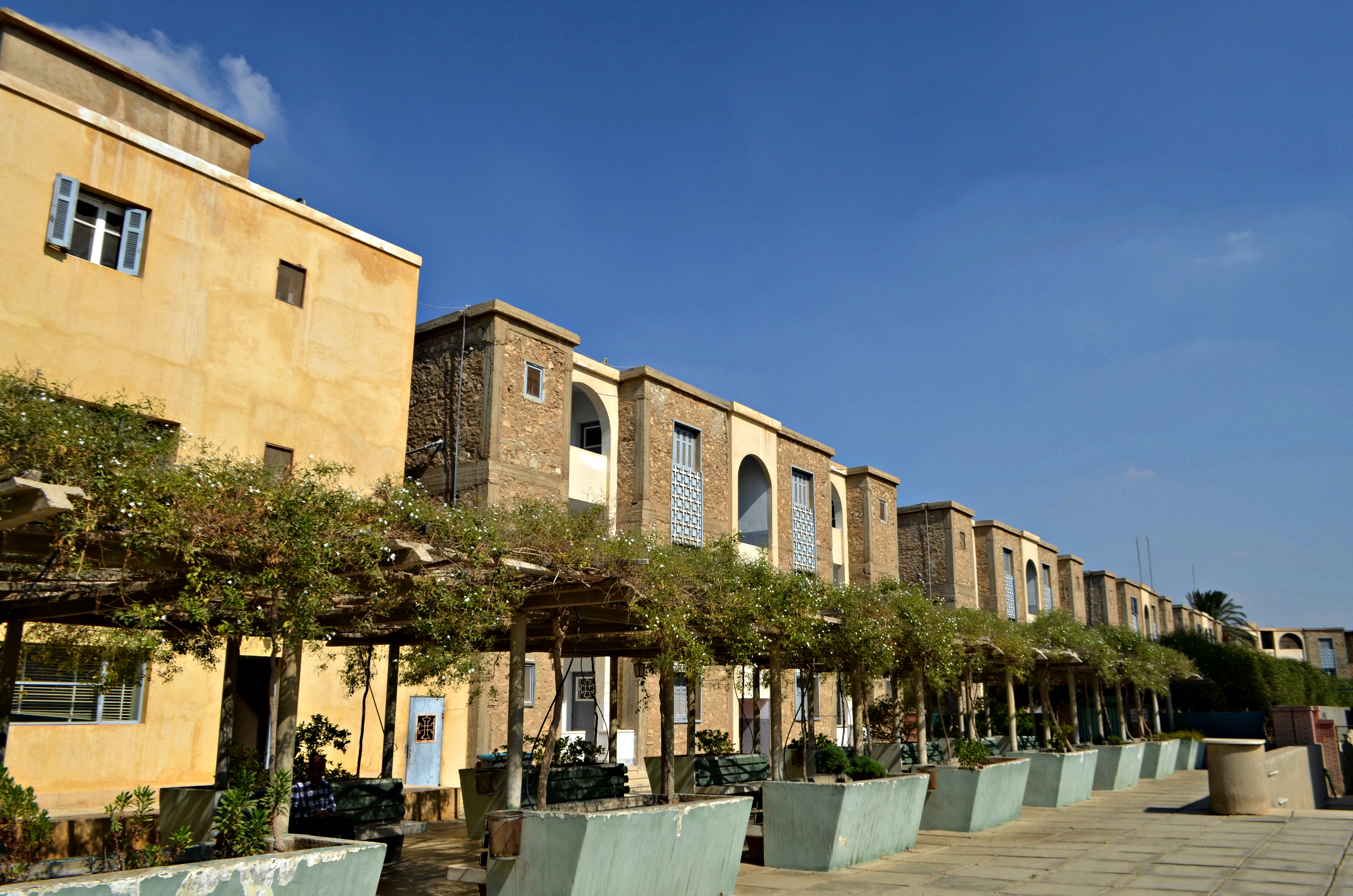
The monks' cellars are to the right of the monastery's hostess.

The monk cells (qallali) serve as the primary living quarters for the monks. The monastery contains numerous cells, many of which were constructed in recent times. Among these are cells surrounding the courtyard on the western, eastern, and northern sides. Each cluster typically consists of six or seven ground-level cells. These cells are structured with two rooms: an inner and an outer chamber.

==== Historical Overview of the Cells ====
- Northern Cells: Likely date back to the 16th or 17th century.
- Eastern Cells: Believed to have been constructed during the 18th century.
- Patriarch's Cell: Located at the southern end of the row facing the main entrance, this small structure is known as the Patriarch’s Cell, dating back to the 6th century.

Parallel to the Patriarch’s Cell is another chamber once said to have housed the remains of the 49 martyrs slain during a Berber raid. These relics were later moved to their dedicated church within the monastery.

Additionally, the monastery preserves a few cells from the 18th century, maintained as examples of historical monastic living quarters. These are situated south of the Church of Saint Macarius.

=== The Refectory (Al-Ma'eda) ===
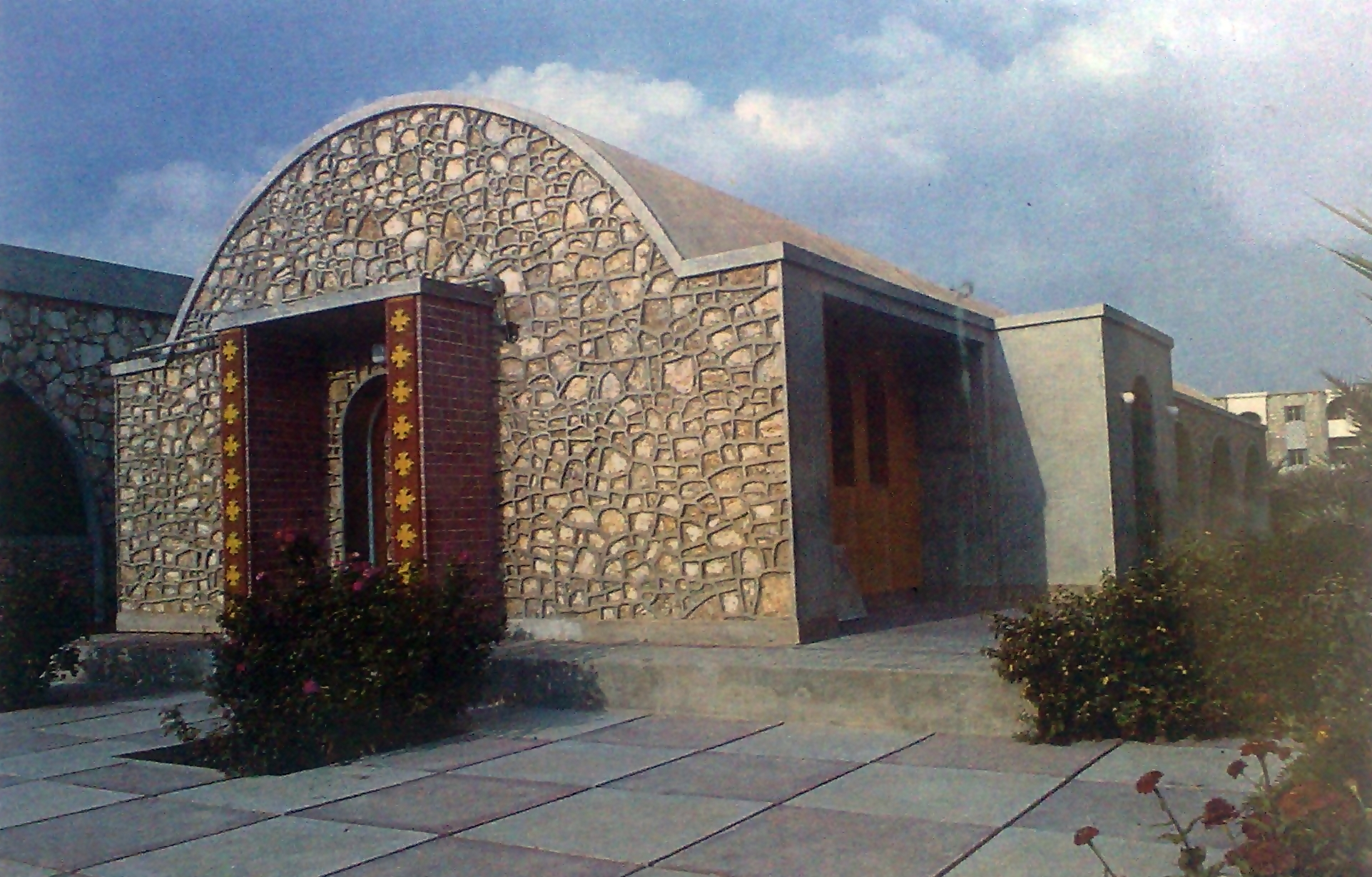
The eastern facade of the Modern Table, where the monks gather at 12 noon to eat the day's meal together.

The refectory, or communal dining hall, serves as the monks' dining area within the monastery. It can be accessed through a doorway located at its northwestern corner. The current structure dates back to the 11th or 12th century.

Unlike most Coptic monasteries, where the refectory is typically adjacent to the western wall of the main church, the refectory at Saint Macarius occupies an unusual position. It is speculated that it might have originally been connected to the Church of Saint Abaskhiron Al-Qellini.

Historical records suggest that the refectory was larger before its destruction. The monks rebuilt it in its current form during the 11th or 12th century, though it now occupies a fraction of its original size.

=== Fence and extensions ===
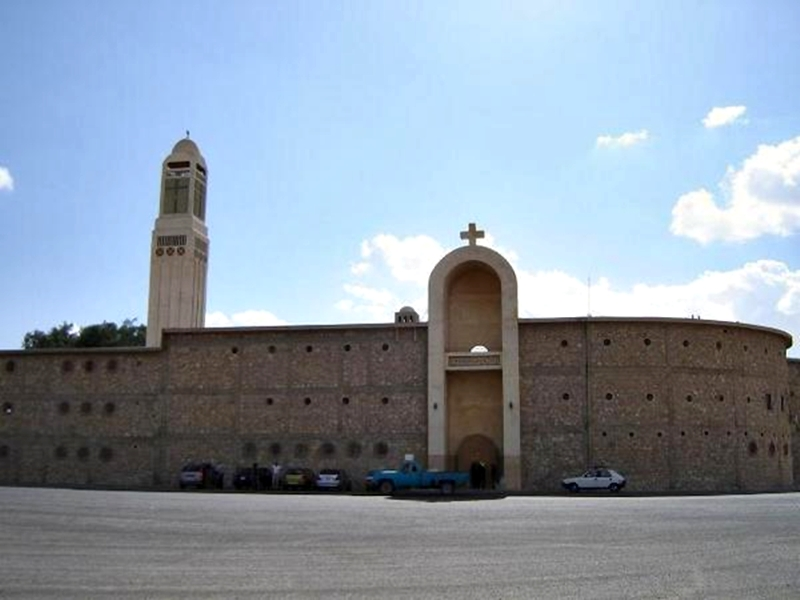
The monastery wall with one of its gates.

Originally, the monastery was built within an irregular rectangular area, surrounded by high walls with an average height of 14 meters. The width of the wall at the monastery's entrance was no less than 3.5 meters. The walls were devoid of any decorations, except for a large cross etched on the whitewashed surface of the southern wall's exterior.

However, the area of the monastery was reduced by half after the collapse of the northern and eastern walls. This occurred during a period when the number of monks was relatively low, leading to the abandonment of the original space and the rebuilding of the northern and eastern walls in their current locations. This change is believed to have taken place before 1330, as referenced in the description of Pope Benjamin II's visit to the monastery, where he passed through the arched entrance, a remnant of the old structure.

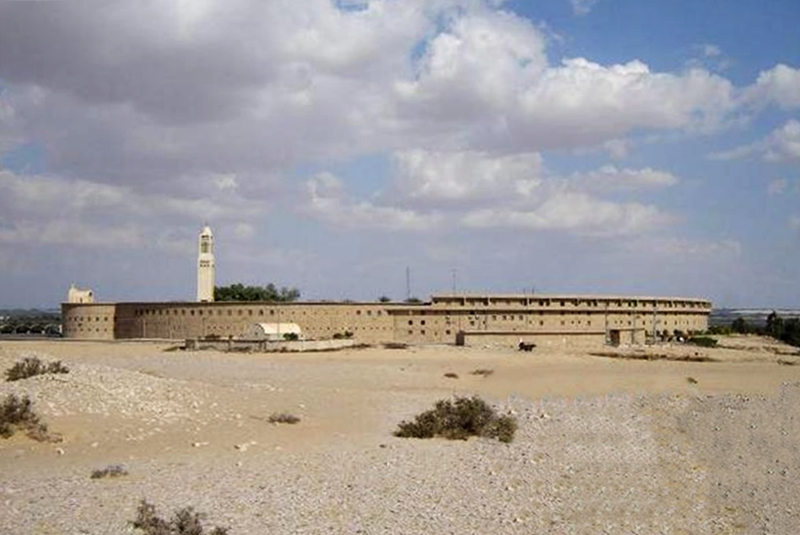
The wall surrounding the monastery.

The eastern wall of the monastery contains two entrances, which is unusual since most monasteries typically have their entrance in the northern wall. During restoration work in 1969, the monk Matta El Meskeen discovered the original ancient door of the monastery in the northern section of the eastern wall, equipped with a brick arch. However, the door was disassembled at the time.

Given that having two entrances is uncommon in monasteries, it is likely that the first entrance led to the grain silos and storage areas, located in the southern section within the walls, which housed the monastery's utilities. The second entrance was probably reserved for ceremonial processions in the Church of St. Macarius.

The room built above the northern entrance still remains, though the guard building has since disappeared. The current dome over the entrance, constructed of red brick, dates back to 1911. Additionally, the southern entrance in the eastern wall, which is now sealed, retains traces of a ruined cell on its northern side. This cell, once covered by a semi-dome, is believed to have been the dwelling of the gatekeeper monk.

=== The Monastery's Fortress ===
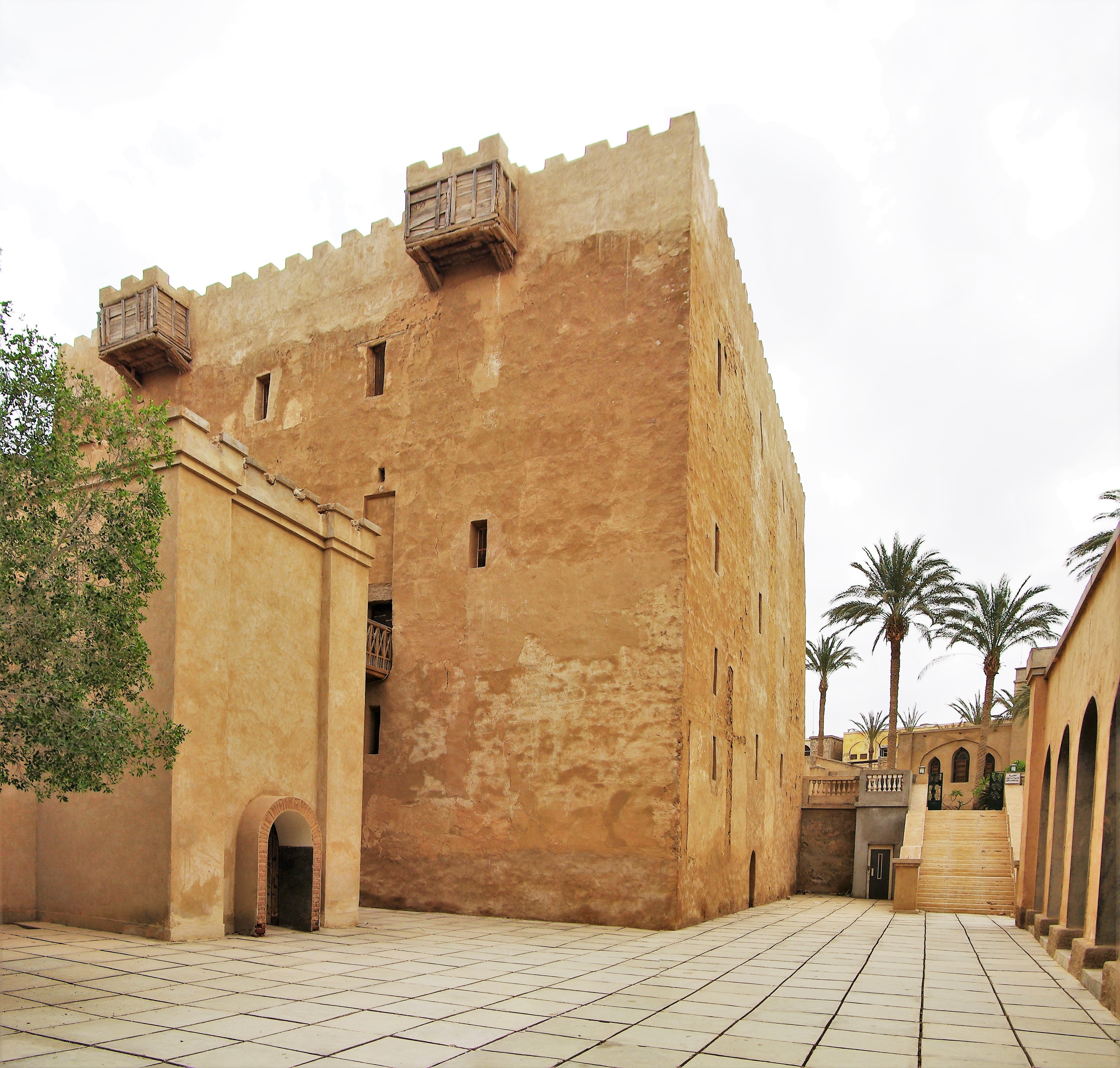
The monastery fortress where the monks took refuge from Berber raids.

The fortress of the monastery is a square structure, with each side measuring 21.5 meters in length and a height of 16 meters. Its walls are constructed from large, unpolished stone blocks, and the exterior is coated with a layer of plaster. This fortress was designed to provide protection for the monastery during times of attack, reflecting the need for defense in the region.

The fortress of the monastery was constructed between the years 1069 and 1196. Evidence supporting this timeline includes the fact that the last destruction of the fortifications of the Wadi El-Natrun monasteries occurred during a Berber raid in 1069. Additionally, a Syriac inscription found on the southern wall of the Archangel Michael Church within the fortress dates back to 1196.

The architectural features of the fortress belong to the 11th century. Its arches, constructed with brick, are similar in style to those of the Mosque of Al-Hakim bi-Amr Allah in Cairo. The domes resemble those in Upper Egypt, specifically in the tombs of Al-Bajawat in the Kharga Oasis, and are also akin to those in the monastery of the Virgin Mary - Syrians in Wadi El-Natrun.

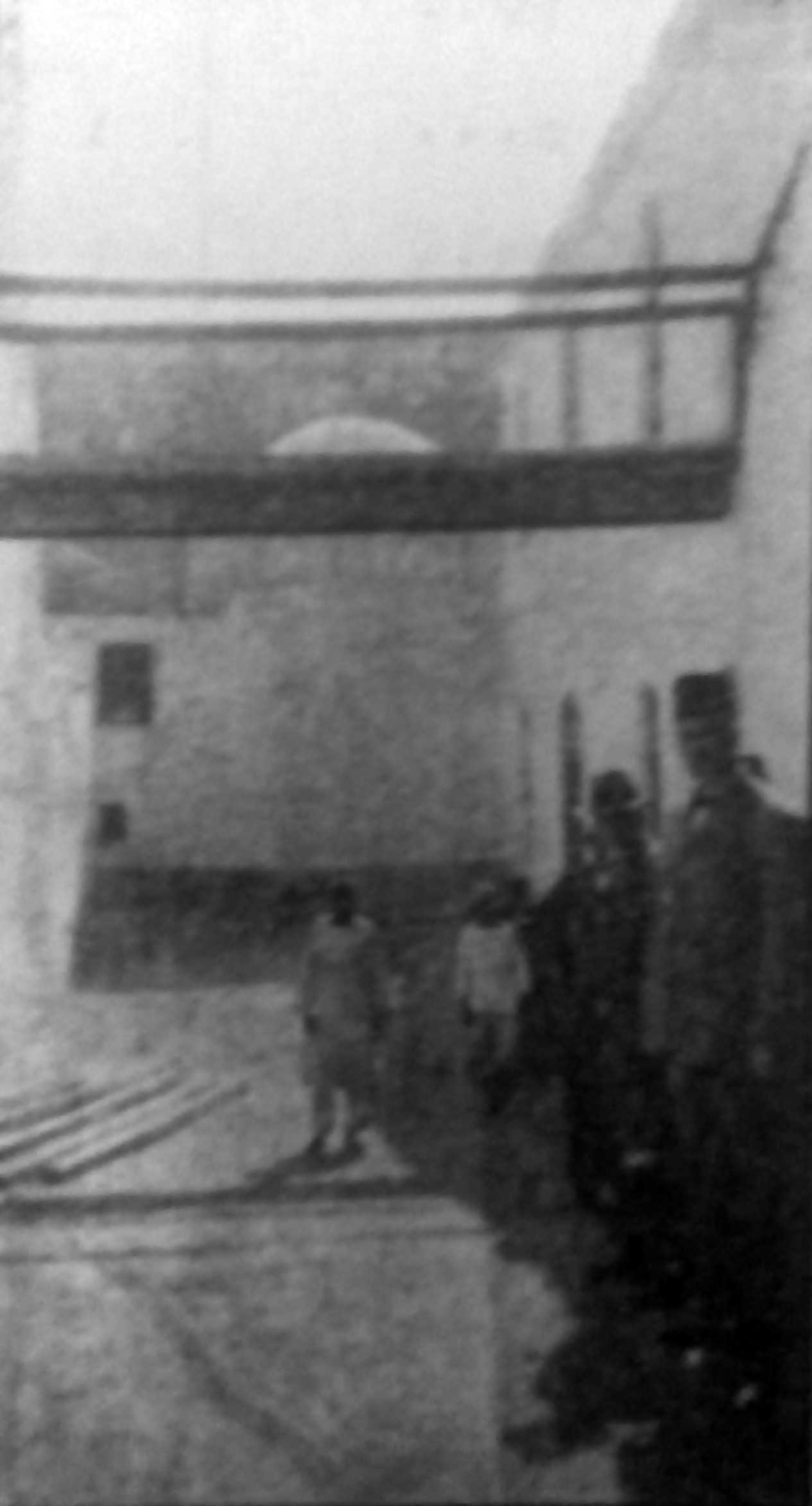
The drawbridge connected to the monastery fortress in 1935 (89 years ago).

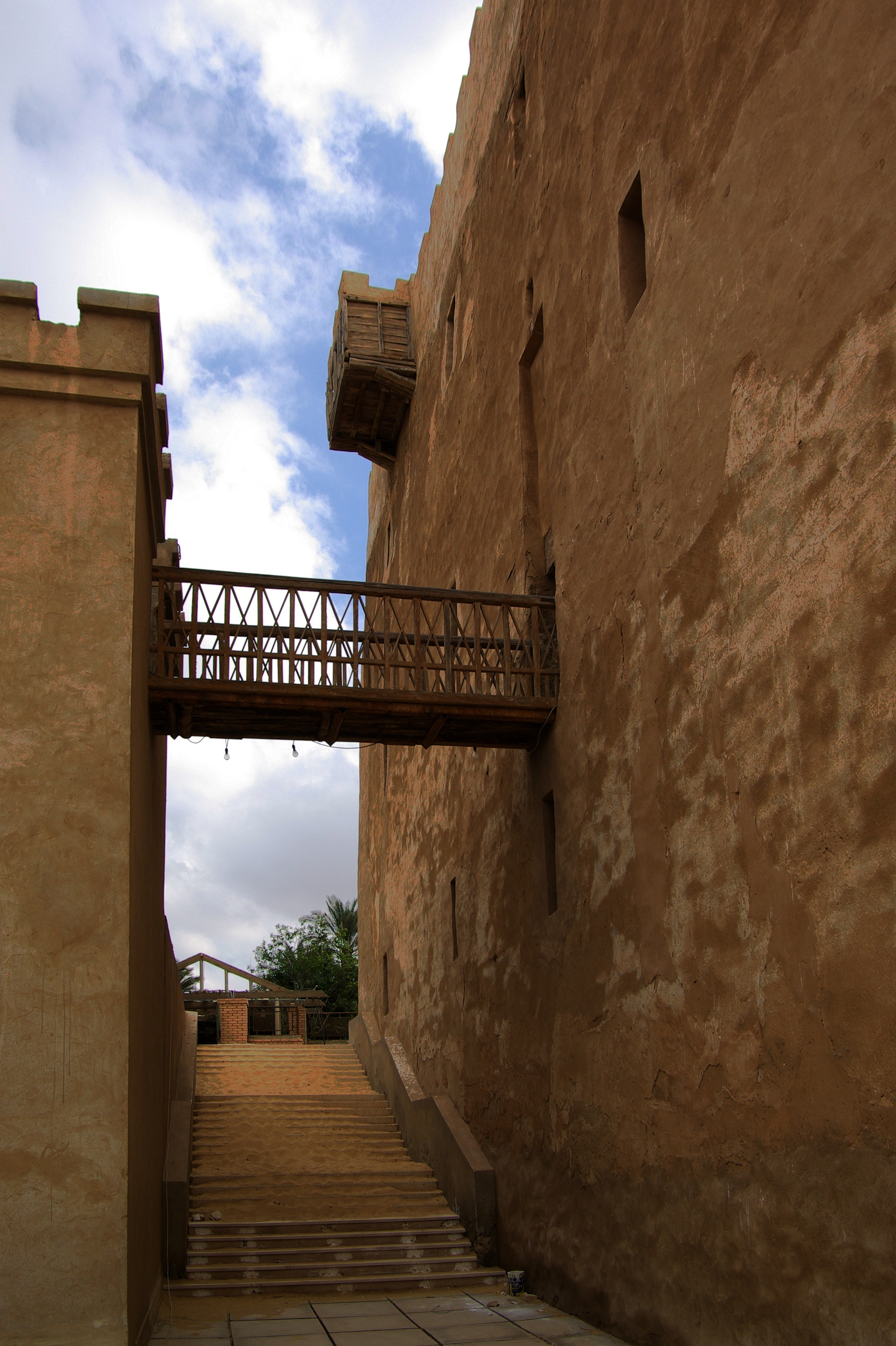
The monastery fortress where the monks took refuge from Berber raids.

The fortress consists of three levels: a ground floor and two upper floors. Each floor is divided into two sections: the eastern part, which occupies two-thirds of the space, and the western part, which occupies the remaining third. A corridor runs along the north-south axis, connecting different rooms on each floor.

- Ground Floor: The ground floor has three large, double rooms in the eastern section. Each room is divided into two parts by two massive stone pillars, each supporting a pointed arch made of red bricks. The six sections are covered with semicircular vaulted ceilings. These rooms likely served as storerooms for grain. The western rooms included one with an oil press.
- First Floor: The first floor has the only entrance to the fortress located in the northern section, which is a small rectangular door currently unused. A fixed wooden bridge, previously movable, provides access to the entrance. The southern part of the first floor includes a small bathroom. The eastern section houses the Virgin Mary Church, while the western section contains three rooms. The central room of these is home to the last remaining wine press in the fortress, while another room serves as a secret storage space for unused pottery.
- Second Floor: The second floor once housed the monastery's library. Currently, the eastern section contains three churches, separated by walls.

This fortress is a structure, both in terms of its defensive purpose and its historical architecture, reflecting the needs and practices of monastic life in medieval Egypt.

== Monastery churches ==
The monastery, excluding the fortress, contains three churches out of a total of seven: Anba Makar Church, the Church of Abaskhiron the Soldier, and the Church of the Elders.

=== Anba Makar Church ===
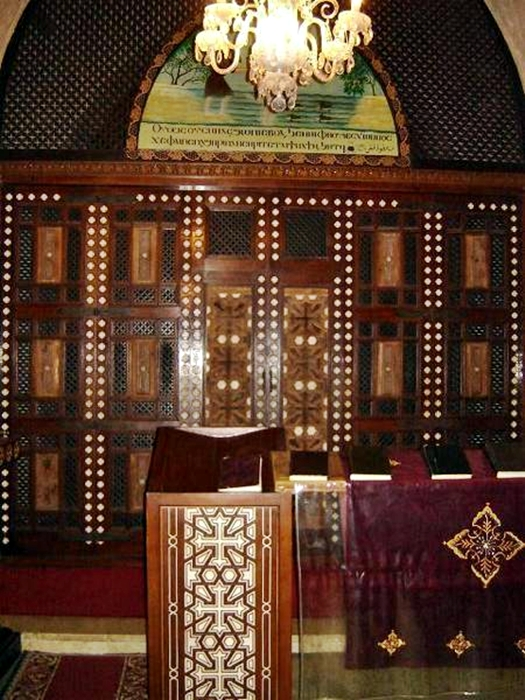
The veil of the northern temple called the Temple of John the Baptist in the church of Anba Makar.

The main church of the monastery consists of a transverse nave that extends from north to south, with three sanctuaries. The building of the church is the remains of an older structure. Between 1976 and 1978, a sanctuary was added to the south of the council cell, named the Sanctuary of the Three Youths, which has the same shape and size as the central sanctuary. During the 12th and 14th centuries, there were four sanctuaries: two to the north and two to the south of a central room that served as a council chamber. In 1929, the church’s nave and the monastery’s current minaret were added. The middle and northern sanctuaries date back to the medieval period and are dedicated to St. Benjamin and St. Mark the Evangelist, respectively, while the southern sanctuary was the "Council Cell," which was located between the sanctuaries in earlier times.

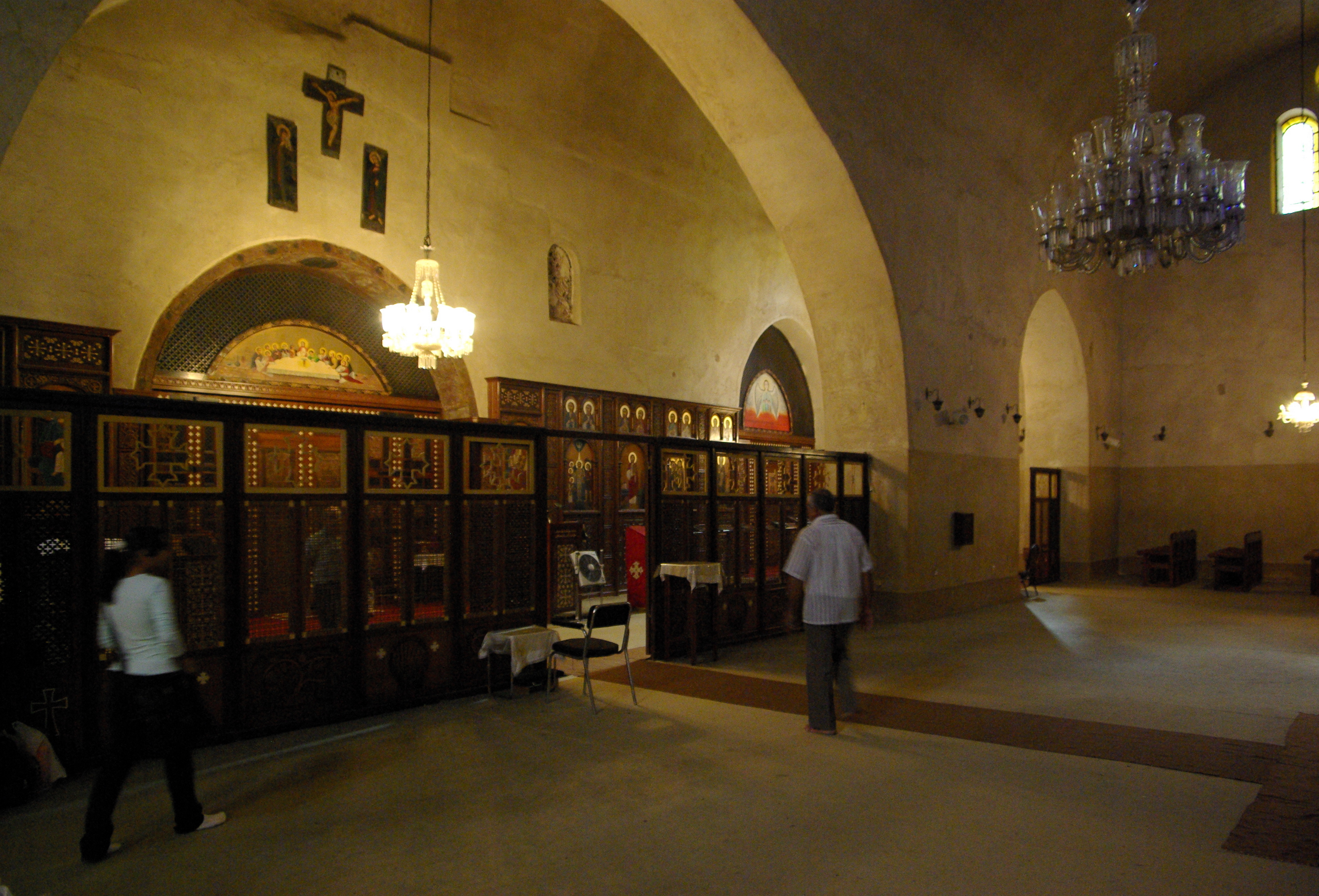
The Temple of Bishop Benjamin, which is the center temple.

The nave of the church is rectangular in shape, which is typical of Coptic churches. In the western wall of the nave, there are two modern doors, each with wide arches that lead to the old fortress. The nave has been nearly completely renovated with the addition of columns and reinforced concrete arches to strengthen it. It is noteworthy that the wooden coffin containing the relics of the three Macariuses was transferred to the Church of Abba Skeryon, where the relics of John the Short are kept. The bodies of the three Macariuses are now preserved in a new shrine in the second nave of the church, alongside the bodies of the patriarchs.

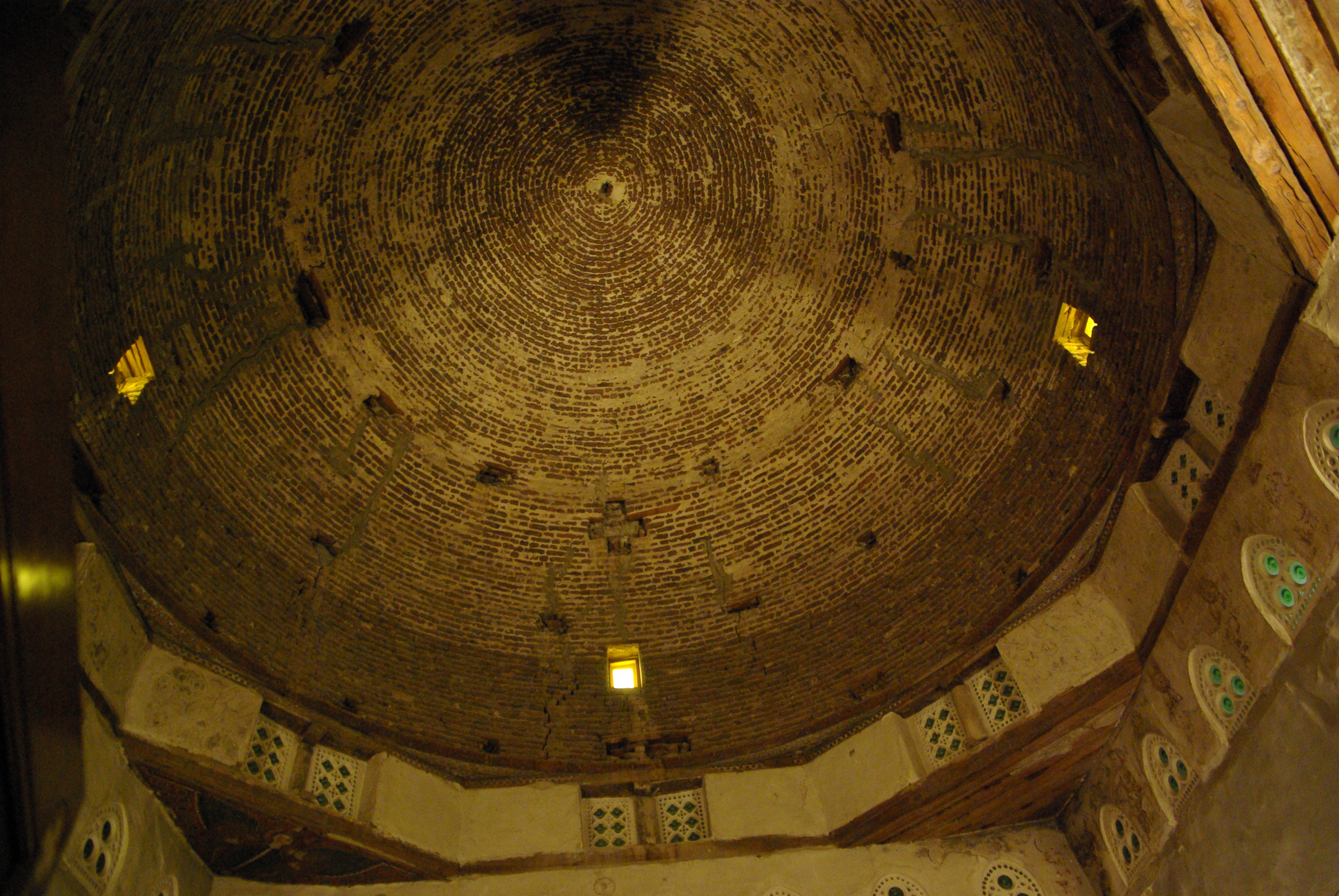
The dome of the Temple of Bishop Benjamin.

The central sanctuary of the church is called the Sanctuary of St. Benjamin, and it is topped with a wide, slightly pointed arch in the center. In 1911, construction began on buttresses to reinforce the structure, as the main dome of the sanctuary had cracked on its southern side. The current screen of the sanctuary contains fillings and doors from the original screen, which dates back to the 11th or 13th century. This sanctuary has a square shape, and it is covered by a red brick dome. The current altar is covered with a marble slab. On the eastern wall of this sanctuary, there is a staircase consisting of three steps that extend along the length of the wall.

The southern sanctuary, also known as the "Cella of the Council," is a long, narrow room covered by a wooden ceiling. The eastern wall of this sanctuary does not feature any niches or recesses. This sanctuary was constructed by Pope Zacharias I and is currently used as a storage room for church utensils.

The current northern sanctuary is called the "Sanctuary of St. Mark," and it is also referred to as the Sanctuary of St. John the Baptist and the Prophet Elisha. It has a square shape and was built in the 11th century. The entrance to this sanctuary is a wide, pointed arch that opens from the western annex into the sanctuary. In 1975, a new screen was installed, featuring inserts in the Fatimid style, and placed in the outer arch of the sanctuary, marking the beginning of the northern sanctuary's nave. The sanctuary is covered by a modern dome, built in 1912, with an octagonal base that suits the square shape of the sanctuary. The altar is placed on a raised floor, elevated above the rest of the sanctuary.

=== Church of the Abaskhiron the Soldier ===
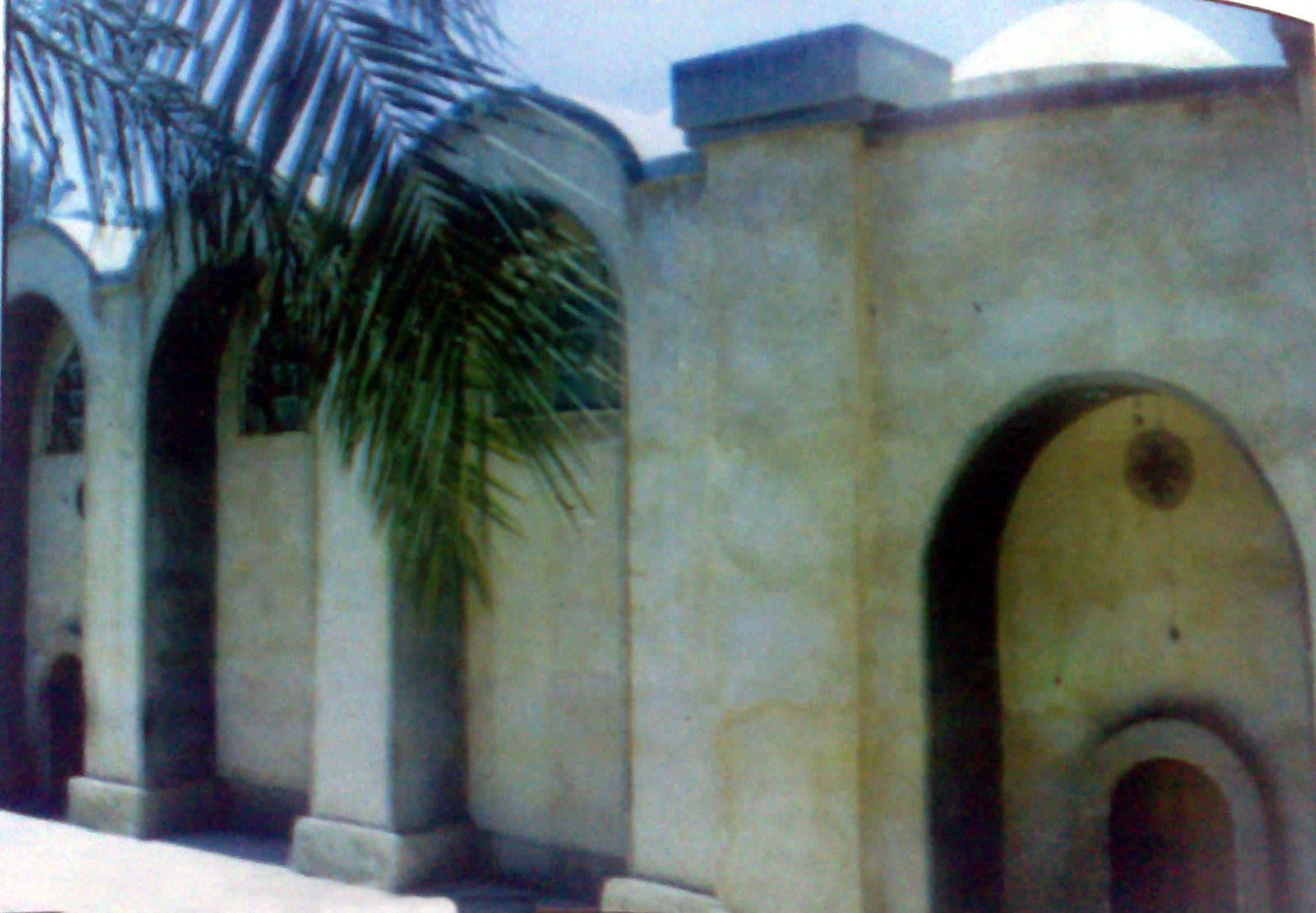
The exterior of the Basilica of Abascheron.

This church is dedicated to the martyr Abaskeiron al-Qalini, who is associated with the city of Qalin, southeast of the city of Desouk in the northern Nile Delta. The church follows the design of short churches and consists of a nave, a choir, and three sanctuaries.

Regarding the three sanctuaries, the central sanctuary has a modern screen dating back to 1866. It is covered by a low dome supported by vaulted arches at the corners of the sanctuary. The altar is covered with a marble slab. Two doors were opened in the central sanctuary, one leading to the northern sanctuary and the other to the southern sanctuary. The southern sanctuary dates back to the late 14th century. Its dome is modest in construction, supported by vaulted arches. The altar slab is made of broken pieces of marble arranged without any particular order.

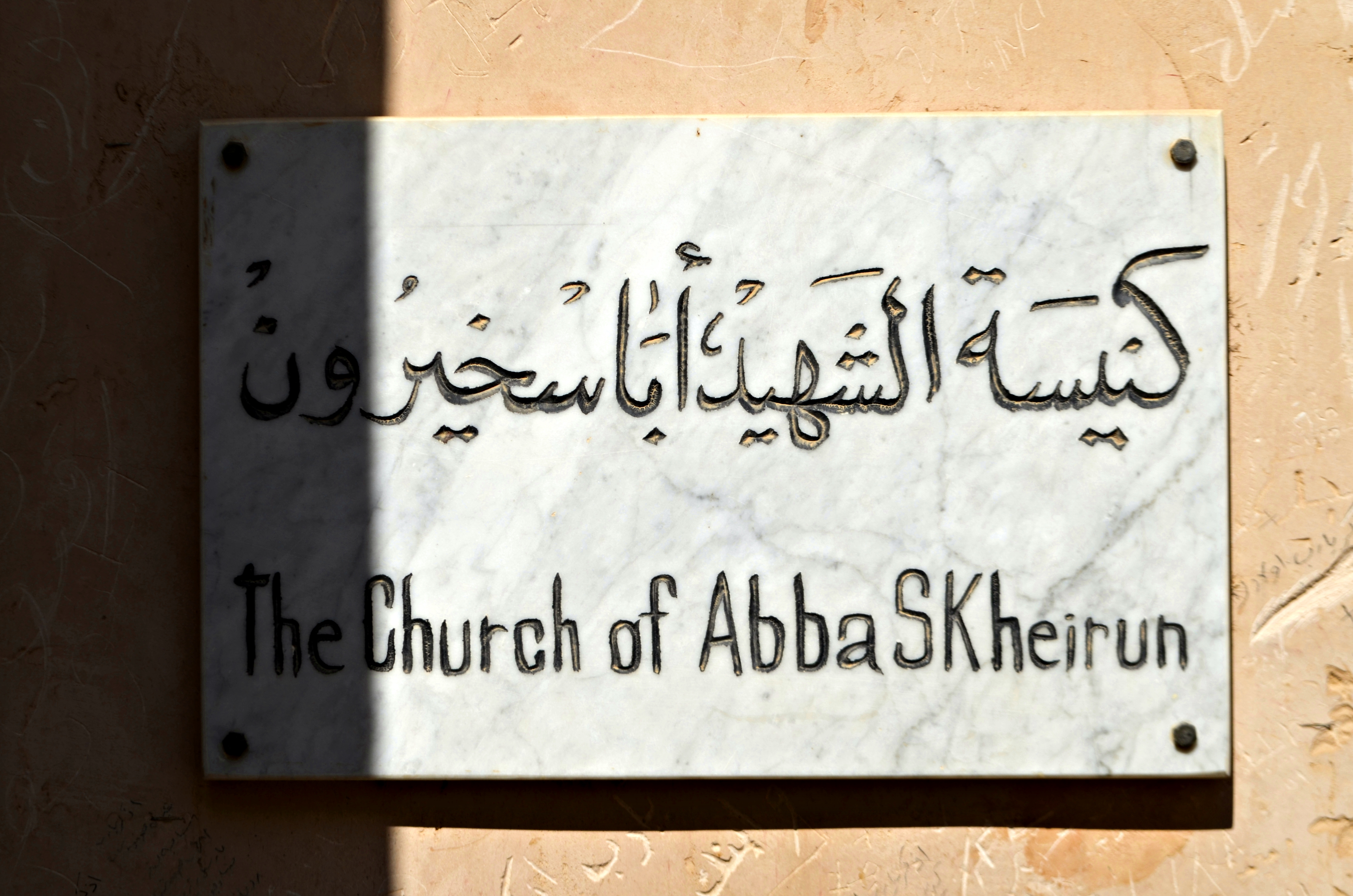
The marble sign of the Basilica of Abascheron.

The northern sanctuary is currently unused. Although much of its entrance width has been reduced, the external boundary of the original arch is still visible, along with red and white painted brickwork framed in a rectangular outline with a square opening above it. This sanctuary lacks an altar, and its original dome has been replaced by a smaller, poorly constructed dome. The northern sanctuary was consecrated in the name of Saint John the Short, whose body is still preserved in a wooden shrine in the choir.

There is no clear evidence to determine the exact date of the church's construction, but it is likely to have existed before the collapse that occurred in the mid-14th century. It is also mentioned that Pope Benjamin II visited and supervised repairs in the monastery. The vaults covering the nave and choir, along with their northern door, date back to the 13th century. In contrast, the central and southern sanctuaries display architectural features that suggest they were built after the 14th century. Overall, the church contains both original elements and later additions. The two vaults covering the southern part of the choir and nave, along with the dividing wall between them, are later additions, while the southern parts of the choir and nave themselves are modern additions.

=== Church of the Elders ===
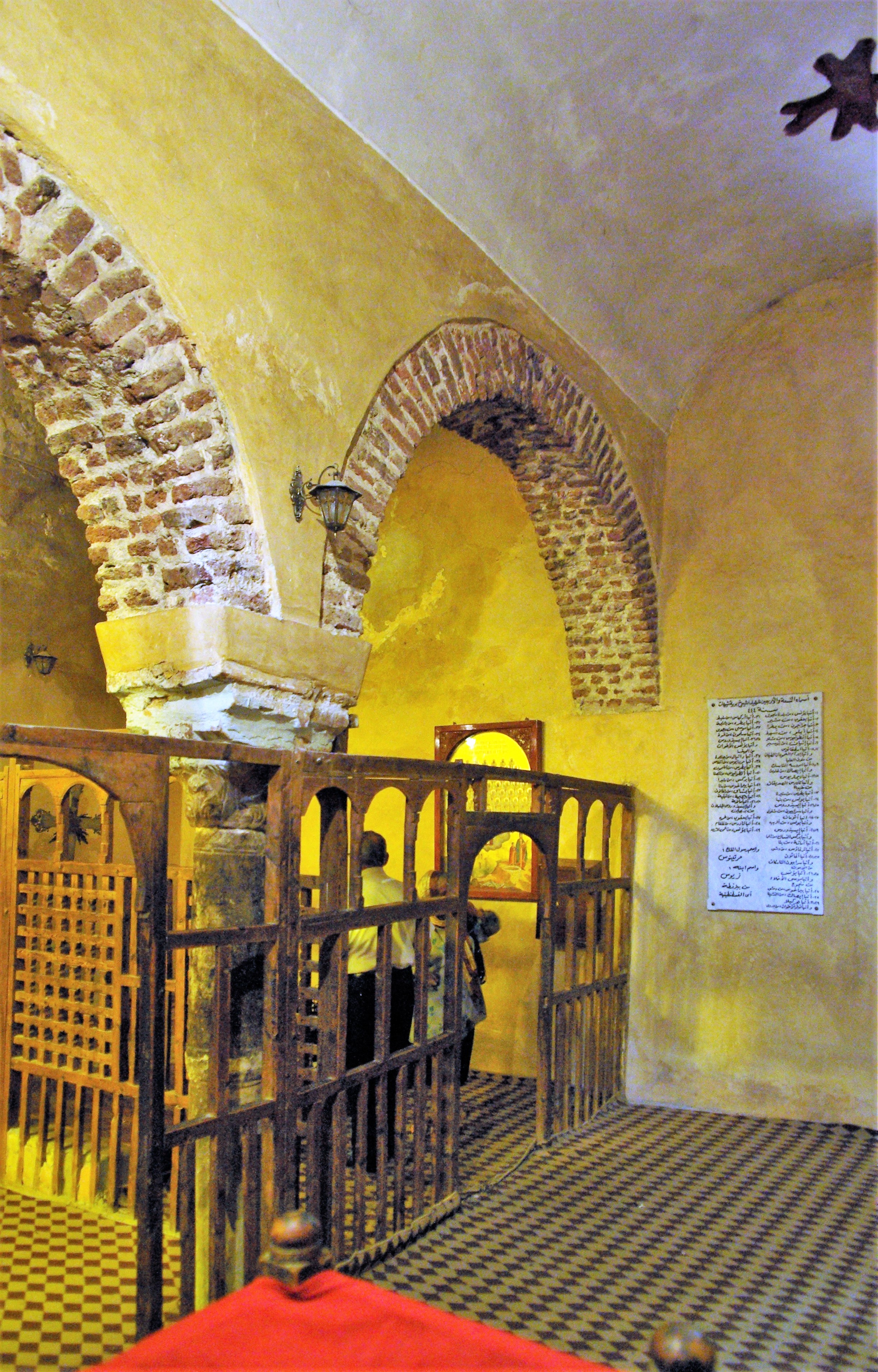
The interior of the church.

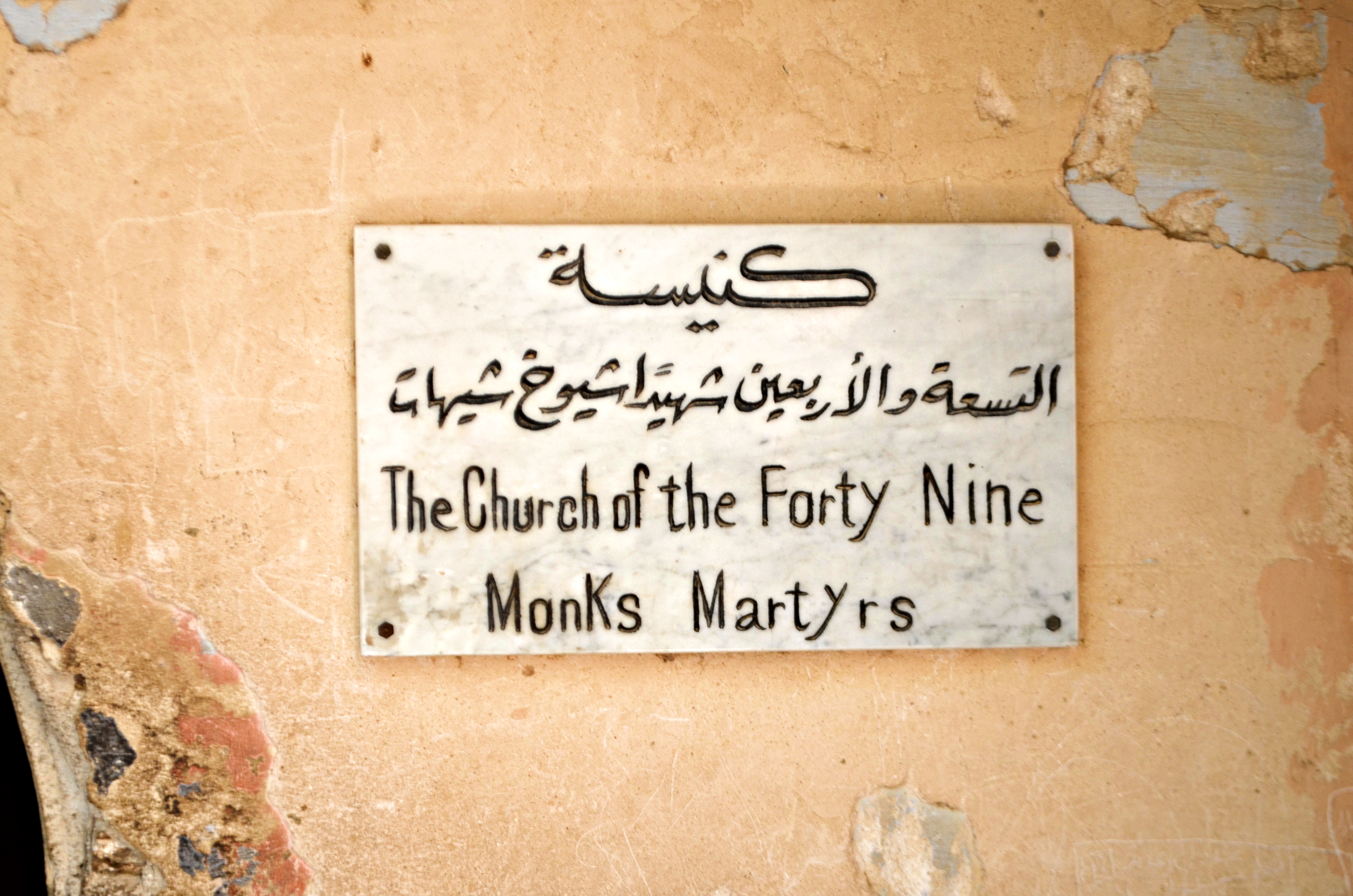
The marble sign of the Church of the Elders.

The Church of the Forty-Nine Martyrs, also known as the Church of the Elders of Shehat (or Shehit), was established in remembrance of the elders who were slaughtered by the Berbers along with the messenger of the king and his son during their third raid on the monasteries of Wadi al-Natrun in the year 444. The church follows the design of short churches, similar to the Church of Abaskeiron. It consists of a covered entrance located at the southwestern corner, followed by a nave and a parallel choir. To the east of the choir, there is a single sanctuary.

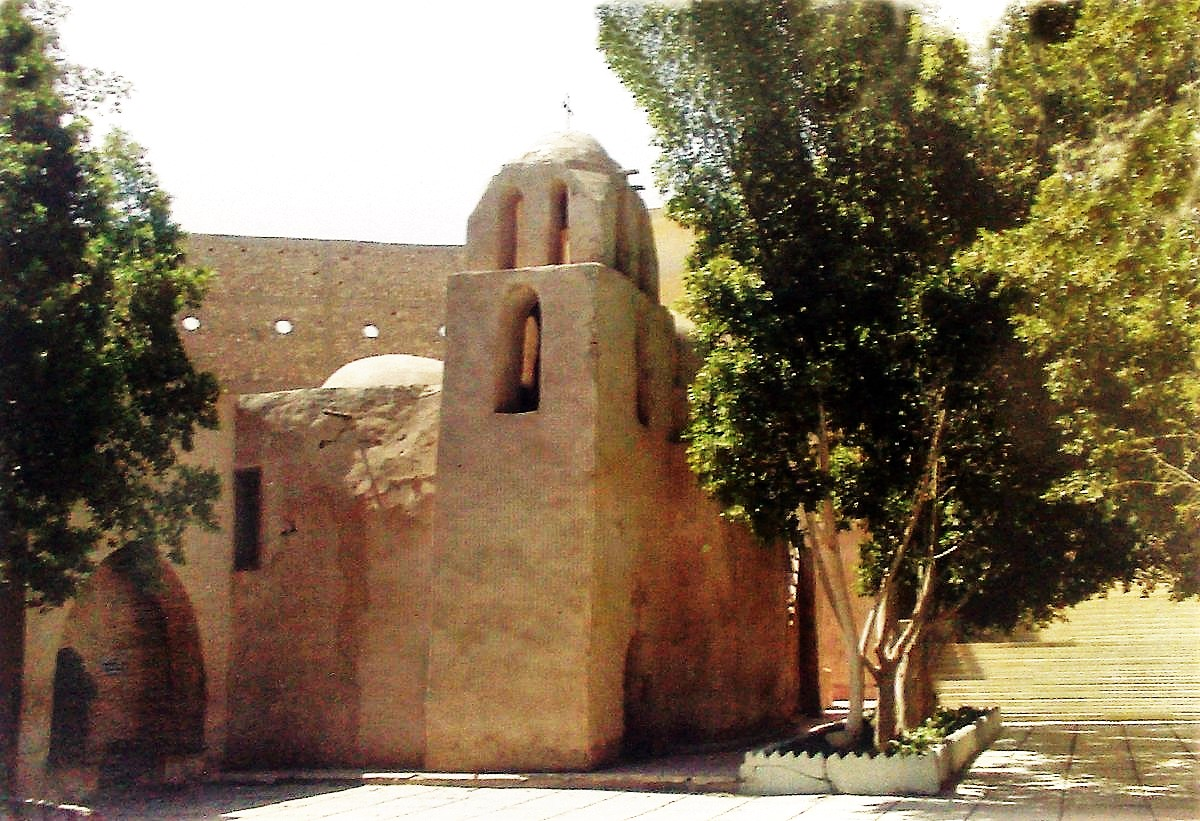
The east and south facade of the church, with the entrance on the left and the bell tower in the center.

A small bell tower is attached to the church at the southeastern corner. The nave is covered by a semi-cylindrical vault supported by a transverse arch, and it is separated from the choir by a wooden barrier. Behind this barrier, the floor rises to form a platform where the remains of the forty-nine elders are interred. The nave is separated from the choir to the east by four rows of arches (four bays), and above each pair of bays is a semi-cylindrical vault. The choir is also covered by a semi-cylindrical vault, except for the area in front of the sanctuary, which is covered by a dome supported by two transverse arches over the first and second columns on the eastern wall of the choir.

The sanctuary has a wooden screen dating back to 1866. The sanctuary’s dome is a semi-spherical shape, supported by four vaults, each with three points. The church was originally built around 528 during the papacy of Pope Theodosius I, and it was consecrated during the papacy of Pope Benjamin II in the 7th century. However, the church later fell into disrepair and was renovated in the 18th century.

== Fortress churches ==
The fortress, excluding the rest of the monastery, contains four of the total seven churches. These are: the Church of the Mary, mother of Jesus, Al-Sawah Church, the Church of Anthony the Great, and the Church of Michael.

=== Church of the Mary, mother of Jesus ===
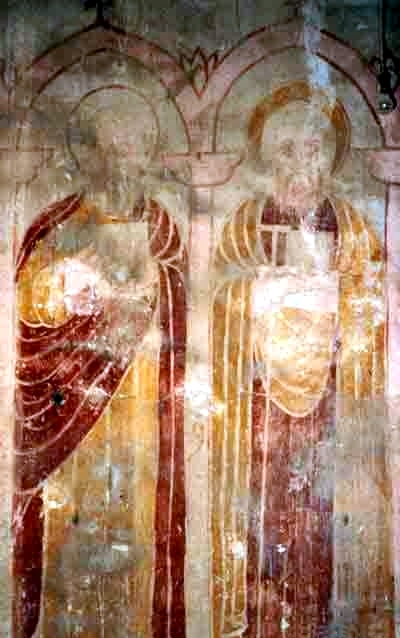
A fresco depicting Anba Abib on the right and Anba Maysael the tourist on the left.

The church is dedicated to the Virgin Mary and was built between 1874 and 1880. It consists of a small nave, a sanctuary, and a three-altar structure. Each of the three sections of the church is covered by a dome, and a partition separates the nave from the sanctuary. The walls and domes are covered with a relatively recent layer of plaster. The three altars of the church are raised on a single platform. The northern altar was covered with a marble slab, while the southern altar features a design combining square and semi-circular shapes, and the central altar has a rectangular slab. These three altar slabs were later moved to the monastery's museum.

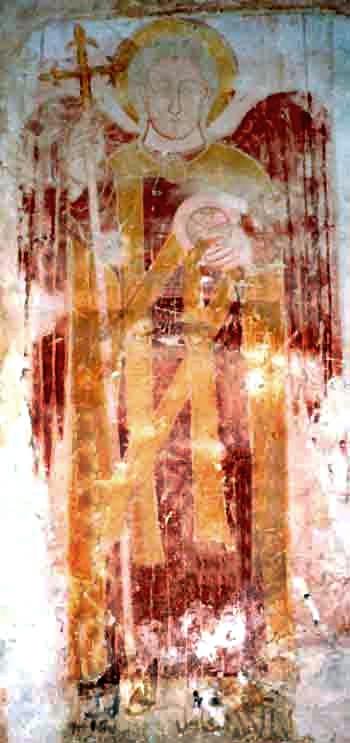
A fresco depicting the angel Michael holding his spear at the Angel Michael Church.

=== Al-Sawah Church ===
This is the southern church among the three churches in the fortress, established in the early 16th century. It was consecrated by Pope John XIII in 1517 (507 years ago) and is named the Church of the Nine Wanderers, dedicated to the following saints:

- St. Samuel the Confessor
- St. Yohannes (John), Bishop of Shehit
- Abba Nofr the Wanderer
- St. Abram
- St. George
- St. Apollo
- St. Abib
- St. Michael the Wanderer
- St. Bagimy

Inside, the church is divided into a nave and a sanctuary, separated by a wooden partition. There is also a floor opening leading to a crypt beneath the central vestibule. The church contains a single altar, separated from the sanctuary by a partition, with the central part made of wood. The altar is hollow inside, and it originally had a black marble slab, which is now preserved in the monastery's museum.

=== Church of Anthony the Great ===
This church is located north of the Church of the Wanderers and was also consecrated in the early 16th century. It shares many basic features with the Church of the Wanderers. Although there is currently no nave or sanctuary, remnants of a partition suggest that a screen might have once separated the sanctuary from the nave.

The altar is covered by a small brick dome supported by four large wooden beams and four additional wooden cross-ties at the corners where the main beams intersect. The altar features a rectangular marble slab, which originally served as its top.

=== Church of Michael ===
The northernmost church among the three in the eastern section of the second floor of the monastery fortress, the Church of the Archangel Michael, was consecrated between the late 14th and early 15th centuries. It is the only church in the Monastery of Saint Macarius with a basilica layout.

The church has a rectangular floor plan with a western extension. Its interior is divided longitudinally into three sections: a central nave and two aisles (north and south), separated by two rows of marble columns. These columns originally supported a wooden, double-level roof. However, due to the slenderness and instability of the columns, parts of the roof collapsed, leading to their removal and replacement with a reinforced concrete roof.

A transverse wall separates the choir from the rest of the church, featuring three openings for access to the choir. The western vestibule is narrower than the main body of the church and also contains a transverse barrier.

The sanctuary is elevated by one step above the choir and is covered by a semi-circular brick dome. This dome rests on an octagonal wooden base, partially supported by two marble columns embedded in the eastern wall of the sanctuary. The altar features a marble slab combining square and semi-circular shapes.

Opposite the southern wall of the sanctuary is a large, modern wooden chest used to store relics of saints.

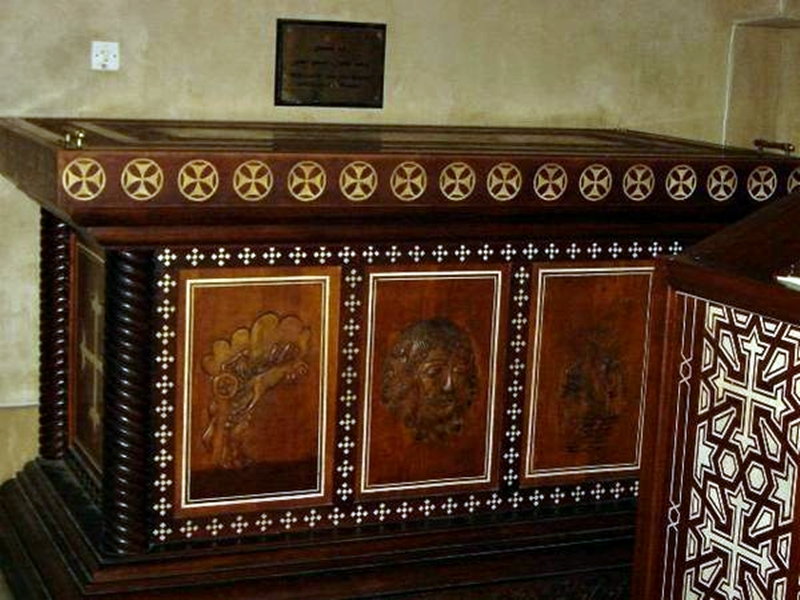
The wooden compartment where the remains of John the Baptist and Elisha were deposited.

== Discovery of the Relics of Prophets John the Baptist and Elisha ==
For centuries, an oral tradition passed down among the elders of the Monastery of Saint Macarius held that a burial site for Prophets John the Baptist and Elisha, along with other saints, was located near the northern wall of the Church of Saint Macarius. This belief centered around a small, protruding column, in front of which incense was regularly offered as a mark of reverence, despite the burial site itself being obscured.

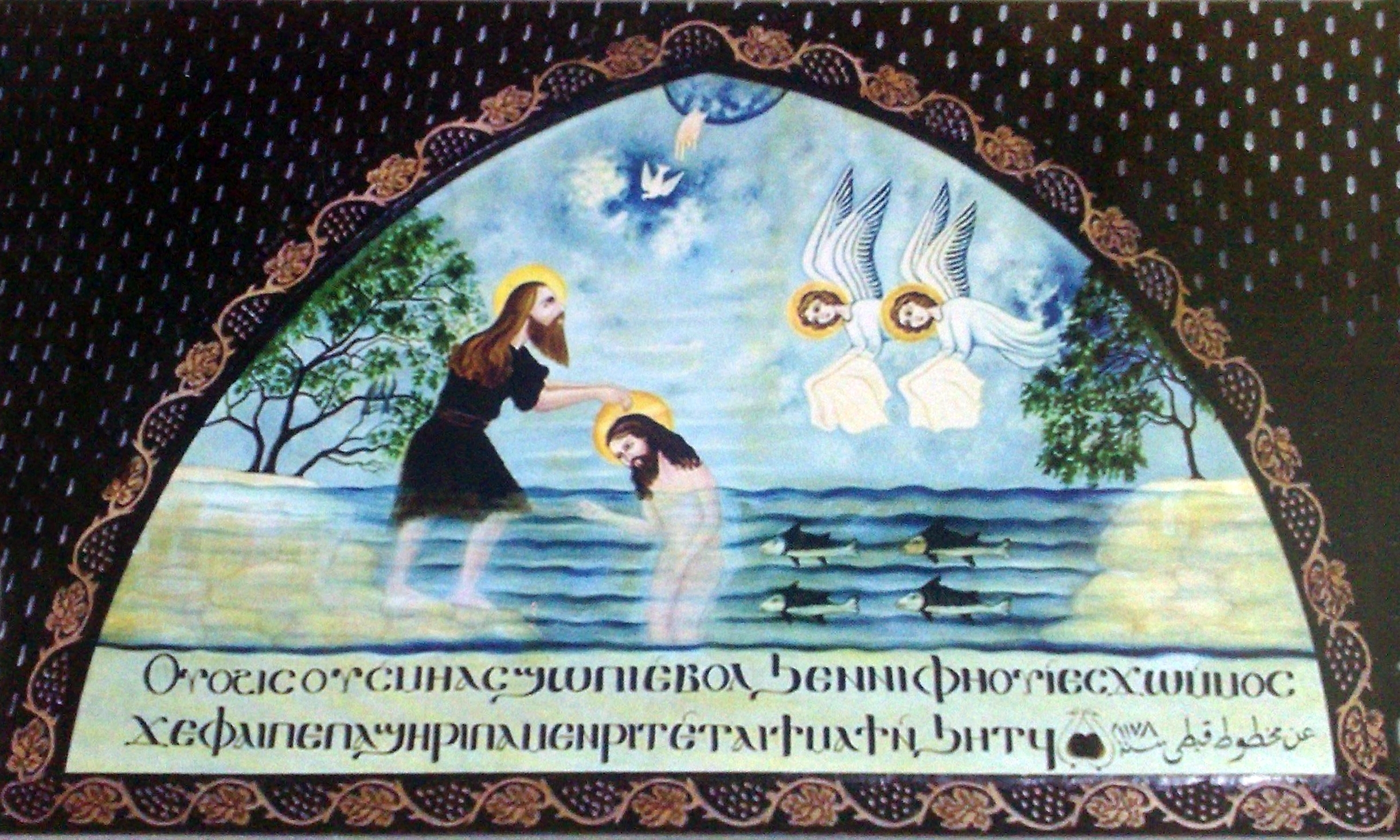
The icon of Christ's baptism at the hands of John the Baptist, which is located above the veil of the Temple of John the Baptist in Anba Makar Church.

In 1976, during the Great Lent, restoration and expansion works commenced on the Church of Saint Macarius. As part of these efforts, large amounts of debris were removed to reach the church’s original floor. During the excavation, a noticeable protrusion was uncovered on the northern wall, resembling an arch coated with blue plaster. Beneath it, a large wooden box, measuring over two meters in length, was found. This box turned out to be the coffin of Father Joseph, a 19th-century abbot of the monastery and brother of Pope Demetrius II.

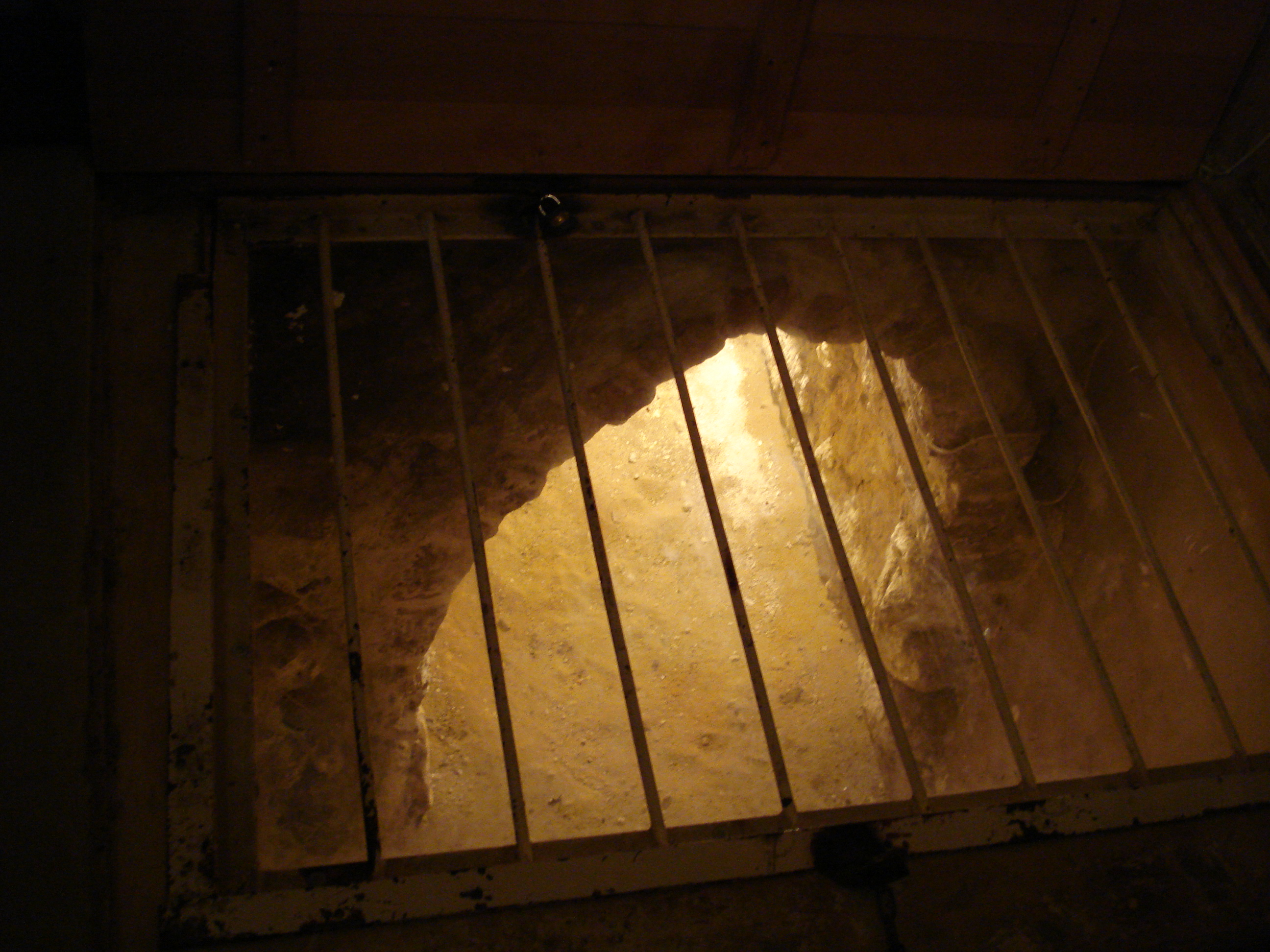
The crypt found under the floor of the Anba Makkar Church, in front of the Temple of John the Baptist, contained the remains of the prophets Elisha and John the Baptist.

After the coffin was removed, skeletal remains were discovered more than a meter and a half below the surface. Some remains were found as complete skeletons, arranged according to the Coptic burial rite, while others were neatly stacked. Beneath these bones was a layer of reddish soil, believed to be the remnants of decomposed wooden coffins, suggesting that the relics had originally been interred in wooden containers, which had disintegrated over time.

The relics were carefully collected and temporarily placed in a wooden box. Plans were made to construct a proper shrine to house the remains, ensuring their respectful preservation and continued veneration.

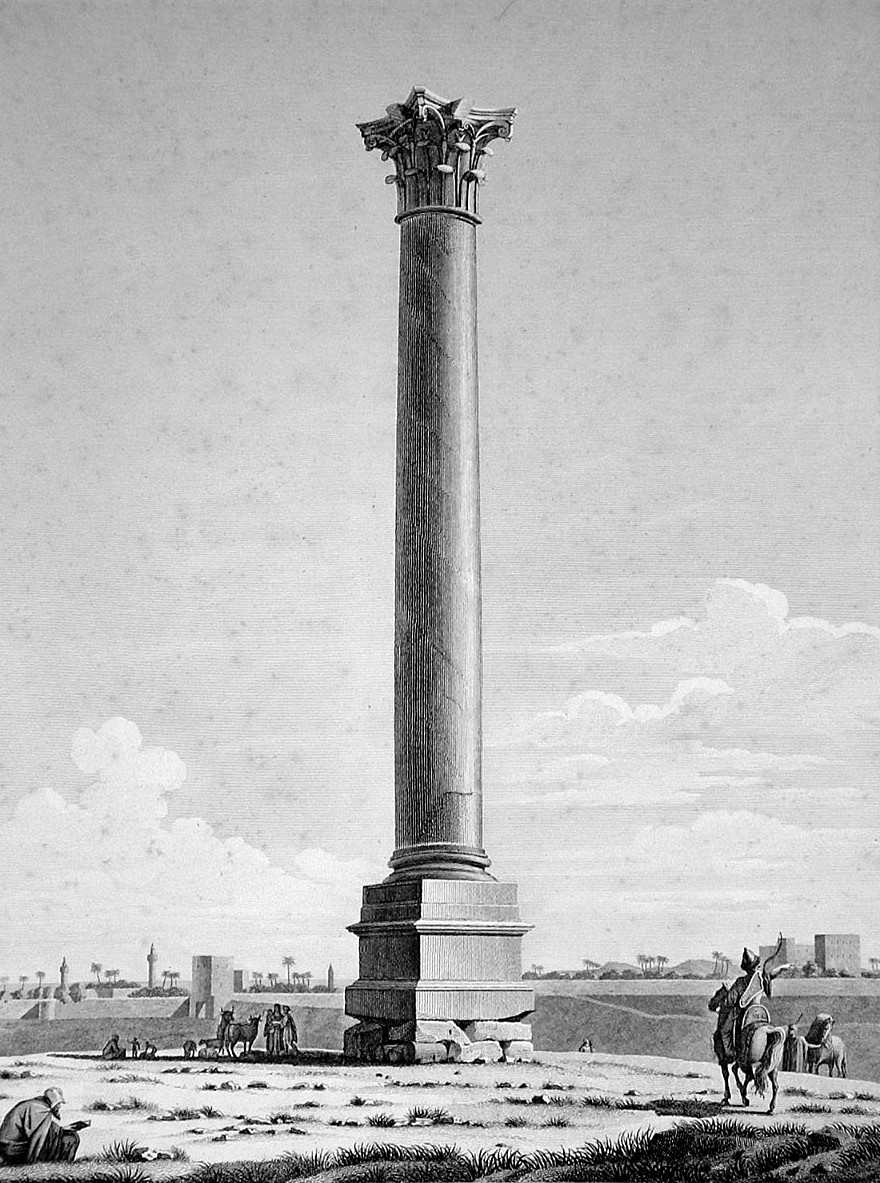
An old view of the pillar of the mast, likely the site of the church built to preserve the bodies of the prophets John the Baptist and Elisha.

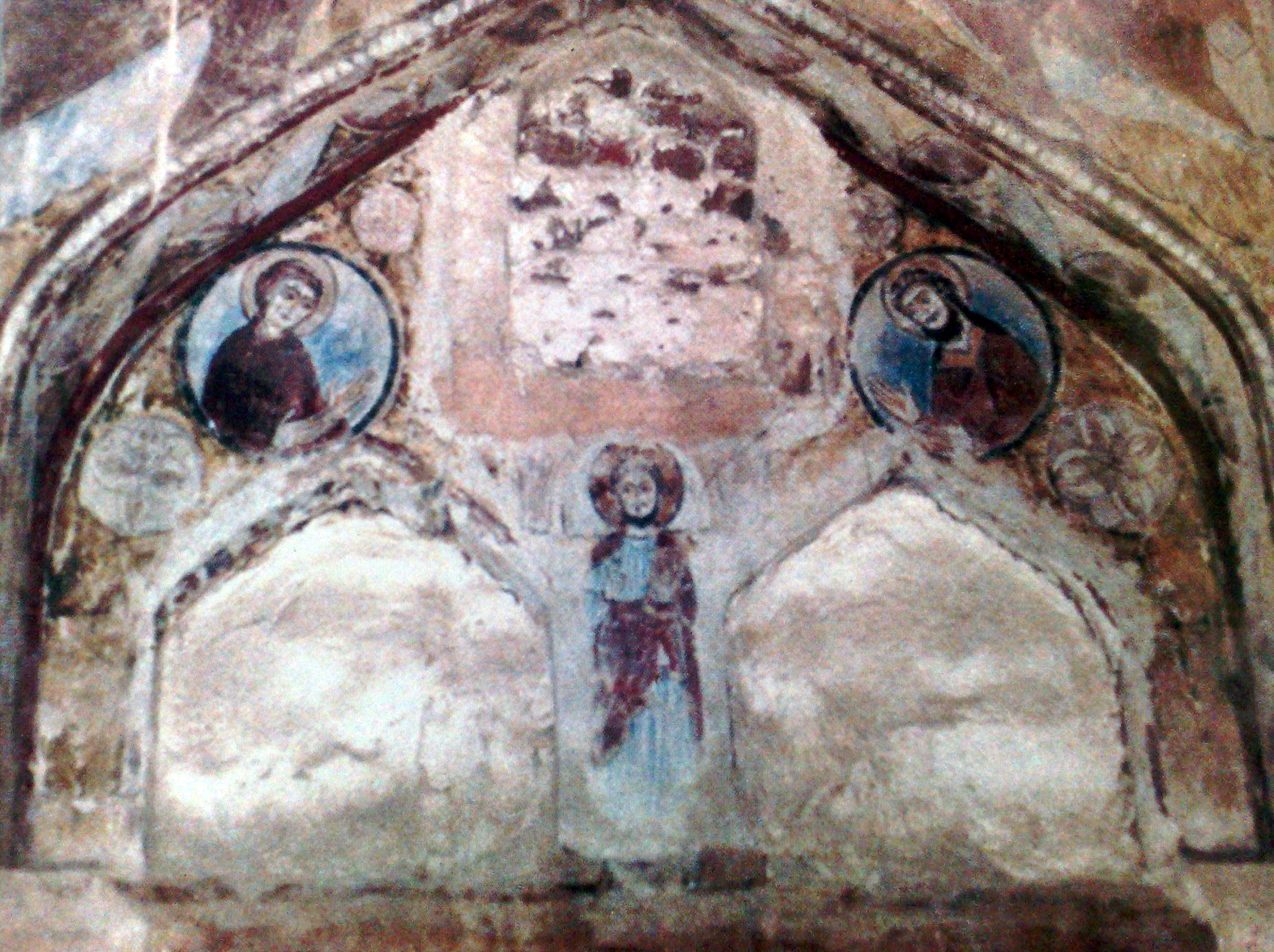
The Icon of Intercession, with Christ in the center, John the Baptist in the upper right and the Virgin Mary in the upper left, is located in the Temple of John the Baptist in the church of Anba Makar.

In April 1976, during Holy Tuesday, Pope Shenouda III visited the Monastery of Saint Macarius. Father Matta El-Meskeen informed him of the discovery of a burial site traditionally believed to contain the relics of Prophets John the Baptist and Elisha. Father Matta invited the Pope to stay an additional day to personally transfer the relics to a new reliquary, but the Pope declined. He questioned why the discovery had not yet been made public, to which Father Matta responded that there was insufficient evidence to conclusively attribute the relics to the prophets. The Pope replied, "There is also no evidence to deny it!" He suggested assigning Deacon Nabeh Kamel Dawood, a historian, to study the matter using manuscripts from the Patriarchate, despite the wealth of manuscripts housed within the monastery itself.

The discovery was eventually announced in the press on November 13, 1978, without the monastery's direct involvement.

According to Coptic Orthodox tradition, the relics of John the Baptist and Elisha were initially transferred from Palestine to Alexandria. Pope Athanasius the Apostolic safeguarded them in a garden, intending to build a proper church, but he died before doing so. His successor, Pope Theophilus I, established a church on the site of the former Serapeum temple in Alexandria. The Coptic Church commemorates the unveiling of their relics annually on the 2nd of Baouna in the Coptic calendar.

In 451 AD, Bishop Macar died, and his body was interred alongside those of John the Baptist and Elisha. This was based on a vision experienced by a mute individual, who described seeing the spirits of the prophets embracing Bishop Macar's soul. Consequently, the Coptic Church honors his memory on the 27th of Babah annually.

Later, during the tenure of Pope Michael I in 907 AD, Bishop Macar's relics were transferred to the Monastery of Saint Macarius, along with those of the prophets. This transfer followed the cessation of services at the Church of John the Baptist in Alexandria for unknown reasons.

The northern altar in the Church of Saint Macarius is dedicated to John the Baptist. This placement, diverging from typical Coptic liturgical customs, underscores the importance of John the Baptist's relics. Traditionally, baptistries or icons dedicated to John the Baptist are located south of the main altar, yet in this case, the relics prompted a notable liturgical adjustment.

=== Discovery of the Relics of John the Baptist and Elisha ===
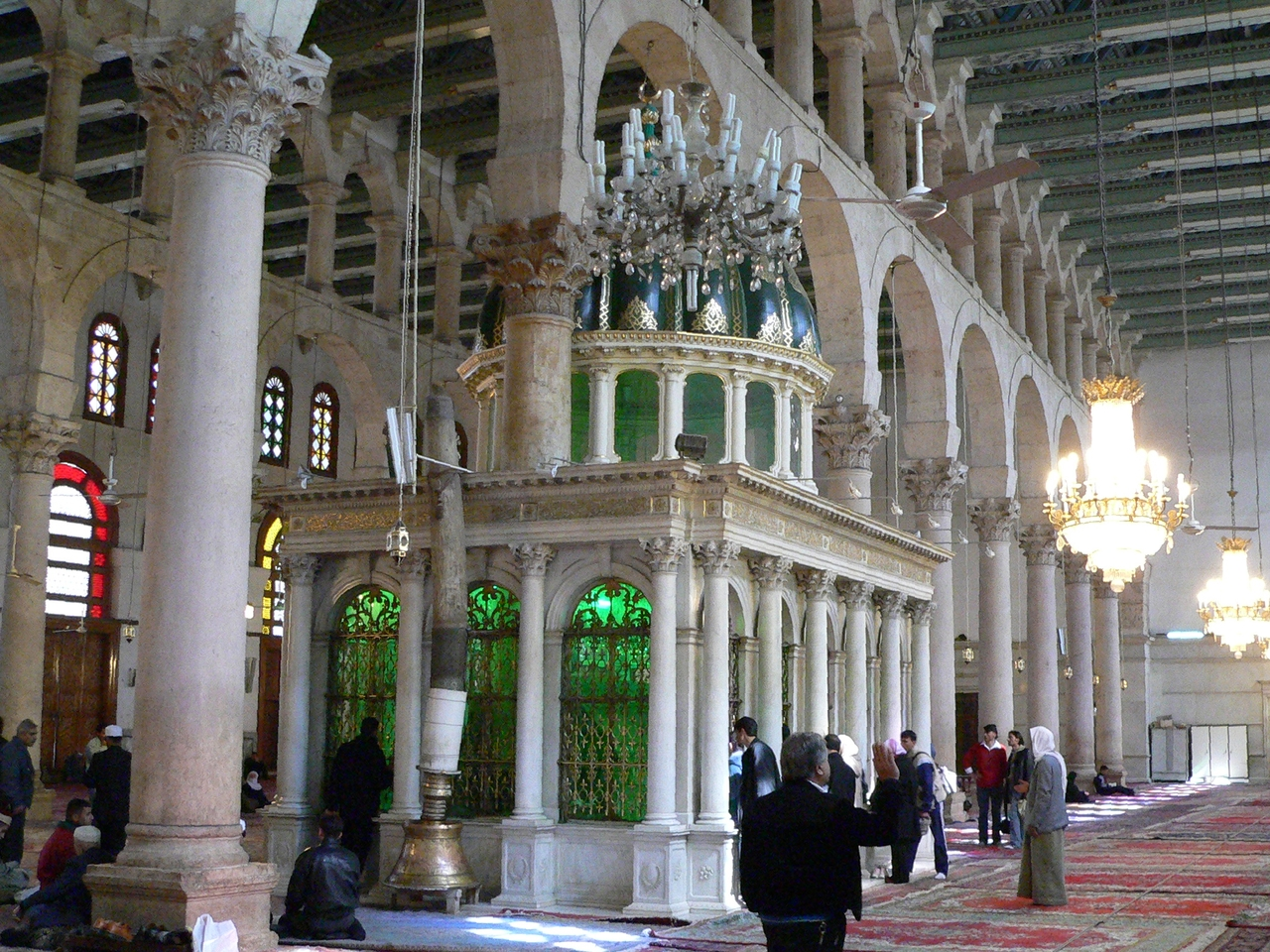
The tomb of Prophet Yahya (John the Baptist) at the Great Umayyad Mosque in Damascus.

On July 28, 2010, an announcement was made regarding the discovery of relics believed to belong to John the Baptist on St. Ivan Island, located in the Black Sea near the town of Sozopol, Bulgaria. The relics were found beneath the altar of a 5th-century church on the island after three years of excavation.

In Islam, John the Baptist is known as Prophet Yahya ibn Zakariya. One of the most notable sites associated with him is the Umayyad Mosque in Damascus, Syria, which contains a shrine believed to house the head of Prophet Yahya. According to tradition, during the mosque's construction, a subterranean chamber was discovered containing a box with an intact head, said to belong to Yahya. The Umayyad Caliph Al-Walid ibn Abd al-Malik ordered that the box remain in place, and a shrine was built above it.

Other Sites Associated with Prophet Yahya:

1. Sidon, Lebanon: Some sources claim that Prophet Yahya’s actual tomb is located here.
2. Wadi Al-Kharrar, Jordan: Another site believed to house his relics.
3. Sebastia, Palestine: It is said that a cave there contains his tomb.
4. Umayyad Mosque in Aleppo, Syria: This mosque also houses a shrine believed to contain either the head or another relic of Prophet Yahya, along with a marble box said to hold a relic of his father, Prophet Zakariya.

As for Elisha, known in Islam as Prophet Al-Yasaʿ, his relics are traditionally believed to rest in a shrine located in Al-Awamiyah, Qatif Province, Saudi Arabia. This site is regarded as one of the key locations associated with him, although historical documentation supporting this claim is limited.

These discoveries and associated traditions reflect of preserving religious heritage and the overlap of historical narratives within Christianity and Islam. While some of these claims are rooted in longstanding religious traditions, they remain subjects of ongoing archaeological and historical investigation.

== Former abbot ==
As of 2013, Anba Epiphanius, who had been a member of the brotherhood since 1984, was appointed as the bishop and abbot of the Monastery of St. Macarius. He was 64 years old when he died in 2018.

The Coptic Church published a statement to say that Pope Tawadros “mourned in Anba Epiphanius a true monk whose life was steeped in meekness and humbleness; also a scholar who possessed a wealth of knowledge that fruited research and publications in various branches of ecclesiastical studies. The Pope prayed for peace for his soul, and comfort for the St Macarius monk assembly as well as all who loved the late Abbot [...] He was simple in his clothes, his house and his food. Bishop Epiphanius was very simple and he preferred to sit in the last rows,".

Pope Tawadros would also consult the abbot due to his extensive knowledge and authorship. The abbot had attended 20 conferences in five years with the Pope's blessing.

Anba Epiphanius was an ardent follower of Matthew the Poor and it is believed that this led to severe tension within his monastery particularly where the former monk and suspect in the abbot's killing, Wael Saad Tawadros, was concerned.

Forty days after his death, a retreat house was inaugurated by Pope Tawadros II himself, bearing the name of "Anba Epiphanius Retreat House", which welcomes foreign pilgrims from all around the world.

== Popes from the Monastery of St. Macarius ==
This table is a listing of the Popes of the Coptic Orthodox Church that were from the Monastery of St. Macarius or that spent long periods in it.

- Pope Cyril of Alexandria (412–444)
- Pope John I (496-505)
- Pope John III (680-689)
- Pope Isaac (690-692)
- Pope Cosmas I (729-730)
- Pope Michael I (743-767)
- Pope Mina I (767-776)
- Pope John IV (777-799)
- Pope Mark II (799-819)
- Pope James (819-830)
- Pope Simeon II (830)
- Pope Joseph I (831-849)
- Pope Cosmas II (851-858)
- Pope Shenouda I (859-880)
- Pope Michael III (880-907)
- Pope Gabriel I (910-920)
- Pope Macarius I (932-952)
- Pope Theophanes (952-956)
- Pope Mina II (956-974)
- Pope Philotheos (979-1003)
- Pope Shenouda II (1032-1046)
- Pope Cyril II (1078–1092)
- Pope Michael IV (1092-1102)
- Pope Macarius II (1102-1128)
- Pope Michael V (1145-1146)
- Pope Peter V (1340-1348)
- Pope Mark V (1603-1619)
- Pope Matthew III (1631-1646)
- Pope Demetrius II (1861-1870)

== Other monasteries of the Desert of Scetis ==
- The Monastery of Saint Pishoy
- The Syrian Monastery
- The Paromeos Monastery

== Gallery ==
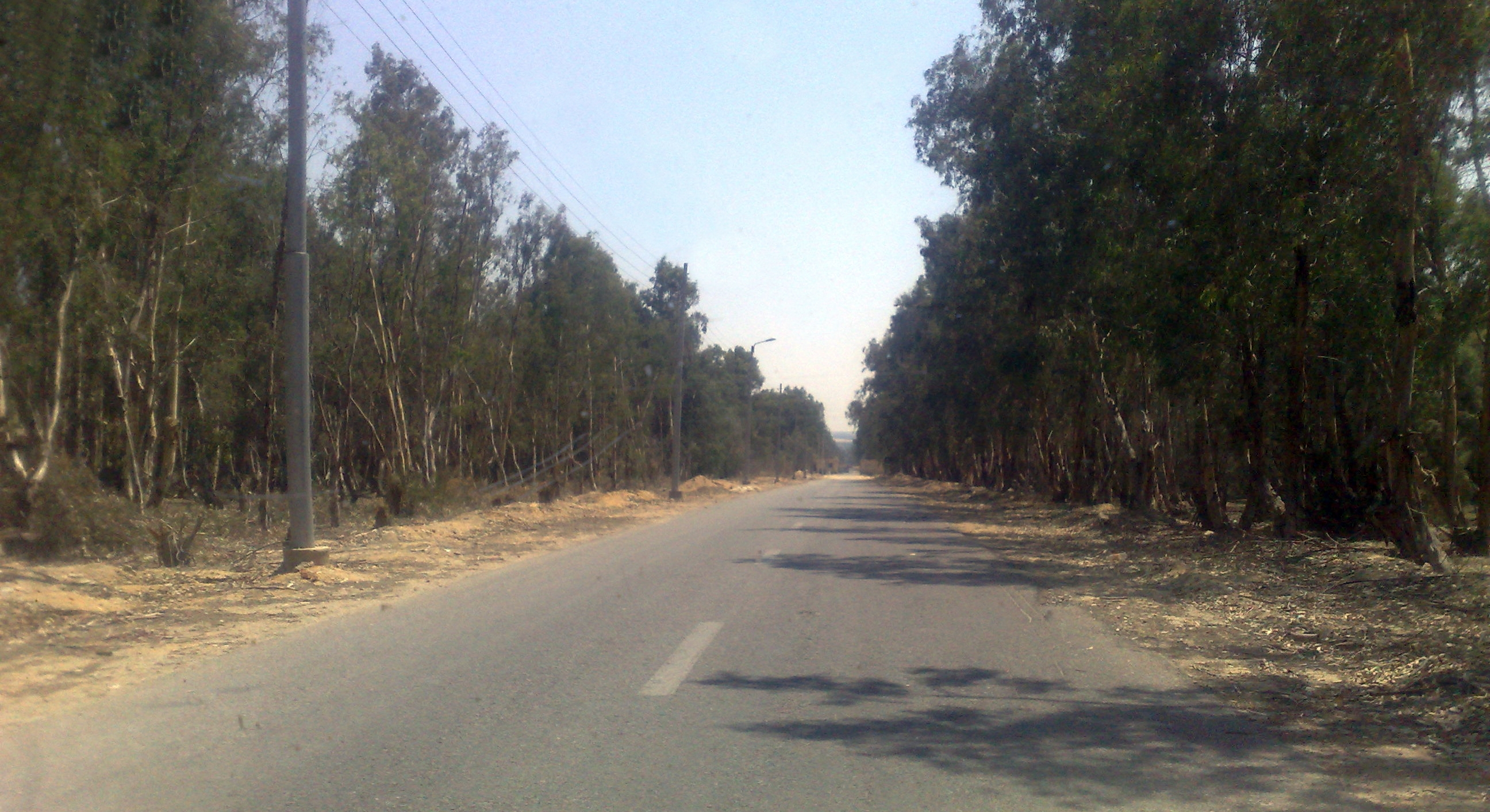
The road between Sadat City and the monastery is 2.8 kilometers long until the monastery's gate to its farm, and a total of 5 kilometers to the monastery building itself, crossing the Cairo-Alexandria Desert Road.

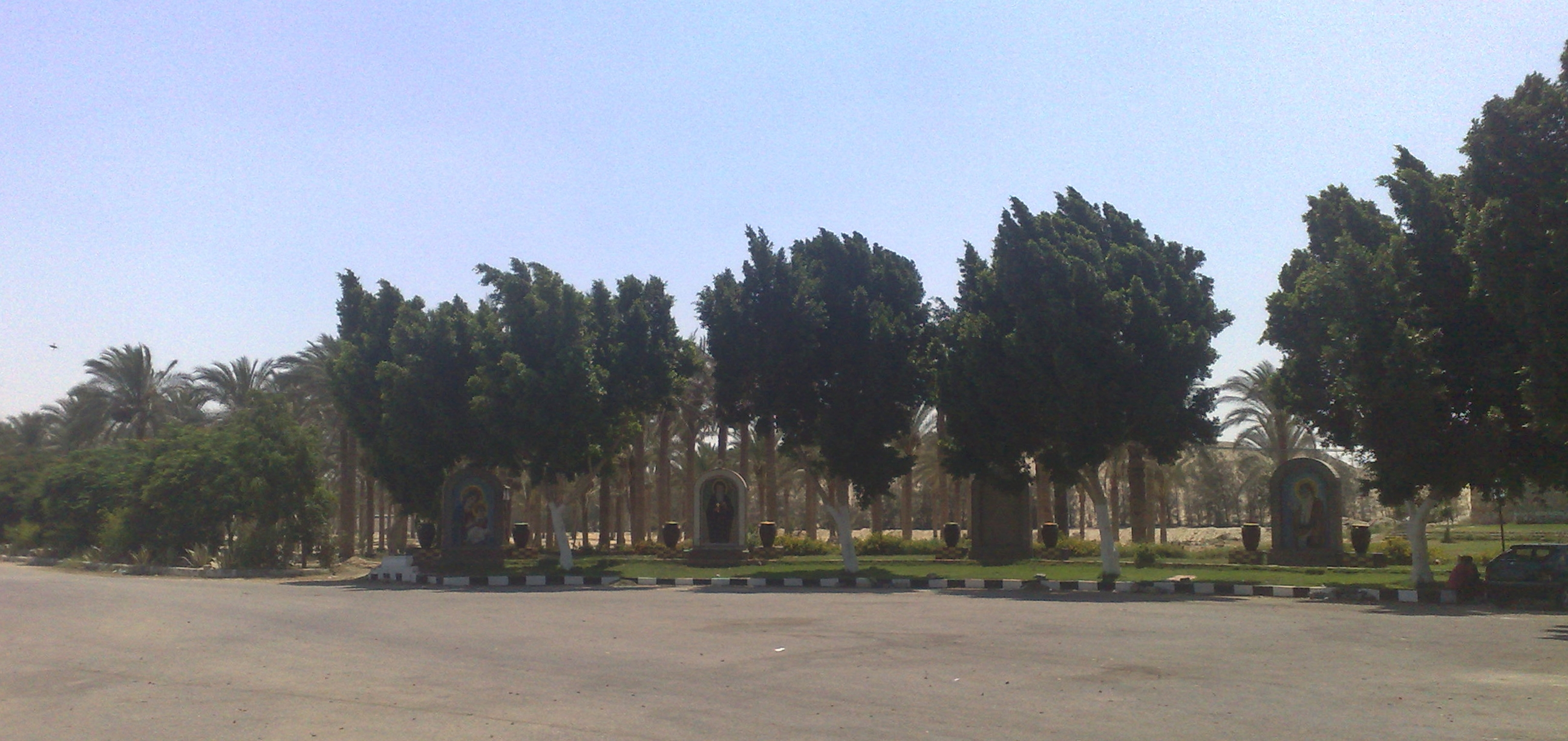
The entrance to the first gate leading to the farms surrounding the monastery, and then the monastery itself after 2.2 kilometers.

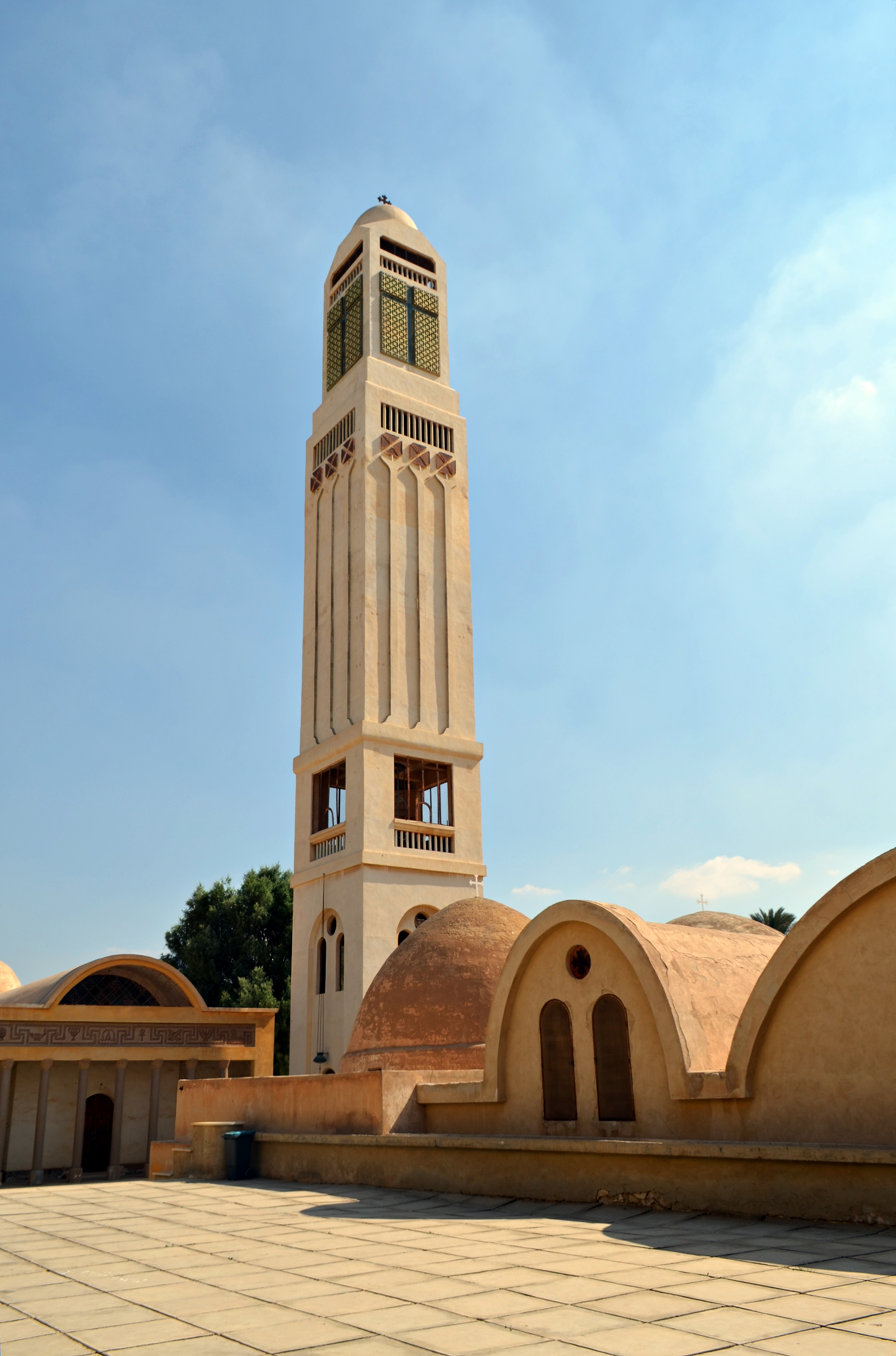
The monastery's lone lighthouse with the domes of the Anba Makar church next to it.

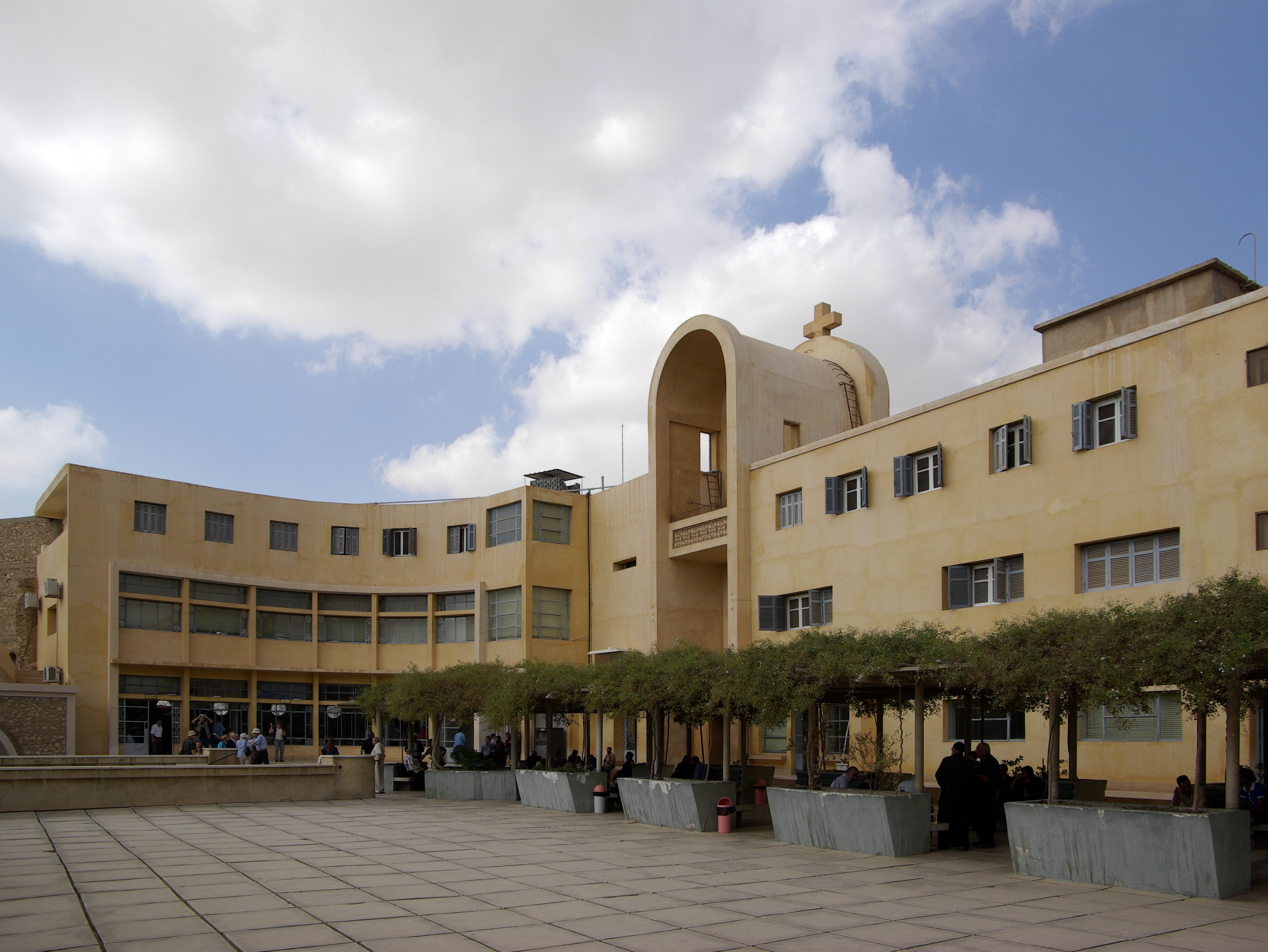
The monastery's new guesthouse.

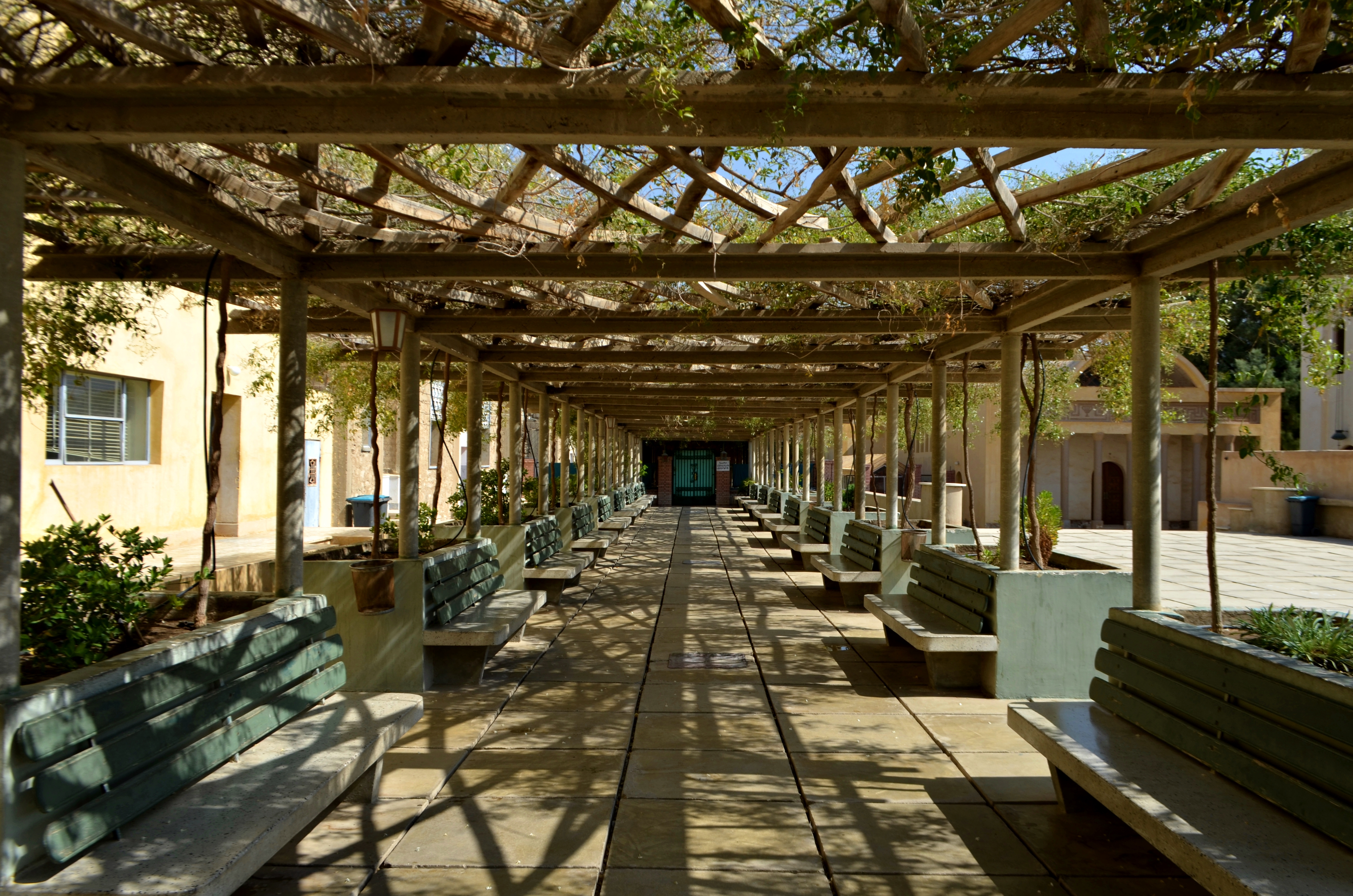
A place to rest and wait for visitors.

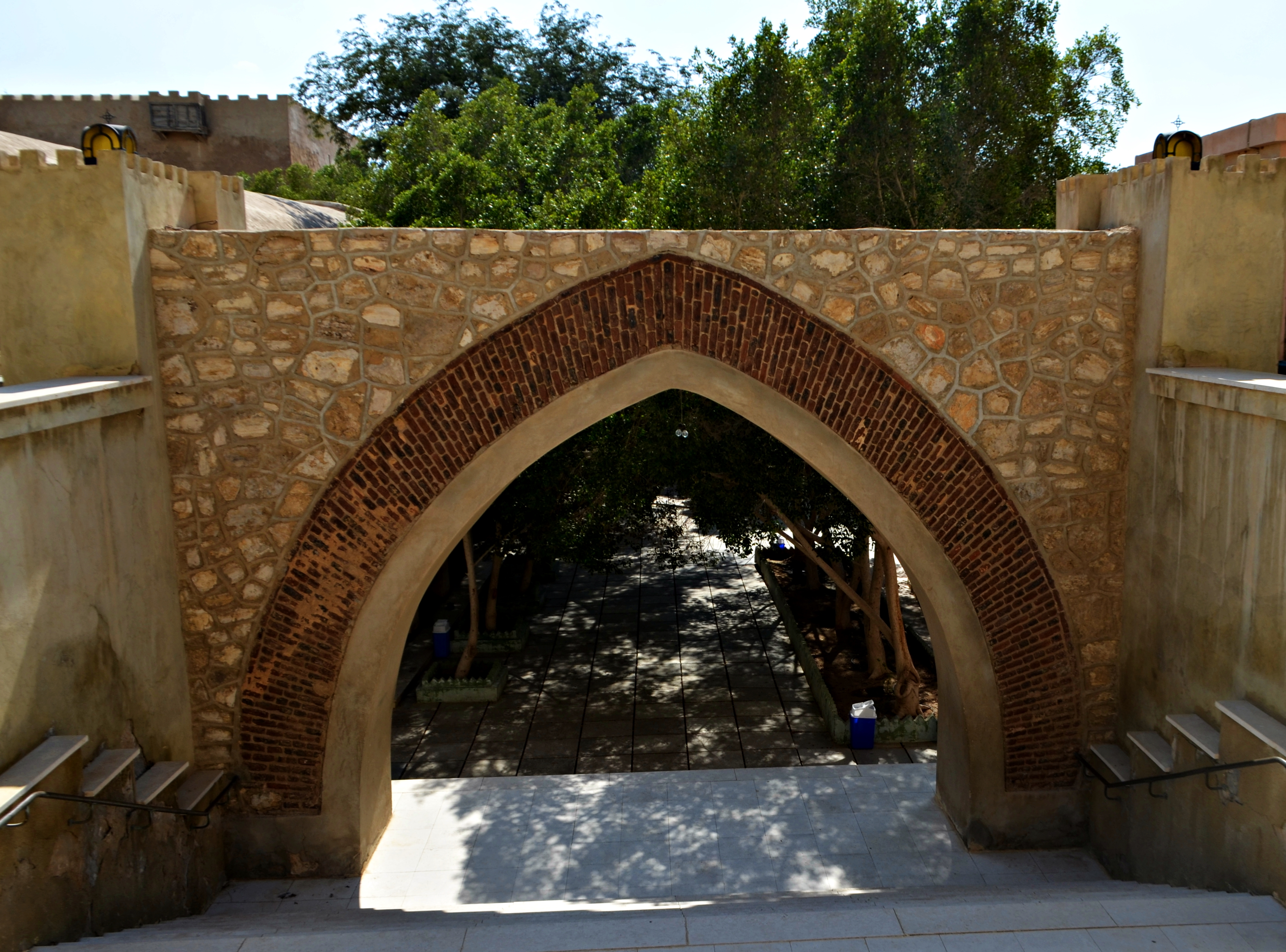
The ancient archaeological gate leading to the three monastery churches (without the fortress).

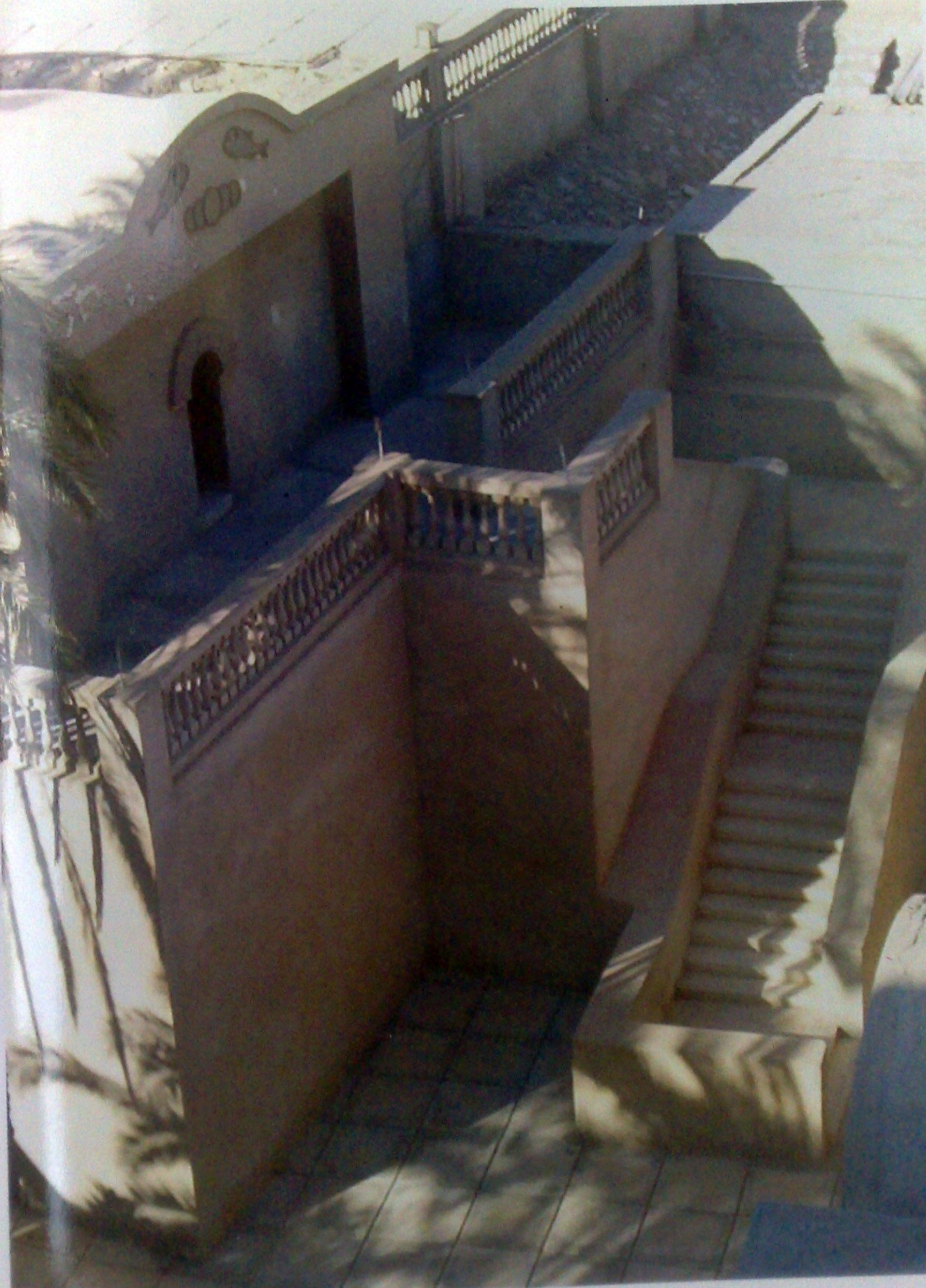
The old monks' table next to the Church of the Martyr Abascheron Al-Qalini.

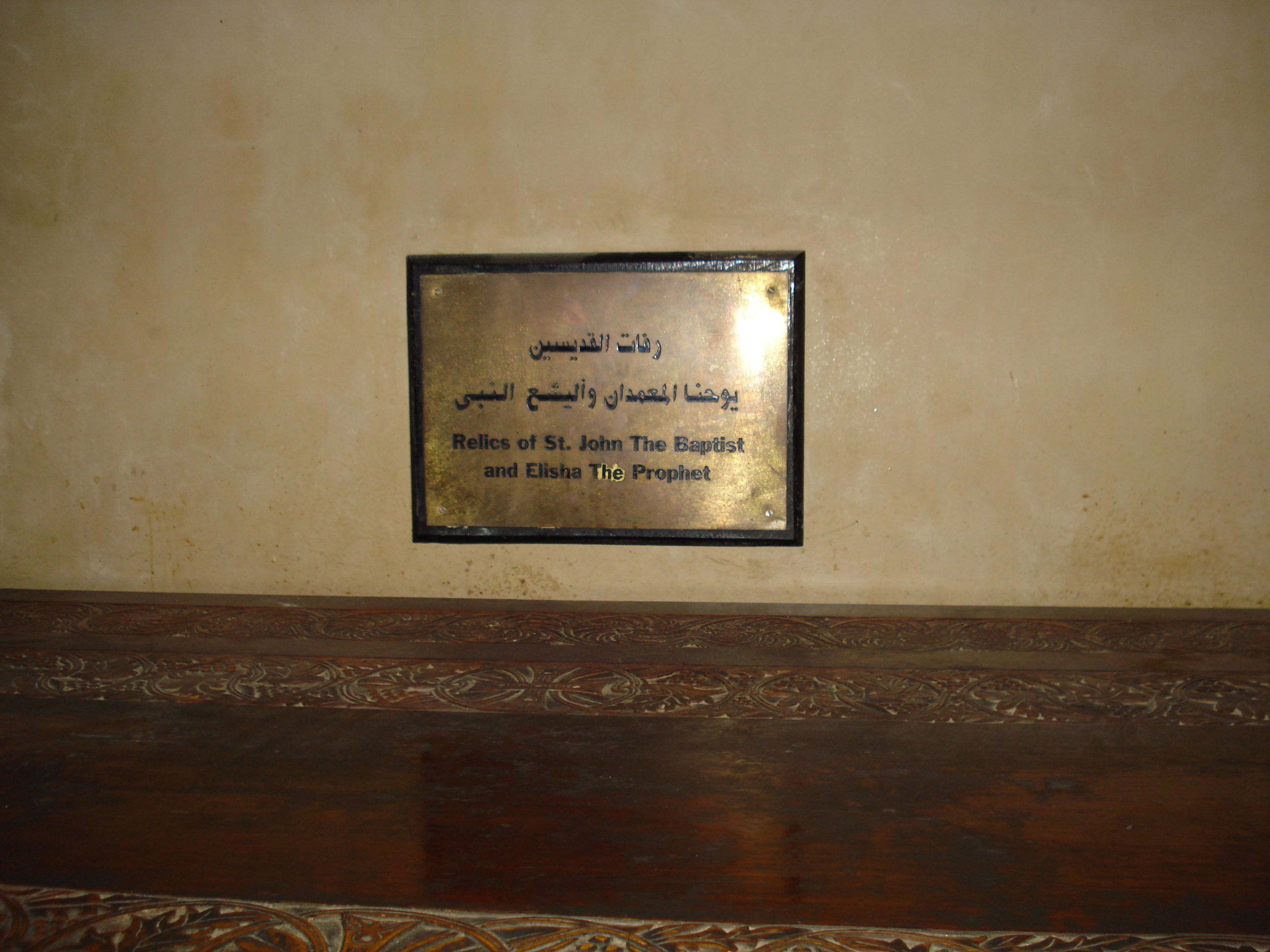
A sign indicating where the remains of the prophets John the Baptist and Elisha the Prophet are kept just below.

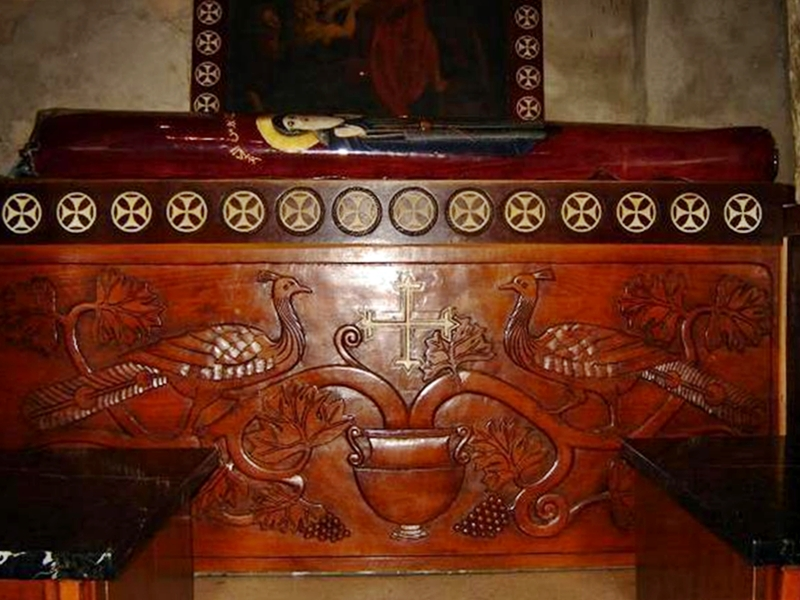
The wooden compartment where the relics of the nine patriarchs are kept, below the pipes where the three shrines are kept.

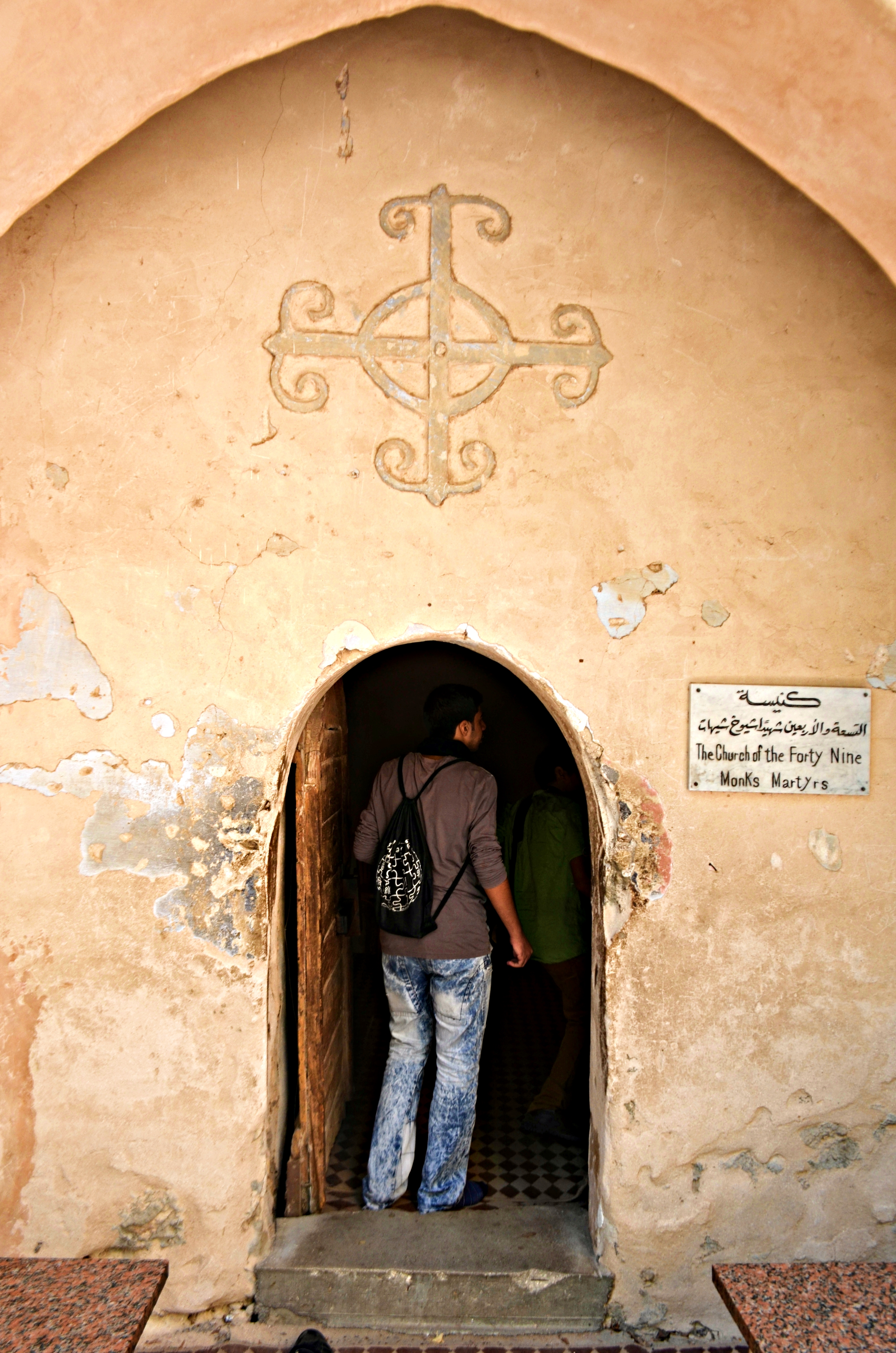
The entrance to the Church of the 49 Martyrs.

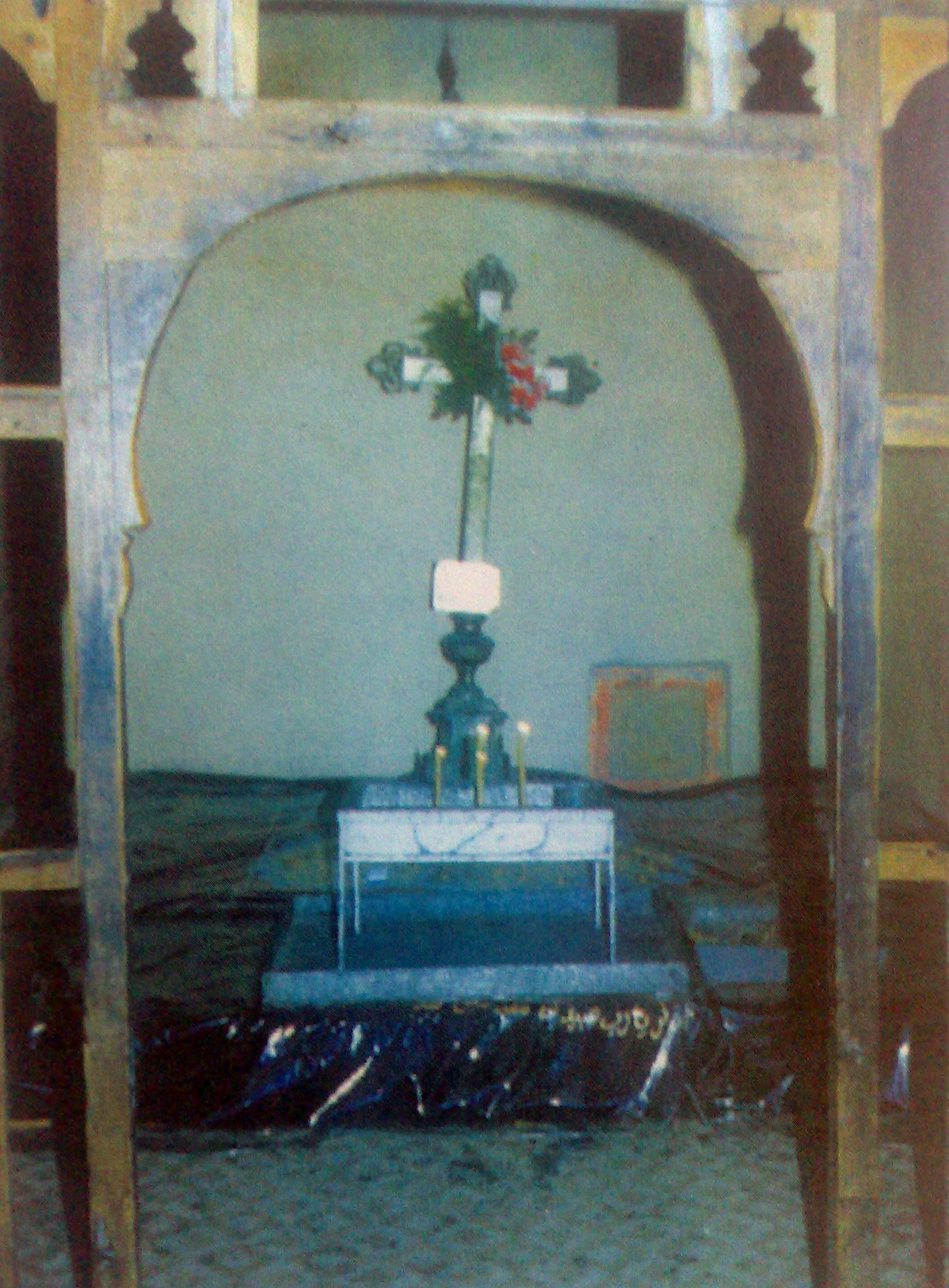
The tomb of the forty-nine sheikhs in the Church of the Sheikhs, who were killed by the Berbers in 444.

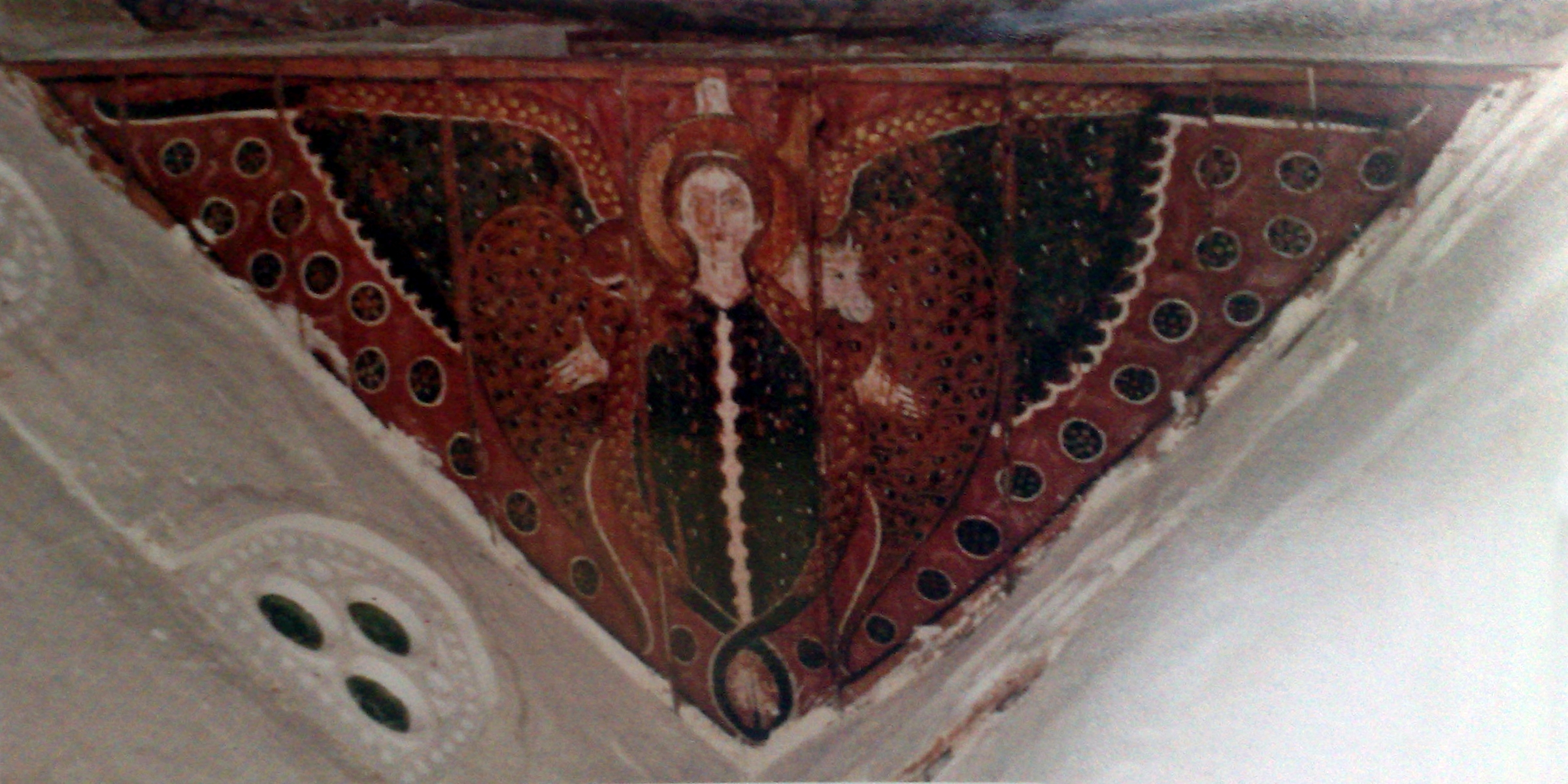
The Cherubim Icon, located in the northern corner of the Temple of Bishop Benjamin at the base of the dome in the Church of Bishop Makar.

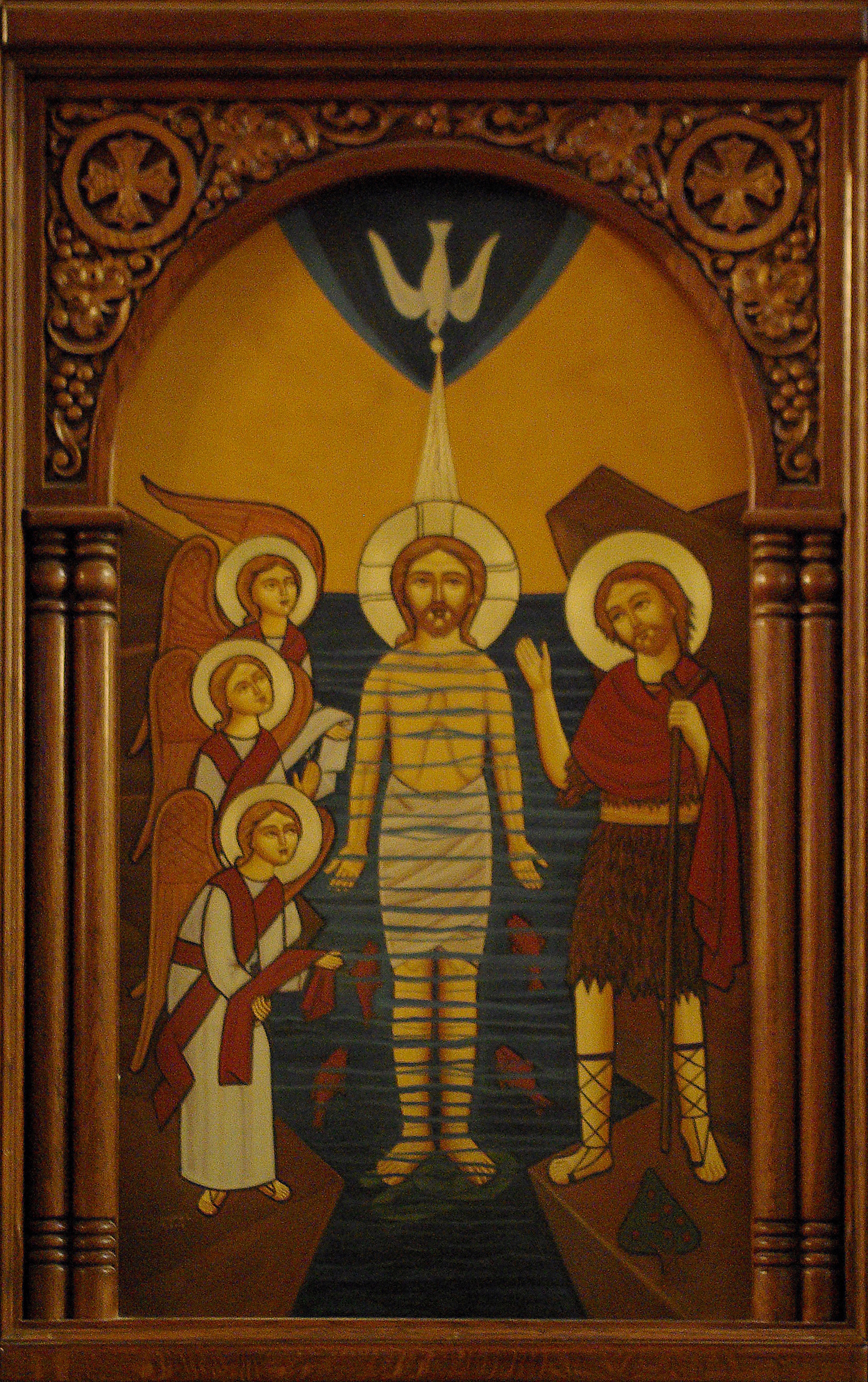
A Coptic icon depicting Jesus Christ.

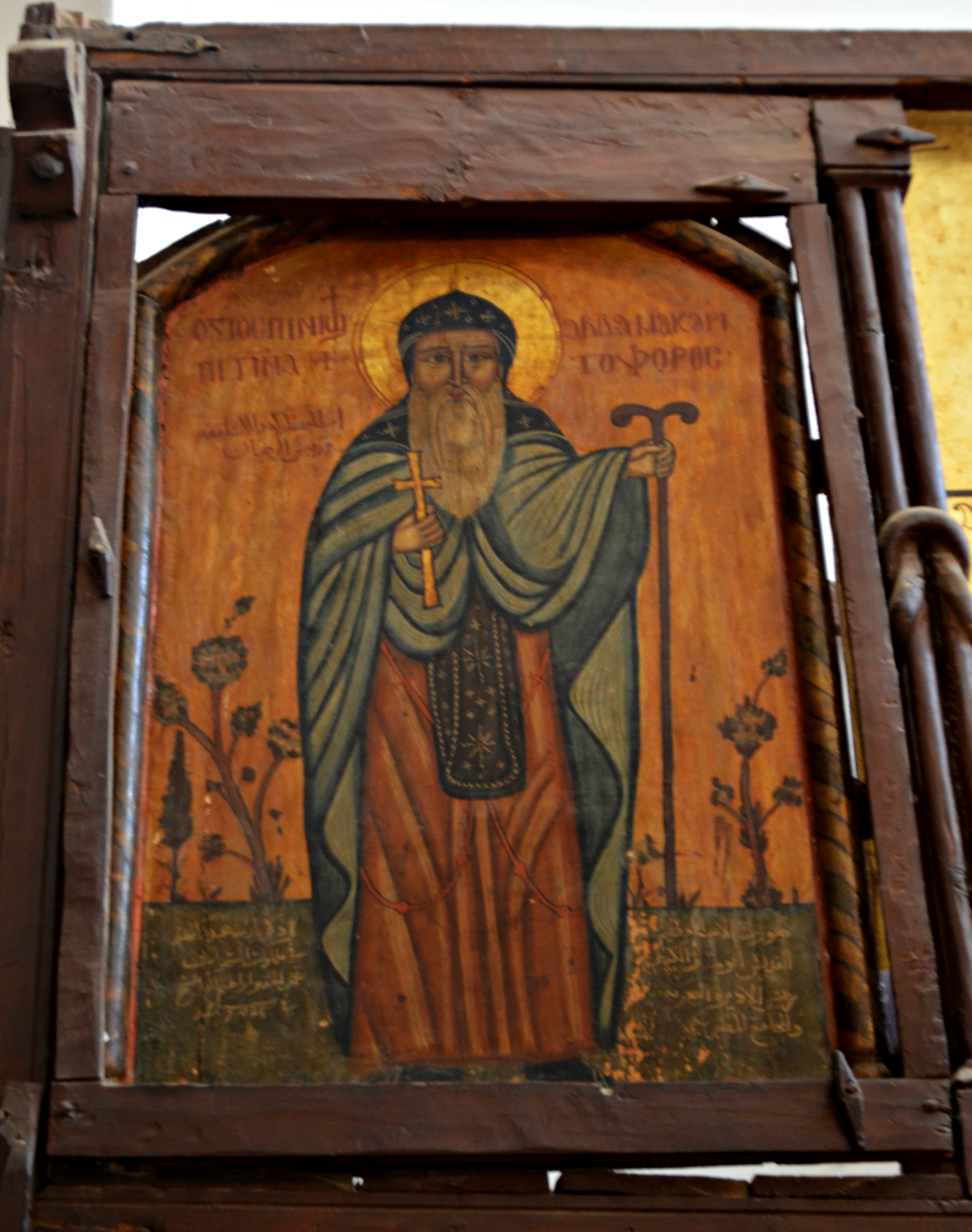
An antique icon of Anba Makar the Great.

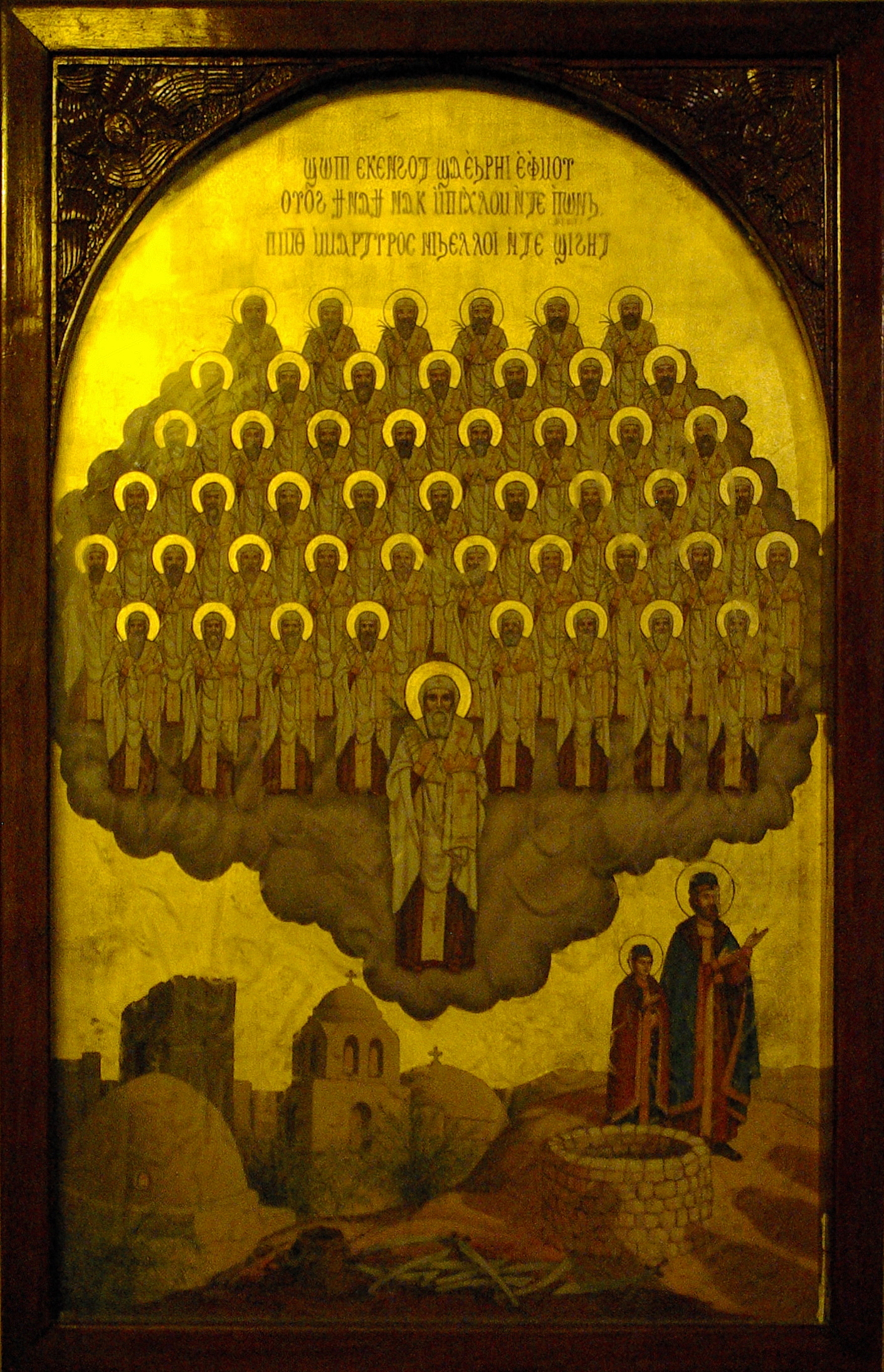
An icon depicting the forty-nine sheikhs killed by the Berbers in 444.

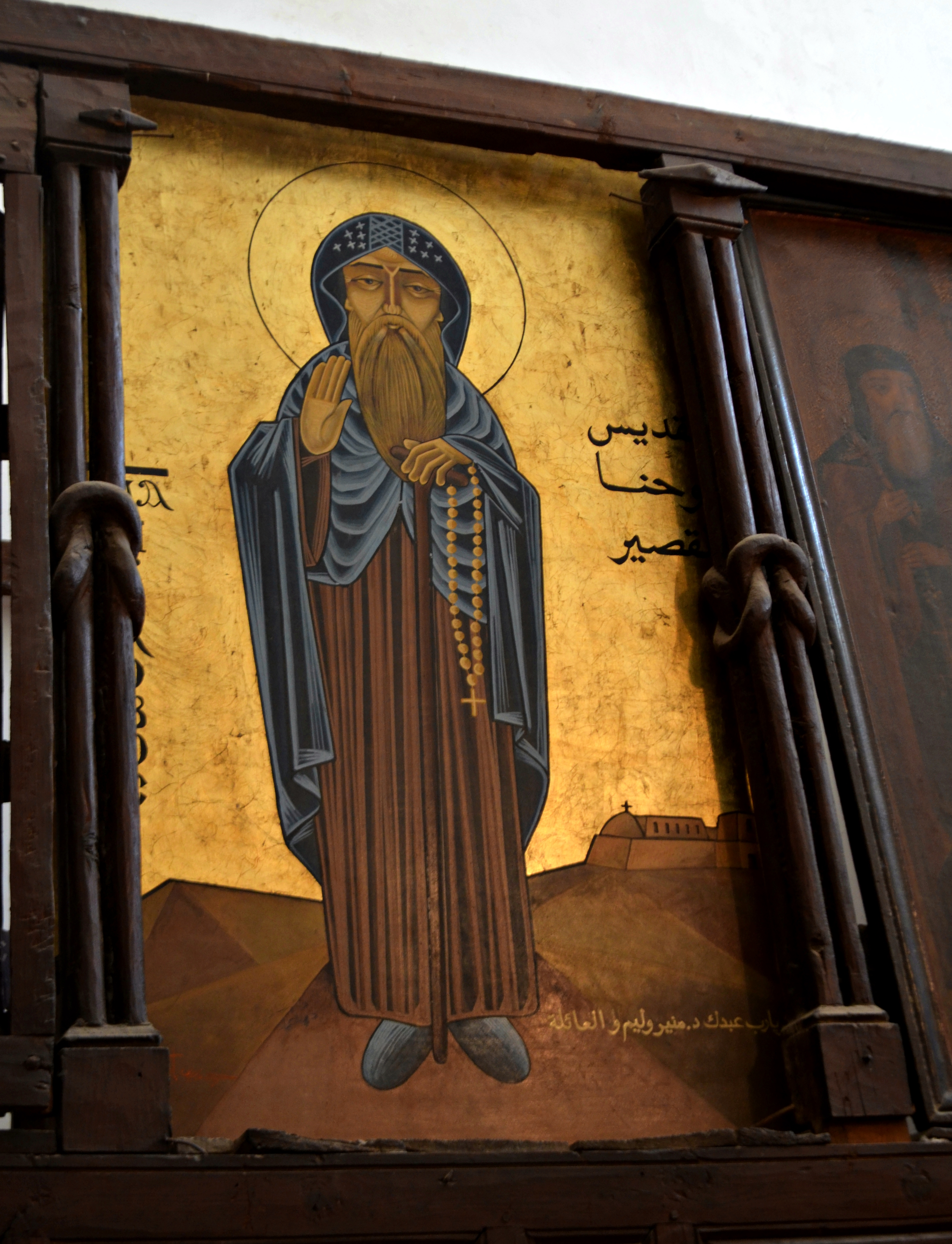
Coptic icon of St. John the Short.

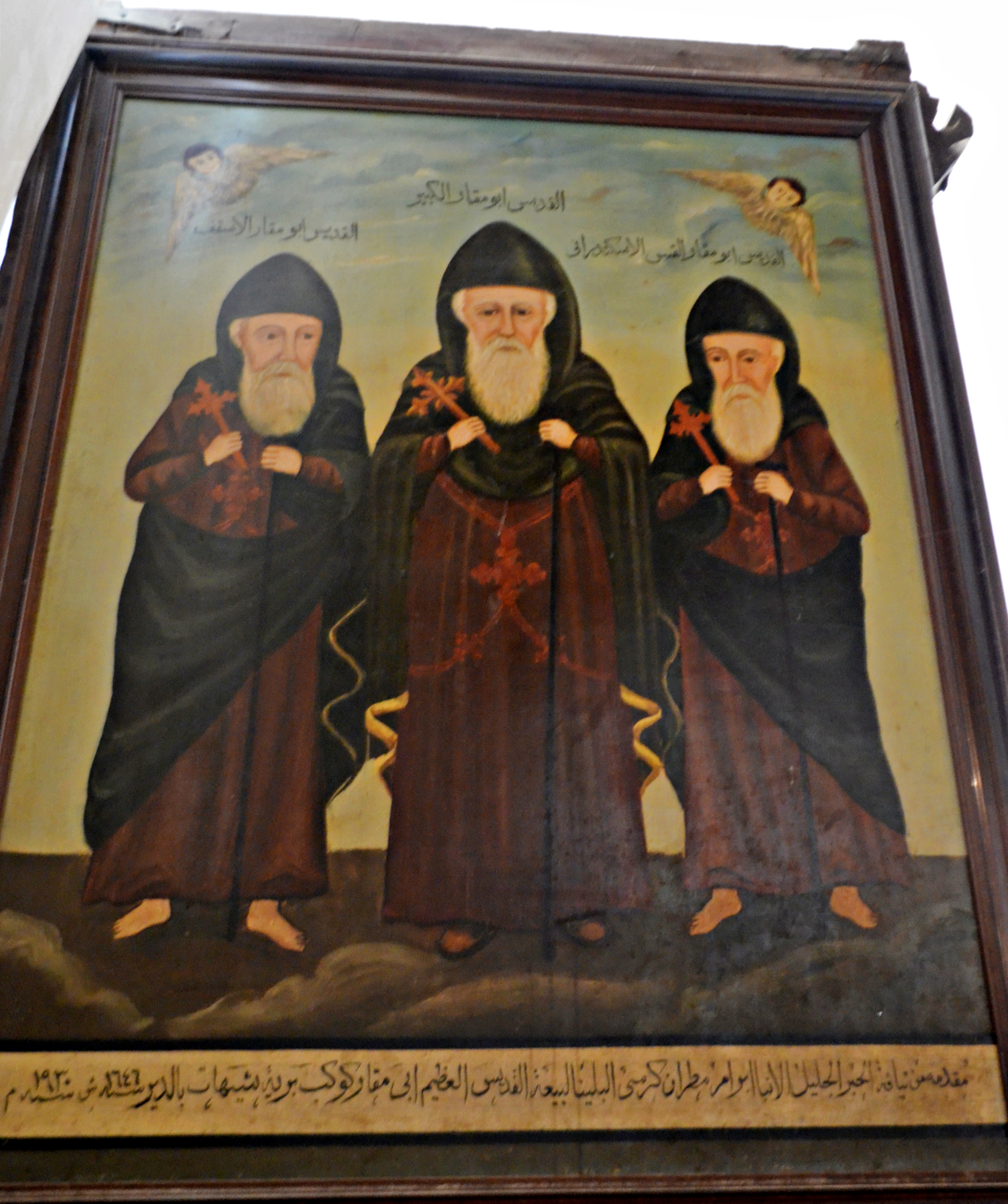
A monumental icon of the three saints.

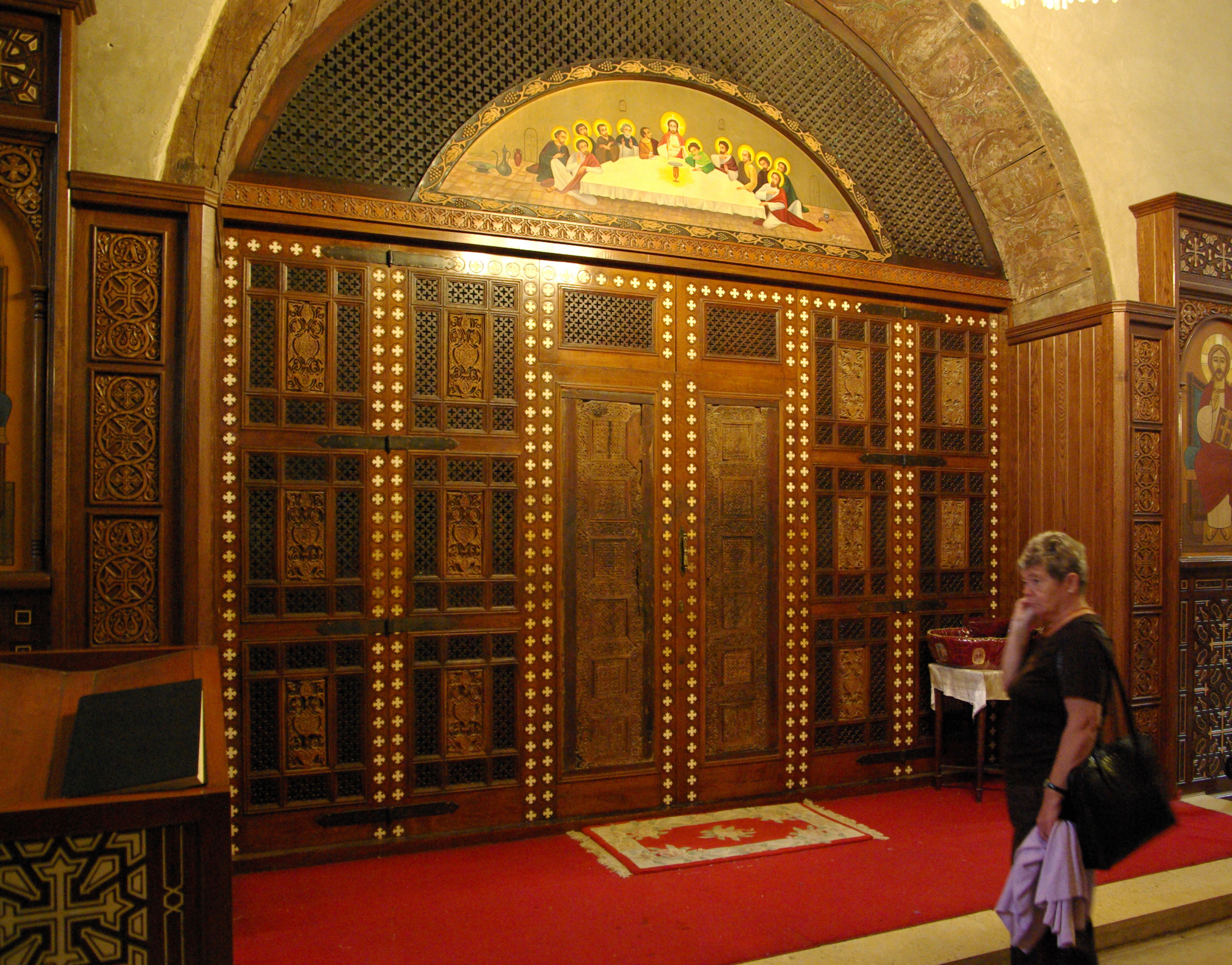
The veil of Anba Benjamin's temple at Anba Makar Church.

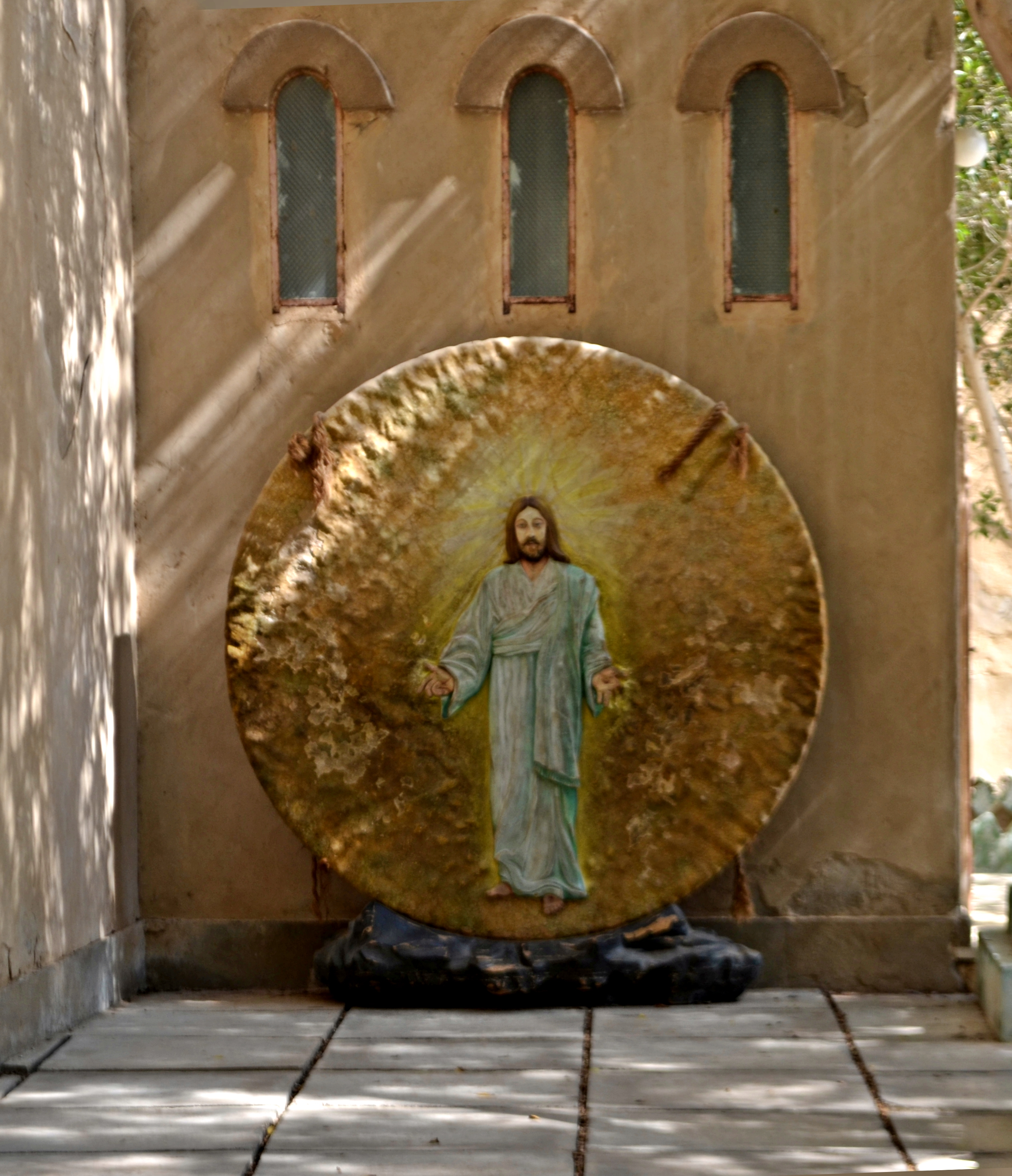
A modern sculpture of Jesus.

== See also ==
- Macarius of Egypt
- Coptic Orthodox Church
- Desert Fathers
- Wadi El Natrun
- Saint Bashnouna
- Father Matta El Meskeen
