= List of Coptic saints =

List of individuals canonized as saints within the Coptic Orthodox Church

Early church historians, writers, and fathers testified to the numerous Copt martyrs. Tertullian, a 3rd-century North African lawyer, wrote, "If the martyrs of the whole world were put on one arm of the balance and the martyrs of Egypt on the other, the balance will tilt in favor of the Copts."

The following is a list of saints commemorated by the Coptic Orthodox Church of Alexandria. The majority of saints are from Egypt, with the majority venerated in all of Christianity.

== Alphabetical list of Christian Saints in the Coptic Orthodox Church of Alexandria ==
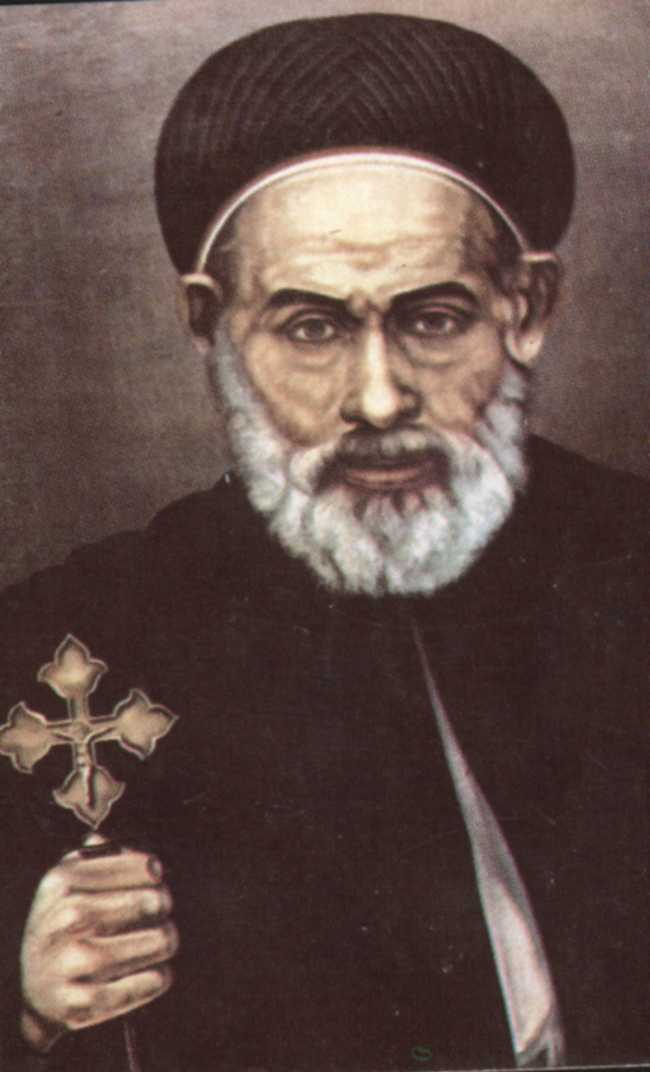
St. Abraham ⲁⲃⲃⲁ ⲁⲃⲣⲁⲁⲙ

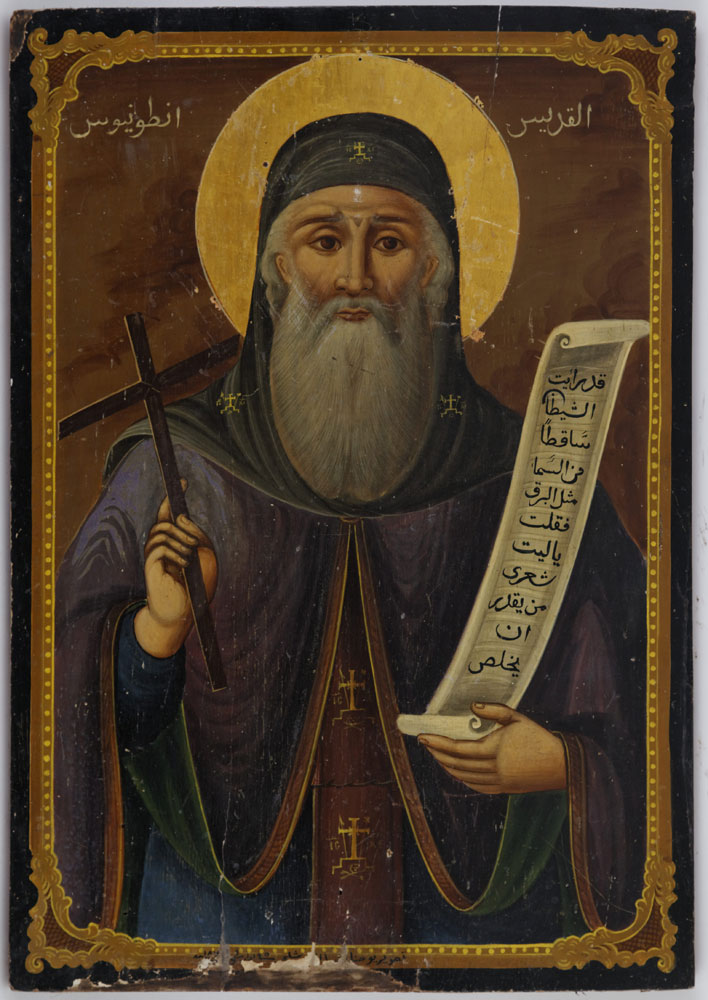
St. Anthony the Great ⲁⲃⲃⲁ ⲁⲛⲧⲱⲛⲓⲟⲥ

- Aaron ⲁⲁⲣⲟⲛ, the high priest, and brother of Moses ⲙⲱⲩⲥⲏⲥ
- Ababius, monk of Scetes
- Abadiu, bishop and martyr of Ansena
- Abakir ⲁⲡⲁ ⲕⲩⲣ, John, the 3 Virgins and their Mother, martyrs from Alexandria
- Abakragoun ⲁⲡⲁ ⲕⲣⲁⲅⲱⲛ, martyr
- Abāmūn of Tarnūt, martyr
- Abāmūn of Tukh ⲁⲡⲁ ⲁⲙⲟⲩⲛ, martyr
- Abanoub ⲁⲡⲁ ⲁⲛⲟⲩⲃ, the child martyr
- Abanoub ⲁⲡⲁ ⲁⲛⲟⲩⲃ, confessor
- Abanoub ⲁⲡⲁ ⲁⲛⲟⲩⲃ of The Golden Fan
- Abaskhayroun ⲁⲡⲁ ⲥⲭⲩⲣⲟⲛ, the soldier, martyr from Qallin
- Abdel Messih El-Habashi Eritrean monk of the Paromeos Monastery
- Abdel Messih El-Makari, 20th-century monk of the Monastery of St. Marcarius
- Abib and Apollo, 4th-century monks from Akhmim
- Abraam, abbot of El-Muharraq Monastery, bishop of Fayoum and Giza, noted for his devotion to the poor
- Abraam Anba Samuel ⲁⲃⲣⲁⲁⲙ ⲁⲡⲁ ⲥⲁⲙⲟⲩⲏⲗ, abbot of the Monastery of St. Thomas the Anchorite
- Abraam and George ⲁⲃⲣⲁⲁⲙ ⲛⲉⲙ ⲅⲉⲱⲣⲅⲓⲟⲥ, 7th-century monks of the Monastery of St. Marcarius
- Abraham ⲁⲃⲣⲁⲁⲙ, 4th-century monk and hermit of Minuf
- Abraham, 4th-century monk of Scetes
- Abraham, ⲁⲃⲣⲁⲁⲙ 6th-century abbot of the Monastery of St. Phoibammon, and 14th bishop of Hermonthis
- Abraham of Farshut, 6th-century abbot
- Abraham, the 62nd Pope of Alexandria
- Abraham, the poor, the simple, monk
- Abraham, the prophet
- Abratacus (feast day April 16)
- Acacius, bishop of Jerusalem
- Acacius, patriarch of Constantinople
- Achillas, 4th–5th century monk
- Achillas, the 18th Pope of Alexandria
- Aesculapius and Dioscorus, 4th-century ascetes and martyrs of Akhmim
- Agabus, one of the seventy disciples
- Agatho,. ⲡⲁⲡⲁ ⲁⲅⲁⲑⲟⲥ the 39th Pope of Alexandria
- Agathon, Peter, John, Amun, Amuna & their mother Rebecca, 4th-century martyrs from Qus
- Agathon, the stylite ⲁⲅⲁⲑⲟⲛ ⲡⲓⲥⲧⲩⲗⲗⲁⲧⲓⲥ spent ten years in Scetes and fifty years in solitude on a pillar
- Agrippinus, the 10th Pope of Alexandria
- Alexander, bishop of Jerusalem
- Alexander I, the 19th Pope of Alexandria
- Alexander II, the 43rd Pope of Alexandria
- Ambrose of Alexandria, theologian and confessor
- Ammonius, bishop of Esna, martyr
- Ammonius, founder of the Monastery of the Martyrs
- Ammonius of Kellia, disciple of St. Pambo ⲁⲡⲁ ⲡⲁⲙⲃⲱ of Scetes
- Amos, one of the minor twelve minor prophets
- Amun,ⲁⲡⲁ ⲁⲙⲟⲩⲛ anchorite and bishop from Scetes
- Anna Simone (Anasimon), the anchoress queen
- Anastasia, martyr
- Anastasia the Patrician
- Anastasius, the 36th Pope of Alexandria
- Andrew, the apostle and brother of St. Peter
- Andrianus, the martyr
- Andronicus, the 37th Pope of Alexandria
- Anianus, the 2nd Pope of Alexandria
- Anne (Hannah), the mother of the Theotokos
- Anthony the Great, ⲡⲓⲛⲓϣϯ ⲁⲡⲁ ⲁⲛⲧⲱⲛⲓⲟⲥ father of monasticism
- Apakir
- Apali, martyr and son of St. Justus and St. Theoclia
- Apollonia, virgin martyr
- Apollo of Bawit, native of Akhmim, founder of the Monastery of St. Apollo at Bawit
- Apollos
- Apraxios, native of Upper Egypt, became a monk at twenty and lived until seventy
- Archiledes
- Ari, priest of Shatanouf
- Arianus, Governor of Ansena who repented after martyring many Christians
- Aristobulus, one of the Seventy Apostles
- Arsenius, slave of St. Sousnyous
- Arsenius, tutor of Arcadius and Honorius, the sons of Emperor Theodosius the Great
- Athanasius, metropolitan of Beni Suef and El-Bahnasa
- Athanasius I, the Apostolic, the 20th Pope of Alexandria
- Athanasius II, the 28th Pope of Alexandria
- Athanasius III, the 76th Pope of Alexandria
- Athanasius and his sister Irene, martyrs
- Athenagoras, the Athenian, apologist, and philosopher
- Avghanistos, martyr and soldier of The Martyr St. Arianus The Governor of Ansena
- Avilius, the 3rd Pope of Alexandria
- Awgin, father of Monasticism in Mesopotamia

=== B ===
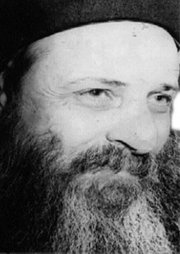
St. Bishoy Kamel

- Babnuda, the anchorite, martyr
- Bagoosh and his mother, martyrs
- Balamon, the anchorite
- Barbara and Juliana, martyrs
- Barsanuphius, monk, martyr during the Islamic occupation of Egypt
- Barsauma, the Father of Ascetism
- Barnabas, one of the seventy apostles
- Bartholomew, one of the twelve apostles
- Bashnouna, monk, martyr during the Islamic occupation of Egypt in 1164
- Basil, bishop of Caesarea
- Basilides and Potamiana, martyrs
- Basilissa, the child martyr
- Basilius, metropolitan of Jerusalem
- Basin and her Children
- Benjamin I, the 38th Pope of Alexandria
- Benjamin II, the 82nd Pope of Alexandria
- Bessarion, disciple of St. Anthony the Great and later St. Macarius the Great
- Bisada, the priest, martyr
- Bishoy Kamel, the hegumen
- Butamina, the chaste virgin, martyr

=== C ===
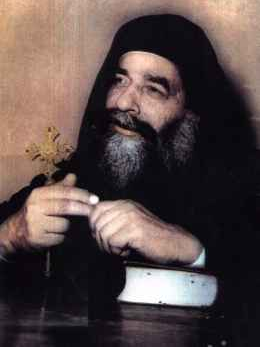
St. Cyril VI

- Candidus, commander of the Theban Legion
- Cassius and Florentius, members of the Theban Legion
- Catherine of Alexandria, virgin martyr
- Celadion, the 9th Pope of Alexandria
- Chiaffredo, member of the Theban Legion
- Christodoulos, the 66th Pope of Alexandria
- Chrysanthus and Daria, martyrs
- Clement of Alexandria, the 5th Dean of Catechetical School of Alexandria
- Cleopas, the apostle and bishop of Jerusalem
- Cleopatra
- Colluthus, of Antinoöpolis, martyr
- Constantine, the Emperor of the Roman Empire
- Cosmas I, the 44th Pope of Alexandria
- Cosmas II, the 54th Pope of Alexandria
- Cosmas III, the 58th Pope of Alexandria
- Cosmas and Damian, martyrs
- Cyprian and Justina, martyrs
- Cyracuse and Julietta
- Cyril, bishop of Jerusalem
- Cyril I, the 24th Pope of Alexandria
- Cyril II, the 67th Pope of Alexandria
- Cyril III, the 75th Pope of Alexandria
- Cyril IV, the 110th Pope of Alexandria
- Cyril V, the 112th Pope of Alexandria
- Cyril VI, the 116th Pope of Alexandria
- Cyrus and John, unmercenary physicians, wonderworkers, martyrs

=== D ===
- Dabamon

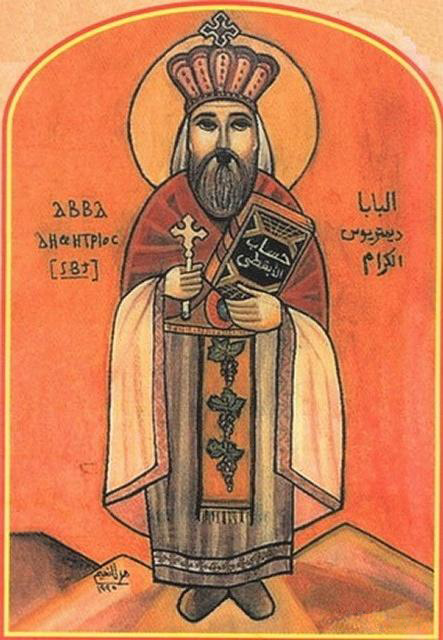
St. Demetrius

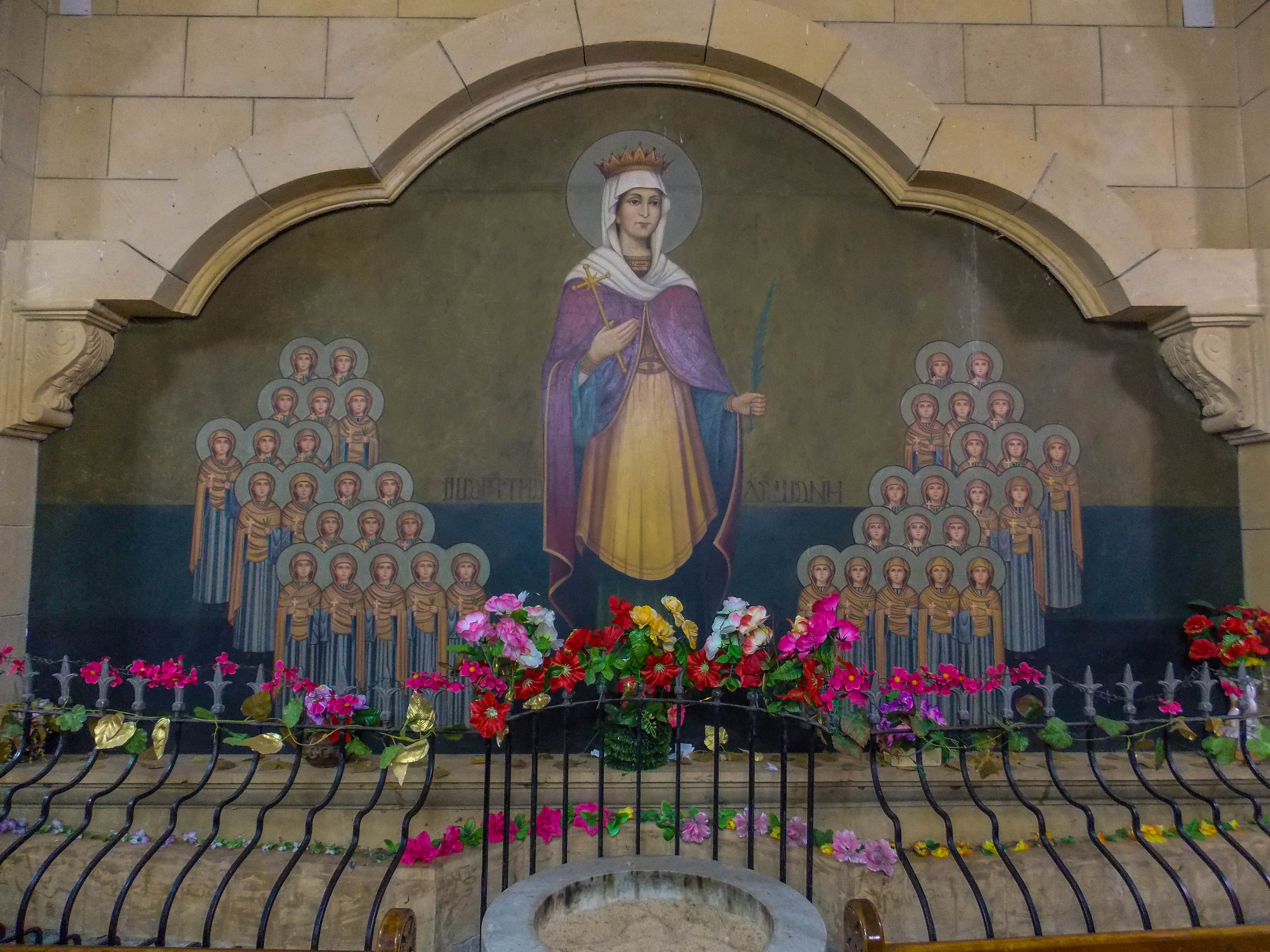
St. Demiana and the 40 Virgins

- Damian, the 35th Pope of Alexandria
- Daniel, the hegumen of Scetes during the 6th-century
- Daniel, the prophet
- Dasya, the soldier, 3rd-century martyr from Tanda
- David, the prophet and king
- Demetrius I, the 12th Pope of Alexandria
- Demetrius II, the 111th Pope of Alexandria
- Demiana and the 40 Virgins,
- Didymus the Blind, the 15th Dean of Catechetical School of Alexandria
- Dionysius, the 14th Pope of Alexandria
- Dioscorus I, the 25th Pope of Alexandria
- Dioscorus II, the 31st Pope of Alexandria
- Dorothea of Alexandria, virgin martyr

=== E ===
- Elias and four companions, martyrs
- Elijah, the prophet
- Elisa, the anchorite
- Elisha, the prophet
- Elizabeth, the mother of John the Baptist
- Ephrem the Syriac
- Epimachus of Pelusium, martyr
- Epiphanius of Salamis, bishop of Cyprus, spent most of his monastic life in Egypt
- Erastus, the apostle
- Esther, Queen of Persia
- Esther of Akhmim, martyr
- Eudokia, martyr
- Eugenius, Eugander, and Abilandius
- Eumenes, the 7th Pope of Alexandria
- Euphrasia, the virgin, moved to Egypt to join a Monastery of Nuns near Alexandria
- Eusebius, the historian, bishop of Caesarea
- Eusignius, the soldier, martyr
- Eutychus, the disciple of St. John the Evangelist
- Ezekiel, the prophet
- Ezekiel, the anchorite, disciple St. Paul of Tamouh

=== F ===
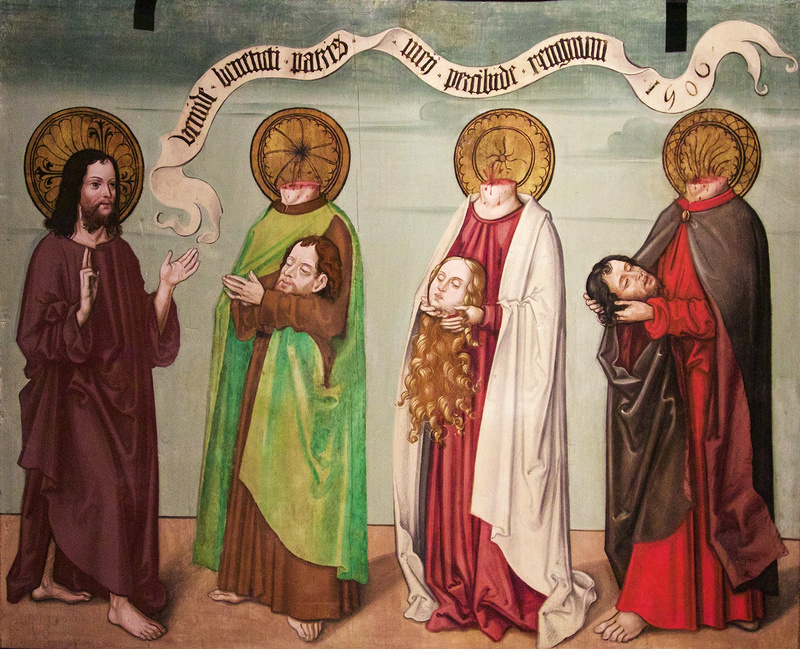
Sts. Felix, Regula, Exuperantius

- Faltaous, martyr
- Faltaous El-Souriani, the desert eagle, 21st-century monk
- Fana, the hermit, founder of Monastery of Saint Fana
- Faustus, Abibus and Dionysius of Alexandria, martyrs
- Febronia, the ascetic, virgin, martyr
- Felix the Pope of Rome
- Felix and Regula, members of the Theban Legion
- Freig (Tegi or Ruwais), 15th-century Egyptian

=== G ===
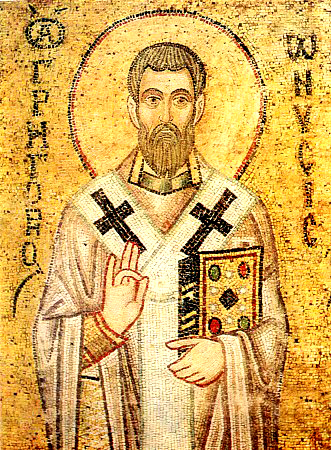
St. Gregory of Nyssa

- Gabriel I, the 57th Pope of Alexandria
- Gabriel II, the 70th Pope of Alexandria
- Gabriel III, the 78th Pope of Alexandria
- Gabriel IV, the 86th Pope of Alexandria
- Gabriel V, the 88th Pope of Alexandria
- Gabriel VI, the 91st Pope of Alexandria
- Gabriel VII, the 95th Pope of Alexandria
- Gabriel VIII, the 97th Pope of Alexandria
- Bishop Gabriel Abdel El-Metgaly, Bishop and martyr
- Gallicanus, bishop of Pelusium, martyr
- Gallicanus, martyr
- Gelasius, monk of Shiheet
- George, the ascetic
- George, the prince of martyrs
- George of Alexandria, martyr
- George El Mozahem, martyr during the Islamic occupation of Egypt in 969
- George the new martyr
- Gereon, member of the Theban Legion
- Ghalion, the anchorite
- Gideon one of the Judges of Israel
- Gregory, the ascetic
- Gregory, the illuminator, patriarch of Armenia
- Gregory, the theologian, bishop of Nyssa, brother of St. Basil the Great
- Gregory, the wonder-worker, bishop of Neocaesarea
- George, Bishop of Assiut, martyr

=== H ===
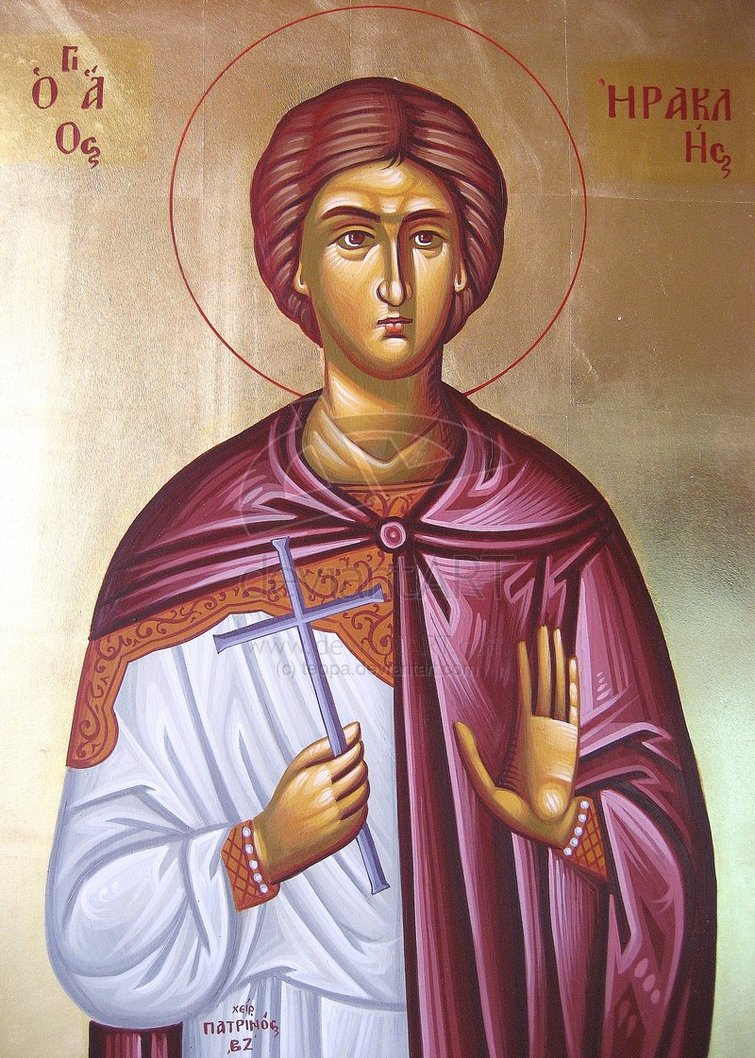
St. Heraclas

- Habakkuk, one of the minor twelve minor prophets
- Habib Girgis, dean of Catechetical School of Alexandria
- Hadid, the priest
- Haggai, one of the minor twelve minor prophets
- Hannah, the prophetess, mother of Samuel the prophet
- Hedra, the anchorite, bishop of Aswan
- Helena, empress, built numerous churches in Egypt
- Hepatius, bishop of Gangra
- Heraclas, the 13th Pope of Alexandria
- Heraclides, the martyr
- Hermina, the anchorite
- Hezekiah, the king
- Hilaria, daughter of Emperor Zeno, lived disguised as a monk
- Hilarion, the anchorite of Palestine
- Hor, the ascetic, disciple of St. Pachomius
- Hor, Besoy, and Daydara, martyr
- Hor and Susia and their children, and Agathon the hermit, martyrs at Tamouh
- Hosea, one of the minor twelve minor prophets
- Hour and his mother Theodora, martyrs
- Hour El-Siriakousy, martyr

=== I ===
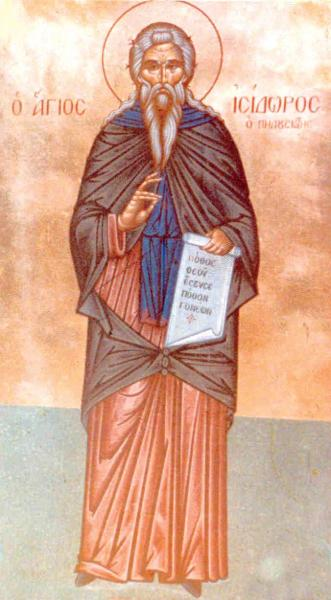
St. Isidore of Pelusium

- Ibrahim, the anchorite
- Ibrahim El-Gohary, formal prime minister of Egypt, built numerous churches
- Ignatius, patriarch of Antioch, martyr
- Irene, daughter of a pagan king
- Irini, the abbess of St. Mercurius Convent in Old Cairo
- Isaac, the 41st Pope of Alexandria
- Isaac of Hourin
- Isaac of Scetes, the disciple of St. Apollo
- Isaac of Tiphre
- Isaac, the hermit
- Isaac, the priest of El-Qalali
- Isaiah, the prophet
- Isidore, friend of Sina the soldier, martyr
- Isidore of Scété (died c. 390) Egyptian priest and desert ascetic
- Isidore of Pelusium, ascetic and scholar, relative of Theophilus of Alexandria and Cyril of Alexandria, the father of confession of Moses the Black

=== J ===
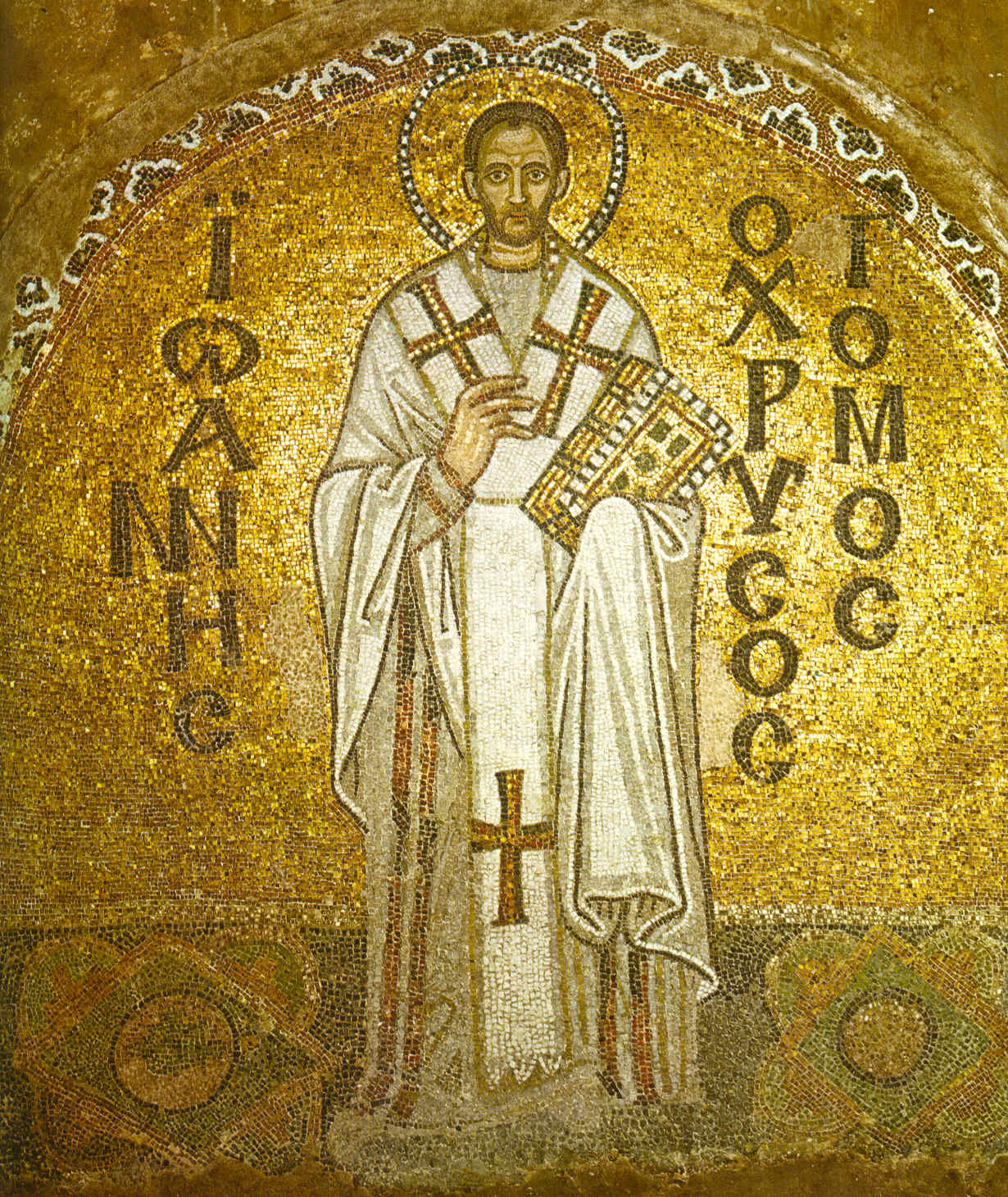
St. John Chrysostom

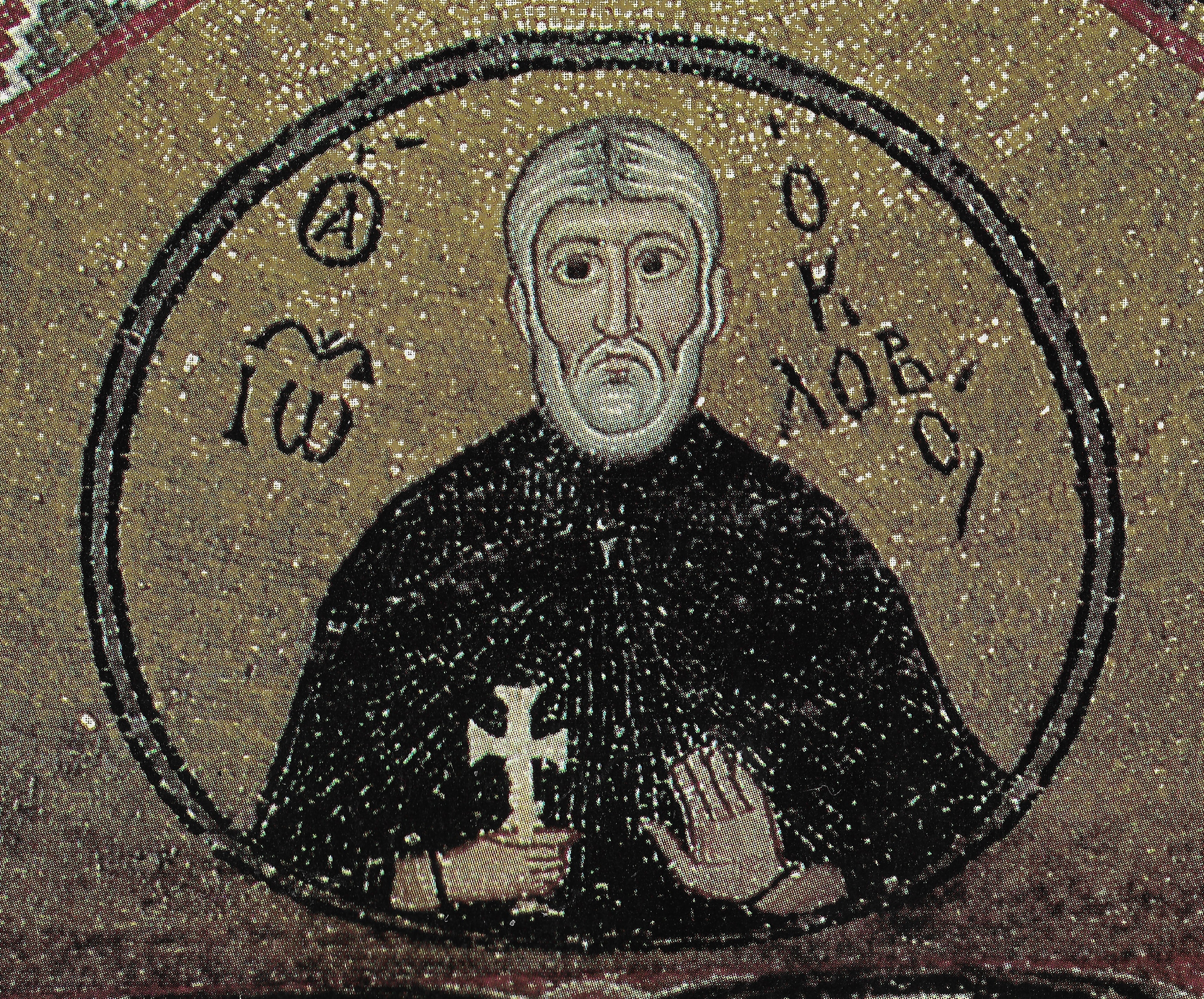
St. John Colobos

- Pope Jacob of Alexandria, the 50th Pope of Alexandria
- Jacob of Nisibis, bishop of Nisibis, spiritual father of St. Ephrem the Syrian
- Jacob of Serugh, the flute of the Holy Spirit
- James, the apostle and martyr, brother of John the Apostle
- James, the apostle and martyr, son of Alphaeus
- James, the ascetic
- James, bishop of Cairo
- James of Manug
- James, bishop of Jerusalem
- Jeremiah, the prophet
- Jerome, the priest, theologian, and historian
- Joachim, the grandfather of Christ
- Joel, one of the minor twelve minor prophets
- John I, the 29th Pope of Alexandria
- John II, the 30th Pope of Alexandria
- John III, the 40th Pope of Alexandria
- John IV, the 48th Pope of Alexandria
- John V, the 72nd Pope of Alexandria
- John VI, the 74th Pope of Alexandria
- John VII, the 77th Pope of Alexandria
- John VIII, the 80th Pope of Alexandria
- John IX, the 81st Pope of Alexandria
- John X, the 85th Pope of Alexandria
- John XI, the 89th Pope of Alexandria
- John XII, the 93rd Pope of Alexandria
- John XIII, the 94th Pope of Alexandria
- John XIV, the 96th Pope of Alexandria
- John XV, the 99th Pope of Alexandria
- John XVI, the 103rd Pope of Alexandria
- John XVII, the 105th Pope of Alexandria
- John XVIII, the 107th Pope of Alexandria
- John XIX, the 113th Pope of Alexandria
- John, 7th-century hegumen of Scetes
- John, the forerunner, baptist and martyr
- John, bishop of El-Borollos, who gathered the Synaxarion
- John, bishop of Nikiu
- John, the evangelist
- John Chrysostom, the golden month
- John Colobos, the short, one of the desert fathers
- John of Egypt, the anchorite
- John Kame, the priest
- John of Patmos, the author of the Book of Revelation
- John of Senhout, martyr
- John of Qalyub, monk from the monastery of St. Pishoy, and martyr
- Jonah, one of the minor twelve minor prophets
- Joseph, the 52nd Pope of Alexandria
- Joseph II, the 115th Pope of Alexandria
- Julian, the 11th Pope of Alexandria
- Julietta, martyr
- Julius of Aqfahs, the martyr and author of the biography of martyrs
- Justus, the 6th Pope of Alexandria
- Justus, disciple of St. Samuel The Confessor
- Justus, martyr, husband of St. Theoclia, and father of St. Apali

=== K ===
- Karas, the anchorite of Scetes, brother of Emperor Theodosius the Great
- Karas, first bishop of the United States
- Kaou, martyr
- Keriakos, the anchorite
- Kedron, the 4th Pope of Alexandria
- Kloug, physician, ascetic, priest, and martyr
- Kosheh Martyrs, martyrs during the Islamic occupation of Egypt in 2000

=== L ===
- Latsoun, the anchorite, native of El Bahnasa
- Lazarus of Bethany, the beloved of the Lord
- Lazarus, Salomi, his wife and their children, martyr
- Leonides of Alexandria, martyr, father of Origen
- Longinus, abbot of Ennaton monastery in Alexandria
- Longinus, Roman soldier who pierced Jesus Christ in his side on the cross
- Lucas I, bishop of Manfalut and Abnub
- Lucas II, bishop of Manfalut and Abnub
- Lucilianus and four others with him.
- Luke, one of the four evangelists

=== M ===
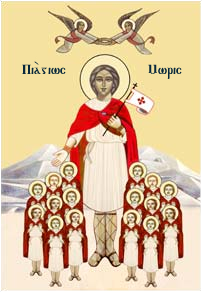
St. Maurice

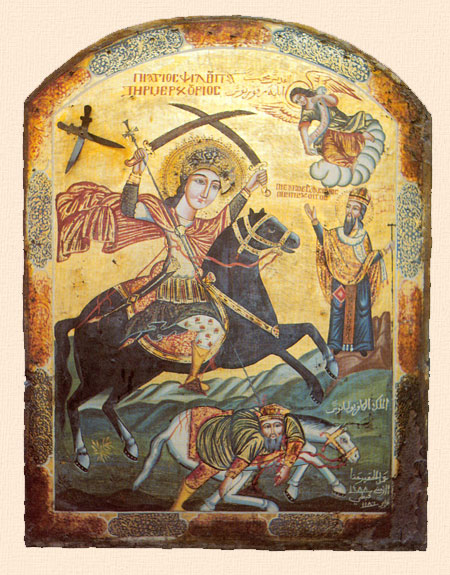
St. Mercurius

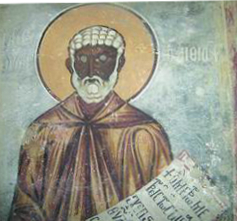
St. Moses the Black

- Macarius I, the 59th Pope of Alexandria
- Macarius II, the 69th Pope of Alexandria
- Macarius III, the 114th Pope of Alexandria
- Macarius of Alexandria, the abbot of the Coptic Monasteries
- Macarius, bishop of Edkow (Tkoou), martyr
- Macarius of Egypt, lamp of the desert, founder of several monasteries, including the Monastery of St. Macarius
- Malachi, one of the minor twelve minor prophets
- Malati, martyr during the Islamic occupation of Egypt in 1803
- Marina, the monk
- Mark I, the apostle, evangelist, martyr, author of the Gospel of Mark, and the 1st Pope of Alexandria
- Mark II, the 49th Pope of Alexandria
- Mark III, the 73rd Pope of Alexandria
- Mark IV, the 84th Pope of Alexandria
- Mark V, the 98th Pope of Alexandria
- Mark VI, the 101st Pope of Alexandria
- Mark VII, the 106th Pope of Alexandria
- Mark VIII, the 108th Pope of Alexandria
- Markianos, the 8th Pope of Alexandria
- Martha of Egypt, formerly a prostitute, she became an ascetic and lived for 25 years in the wilderness
- Mary, the ascetic, the shut-in
- Mary of Egypt, the anchorite
- Mary Magdalene
- Margaret the Virgin, virgin-Martyr and Vanquisher of Demons
- Maspero Martyrs, killed in 2011
- Matra, martyr from Alexandria
- Matruna, the martyr
- Matthew, the apostle, evangelist, and martyr
- Matthew I, the 87th Pope of Alexandria
- Matthew II, the 90th Pope of Alexandria
- Matthew III, the 100th Pope of Alexandria
- Matthew IV, the 102nd Pope of Alexandria
- Matthias, apostle
- St. Maurice, commander of the Theban Legion
- Maximus, the 15th Pope of Alexandria
- Maximus and Domatius, monks of Paromeos Monastery, disciples of Macarius of Egypt
- Melitina, the virgin and martyr
- Menas, the martyr and wonder-worker
- Menas, of Akhmim, monk and martyr during the Islamic occupation of Egypt
- Mercurius, the Saint with two swords
- Mercurius and Ephraem, monks, martyrs
- Memnon, Wonder worker and saint
- Micah, one of the minor twelve minor prophets
- Michael, bishop of Naqadah
- Michael I, the 46th Pope of Alexandria
- Michael II, the 53rd Pope of Alexandria
- Michael III, the 56th Pope of Alexandria
- Michael IV, the 68th Pope of Alexandria
- Michael V, the 71st Pope of Alexandria
- Michael VI, the 92nd Pope of Alexandria
- Michael at-Tukhi, martyr during the Islamic occupation of Egypt in 1837
- Mikhail Ibrahim, the priest
- Mikhaeil, metropolitan of Asyut
- Mina Ava-Mina, the bishop and first abbot the Monastery of St. Mina, disciple of St. Cyril VI
- Mina, bishop of Tamai (Thmoui)
- Mina I, the 47th Pope of Alexandria
- Mina II, the 61st Pope of Alexandria
- Misael, the anchorite of the Monastery of St. Samuel the Confessor
- Mohrael, child martyr
- Moisis (Moses), bishop of Ouseem
- Monica of Hippo
- Moura, martyr
- Moses, the prophet, former prince of Egypt
- Moses the Black, the strong, once a robber, he was converted and joined the monks under St. Isidore in the Wadi el-Natrun
- Mousa, the anchorite

=== N ===
- Nag Hammadi Martyrs
- Nahum, one of the minor twelve minor prophets
- Narcissus, bishop of Jerusalem
- Nehroua of Fayyum, martyr
- Nicanor, one of the seven deacons
- Nicholas, bishop of Myra
- Nilus of Sinai
- Noub, the Confessor

=== O ===
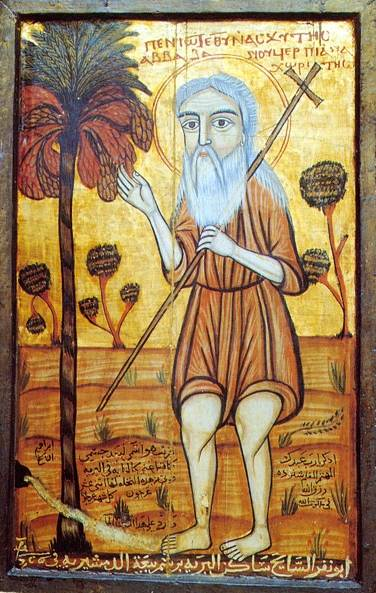
St. Onuphrius the Anchorite

- Obadiah, one of the minor twelve minor prophets
- Olaghi, the anchorite
- Onesimus, the disciple of St. Paul
- Onesiphorus, one of the seventy apostles
- Onuphrius, the anchorite, one of the desert fathers (also called, Abba Nofer)
- Or, the bishop
- Otimus, the priest

=== P ===
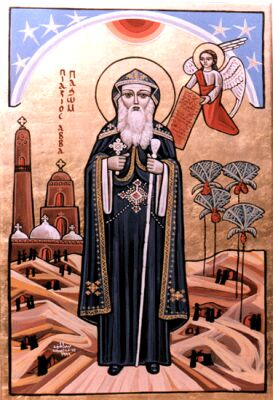
St. Pakhom

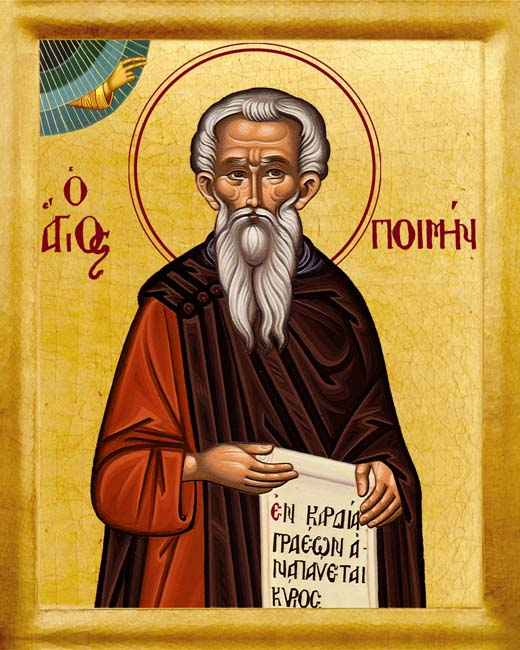
St. Poemen

- Pakhom, the father of cenobitic monasticism (i.e. of the Koinonia)
- Pa’esia (Athanasia) of Minuf
- Pambo, one of the desert father
- Pantaenus, the 4th Dean of Catechetical School of Alexandria
- Pantaleon, the physician and martyr
- Paphnutius, 10th-century bishop
- Paphnutius, the anchorite, disciple of St. Macarius of Egypt
- Paphnutius, bishop of Thebaid
- Philomena, Virgin, Martyr
- Parsoma, the "naked"
- Patapios, Desert Father, Hermit
- Paul, the Apostle
- Paul of Tamouh, 4th-century hermit
- Paul of Thebes, the first anchorite, the first hermit
- Paul the Simple, disciple of Anthony the Great
- Penitent Thief
- Peter, the brother of Andrew the Apostle
- Peter I, the 17th Pope of Alexandria
- Peter II, the 21st Pope of Alexandria
- Peter III, the 27th Pope of Alexandria
- Peter IV, the 34th Pope of Alexandria
- Peter V, the 82nd Pope of Alexandria
- Peter VI, the 104th Pope of Alexandria
- Peter VII, the 109th Pope of Alexandria
- Peter Elrahawy, bishop of Maiuma
- Philemon, the priest
- Philip, one of the twelve apostles
- Philip, one of the seven deacons
- Philogonus, patriarch of Antioch
- Philotheos, the 63rd Pope of Alexandria
- Philotheos, martyr during the Islamic occupation of Egypt in 1380
- Philoxenous
- Phoebammon (Aba-Fam), the soldier, martyr from Awsim
- Pigol, founder of the White Monastery
- Pijimi, the anchorite, one of the desert fathers
- Pisentios
- Pishay, founder of the Red Monastery
- Pishoy, the righteous and perfect man, the beloved of our Good Savior, the star of the desert
- Pisora, the bishop of Masil, martyr
- Poemen, one of the desert fathers at Scetes
- Porphyrius, bishop of Gaza
- Primus, the 5th Pope of Alexandria
- Prochorus, one of the seven deacons
- Prophorius (Porphyrius), jester martyred by Emperor Julian the Apostate after a mock baptism he refused to disown
- Protus and Hyacinth, martyrs
- Psote, bishop of Ebsay

=== Q ===
- Qozman El-Tahawy, martyr
- Quartus, one of the Seventy Disciples
- Quarshenoufa (Warshenofius), martyr

=== R ===
- Rais, martyr
- Rebecca and her five children Agathon, Peter, John, Amun, & Amuna
- Rhipsime, Gaiana, and her sisters the virgins

=== S ===
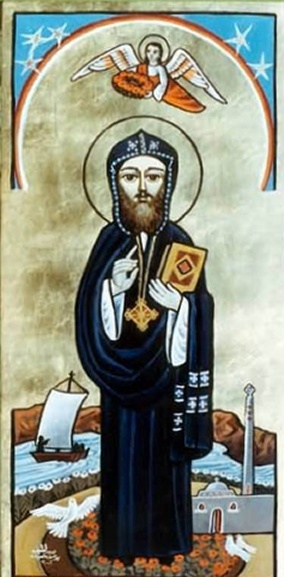
St. Severus

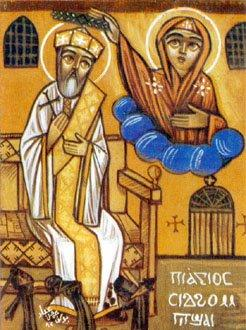
St. Sidhom Bishay

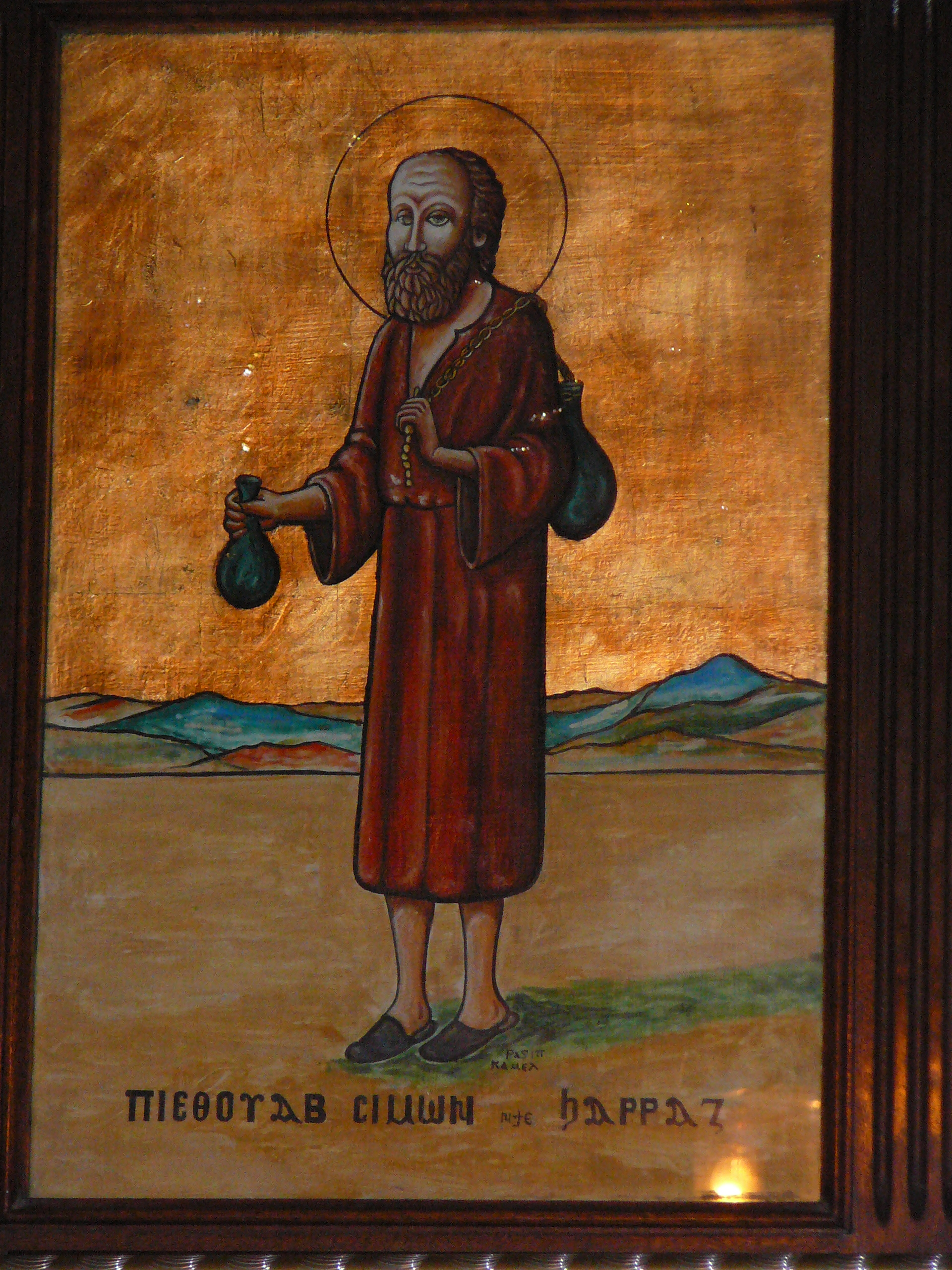
St. Simon

- Saint Salib, martyr during the Islamic occupation of Egypt
- Samson, one of the judges of Israel
- Samuel the Confessor, abbot of the El-Qualamon Monastery
- Samuel the Prophet
- Sana the soldier
- Sarah, the nun of Upper Egypt
- Sarah, one of the Desert Mother
- Sarah and her two Sons, martyr
- Sarapamon, archpriest of the Monastery St. John the Dwarf
- Sarapamon, bishop of Niku
- Sarapamon, the veiled, bishop of El-Monufia
- Savories
- Serapion, bishop of Thmuis, disciple of St. Anthony the Great and St. Athanasius the Apostolic
- Serapion, the monk
- Sergius and Bacchus, martyrs
- Severianus, bishop of Gabala
- Severus, bishop of Ashmunein, historian
- Severus, patriarch of Antioch
- Shenouda, the Archimandrite, abbot of the White Monastery
- Shenouda I, the 55th Pope of Alexandria
- Shenouda II, the 65th Pope of Alexandria
- Shenouda III, the 117th Pope of Alexandria
- Sidhom Bishay, martyr during the Islamic occupation of Egypt in 1844
- Silas, the anchorite
- Silvanus of Scetes, friend of St. Macarius the Great
- Simeon I, the 42nd Pope of Alexandria
- Simeon II, the 51st Pope of Alexandria
- Simeon, of Menouf, martyr during the Islamic occupation of Egypt
- Simon, the apostle and martyr
- Simon, the stylite
- Simon, the tanner, he moved the Mokattam mountain
- Sina, the soldier, martyr
- Sinouti el-Bahnasa, martyr
- Sisoes the Great, one of the desert fathers
- Sophia of Egypt, martyr
- Sousenyos, martyr
- Stephanos, the anchorite of the wilderness of Fayoum
- Stephen, the archdeacon, protomartyr
- Stephen, the priest & Niketa the martyr
- Stratios, the anchorite

=== T ===
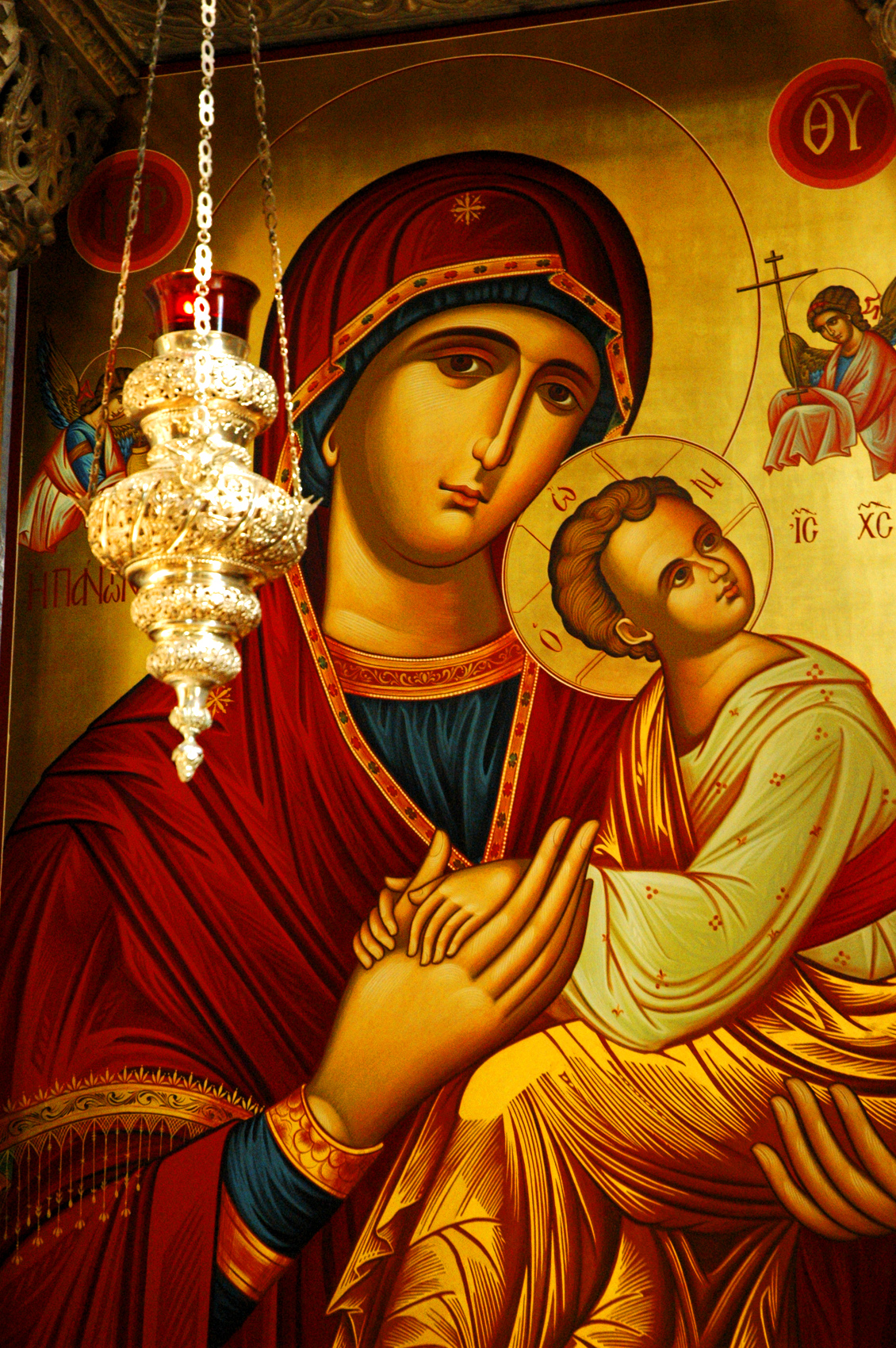
Theotokos, Saint Mary

- Tamada and her children, and Armenius and his mother
- Tekle Haymanot, the Ethiopian
- Thecla, the martyr
- Theoclia, martyr
- Theodora and Didymus, martyrs
- Theodora, 4th-century nun at the convent near Alexandria
- Theodora, chaste virgin martyr
- Theodora, the monk
- Theodore, disciple of St. Pakhomius
- Theodore the Martyr
- Theban Legion, is entire Roman legion of 6666 men
- Theodore, the prince of Mishreke
- Theodore, the prince of Shotb
- Theodoros I, the 45th Pope of Alexandria
- Theodorus, disciple of St. Pachomius
- Theodosius I, the 33rd Pope of Alexandria
- Theodosius II, the 79th Pope of Alexandria
- Theognosta, the virgin
- Theonas, the 16th Pope of Alexandria
- Theophilus I, the 23rd Pope of Alexandria
- Theophilus II, the 60th Pope of Alexandria
- Theophilus, the monk of the Ennaton monastery near Alexandria
- Theophilus, the bishop of Akhmim
- Theophilus & His Wife, martyr in Fayyum
- Theopista, took it upon herself to become a nun and honored with the holy Eskeem
- Theotokos, the pure, full of glory, ever-virgin, Saint Mary, who in truth, gave birth to God the Logos
- Thomas, the apostle and martyr
- Thomas, the anchorite of Shinshif
- Thomas, Victor, & Isaac, of the city of Ashmunein
- Timon, one of the seven deacons
- Timothy, the anchorite
- Timothy, the apostle, bishop, and martyr
- Timothy, bishop of Ansena
- Timothy I, the 22nd Pope of Alexandria
- Timothy II, the 26th Pope of Alexandria
- Timothy III, the 32nd Pope of Alexandria
- Titus, the apostle, and disciple of St. Paul

=== V ===
- Varus, the soldier and martyr
- Verena, associated with the Theban Legion
- Veronica, a young girl from the monastery of virgins near Akhmim, martyr during the Islamic occupation of Egypt in 749
- Victor, the soldier, from Asyut, martyr
- Vizier Abu Elaala Fahd ibn Ibrahim, martyr during the Islamic occupation of Egypt

=== W ===
- Wadamoun, first martyr in Upper Egypt
- Wanas, boy deacon from Luxor, martyr
- Wissa, disciple of St. Shenouda

=== Y ===
- Yostos El Antony, the silent monk
- Yostos, the bishop and martyr
- Yousab, the anchorite, native of Qift
- Yousab El Abah, the theologian, bishop of Girga and Akhmim
- Youstina, the martyr
- Youssef Asaad, contemporary priest in Giza

=== Z ===
- Zacharias, the 64th Pope of Alexandria
- Zacharias, bishop of Sakha
- Zacharias, the perfect monk of Scetes
- Zadok, and the 128 saints with him martyred in Persia
- Zechariah, the priest and martyr
- Zechariah, one of the minor twelve minor prophets
- Zephaniah, one of the minor twelve minor prophets
- Zosimas of Palestine, 5th-century anchorite

== Archangels ==
- Michael
- Gabriel
- Raphael
- Suriel (disputedly Uriel or Sariel)
- Sedakiel
- Sarathiel
- Ananiel

== Groups of martyrs ==
- 7 Martyrs on the Mount of St. Anthony
- 12 Martyrs of Naqlun
- 21 Martyrs of Libya
- 49 Martyrs of Shiheet
- 150 Men and 24 Women from Ansena
- 400 Martyrs in Dendera
- 3,600 Martyrs of Esna
- 6,600 Egyptian Soldiers of the Theban Legion
- 8,140 Martyrs in Akhmim
- 144,000 Children of Bethlehem
