= Pashons =

- Native name: Coptic: Ⲡⲁϣⲟⲛⲥ
- Calendar: Coptic calendar
- Month number: 9
- Number of days: 30
- Gregorian equivalent: May–June

Pashons (Coptic: Ⲡⲁϣⲟⲛⲥ, [paˈʃons]), also known as Pachon (Ancient Greek: Παχών, Pakhṓn) and Bachans (بشنس, Bashans), is the ninth month of the ancient Egyptian and Coptic calendars. It lasts between May 9 and June 7 of the Gregorian calendar.

The month of Pashons is also the first month of the Season of Shemu (Harvest) in Ancient Egypt, when the Egyptians harvest their crops throughout the land.

== Name ==
The name of the month of Pashons comes from Khonsu, a deity of the moon or of the Theban trinity and the son of Amun-Ra and Mut.

== Coptic Synaxarium of the month of Pashons ==
Coptic	Julian	Gregorian	Commemorations
Pashons 1	April 26	May 9	Nativity of the Holy Virgin St. Mary, the Mother of God (Theotokos).
Pashons 2	April 27	May 10	Departure of the Righteous Job.; Departure of St. Theodore, the disciple of St. Pachomius.; Martyrdom of St. Philotheos.; Enthronement of St. Cyril VI, the 116th Pope of Alexandria.
Pashons 3	April 28	May 11	Departure of St. Jason, one of the Seventy disciples.; Martyrdom of St. Otimus, the Priest.; Departure of St. Gabriel IV, the 86th Pope of Alexandria.
Pashons 4	April 29	May 12	Departure of St. John I, the 29th Pope of Alexandria.; Departure of St. John V, the 72nd Pope of Alexandria.
Pashons 5	April 30	May 13	Martyrdom of Jeremiah, the Prophet.
Pashons 6	May 1	May 14	Martyrdom of St. Isaac of Dafra.; Departure of St. Macarius of Alexandria.; Departure of St. Paphnute of El-Bandarah
Pashons 7	May 2	May 15	Departure of St. Athanasius the Apostolic, the 20th Pope of Alexandria.; Nativity of St. Shenoute
Pashons 8	May 3	May 16	Ascension of the Lord to Heaven.; Martyrdom of St. John of Senhout.; Departure of St. Daniel, Archpriest of Scetes.; Departure of Fr. Menassa Youhanna.
Pashons 9	May 4	May 17	Departure of St. Helena, the Empress.; Departure of St. John XI, the 89th Pope of Alexandria.; Departure of St. Gabriel VIII, the 97th Pope of Alexandria.
Pashons 10	May 5	May 18	Departure of the Three Young Men in the furnace: Hananiah, Azariah, & Mishael.
Pashons 11	May 6	May 19	Martyrdom of St. Theoclia, wife of St. Justus.; Departure of St. Paphnutius, the Bishop.; St. Nichomius
Pashons 12	May 7	May 20	Appearance of a Cross of Light above Golgotha in 351.; Commemoration of Michael, the Archangel.; Relocation of the relics of St. John Chrysostom from Comana to Constantinople.; Consecration of the Church of St. Demiana.; Departure of St. Mark VII, the 106th Pope of Alexandria.; Martyrdom of Master Malati.
Pashons 13	May 8	May 21	Departure of St. Arsenius, tutor of Arcadius and Honorius, sons of Emperor Theodosius the Great.
Pashons 14	May 9	May 22	Departure of St. Pachomius, Father of Cenobitic monasticism.; Martyrdom of St. Epimachus of Pelusium.
Pashons 15	May 10	May 23	Martyrdom of St. Simon the Zealot.; Martyrdom of the 400 saints in Dendera.; Commemoration of St. Mina the Deacon.; Sidrach
Pashons 16	May 11	May 24	Commemoration of St. John the Evangelist.
Pashons 17	May 12	May 25	Departure of St. Epiphanius, Bishop of Cyprus.
Pashons 18	May 13	May 26	Commemoration of the Feast of Pentecost.; Departure of St. George (Ga'orgi), friend of St. Abraam of Scetes.; Consecration of the Church of St. Paul at Alexandria.; Commemoration of St. Shenoute.; Martyrdom of men, women, and children on the route to the Monastery of St. Samuel.
Pashons 19	May 14	May 27	Departure of St. Isaac al-Qulali.; Martyrdom of St. Isidorus of Antioch.
Pashons 20	May 15	May 28	Departure of St. Ammonius, the Hermit.
Pashons 21	May 16	May 29	Commemoration of the Holy Virgin St. Mary, the Mother of God (Theotokos).; Departure of St. Martinianus of Caesarea.
Pashons 22	May 17	May 30	Departure of St. Andronicus, one of the Seventy disciples.
Pashons 23	May 18	May 31	Departure of St. Junia, one of the Seventy disciples.; Martyrdom of St. Julianus (Yulianus) and his mother.
Pashons 24	May 19	June 1	Entry of the Lord Christ into Egypt.; Departure of Habakkuk, the Prophet.; Martyrdom of the monk St. Bashnouna.
Pashons 25	May 20	June 2	Martyrdom of St. Colluthus of Antinoë.; Martyrdom of St. Hirutas.; Departure of Ibrahim El-Gohary.
Pashons 26	May 21	June 3	Martyrdom of St. Thomas the Apostle.
Pashons 27	May 22	June 4	Departure of St. John II, the 30th Pope of Alexandria.; Departure of Lazarus, the beloved of the Lord.
Pashons 28	May 23	June 5	Relocation of the relics of St. Epiphanius, Bishop of Cyprus.
Pashons 29	May 24	June 6	Departure of St. Simeon the Stylite.
Pashons 30	May 25	June 7	Departure of St. Fortunatus, one of the Seventy disciples.; Departure of St. Michael IV, the 68th Pope of Alexandria.; St. Dumadius & St. Simon the Little
