= Philotheos =

Philotheos (Greek: Φιλόθεος, "friend of God"), Latinized as Philotheus, may refer to:

== People ==
- Philotheus of Samosata (died 297), a companion in martyrdom of Romanus of Samosata
- Philotheus of Sinai (c. 9th or 10th century)
- Philotheus, a Byzantine court official, the author of the Kletorologion treatise, written in 899
- Philotheos (Coptic patriarch of Alexandria) (979–1003)
- Philotheus I of Constantinople (c. 1300 – 1379), ecumenical patriarch of Constantinople
- Saint Philotheos (died 1380), Coptic martyr
- Philotheos (Greek patriarch of Alexandria) (1435–1459)
- Philotheus of Pskov (1465–1542), Russian abbot
- Philotheos Skoufos (between 1615 and 1625 – 1685)
- Philotheos Bryennios (1833–1917), Greek Orthodox metropolitan of Nicomedia
- Philotheus Boehner (1901–1955)
- Philotheos Zervakos of Paros (1884–1980), Greek Orthodox elder
- Philotheos Karamitsos of Meloa (born 1924), retired bishop of the Greek Orthodox Archdiocese of America
- Philotheus of Pemdje (?), priest killed along with Abadir and Iraja

== Other ==
- Philotheos: International Journal for Philosophy and Theology, founded in 2001 and based at Belgrade
- Philotheou Monastery on Mt Athos

== See also ==
- Filotije, Serbian variant
