= Saint Sarah (disambiguation) =

Saint Sarah may refer to:

- Saint Sarah, Sara-la-Kali, patron saint of the Roma
- Sarah, wife of the patriarch Abraham
- Sarah the Martyr, Christian saint
- Saint Sarah (Hannah Montana), a recurring character in the television show Hannah Montana

== See also ==
- Sarah (female name)
