= Pope Joseph =

Pope Joseph may refer to:

- Pope Joseph I of Alexandria, 52nd pope of the Coptic Orthodox Church from 831-846.
- Pope Joseph II of Alexandria, 115h pope of the Coptic Orthodox Church from 1946-1956.
