= Theoclia =

Theoclia may refer to:

- Theoclia (sister of Alexander Severus), sister of the Roman emperor Alexander Severus
- Saint Theoclia, 4th century saint and martyr
