= Michael IV =

Michael IV may refer to:

- Byzantine Emperor Michael IV the Paphlagonian (r. 1034–1041)
- Ecumenical Patriarch Patriarch Michael IV of Constantinople (1207–1213)
- Pope Michael IV of Alexandria (1092–1102)
