= Hathor (month) =

- Native name: Coptic: Ϩⲁⲑⲱⲣ
- Calendar: Coptic calendar
- Month number: 3
- Number of days: 30
- Gregorian equivalent: November–December

Hathor (Coptic: Ϩⲁⲑⲱⲣ, Hathōr), also known as Athyr (Ancient Greek: Ἀθύρ, Athýr) and Hatur (Arabic: هاتور), is the third month of the ancient Egyptian and Coptic calendars. It lies between November 10 and December 9 of the Gregorian calendar.

The month of Hathor is also the third month of the season of Akhet (Inundation) in Ancient Egypt, when the Nile floods historically covered the land of Egypt; they have not done so since the construction of the High Dam at Aswan.

== Name ==
The name of the month comes from Hathor, one of the most important goddesses in ancient Egypt. Festivals in her honor are thought to have taken place throughout the month.

== Coptic Synaxarium of the month of Hathor ==
Coptic	Julian	Gregorian	Commemorations
Hathor 1	October 28	November 10	Martyrdom of the Sts Maximus, Numitius, Victor (Boctor), and Philip (Philopus); Commemoration of St. Cleopas the Apostle and his companion.
Hathor 2	October 29	November 11	Departure of St. Peter III, the 27th Pope of Alexandria.
Hathor 3	October 30	November 12	Departure of St. Cyriacus the Anchorite.; Departure of St. Athanasius & his sister St. Irene
Hathor 4	October 31	November 13	Martyrdom of Sts. John & James, bishops of Persia; Martyrdom of St. Epimachus & St. Adrianus (Azarianus); Martyrdom of St. Thomas of Damascus
Hathor 5	November 1	November 14	Appearance of the head of Saint Longinus, the Soldier.; Martyrdom of St. Timothy and the relocation of the body of St. Theodore, the Prince, to Shotb; Departure of St. Joseph II, the 115th Pope of Alexandria.; Enthronement of Pope Shenouda III, the 117th Pope of Alexandria.
Hathor 6	November 2	November 15	Departure of St. Felix, the 26th Bishop of Rome.; Consecration of the Church of the Virgin in the Muharraq Monastery
Hathor 7	November 3	November 16	Martyrdom of St. George of Alexandria; Martyrdom of St. Nehroua of Fayyum; Departure of St. Mina, Bishop of Tamai (Thmoui); Consecration of the Church of St. George of Cappadocia; Departure of Metropolitan Archbishop Athanasius, of the Metropolis of Beni Suef and El-Bahnasa.
Hathor 8	November 4	November 17	Commemoration of the Four Incorporeal Beasts
Hathor 9	November 5	November 18	Departure of St. Isaac, the 41st Pope of Alexandria.; Assembly of the First Ecumenical Council at Nicaea in the year 325 AD.
Hathor 10	November 6	November 19	Martyrdom of St. Sophia & the Fifty Virgins; Assembly of a council in Rome because of the Feast of Theophany and Lent
Hathor 11	November 7	November 20	Departure of St. Anne (Hannah), the mother of the Theotokos.; Martyrdom of St. Archelaus and the martyrdom of Elisha the Hegumen
Hathor 12	November 8	November 21	Commemoration of Michael, the Archangel.
Hathor 13	November 9	November 22	Departure of St. Timothy, Bishop of Ansena; Departure of St. Zacharias, the 64th Pope of Alexandria.
Hathor 14	November 10	November 23	Departure of St. Martinus (Martin), Bishop of Thrace; Departure of Metropolitan Archbishop Mikhail, of the Metropolis of Asyut.
Hathor 15	November 11	November 24	Martyrdom of St. Menas, the Wonder Worker.
Hathor 16	November 12	November 25	Beginning of the Fast of the Nativity (Advent) in the Coptic Church; Consecration of the Church of St. Abu-Nofer (Onuphrius); Martyrdom of St. Yostus, the Bishop; Martyrdom of St. Wannas
Hathor 17	November 13	November 26	Departure of St. John Chrysostom.
Hathor 18	November 14	November 27	Martyrdom of the two saints Atrasis & Yoana (Junia); Martyrdom of St. Philip the Apostle.
Hathor 19	November 15	November 28	Consecration of the Church of St. Sergius & St. Bacchus; Commemoration of the preaching of St. Bartholomew the Apostle
Hathor 20	November 16	November 29	Departure of St. Anianus, the 2nd Pope of Alexandria.; Consecration of the churches of Prince Theodore, the Son of John El-Shotbe, and Prince Theodore El-Mishreke
Hathor 21	November 17	November 30	Commemoration of the Holy Virgin Saint Mary, the Mother of God (Theotokos).; Departure of St. Gregory, the Wonder Worker.; Departure of St. Cosma II, the 54th Pope of Alexandria.; Commemoration of the Holy Martyrs Sts. Alphaeus, Zacchaeus, Romanus, & John; Commemoration of the Sts Thomas, Victor, and Isaac of the City of Ashmunein
Hathor 22	November 18	December 1	Martyrdom of Sts. Cosmas and Damian, their brothers & their mother.
Hathor 23	November 19	December 2	Departure of St. Cornelius the Centurion.; Consecration of the Church of St. Marina
Hathor 24	November 20	December 3	Commemoration of the Twenty-Four Priests
Hathor 25	November 21	December 4	Martyrdom of St. Mercurius, the saint with the two swords.
Hathor 26	November 22	December 5	Martyrdom of Sts. Tiburtius (Thiborinos), Valerian (Balaryanos), & Maximus.; Commemoration of St. Gregory, Bishop of Nyssa.
Hathor 27	November 23	December 6	Martyrdom of St. James the Mangled (Sawn)
Hathor 28	November 24	December 7	Martyrdom of St. Sarapamon, Bishop of Niku
Hathor 29	November 25	December 8	Martyrdom of St. Peter, the 17th Pope of Alexandria.; Martyrdom of St. Clement, the 4th Bishop of Rome.
Hathor 30	November 26	December 9	Departure of St. Acacius, Patriarch of Constantinople.; Martyrdom of St. Macarius; Consecration of the Church of Sts. Cosmas, Damian, their brothers and their mother

== See also ==
- Egyptian, Coptic, and Islamic calendars
