= Wanas =

Christian child saint of lost things

Saint Wanas

Child Martyr
- Born: 4th century
- Died: 4th century
- Venerated in: Coptic Orthodox Church; Coptic Catholic Church
- Feast: 16 Hathor (25 November)
- Patronage: lost things

Wanas (Coptic: Ⲁⲃⲃⲁ ⲓⲱⲁⲛⲛⲏⲥ; Arabic: القديس ونس) was a Coptic child martyr born to poor parents from Thebes (now Luxor), Egypt. He is venerated as the patron saint of lost things.

== Life and martyrdom ==
Wanas was an only son and a servant in the church. He lived during a period of persecution under the Romans. He became known as a fearless and wise speaker who helped people to adhere to the Christian faith. Consequently, the Roman Governor Arianus of Alexandria (who later became a Christian martyr himself) was displeased when he heard of Wanas. Arianus was the Roman ruler of Ansena (Antinoöpolis). He sent soldiers with orders to make him abandon his faith. The child refused so the governor ordered him to be tortured by cutting off his head. That was on 16th Hathor of the Coptic calendar. He was martyred during the same period as other child martyrs such as Abanoub.
