= Pope Simeon II of Alexandria =

Head of the Coptic Church from in 830

Saint Simeon II of Alexandria
- 51st Pope of Alexandria & Patriarch of the See of St. Mark
- Papacy began: 15 February 830
- Papacy ended: 6 October 830 (9 Babah in the Coptic calendar)
- Predecessor: James
- Successor: Joseph I

Personal details
- Born: Alexandria, Egypt
- Died: 6 October 830
- Buried: Saint Mark's Church
- Denomination: Coptic Orthodox Christian
- Residence: Saint Mark's Church

Sainthood
- Feast day: 6 October (3 Babah in the Coptic calendar)

Pope Simeon II of Alexandria, 51st Pope of Alexandria and Patriarch of the See of St. Mark.

This saint was the son of Orthodox Christian parents of the nobles of Alexandria, Egypt. He chose for himself the monastic life, so he went to the desert of Scetes. He became a monk in the cell of his predecessor James, the Patriarch. He dwelt with Pope James for many years during which he exhausted his body by strenuous ascetic life, and many worships.

When Mark II became a Patriarch, he requested St. Simeon from his spiritual father Pope James for what was known of his good reputation and his sound judgement. He stayed with Pope Mark II until his departure. When Pope James, his spiritual father, became patriarch, he kept St. Simeon II with him and he benefitted from him often. When Pope James departed, the bishops, priests, and elders unanimously agreed with a spiritual unity to bring forward this father for what they had seen of him (as to righteousness and Orthodox Faith) during his stay with the two Patriarchs who proceeded him. They seized him, bound him and ordained him a Patriarch.

He did not stay on the throne for long, but died after five and a half months in office.

| Preceded by Jacob | Coptic Pope; 830 | Succeeded by Joseph I |
