= Abuna Sawiros =

Abuna Sawiros (Severus) was an Abuna, or head of the Ethiopian Orthodox Church in the 11th century.

During this period the Abun was appointed by the Pope of Alexandria and Patriarch of All Africa, who had diocesan authority over Ethiopia, at the request of the Emperor of Ethiopia, usually after paying a substantial fee to the Muslim government for the privilege. Pope Cyril II intended to appoint one candidate, but Badr al-Jamali, the Vizier of Caliph Al-Mustansir, forced him to ordain Sawiros instead. Although at first warmly welcomed when he reached Ethiopia, the Caliph's candidate began to openly favor Islam in that Christian country by building seven mosques, ostensibly for the use of Muslim traders. This led to a general uproar in Ethiopia. Sawiros justified his acts by saying a refusal to build these mosques would result in a persecution in Egypt; nevertheless, the Abuna was imprisoned, the seven mosques destroyed, and restrictions placed on the Muslim traders. Reciprocal acts followed in Egypt, leading to a rupture in the relations between the two countries.
