= Abāmūn of Tarnūt =

Coptic martyr

Saint Abamun of Tarnut

Martyr
- Born: 4th century Tarnut, Egypt
- Died: 372; Alexandria, Egypt
- Venerated in: Oriental Orthodoxy (Coptic Orthodox Church); Eastern Orthodox Churches; Catholic Church
- Feast: 3 August (27 Epip)

Abāmūn of Tarnūt is a saint and was a martyr of the fourth-century Coptic Church. He is known only from his name being mentioned in the Synaxarion of Mikhail of Atrib (c.1240). His feast day is 3 August (27 Epip). His name is related to the ancient Egyptian god of Amun.

== Legend ==
Abāmūn was from the city of Tarnut (Arabic: طرنوط., Coptic: ⲑⲉⲣⲉⲛⲟⲩϯ, romanized: Therenuti) He came to Upper Egypt, and was a witness to the persecution of Christians at that time. He presented himself to Arianus, the governor of Ansena, as a Christian. The governor tortured Abāmūn through a variety of methods, including blows, nails in the body, iron combs, and stringing him up. Thereafter, Arianus sent Abāmūn to Alexandria. There, Abāmūn's example inspired a number of other Christians to accept martyrdom.

One of the others who was inspired by Abāmūn's example was a girl named Theophila. She criticized the governor and his allies, specifically including criticism of their idolatry. For this, she was cast into the fire. The fire did not harm her, however, so she was subsequently beheaded.

Abāmūn himself had his limbs cut off and was beheaded.

== Church of Saint Abamūn ==
The church of Saint Abamūn, while bearing his name, may not necessarily be devoted to Abāmūn of Tarnūt. There was another martyr of similar description who bore the same first name, and because the church only mentions a Christian name, it cannot be sure whether the church was dedicated to Abāmūn of Tarnūt or Abāmūn of Tukh, who was also mentioned in the Synaxarion of Mikhail of Atrib. There is yet another Abamun, included in Les Martyrs d'Égypte by Hippolyte Delehaye, who seems to be this individual, as he was stated to have been martyred in Alexandria.
