= Elias and Companions =

Group of Egyptian Christian martyrs

Elias and four companions, Daniel, Isaiah, Jeremiah (also known as Jeremy and Jeremias), and Samuel were Egyptian martyrs. Their feast day is February 16.

During Maximinus' persecution, a number of Christians were condemned for life to slavery in the copper mines of Roman Cilicia. Elias and his companions visited them to provide comfort.

Upon their return to Egypt in 309, they were stopped at the gates of Caesarea, Palestine, and questioned. Upon confessing the reason for their journey, they were arrested. The following day they, along with Pamphilus who had also been caught up in the persecutions, were brought before the provincial governor Firmilian.

Accused of being Christians, they were racked and interrogated. Elias and his friends identified themselves by their baptismal names and their country as "Jerusalem", a reference to the Christians' heavenly Jerusalem. The city of Jerusalem had been sacked by Titus and later rebuilt as Aelia Capitolina. Firmilian had them further tortured to discover the location of their true country, and at last, tired with tormenting them, condemned them to be beheaded.

When Porphyry, a servant of Pamphilus, demanded that the bodies be buried, he was tortured and then burned to death when it was found that he was a Christian. St. Seleucus witnessed his death and was overheard applauding Porphyry's constancy in the face of this terrible death; whereupon he was arrested by the soldiers involved in the execution, brought before the governor, and beheaded at Firmilian's order. The historian Eusebius was in Caesarea, and gave a vivid account of their martyrdom by torture and beheading.
