= Pope Jacob of Alexandria =

Head of the Coptic Church from 819 to 830

Saint Jacob of Alexandria
- Pope of Alexandria & Patriarch of the See of St. Mark
- Papacy began: 819
- Papacy ended: 21 February 830
- Predecessor: Mark II
- Successor: Simeon II

Personal details
- Born: Egypt
- Died: 21 February 830
- Buried: Tanda, Egypt
- Denomination: Coptic Orthodox Christian
- Residence: Saint Mark's Church

Sainthood
- Feast day: 21 February (14 Amshir in the Coptic calendar)

Pope Jacob of Alexandria, also known as James, was the 50th Pope of Alexandria and Patriarch of the See of St. Mark from 819 to 830.

Pope Jacob ordained Abuna Yohannes as the head of the Ethiopian Orthodox Church, according to the History of the Patriarchs of Alexandria; however, civil war, drought, and plague in Ethiopia forced Yohannes to return to Alexandria, where he remained through Pope Jacob's tenure.

Religious titles
Preceded by Mark II	Coptic Pope; 819–830	Succeeded by Simeon II
