= Filotije =

- Gender: Masculine

Origin
- Origin: Philotheos, from Greek
- Meaning: "friend of God"

Other names
- Related names: variant Filotej

Filotije is a Serbian male given name, derived from the Greek name Philotheos. It may refer to:

- Filotije, Metropolitan of Lim
- Filotije, Metropolitan of Belgrade-Syrmia (1481)
- Filotije Racanović (d. May 1751), Metropolitan of Herzegovina (1740-1751)
- Filotije Banjac, Serbian Orthodox monk

== See also ==
- Filotijević
- Filotić
- Philotheos (disambiguation)
