= Abadir and Iraja =

Abadir and Iraja (Ter and Erai)

Saint
- Died: Roman era Antinoe
- Venerated in: Coptic Church Roman Catholic Church
- Major shrine: Asyut, Egypt
- Feast: September 25 (Gregorian Calendar), October 8 (Julian Calendar)

Abadir and Iraja are saints in the Coptic Church and the Roman Catholic Church.

== Legend ==
They are reported to have been children of the sister of Basilides, "the father of kings". According to their legend, Abadir and Iraja fled from Antioch to Alexandria. They were arrested there and brought to Antinoe in Upper Egypt, where they were beheaded along with Cluthus, a physician and priest, and another 3,685 companions. These included the following priests:

- Apa Paphnutius of Tentyra
- Apa Isaac of Tiphre
- Apa Shamul of Taraphia
- Apa Simon of Tapcho
- Sissinus of Tantatho
- Theodore of Shotep
- Moses of Psammaniu
- Philotheus of Pemdje
- Macarius of Fayum
- Maximus of Vuchim
- Macroni of Thoni
- Senuthius of Buasti
- Simeon of Thou
- Ptolemaeus, son of the Eparch, and
- Thomas of Tanphot.

Abadir and Iraja had a church dedicated to them in Asyut in Egypt. Their feast day is on September 25 (Gregorian Calendar) and October 8 (Julian Calendar). The text of their Passion exists in both Sahidic and Bohairic Coptic and fragments can be found at the National Library, Vienna, Wiener Papyrussammlung, K2563 a-l, ed. Orlandi, 1974, the National Library, Paris, Copte 129.16.104 and the Vatican Library, Rome, Copti 63, fols. 1-65, ed. Hyvernat, 1886–1887.

A summary of their lives, commemorated on Tout 28 (October 8), can be found in the Copto-Arabic Synaxarion.

Hagiographer and church historian Frederick George Holweck considers the story "spurious".
