= Dasya =

Christian martyr of the third century

Saint Dasya

Martyr
- Born: 3rd century Tanda, Egypt
- Died: 3rd century Tanda, Egypt
- Venerated in: Oriental Orthodoxy
- Feast: 2 Thout

Saint Dasya the Soldier (Arabic: داسيا) or Daysa the Egyptian, was a Christian martyr of the third century. He was born in Tanda, Egypt (Coptic: ⲑⲱⲓϯ, modern Tida in Kafr el-Sheikh Governorate), and served as a soldier in the Roman army. Refusing to deny Christ, Dasya was tortured by Arianus, governor of Ansena, who inflicted great tortures on him, eventually cutting off his head.

He is a saint in the Coptic Church and Ethiopian Orthodox Tewahedo Church. His feast in the Coptic Orthodox Church is on 2 Thout.
