= Anba George =

Egyptian bishop (died 1169)

Saint George

Martyr, Bishop
- Born: 12th century Talkha, Egypt
- Died: 1169; Assiut, Egypt
- Venerated in: Coptic Orthodox Church
- Major shrine: Monastery of Saint George Assiut, Egypt

Saint George of Assiut was an Egyptian bishop of the Coptic Orthodox Church.

== Early life ==
Born to a Christian family, at the end of the Fatimid era in Talkha. His father was working as a trader, and one time when he was returning from a business trip in France his wife gave birth to a child. She named him George after a bishop in France at the time. When George was a young man, he went to "Šihēt" (Wadi El Natrun now) to become a monk in Monastery of Saint Macarius the Great. At the time, the Crusades broke out and Egypt was under the rule of the governor Shirkuh. Copts in Egypt were subjected to a lot of persecution and taxes were increased. Those who failed to pay were subjected to torture and sometimes murdered or forced to convert to Islam. The situation continued to be what it was under the rule of Governor Saladin. St. George and all the Christians in Assiut decided not to pay these high taxes. Saladin was angered and ordered the demolition of all the churches in Assiut and their conversion into mosques, but could not carry this order out. They demolished only one church called Marker, but they could not build a mosque on its ruins. Saladin was very angry and ordered the army to move towards Assiut. St. George ordered the people of Assiut to fast and pray for three days, so the weather was soaked and the winds were so strong that soldiers were prevented from breaking into the city and returned to where they came from, which increased Saladin's anger and made him sent a larger military contingent from his army.

== Martyrdom ==
On Sunday the army stormed the city of Assiut from its north, where the Bishop's residence and monastery are until today (Monastery of St. George, Assiut). He was arrested and tortured and then beheaded, being martyred in the name of Christ with 5000 men, women and children.
