= Saint Salib =

16th-century Egyptian Coptic Christian saint

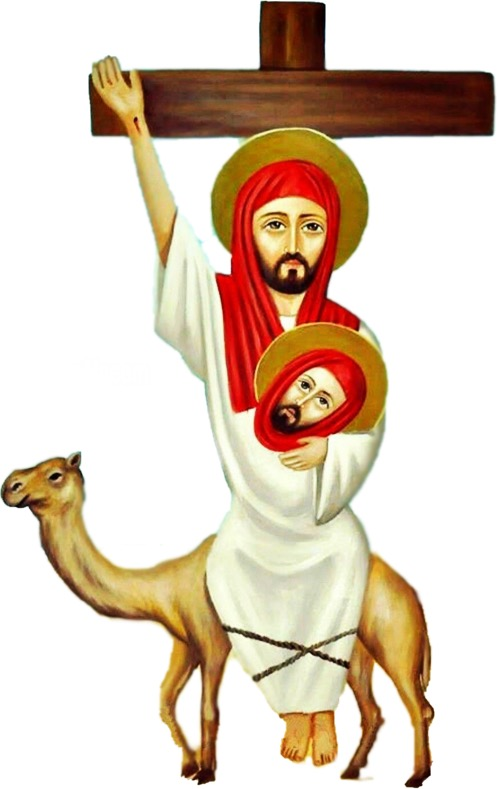
- Recent Coptic Icon depicting Saint Salib crucified, on the camel, while holding his own beheaded head

New Martyr
- Born: Mallawi, Minya, Mamluk Sultanate of Egypt
- Died: 29 November 1512; Cairo, Mamluk Sultanate of Egypt
- Cause of death: Stoning, Crucifixion, Beheading
- Honored in: Oriental Orthodoxy; Eastern Orthodoxy
- Major shrine: Haret Zuweila Church of Mary
- Feast: 29 November
- Attributes: Red shemagh, white thawb, scimitar, camel, chains, shackles

Saint Salib (Egyptian Arabic: قديس صليب; Coptic: ⲫⲏⲉⲑⲟⲩⲁⲃ ⲡⲓⲥⲧⲁⲩⲣⲟⲥ; Syriac: ܡܪ ܨܠܝܒ; Greek: Αγιος Σταυρος) was a 16th-century Egyptian Coptic Christian saint and martyr from the Mamluk era, who refused to convert to Islam while under trial, and got publicly executed under Al-Ashraf Qansuh al-Ghuri by being crucified, placed on a camel and paraded through Cairo, finally having been beheaded with a scimitar.

== Biography ==
It is unclear whether Salib was the descendant of Arab converts or simply an Arabized Copt, most sources state that it was his parents that gave him the Arabic name Salib, yet still belonged to the semi-ethnoreligious Coptic Orthodox Church. Other sources attest him with the name Pistavros, though this is simply a Greek translation of the Arab name Salib with a Coptic language prefix. Two plausible explanations might be the following: simple cultural syncretism in the largely Arabized Mamluk Sultanate into which Salib was born, or an adoption from the Syriac cognate name Sliba, though if properly transliterated from Syriac, the name should be Saliba, not Salib.

Saint Salib wanted to live a life of celibacy and asceticism, however his parents went on to force him into marriage. Nevertheless, he agreed with his wife to remain virgins and live a chaste life.

He went about consulting churches, monasteries and the desert Fathers (through writing and prayer) to learn from them about Christ. He considered becoming a monk, but when his parents found him, they bound him with chains lest he goes away again, but to their surprise, the chains around his feet opened in front of their eyes with their locks broken.

When under his parents custody, he loved to pray regularly during his stay. After one of his prayers, Virgin Mary appeared to him in a dream to tell him that he was to be martyred soon.

Saint Salib went on to preach courageously and publicly, which incited some unbelievers to convert, and others to tell the governor of Egypt of his doings. He was put on trial, first being promised material rewards to deny his faith and convert to Islam, when he refused, he was insulted by the attending crowd, then he was beaten and finally convicted to be stoned as a result of his declaration of faith, but when he was stoned, his wounds disappeared, and he did not die. Finally he was put in prison, but whenever the guard would put chains around his feet, they would immediately break free again.

He was sent to the king Al-Ashraf Qansuh al-Ghuri who, after failing to change his mind in a debate, sent him to the court judges again, who sentenced him to execution via crucifixion. He was nailed to a cross, put on a camel and paraded through the streets of Cairo, once everyone had seen him, he finally was beheaded with a scimitar.

== Relics ==
Pope John XIII of Alexandria received his relics with great honor and carried them to various churches so that people may take his blessing.

He finally decided to place his body in the Haret Zuweila Church of the Virgin Mary, where it sits today.
