= Thomas the Hermit =

Egyptian saint

Thomas the Hermit (c. 4th century) is a saint of the Coptic Orthodox Church; he is commemorated on the 27th day of the Coptic month of Pashons (4 June).

Thomas was born in Upper Egypt, in a small village known as "Shenshif". He is revered by the Coptic Orthodox Church, since he is one of the early Anchorites, or Desert Fathers. Little is commonly known about him.

== Stories ==
- Thomas was granted the gift of prophecy
  - Thomas is commonly believed to have predicted his own death.
- Thomas is said to have sat with Christ
  - It was recorded by Shenouda that as he walked towards the cave Thomas inhabited in order to bury his body, he saw Jesus Christ fly off with the Thomas's Spirit.

== Monasteries and churches ==
There are multiple churches dedicated to Thomas the Hermit thanks to the efforts of the late Fr. Abram Anba Thomas who, out of his love for Thomas, preached far and wide concerning Thomas the Hermit and helped renovate the Monastery of Thomas :

- Saint Thomas the Hermit Monastery, Akhmem, Egypt
- Saint Thomas the Hermit Coptic Orthodox Church, Temecula, United States
