= Pope Macarius II of Alexandria =

Head of the Coptic Church from 1102 to 1128

Saint Macarius II of Alexandria
- Pope of Alexandria and Patriarch of the See of St. Mark
- Papacy began: 1102
- Papacy ended: 14 September 1128
- Predecessor: Michael IV
- Successor: Gabriel II

Personal details
- Born: Egypt
- Died: 14 September 1128 Egypt
- Buried: Monastery of Saint Macarius the Great
- Denomination: Coptic Orthodox Christian
- Residence: The Hanging Church

Sainthood
- Feast day: 14 September (4 Thout in the Coptic calendar)

Pope Macarius II of Alexandria, the 69th Pope of Alexandria and Patriarch of the See of St. Mark. He is commemorated in the Calendar of Saints of the Coptic Church on 4 Thout.

== Life ==
Pope Macarius II was pious and ascetic since his young age, and longed for the monastic life. He went to the desert of Scetes and became a monk in the Monastery of Saint Macarius the Great. He devoted himself to worship and spiritual struggle. He instructed himself by reading the Holy Scriptures, their interpretation and by contemplating on its meaning. He grew in virtues and was ordained a priest.

When Pope Michael IV, the sixty-eighth pope, departed and the papal throne became vacant, a group of bishops and priests went to the wilderness of Scetes. They assembled in the church with the elders of Scetes. They remained there for many days, searching and scouting for who would be best for this position. Finally they unanimously agreed to choose this father for what was known of his good character and excellent attributes. They took him and bound him against his will, and he cried out and begged them with excuses to release him saying, "I am not fit to be raised to the dignity of the Papacy." They brought him bound to the city of Alexandria and ordained him Patriarch. The deed of his appointment was read in The Church of the Holy Virgin in the Greek], Coptic, and Arabic languages.

During his papacy, he added to his worship and piety. He taught and preached the people daily. He gave alms and did works of mercy to the poor and needy. During his papacy he never asked for any of the Church's money, but rather, he used to give a large portion of the contributions which he received to be spent on different righteous deeds. He completed 27 years in the papacy and departed in peace.

Religious titles
Preceded by Michael IV	Coptic Pope; 1102–1128	Succeeded by Gabriel II
