= Saint Colluthus =

Egyptian martyr and saint

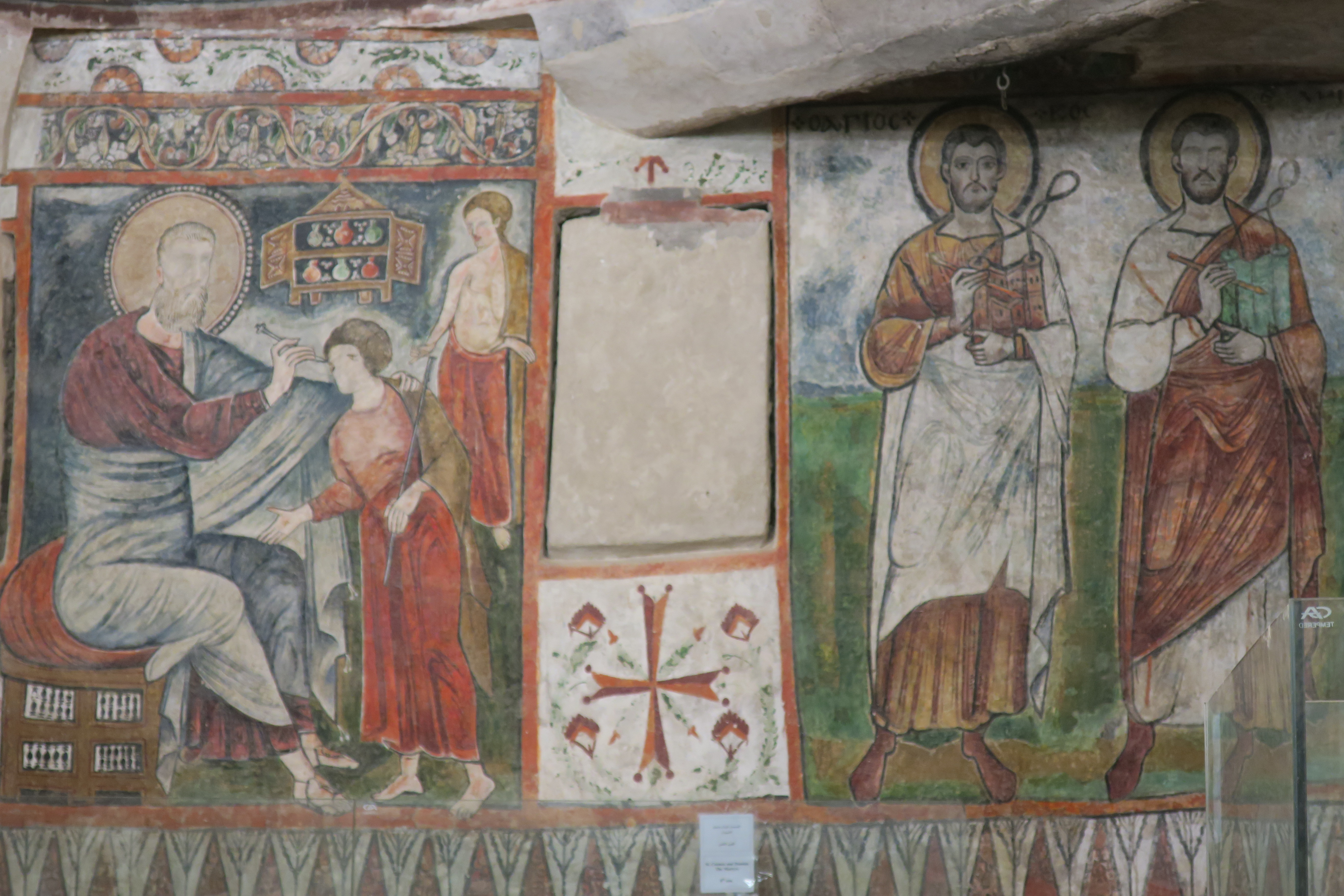
- Mural from a Syrian monastery depicting Saint Colluthus

Holy Unmercenary
- Born: 3rd Century AD; Antinopolis, Aegyptus, Roman Empire
- Died: 3rd Century AD; Antinopolis, Aegyptus, Roman Empire
- Honored in: Coptic Church, Coptic Catholic Church
- Feast: 24 Pashons (Coptic), 18 January (Eastern Catholic)
- Patronage: Physicians

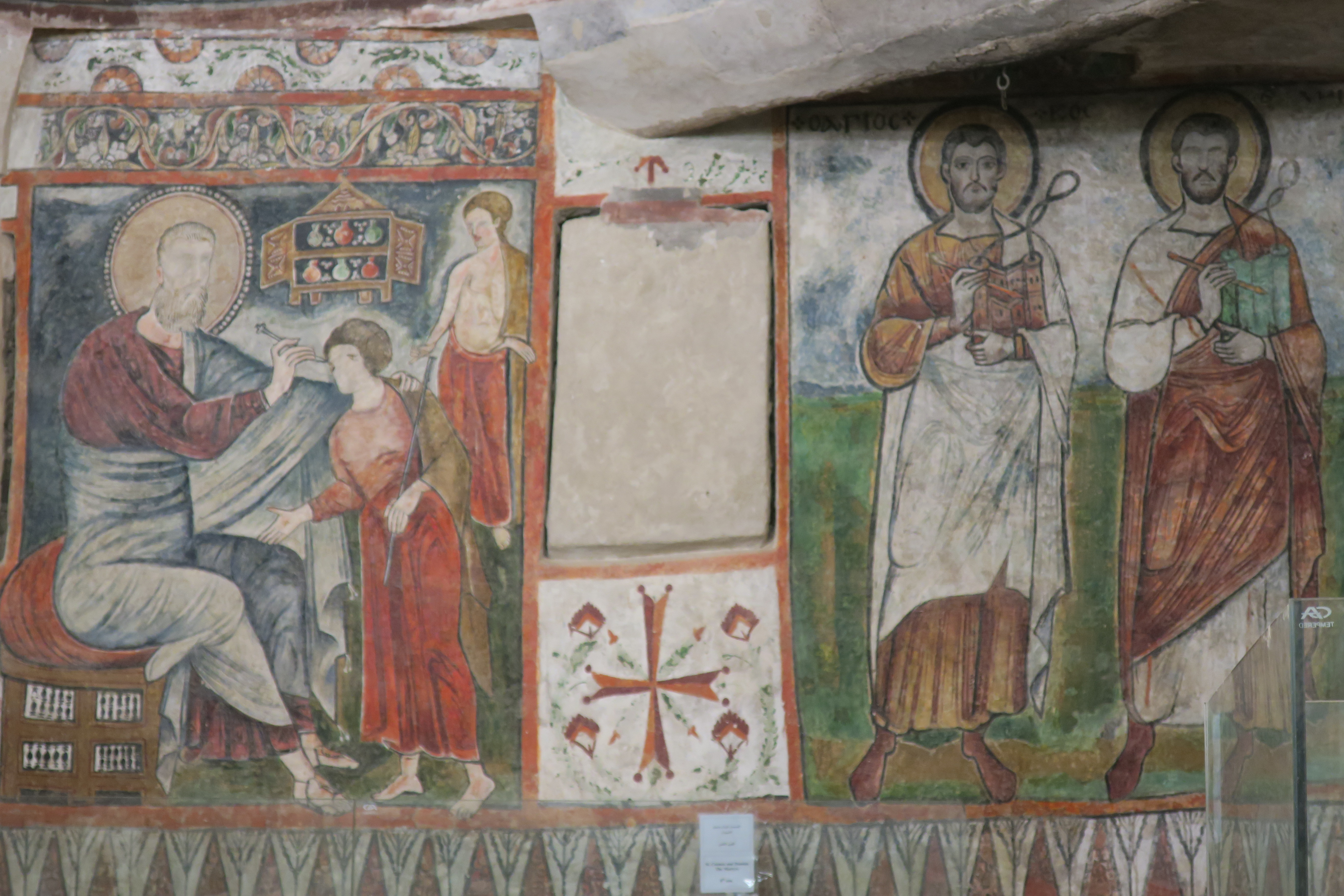
Mural of the Syrian monastery depicting Saint Colluthus

Saint Colluthus (also known as Abū Qultah or Saint Kolta) is a Coptic saint and martyr of the 3rd century AD said to be from the Upper Egyptian city of Ansena (Antinoöpolis). His martyrdom is part of the Synaxarion of the Coptic Church.

== Hagiographical Life ==
According to his Hagiography, Colluthus' father was the governor of Antinoöpolis. His parents were both Christians. He lived a celibate life, although his sister was married to Arianus, who became governor of Antinoöpolis after the departure of Colluthus' father.

Colluthus was a physician who did not charge money for his services. When Roman emperor Diocletian began his persecution of the Christians, Arianus apostatized in order to keep his position as a governor. When Colluthus rebuked Arianus for persecuting the Christians, Arianus sent him to the governor of Oxyrhynchus who threw him in prison for three years. Colluthus' sister unsuccessfully mediated for his release. After three years, a different governor of Oxyrhynchus took Colluthus out of prison, tortured him, and eventually cut his head off on 24 Pashons. His feast day is 24 Pashons in the Coptic Church, and 18 January in the Coptic Catholic Church.

== The Shrine at Antinopolis ==
Antinoupolis was an important regional centre throughout the Late Antique period. A christian community there is recorded in Eusebius existing between 220-250. After the persecution of Diocletian ended in 311, a bishopric is recorded at Antinopolis as early as 325, and may well be earlier. A shrine at Antinoupolis to St Colluthus is first recorded in the Lausiac History of Palladius, ca. 420, and archaeological traces confirm a 5th century date.

== Hagiographical Material ==
The Martyrdom or Acts of St Colluthus exists in at least two recensions.

The first recension contains what appears to be the actual transcript of a court hearing. This is very sober in tone, and it lacks any mention of miracles. It seems to have been originally written in Greek, and the Coptic text is a translation.

This recension is preserved among the Coptic Codices in the Pierpont Morgan Library in New York. These all came from the 1910 discovery of the library of the monastery of St Michael the Archangel near Sopehes (modern Hamuli) in the Fayum. This has been printed with an English translation.

A second recension, more legendary in character, exists which is derived from the first.

A Coptic fragment of the second recension of the Acts of St Colluthus was one of the first parchments from the White Monastery at Sohag to reach Europe, and this was printed in 1781, together with other material about Colluthus from Greek and Armenian sources.

Two "encomiums" exist. The first encomium on St Colluthus, attributed to Isaac of Antinopolis/Antinoe, has been printed. Another encomium exists by Phoibammon of Shmin on Colluthus.

All the texts have all been edited recently,by Gesa Schenke. This includes a critical edition of the Coptic texts, and a German translation.

== Sources ==
- The Acts of St Colluthus, first version - English translation
- The Acts of St Colluthus, second version - English translation
- The Encomium of Phoebammon on St Colluthus
- Coptic Synexarion
