= Pope Cyril II of Alexandria =

Head of the Coptic Church from 1078 to 1092

Saint Cyril II of Alexandria
- Pope of Alexandria and Patriarch of the See of St. Mark
- Papacy began: 18 March 1078
- Papacy ended: 6 June 1092
- Predecessor: Christodoulos
- Successor: Michael IV

Personal details
- Born: Egypt
- Died: 6 June 1092 Egypt
- Buried: Monastery of Saint Macarius the Great
- Denomination: Coptic Orthodox Christian
- Residence: The Hanging Church

Sainthood
- Feast day: 6 June (12 Paoni in the Coptic calendar)

Pope Cyril II of Alexandria is the 67th Pope of Alexandria and Patriarch of the See of St. Mark.

There had been a leadership dispute upon the selection of Cyril II as patriarch of Alexandria. A council of forty-seven bishops was assembled to depose him, supported by a Muslim overseer of an orchard called Yaseeb. According to his hagiography, the Pope told the overseer 'If the Governor has authority, Christ has authority over the heaven and earth', then dismounted his horse and made a matonia before him. Because of the Pope's words, it is claimed, the governor became enraged with the overseer, and beheaded him at the same place and at the same time as the matonia had been performed. This supposedly prevented a split in the church, and Cyril II and the dissenting bishops were reconciled.

Although the patriarchate of Alexandria always resided in the city of Alexandria since its foundation by Mark the Evangelist in the first century, it became increasingly inconvenient for the popes of Alexandria to be far from the newly founded capital in Cairo. Cyril II moved the seat of the patriarchate to the Hanging Church in Cairo in the eleventh century.

Patriarch Cyril attempted to ordain a properly consecrated bishop to be the new Abuna of the Ethiopian Orthodox Church, but Badr al-Jamali, the Vizier of Caliph Al-Mustansir, forced him to ordain instead Abuna Sawiros. Although at first warmly welcomed when he reached Ethiopia, the Caliph's candidate began to openly favor Islam in that Christian country by building seven mosques, ostensibly for the use of Muslim traders. This led to a general uproar in Ethiopia. Abuna Sawiros justified his acts by saying a refusal to build these mosques would result in a persecution in Egypt. Nevertheless, the Abuna was imprisoned, the seven mosques destroyed, and restrictions placed on the Muslim traders. Reciprocal acts followed in Egypt, and a rupture in the relations between the two countries.

Pope Cyril II died on 12 Paoni 808 A.M. (6 June 1092 A.D.).

== Notes ==
Preceded by Christodolos	Coptic Pope; 1078–1092	Succeeded by Michael IV
