= Otimus =

Egyptian martyr and saint

Otimus is a 3rd-century Egyptian martyr and saint. Otimus was born in Fowwa, and later became its priest. After some time, he moved to the mountain of Ansena. When Emperor Diocletian incited his persecution against the Christians, Arianus the governor of Ansena called for Otimus and ordered him to worship the idols. When Otimus refused, Arianus tortured him and eventually ordered that he be burned on 3 Pashons. The relics of Otimus are believed to be in the city of Kalabsha.
