= Firmilian (Roman governor) =

Firmilianus was the Roman governor of the Iudaea Province, during the third Late Roman Period of the Roman rule over the region. He was the third of a succession of governors (Flavianus, Urbanus, and Firmilian) who enforced the Diocletian Persecution at Caesarea, the province's capital, which lasted for twelve years. He is commonly referred as cruel and sadistic for torturing and killing many Christians and being heartless even to his close allies. He was beheaded for his crimes around 310 AD, by the emperor Maximinus’s order, as his predecessor Urbanus had been two years before.

== See also ==
- Saint Arianus
