= Pope Gabriel II of Alexandria =

Head of the Coptic Church from 1131 to 1145

- Pope of Alexandria and Patriarch of the See of St. Mark
- Papacy began: 3 February 1131
- Papacy ended: 5 April 1145
- Predecessor: Macarius II
- Successor: Michael V

Personal details
- Born: Cairo, Egypt
- Died: 5 April 1145 Egypt
- Buried: Monastery of Saint Macarius the Great
- Denomination: Coptic Orthodox Christian
- Residence: The Hanging Church

Pope Gabriel II of Alexandria, 70th Pope of Alexandria and Patriarch of the See of St. Mark. He is commemorated in the Coptic Synaxarion on the 10th day of Parmouti.

This Pope was from the nobles of Cairo, and was a writer, scribe, and scholar. He transcribed many Arabic and Coptic books. The elders of the people and the clergy chose him for the Patriarchal Chair, and his enthronement was on the 9th day of Amshir, 847 A.M. (February 3., 1131 A.D.).

When the Caliph was asked by the Emperor of Ethiopia to appoint more bishops to his kingdom, Gabriel showed the Caliph that if that country had more than seven bishops, the Ethiopian Orthodox Church would be able, by Canon law, to select their own Abun or metropolitan bishop, thus curtailing the influence the Patriarch, and thus the Caliph, had over Ethiopia. Thus, the Emperor's request was declined.

Religious titles
Preceded by Macarius II	Coptic Pope; 1131–1145	Succeeded by Michael V
