= Master Malati =

Coptic Orthodox martyr and saint

Saint Master Malati
- Died: May 19, 1803
- Venerated in: Coptic Orthodox Church

Master Malati or Moallem Malati (died May 19, 1803) was a martyr and saint of the Coptic Orthodox church.

Malati was a scribe of Ayyoub Bey el-Defterdar, one of the Mamluks of Muhammad Bey Abu al-Dhahab. When the French under Napoléon Bonaparte occupied Egypt, they formed a department to look after national problems, and, with the consent of the Christian and Moslem members of this department, they made Malati its general manager.

After the French left Egypt, Master Gergis El-Gohary, Master Wasef, and Master Malati were protected by the rulers of Egypt. In a disturbance at the time of Tahir Pasha, the acting Ottoman governor of Egypt, Malati was arrested. His head was cut off at Bab Zoweila in Cairo on 12 Pashons 1519 A.M. (May 19, 1803 AD). He was subsequently canonized by the Coptic Orthodox Church.
