= Tanda, Egypt =

Tanta تندة
- Town
- Location in Egypt
- Coordinates: 27°40′45″N 30°46′21″E
- Country: Egypt
- Governorate: Minya
- Time zone: UTC+2 (EET)
  - Summer (DST): UTC+3 (EEST)

Tanda (Arabic: تندة) is a town in Mallawi the Minya Governorate of Egypt. It is located near Mallawi. Tanda is located near the Nile River.

== Notable people from Tanta ==
- Saint Dasya
