= Abāmūn of Tukh =

Coptic martyr

Abāmūn of Toukh

Martyr
- Born: 4th century Toukh, Egypt
- Died: 4th century Ansena, Egypt
- Venerated in: Coptic Orthodox Church; Oriental Orthodox Churches
- Feast: 20 July (13 Abib)

Abāmūn of Toukh is a Coptic martyr known only from a mention of him in the Synaxarion of Mikhail of Atrib. His feast day is 20 July (13 Abib).

== Biography ==
He was from Toukh in the diocese of Banha. He is said to have been visited by the archangel Michael, who told Abāmūn that he would be martyred at Ansena. Abamun traveled to Ansena, There he was tortured by the governor Eukhious by a variety of means, including the rack, fire, red-hot irons, flogging, flaying, and the furnace before he was finally beheaded. He is also said to have worked a number of miracles.

After his execution, another Christian, Julius of Aqfahs, wrapped the body in cloths and had it carried back to his homeland, Toukh. Vagaries of translation have led some to believe that Mikhail went on to imply that Abāmūn's body had been taken there immediately, although other translators have made it clear that the intended meaning was more likely that the body was moved from Toukh sometime in the thirteenth century.

== Veneration ==
Abu al-Makarim records that in the thirteenth century there was a church dedicated to Abamūn (note the spelling difference) at El-Bahnasa. He went on to say that he himself was not sure whether the church was dedicated to Abāmūn of Ṭoukh or his namesake Abāmūn of Tarnūt.

The evidence available makes it seem more likely that it was named after Abāmūn of Ṭoukh, for several reasons. One is that Julius of Aqfahs personally took care of this martyr's body, but not the other's. Another is that Mikhail specifically mentions that this Abāmūn was at the time of his writing in the Said, which indicates that there was a cult extant at the time venerating this Abāmūn, but not the other. Lastly, there is the existing reference to this individual working a number of miracles, with no such reference made to any miracle by the other Abamun.
