= Deir el-Muharraq =

Monastery in Middle Egypt north of Asyut

Deir el-Muharraq Monastery of Virgin Mary in Koskam
- ⲡⲓⲙⲟⲛⲁⲥⲧⲏⲣⲓⲟⲛ ⲛ̀ⲧⲉ ϯⲑⲉⲟⲧⲟⲕⲟⲥ ⲙⲁⲣⲓⲁ ϧⲉⲛ ⲕⲟⲥⲕⲁⲙ
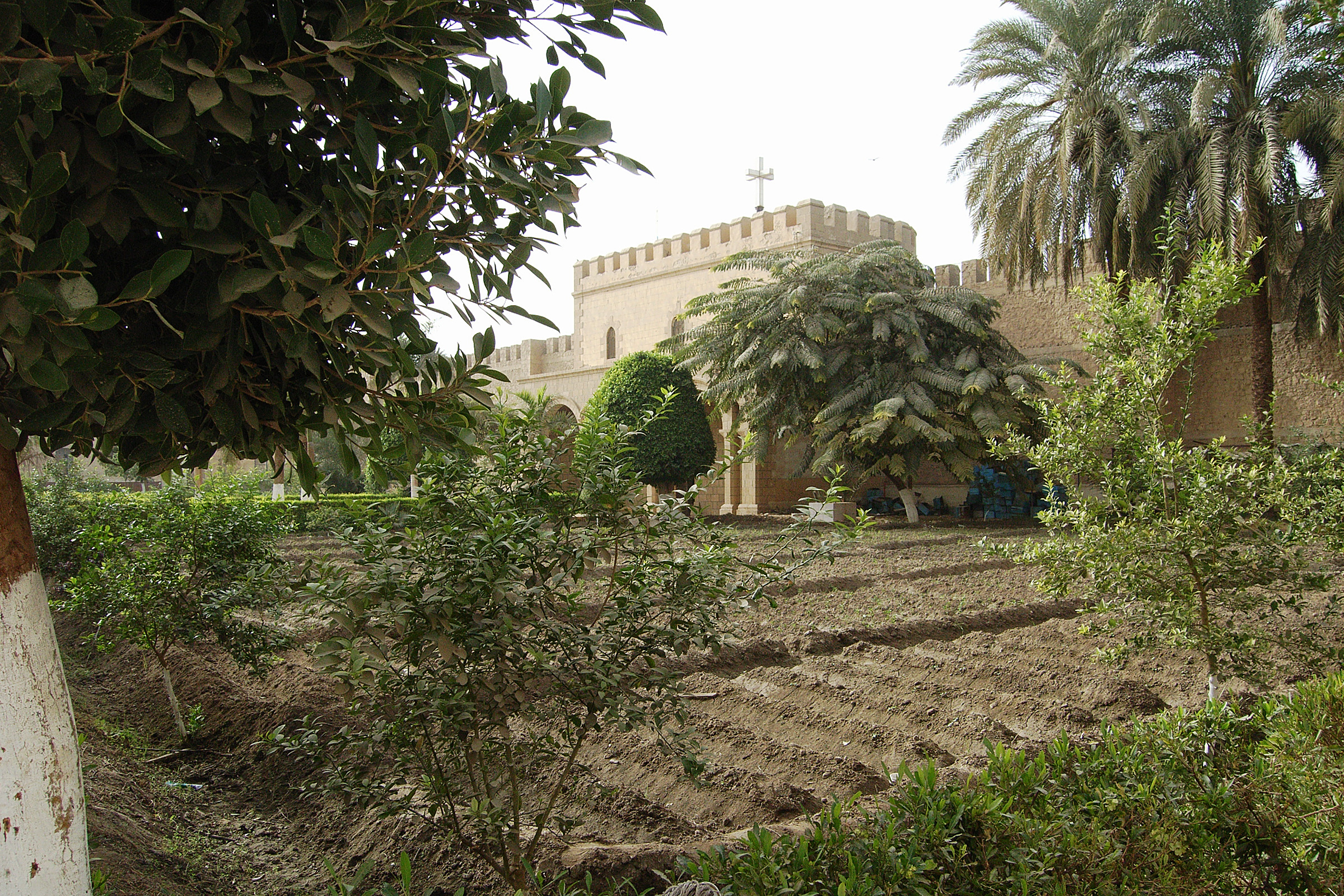
- The main gates of the monastery

- Location within Egypt

Monastery information
- Other names: ad-Deir al-Muḥarraq, Burned Monastery; Virgin Mary monastery
- Established: 4th century
- Dedication: Virgin Mary
- Diocese: Coptic Orthodox Church of Alexandria
- Controlled churches: St. George Church, Virgin Mary's Ancient Church, Holy Virgin Mary's Recent Church

People
- Founder: Holy Family in Egypt

Site
- Location: El-Qusiya, Asyut Governorate
- Country: Egypt
- Coordinates: 27.3845°N 30.7795°E
- Public access: Yes

The Monastery of Virgin Mary in Koskam (Coptic: ⲡⲓⲙⲟⲛⲁⲥⲧⲏⲣⲓⲟⲛ ⲛ̀ⲧⲉ ϯⲑⲉⲟⲧⲟⲕⲟⲥ ⲙⲁⲣⲓⲁ ϧⲉⲛ ⲕⲟⲥⲕⲁⲙ) or Deir el-Muharraq (Arabic: الدير المحرق, lit. 'burned monastery', ad-Dayr al-Muḥarraq), also known as the Muharraq Monastery, Virgin Mary monastery and Mount Koskam Monastery, is a monastic complex of the Coptic Orthodox Church of Alexandria in Egypt.

== Geography ==
The Deir el-Muharraq complex is located on the Nile just south of Cusae (Coptic: ⲕⲟⲥⲕⲁⲙ, Arabic: القوصية), in Asyut Governorate in Upper Egypt. It is south of Greater Cairo.

== Features ==
The monastery is within the Coptic Orthodox Church of Alexandria diocese, with about 100 monks of Koinonia or community monasticism in residence.

The stone fortress on Mount Koskam at Muharraq Monastery was built in the 6th or 7th century. The fortress chapel has a 12th-century lectern, dating to when the fortress was first repaired.

The monastery's library has two entities, an ancient Coptic manuscripts library and archives, and a contemporary research and reading library.

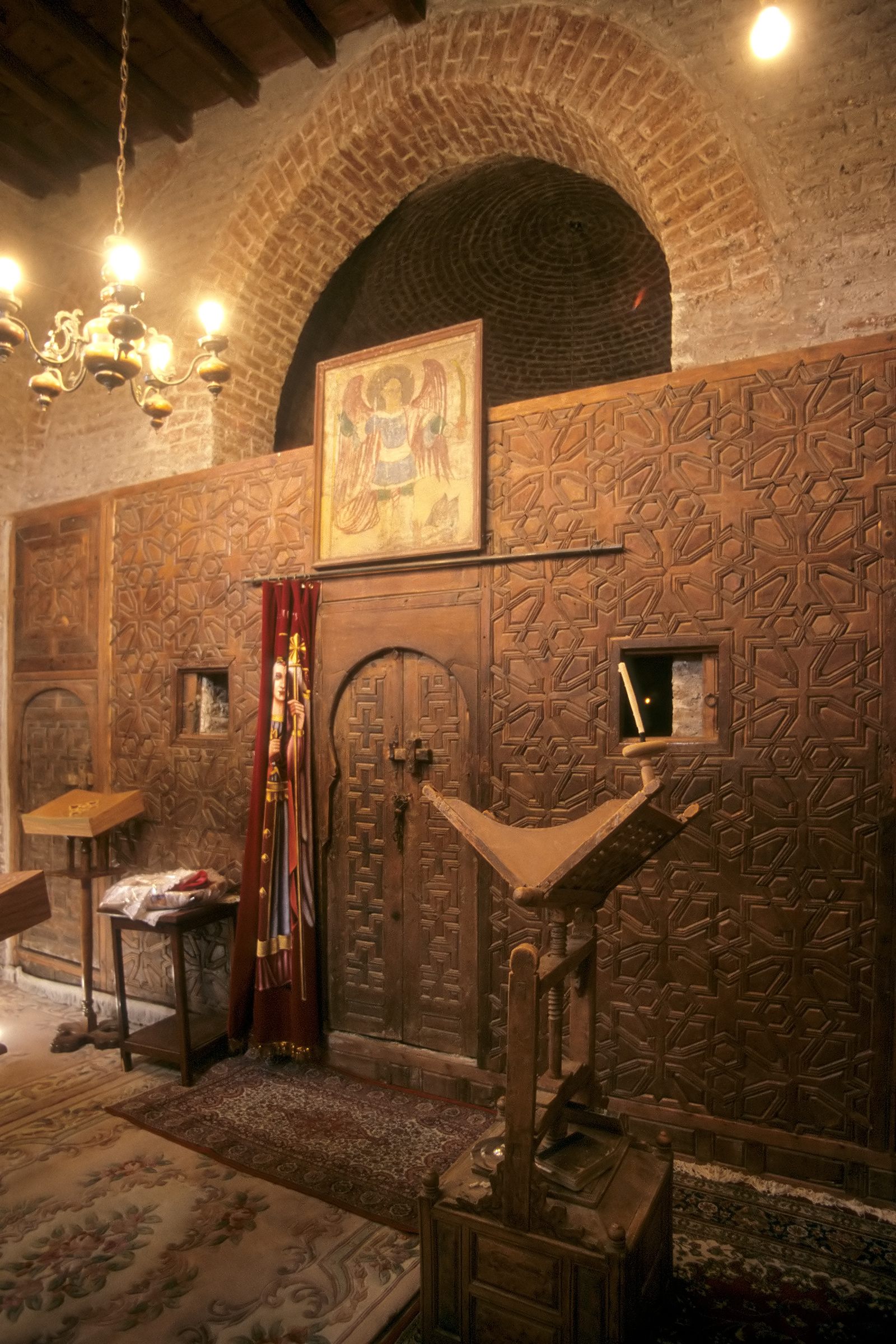
Screen of the Church of St. Michael

=== Churches ===
The monastery complex has three churches:

- 12th century Virgin Mary's Ancient Church (with 16th and 19th century domes additions),
- 19th century Neoclassical style St. George Church (1878–1880),
- Mid-20th century Holy Virgin Mary's Recent Church (1940–1964).

The Church of al-Adhra (Church of the Virgin) at the monastery was built over an ancient cave. It is claimed that Mary and Jesus spent six months and ten days here on their flight into Egypt from King Herod. The altar stone is dated 747 CE.

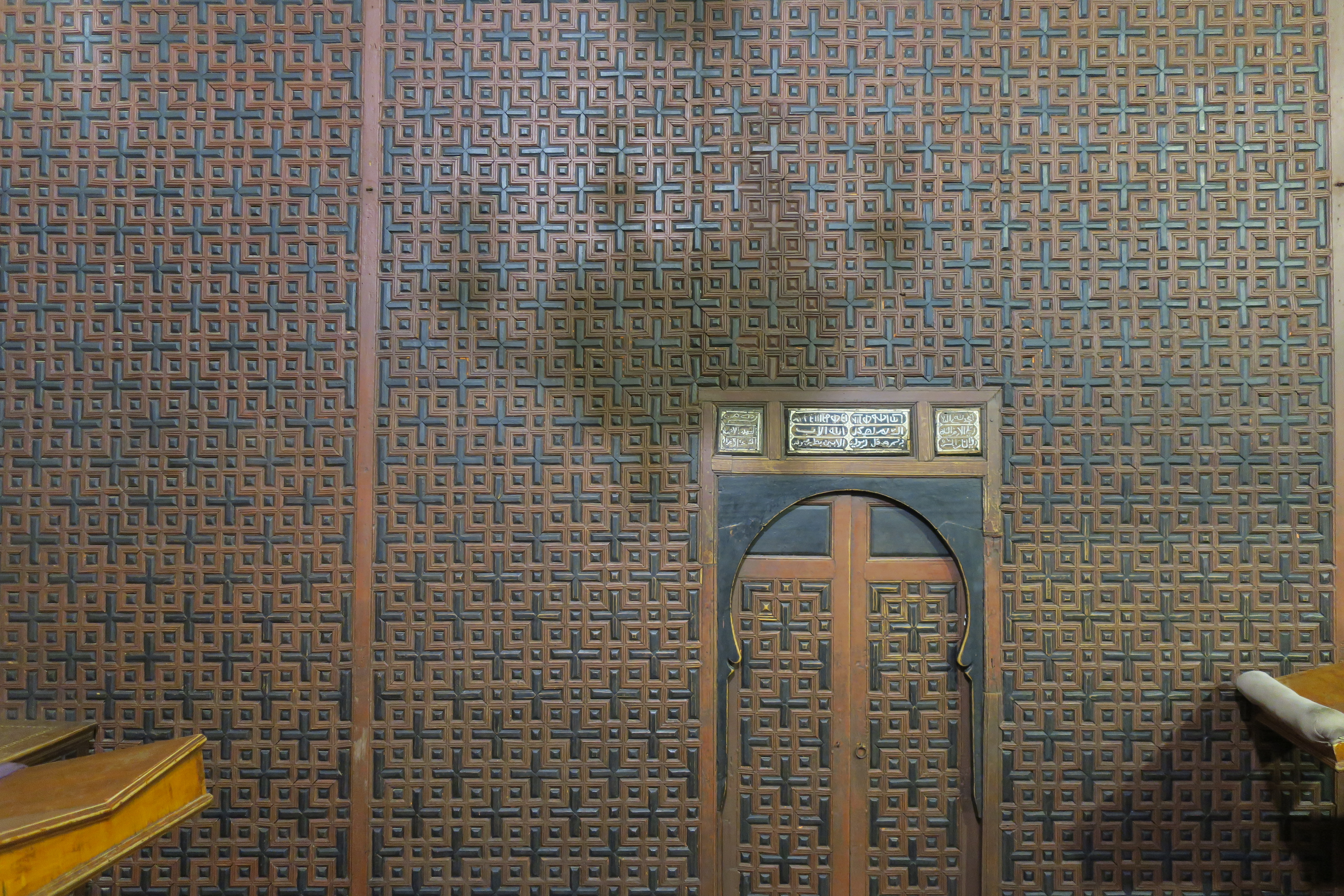
Iconstasis of the church of the virgin

The monastery served as a host for Ethiopian monks in 17th century.

Many Coptics hold this church in high veneration, believing it to be one of the first Christian churches in ancient Egypt. It was associated with a Marian visionary event claimed in the early 2000s.

== Arson of 2013 ==
In August 2013, rioters committed arson, setting fire to the Muharraq Monastery.

Its archival manuscript library holds, or held, many ancient Coptic manuscripts dating back as early as the 13th century. Another section contained a collection of thousands of modern books and reference material dating from the 19th and 20th centuries. The flames from the monastery's substantial fire reached surrounding Coptic homes in the complex, destroying 15 and damaging others. The fate of the ancient Coptic manuscripts and the monastery's 2 libraries is unknown.

== See also ==
- Coptic architecture
- Coptic Orthodox monasteries
- Christian monasteries in Egypt
- Persecution of Copts
- Early medieval domes
