= John of Senhout =

Egyptian saint from the 4th century AD

Saint John of Senhout (d. 305) is an Egyptian saint from the 4th century AD.

He was born in the Egyptian city of Senhout. His father's name was Macarius and his mother's name was Anna. According to Coptic Orthodox manuscripts, a divine inspiration encouraged him to travel to the city of Athribis to confess his Christian faith. The city's governor had him arrested, but he converted his prison guard to Christianity. The governor tortured him, then sent him to Ansena, where he was further tortured and eventually decapitated on 8 Pashons.

His body was shrouded by Julius of Akfahs, who also sent the body to Senhout, where it was placed in the city's church. Today, the saint's relics are in Shubra El Khiema, Egypt.

He is commemorated on 8 Pachans.

== Sources ==
- Coptic Synexarion
