= Pope Joseph I of Alexandria =

Head of the Coptic Church from 831 to 849

Saint Joseph I of Alexandria
- Pope of Alexandria & Patriarch of the See of St. Mark
- Papacy began: 831
- Papacy ended: 2 November 849
- Predecessor: Simeon II
- Successor: Michael II

Personal details
- Born: 771 Menouf, Egypt
- Died: 2 November 849
- Buried: Saint Mark's Church
- Denomination: Coptic Orthodox Christian
- Residence: Saint Mark's Church

Sainthood
- Feast day: 2 November

Joseph I of Alexandria (Abba Yousab), 52nd Pope of Alexandria and Patriarch of the See of St. Mark.

He was the son of one of the rich nobles of Menouf, Egypt. After his parents died, some believers raised him. As an adult, he gave most of his money as alms and went to the desert of St. Macarius the Great and became a monk. When Marcus II became the 49th Pope of Alexandria, he summoned Yousab, ordained him a priest, and sent him back. He stayed in the desert until the death of Simon II, 51st Pope.

The papal throne remained unoccupied, and Yousab was chosen as pope. He bought properties out of his own pocket, and bestowed them on the churches. Yousab condemned actions of bishops of Tanes and Miser (Cairo); they were excommunicated.

He died after 19 years in office, having been a monk for 39 years since the age of 20.

Religious titles
Preceded by Simeon II	Coptic Pope; 822–841	Succeeded by Michael II
