= Pope Mark II of Alexandria =

Head of the Coptic Church from 799 to 819

Saint Mark II of Alexandria
- Pope of Alexandria & Patriarch of the See of St. Mark
- Papacy began: 26 January 799
- Papacy ended: 17 April 819
- Predecessor: John IV
- Successor: James

Personal details
- Born: Alexandria, Egypt
- Died: 17 April 819
- Buried: Saint Mark's Church
- Denomination: Coptic Orthodox Christian
- Residence: Saint Mark's Church

Sainthood
- Feast day: 17 April (22 Baramouda in the Coptic calendar)

Mark II (died 17 April 819) was the 49th Coptic Patriarch of Alexandria from 26 January 799 until his death.

During his reign, around 810, the schismatic Barsanuphians were brought back into the Coptic fold. Mark baptized their leaders, George and Abraham, at the monastery of Saint Mina and consecrated them as orthodox bishops (albeit without dioceses). Mark later appointed George to the diocese of Tanbudha and Abraham to that of Atripe. Mark also rebuilt and reconsecrated one of the former churches of the Barsanuphians.

== Bibliography ==
- Mikhail, Maged S. A. (2014). From Byzantine to Islamic Egypt: Religion, Identity and Politics after the Arab Conquest. I. B. Tauris.
- Stewart, Randall (1991). "Barsanuphians". In Aziz Suryal Atiya (ed.). The Coptic Encyclopedia. Vol. 2. New York: Macmillan Publishers. cols. 347b–348a.
- Swanson, Mark N. (2010). The Coptic Papacy in Islamic Egypt (641–1517). American University in Cairo Press.

Preceded by John IV	Coptic Pope; 799–819	Succeeded by James
