= Abanoub =

Coptic martyr

Saint Abanoub of Nehisa
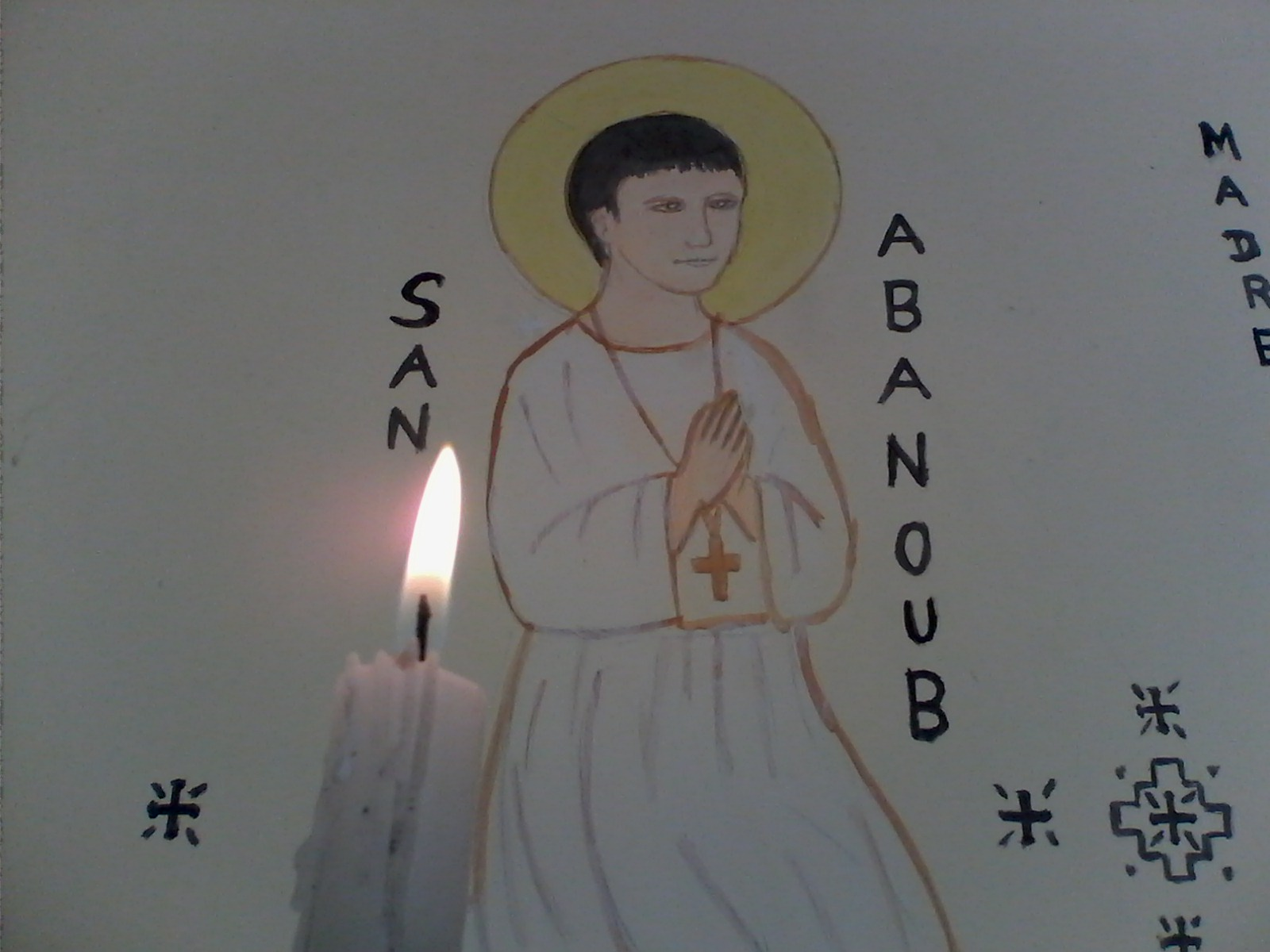
- St. Abanoub of Nehisa (or Abanoub Al-Nahisy)

Young Martyr
- Born: c. 3rd century Nehisa, Egypt
- Died: c. 4th century Alexandria, Egypt
- Venerated in: Catholic Church; Eastern Orthodox Church; Oriental Orthodoxy
- Major shrine: Virgin Mary & St. Abanoub Coptic Orthodox Church in Samanaid, Gharbia Governorate, Egypt
- Feast: July 31 (Epip 24)
- Attributes: Cross, white robe and hands in prayer.
- Patronage: Vertubian orders

Abanoub or Abanob or Abanoub Al-Nahisy (Coptic: ⲁⲛⲟⲩⲃ, also ⲁⲡⲁ ⲁⲛⲟⲩⲃ) is a 4th-century Christian saint and martyr from Egypt. His name is related to the Egyptian god Anubis. He was born in Nehisa in the Nile Delta to Christian parents. Abanoub was 12 years old when he was killed and beheaded, after being tortured for refusing to leave Christianity. His feast day is July 31 (Epip 24). His relics are preserved in St. Virgin Mary and St. Abanoub Churches in Sebennytos, Egypt. His title is often The Child Martyr.

== History ==
Abanoub was born in the city of Nehisa (Coptic: ⲛⲁⲏⲥⲓ), modern Kafr al-Abhar in the district of Talkha. He was the only son of parents who reared him in the fear of God. They died when Abanoub was a young child. At age twelve, Abanoub entered the church to hear the priest asking the congregation to remain faithful during the persecutions provoked by Diocletian, the Roman emperor. Abanoub received the Holy Sacraments, then he prayed to God to guide him to where he could confess his faith in Jesus.

He returned to his house, and straight away he rose up, and gave all the gold, silver, and apparel his father had left him to the poor and needy, then went to Samanoud, walking along the river bank. On the way, he had a vision of the Archangel Michael, who told him that he would suffer at Samanoud. He confessed the Name of the Lord Christ before Lucianus the governor. Abanoub also insulted Lucianus's idols such that the governor ruler became furious and gave orders that the child be whipped. The soldiers beat Abanoub severely, but the Archangel Michael miraculously healed him.

On the following day, the governor took Abanoub on a boat to a city called Athribis, and as a form of punishment, Abanoub was hung upside down from the mast. The soldiers, along with their ruler, began to drink and dance, while hitting Abanoub on the mouth. Abanoub's nose bled, but then, unexpectedly, the soldiers became blind and the ruler paralyzed. The soldiers cried to Abanoub to pray for them and promised to become Christians. Abanoub replied, "This will only happen in Athribis, so that everyone there should know that there is no other God but Christ". The angel of the Lord came down from heaven, released Abanoub, and wiped up the blood that was running down from his nose and mouth. Strong winds brought them swiftly to Athribis. When they arrived in Athribis, the soldiers were healed, and they cast their uniforms in front of the ruler of Athribis. The governor became infuriated and ordered that they all be killed. The governor of Athribis tortured Abanoub severely, then sent him to the city of Alexandria. There he was tortured until he delivered up his soul and received the crown of martyrdom. St. Julius El-Akfahsi, who wrote the biography of St. Abanoub, was present. He took Abanoub's body and sent it with some of his men to Abanoub's hometown, Nehisa.

== Veneration ==
In 960 AD, St. Abanoub's body was transferred to St. Virgin Mary Church in Samanoud. Many churches were built in his name. Many signs and miracles were manifested from his body which is now located in his church in the city of Samanoud. His feast day is July 31 (Epip 24).
