= Isaac of Dafra =

Egyptian martyr and saint

Isaac of Dafra (Note: The town is also spelled in most sources as Tiphre and Dephri which is a transliteration of ϯⲫⲣⲉ or ϯⲫⲣⲏ.) is an Egyptian martyr and saint.

== Background ==
Isaac was born in Dafra, near the modern city of Tanta. According to Coptic manuscripts, an angel encouraged him to travel to the town of Towa, near Beba in the Bani Suwayf Governorate, to profess that he is of Christian faith in front of the governor and to receive martyrdom.

== Torture and miracles ==
The governor had Isaac sent to his house under guard for torture, but while en route a blind man begged Isaac for help, whom he blessed and immediately the blind man could see. The guard moved Isaac onto the governors house, where upon arrival the guard admitted that he too now believed in Christ. The guard would be executed.

After being severely tortured Isaac was then sent to Oxyrhynchus for further torture and, eventually, execution. While being transported by boat Isaac begged a man with a blind and closed eye for water. Upon receiving the water he threw a few drops upon the blind man's closed eye, after which he could see again.

== Death ==
After his arrival and further torture it is said that the inhabitants of the city of Behnesa came and begged for Isaac to be killed swiftly or released as many auspicious events had happened around his arrival. He was beheaded quickly. Some Christians returned Isaac's body to his town of Dafra, where a church was later built after him. Many miracles that happened around the church were attributed to him.

The feast day of Saint Isaac of Defra is on 6 Pashons in and around the month of May.
