= Epimachus of Pelusium =

Egyptian martyr

Saint Epimachus of Pelusium
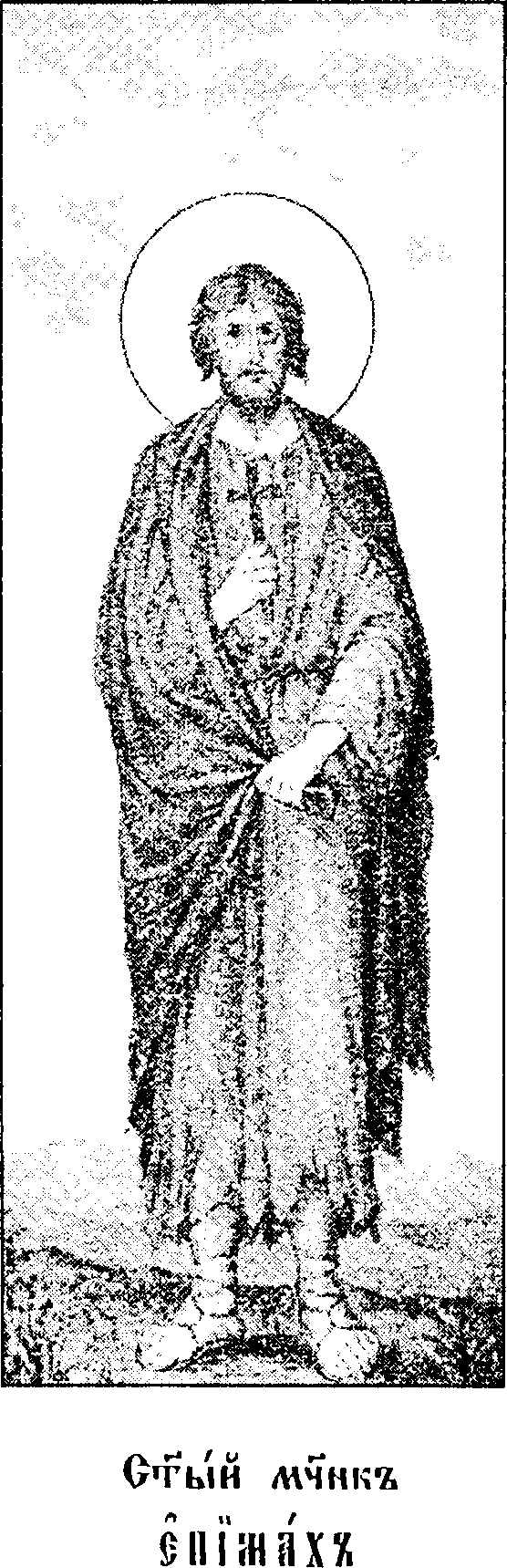

Martyr
- Born: unknown Pelusium (Farma), Egypt
- Died: unknown El-Bakroug (near Demera), Egypt
- Venerated in: Coptic Orthodox Church; Eastern Orthodox Church
- Feast: 14 Pashons (Coptic Orthodox Church); 31 October (Eastern Orthodox Church)

Epimachus of Pelusium was an Egyptian martyr.

== Narrative ==
Epimachus lived an ascetical life on Mount Pelusium. To support himself, he worked as a weaver along with his two companions: Theodore and Callinicos. At age 27, he heard that Polemius the governor of Egypt was torturing Christians. He subsequently went to El-Bakroug, (near Demera) and destroying some pagan idols, declared that he too was a Christian.

Apellianos, the eparch of Alexandria had Epimarchus tortured severely on the wheel. A drop of his blood splashed on the eyes of a blind maiden, and she was able to see instantaneously. The maiden and her family converted to Christianity and were also martyred. Furious, the governor ordered Epimachus beheaded with a sword.

A deaf and mute soldier touched the body, and he instantly heard and spoke. Some of the Christians from the city of Edku took the body and several signs and wonders took place from it. His kinsfolk from Demera carried the body to El-Barmoun (Coptic: ⲡⲁⲣⲁⲙⲟⲛⲓ) with great honor. The governor had the body wrapped in expensive shrouds and built a church after named after Epimachus, where the body was placed.

The feast of Saint Epimachus of Pelusium falls on 14 Pashons in the Coptic Orthodox Church, and on 31 October in the Eastern Orthodox Church.
