= Sarah the Martyr =

Christian saint (died c. 303)

Saint Sarah

Martyr
- Born: 3rd century Antioch
- Died: c. 303; Antioch
- Venerated in: Coptic Orthodoxy
- Feast: 3 May

Sarah (died c. 303) is a 4th-century martyr venerated as a saint in the Coptic Orthodox Church. She is commemorated on the 25th day of Baramouda (3 May).

Unable to baptise her two sons in Antioch on account of the persecutions of the Emperor Diocletian, she took them by boat to Egypt. A great storm blew up, and in fear of her sons drowning unbaptised, she performed their baptisms herself, cutting her breast, marking the cross on their foreheads and over their hearts in her blood, and dipping them three times in the sea, in the name of the Father, Son, and Holy Spirit. The storm died down, and the ship reached Alexandria. Sarah immediately took her sons to Pope Peter I for official baptism, but when he went to baptise them, the water froze. He continued baptising other children and came again to Sarah's children at the end, but three times he tried, and three times the water froze, whereupon he said, "It is indeed one baptism."

On returning to Antioch, she was accused by her husband of having gone to Alexandria to commit adultery with Christians, and sent before the Emperor, but refused to confess, or reveal her true purpose (which probably would have resulted in death anyway). She and her two sons were burned. The year was probably AD 303 or 304.
