= Saint Theoclia =

Egyptian martyr and saint

Saint Theoclia is an Egyptian martyr and saint from the 4th century AD.

Saint Theoclia was the wife of Saint Justus. They were separated at Alexandria, at which point Saint Justus was sent to Ansena where he was eventually martyred, while Saint Theoclia was sent to Sa El Hagar. The governor of the city attempted to persuade her to renounce Christianity, but she refused. She was subsequently beaten until her flesh was torn, and then placed in prison. Her hagiography states that an angel appeared to her in prison, comforted her, and healed her wounds; many prisoners who witnessed this miracle became Christian and were later martyred.

Saint Theoclia was eventually beheaded on 11 Pashons.

Her feast day is 11 Pachans. Her husband is commemorated on 10 Amshir.
