= Saint Philotheos =

Coptic Orthodox martyr and saint

Saint Philotheos (died 5 May 1380) was a Coptic Orthodox martyr and saint.

Philotheos was born in Durunka, in the province of Assiut. He was tortured by the Muslims in an attempt to force him to renounce Christianity and embrace Islam. He refused and was eventually martyred on 2 Pashons, 1096 A.M. (5 May 1380)
