= Pope Michael IV of Alexandria =

Head of the Coptic Church from 1092 to 1102

- Pope of Alexandria and Patriarch of the See of St. Mark
- Papacy began: 9 October 1092
- Papacy ended: 25 May 1102
- Predecessor: Cyril II
- Successor: Macarius II

Personal details
- Born: Egypt
- Died: 25 May 1102 Egypt
- Buried: Monastery of Saint Macarius the Great
- Denomination: Coptic Orthodox Christian
- Residence: The Hanging Church

Pope Michael IV of Alexandria, also known as Khail IV, 68th Pope of Alexandria and Patriarch of the See of St. Mark.

He was initially a monk at the Monastery of Saint Macarius the Great in Scetes. He later went to a place near Singar, where he lived in a cave for more than 20 years. On 12 Paopi, 809 A.M. (9 October 1092 AD), he was ordained Pope of Alexandria. He was known for his love of the poor and needy, and for spending the church money on paying the Jizya for those Copts who could not afford to pay it, so that they could keep their Christianity.

The Arabic historian al-Makin is quoted by later historians as recounting that Pope Michael IV made a journey to Ethiopia to ask that country's Emperor to allow the Nile to flood to its normal levels, which would end the current famine. Trimingham dismisses this as only a legend.

Michael IV departed on 30 Pashons, 818 A.M. (25 May 1102 AD) He remained on the Throne of Saint Mark for 9 years, 7 months, and 17 days.

== Notes ==
Preceded by Cyril II	Coptic Pope; 1092–1102	Succeeded by Macarius II
