= Saint Arianus =

Governor of Ansena

Martyr
- Died: AD 305
- Venerated in: Eastern Orthodox Church; Oriental Orthodox Churches; Roman Catholic Church
- Feast: 14 December (Eastern Orthodox Church); 8 Paremhat (17 March) (Oriental Orthodox Churches); 8 March (Roman Catholic Church)

Arianus was a historically attested governor of Ansena in Egypt (or in some sources a prefect of the Thebaid) and a notable figure in the Diocletianic persecution. He is a recurring character in Coptic hagiography, wherein he often attempts to torture Christian martyrs into worshiping idols, gets frustrated with their resilience and has them beheaded. In these hagiographies he is depicted with a sadistic fondness for torture, employing various methods such as beating, combing, nailing, burning, imprisoning, crucifying, and spearing Christians. He would later convert to Christianity and be executed.

== Conversion and martyrdom ==
It is said that, when his own musician Apollonius confessed his Christianity, Arianus ordered him to be shot with arrows. He died, but one of the arrows struck Arianus's eye and destroyed it. A Christian instructed Arianus to take some of Apollonius’ blood and smear it into his eye. He did so and immediately regained his sight, whereupon he converted to the Christian faith and repented of his severe persecution of Christianity. When Diocletian heard of it, he questioned Arianus about having forsaken paganism. Arianus told him of the miracles he had seen the martyrs perform, enraging the Emperor who had him tortured and then buried alive in a pit. An angel brought him out of the pit and led him to the Emperor's bed. When Diocletian woke up and recognised Arianus, he was terrified and had him placed in a hair sack then thrown into the sea, where he drowned. He was buried in Ansena alongside Philemon and Apollonius.

== See also ==
- Firmilian (Roman governor)
