= Abaskhiron the Soldier =

Martyr and Coptic saint from Egypt

Saint Abaskhiron and Companions
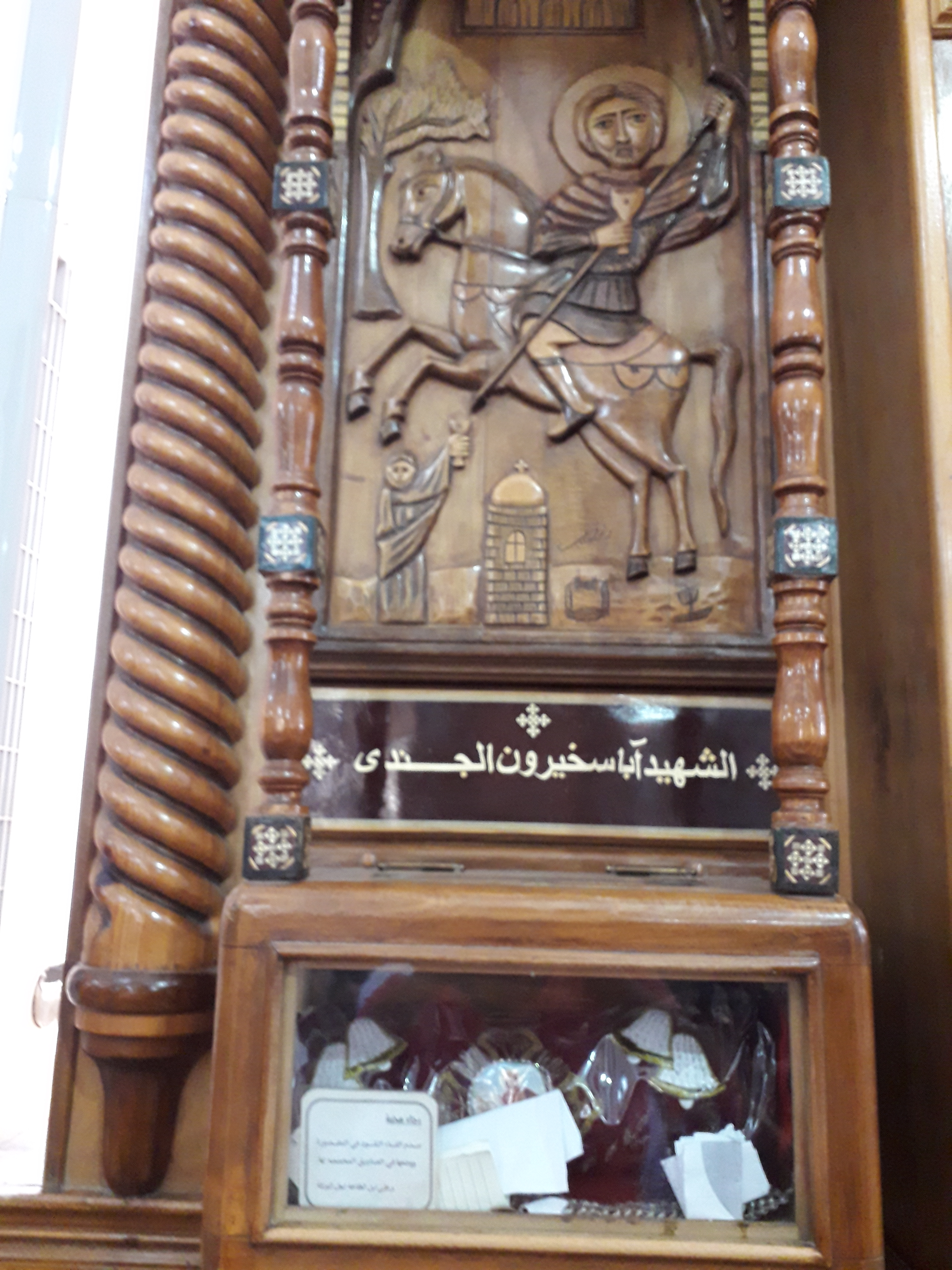
- Monastery of Saint Abraam

Martyr
- Born: 3rd century Qallin, Egypt
- Died: 3rd century Asyut, Egypt
- Venerated in: Oriental Orthodox Churches
- Feast: 14 June (7 Paoni)

Abaskhiron the Soldier or Eskhayron the Soldier is a Coptic martyr and saint of Egypt. The name "Abaskhyron" is derived from two words, The honorific title "Abba" which means father, is given to him out of respect (despite his young age in martyrdom). The second part of the name, "skhyron", sometimes "eshseros", "eskaros", means the strong.

== Biography ==
Abaskhiron was from the city of Qallin, a governorate of Kafr el Sheikh. He was one of the soldiers of Arianus, governor of Ansena. When the Edict of Diocletian to worship the idols was issued, Abaskhiron arose among the people present, and refused to worship the idols. The governor became furious and struck him on his mouth. Immediately Abaskhiron stepped up and took off his soldier's uniform and threw it on the ground, in front of the governor. This stirred the governor's anger even more and he ordered that Abaskhiron be thrown in the dungeon, a place with a suffocating atmosphere and awful odor, where Christians were brutally tortured. Abaskhiron stayed in prison, which was in the palace of the governor, in Asyut, courageously and fearlessly ready to endure any pain. Five other soldiers agreed with Abaskhiron to shed their blood in the name of Christ. Their names were: Alfius, Armanius, Arkias, Peter, and Cranius. The governor crucified some and cut off the heads of the others.

As for Abaskhiron, the governor tortured him with different kinds of tortures, but the Lord comforted him, strengthened him, and healed his wounds. The governor ordered the greatest sorcerer, Alexander, to prepare poison to kill him. Alexandros took out a snake and started to recite satanic verses until the snake split open in two pieces in front of everybody. Then he took the snake's poison and parts of his belly, put it in a cup and began to recite the same satanic names and language again. Abaskhiron took the poison, made the sign of the cross over it, and drank it in the name of Jesus of Nazareth while the sorcerer was calling on Satan: no harm came upon Abaskhiron. The sorcerer marveled, and he believed in the God of Abaskhiron. The governor cut off the head of the sorcerer, and he received the crown of martyrdom. The governor became more enraged and tortured Abaskhiron extensively, throwing him in the furnace and blinding his eyes, but the Lord sent his Archangel Michael, who drew his wings over Abaskhiron's eyes and healed him. - this is a theological account of what may have happened. Lastly Abaskhiron was beheaded and received the crown of martyrdom.

== Miracle of moving the Church of St. Abaskhiron ==
In Abaskhiron's hometown of Qallin (in the north of Egypt), the believers had a tradition where they celebrated group weddings for their sons and daughters. While they were together celebrating their weddings in St. Abaskhiron's Church in Qallin, some evildoers surrounded the church planning to kill everyone inside. The congregation asked for the intercession of St. Abaskhiron, who miraculously transported the entire church with its people, a tree and the well to another village called Biho (in the south of Egypt), which is where the church exists today.

== Veneration ==
His relics are kept in the Monastery of Saint Pishoy and the Monastery of Saint Samuel the Confessor. His feast day is 14 June (7 Paoni).
