= Pishoy =

Egyptian desert father

Saint Bishoy

Bishoy, Star of the Desert, Beloved of our Good Savior
- Born: 320; Shansa, Egypt
- Died: 15 July 417; Mountain of Ansena, Egypt
- Venerated in: Eastern Orthodox Churches; Eastern Catholic Church; Oriental Orthodox Churches; Church of the East
- Major shrine: Monastery of Saint Bishoy; Scetes, Egypt
- Feast: (Coptic Orthodox Church) and Eastern Catholic Church; 19 June Eastern Orthodox
- Attributes: Monk carrying Jesus, Monk washing the feet of Jesus

Pshoi, Paisius the Great, as he has been known in Europe since the 5th century AD, Bishoy, Bishūy, Bishāy or Bishiyyah, as his name is pronounced in Arabic (Coptic: Ⲁⲃⲃⲁ Ⲡⲓϣⲱⲓ or more rarely Ⲡⲓϣⲱⲓ Abba Pšoi / Pišoi; Greek: Ὅσιος Παΐσιος ὁ Μέγας; 320 – 417 AD), known in the Coptic Orthodox Church of Alexandria as the Star of the Desert and the Beloved of our Good Savior, was a Coptic Desert Father. He is said to have seen Jesus, and been bodily preserved to the present day via incorruptibility at the Monastery of Saint Bishoy in the Nitrian Desert, Egypt. He is venerated by the Oriental Orthodox Churches and the Eastern Orthodox Church, and is known in the latter under the Greek version of his name, Paisios.

== Life ==
Bishoy was born in 320 AD in the village of Shansa (Shensha or Shesna), currently in the Egyptian governorate of Al Minufiyah. Younger to six other brothers, he was weak and frail. His mother saw an angel in a vision asking her to give God one of her children, and pointed at Bishoy. When the mother tried to offer one of her stronger children, the angel insisted that Bishoy was the chosen one.

At the age of twenty, Bishoy went to the wilderness of Scetes and became a monk by the hand of Pambo, who also ordained John the Dwarf a monk. When Pambo died, Bishoy was guided by an angel to the site of the present Monastery of Saint Bishoy, where he lived the life of a hermit. At this time, he became the spiritual father of many monks who gathered around him. He was famous for his love, wisdom, simplicity and kindness, as well as for his extremely ascetic life. He was also known to love seclusion and quietness. Bishoy's asceticism was harsh to the extent of tying his hair and hands with a rope to the ceiling of his cell, in order to resist sleeping during his night prayers. This asceticism made him so famous that he was visited by Ephrem the Syrian.

The Copts believe that Bishoy saw Jesus a number of times. When Bishoy's brethren learned that Jesus was coming, they gathered at the top of a mountain so that they might see him. On the way, they met an old man that asked these monks to help him on his way but they ignored him. Bishoy saw the man and carried him on his shoulders, only to discover that the old monk was none other but Christ himself. The latter told him that, for the extent of his love, his body will not see corruption. The Copts also believe that Bishoy washed the feet of Jesus who visited him as a poor stranger.

Bishoy is known as a defender of Orthodox faith against heresies. Having heard of an ascetic in the mountain of Ansena who taught that there was no Holy Spirit, Bishoy went to him carrying a weaved basket with three ears. When the old man asked him about the reason for making three ears for a basket, Bishoy replied "I have a Trinity, and everything I do is like the Trinity". After much debate from the Scriptures, the Old and New Testaments, the old ascetic reverted to Orthodoxy.

== Departure and relics ==
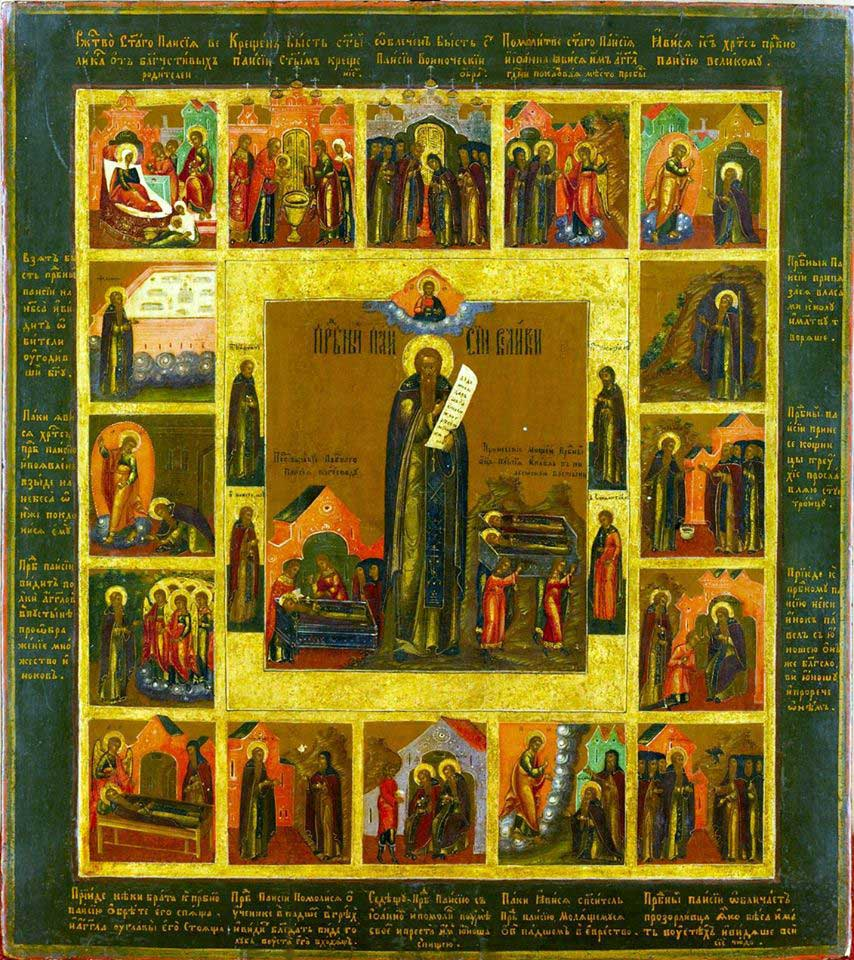
19th century Russian icon

In 407/408 AD, as the Mazices invaded the wilderness of Scetes, Bishoy left and dwelt in the mountain of Ansena. At this time, he met Paul of Tammah in Antinoöpolis and the two became very close friends. While at the mountain of Ansena, Bishoy built another monastery, the monastery of Saint Bishoy at Dayr al-Barsha, which still stands today near Mallawi. Bishoy departed on 8 Epip (July 15) 417 AD.

On December 13, 841 AD (4 Koiak), Pope Joseph I of Alexandria fulfilled the desire of Saint Bishoy and moved his body (as well as that of Paul of Tammah) to the Monastery of Saint Bishoy in the wilderness of Scetes. It is said that they first attempted to move the body of Saint Bishoy only, but when they carried it to the boat on the Nile, the boat would not move until they brought in the body of Paul of Tammah as well. Today, the two bodies lie in the main church of the Coptic Orthodox Monastery of Saint Bishoy in the Natroon Desert. Eyewitnesses recount that the body of Bishoy remains in an allegedly incorruptible state to this day.

== Monastic namesakes ==
There are currently three monasteries in Egypt that carry the name of Saint Bishoy:

- The Monastery of Saint Bishoy at the Nitrian Desert
- The Monastery of Saint Bishoy at Deir el-Bersha, near Mallawi
- The Monastery of Saint Bishoy at Armant, east of Armant

The Red Monastery near Souhag is also named after an Egyptian saint called Bishay. This saint is not to be confused with Saint Bishoy.
