= Paul of Tammah =

Egyptian saint

Saint Paul of Tammah

Hermit
- Born: 4th century Egypt
- Died: October 17th, 415; Mountain of Ansena, Egypt
- Venerated in: Oriental Orthodoxy
- Major shrine: Monastery of Saint Pishoy, Scetes, Egypt
- Feast: October 4 (O.S.) = Paopi 7, currently falls on October 17 (N.S.)

Paul of Tammah (Coptic: Ⲁⲃⲃⲁ Ⲡⲁⲩⲗⲉ ⲡⲓⲣⲉⲙⲧⲁⲙⲙⲟϩ; died October 17, 415 AD) was an Egyptian saint who lived in the fourth and fifth centuries AD. He is venerated as a saint in the Oriental Orthodox Churches.

== Life ==
Paul of Tammah lived as a hermit in the mountain of Ansena (currently in the El Minya governorate of Egypt). He had a disciple named Ezekiel. Paul of Tammah is most known for spending his life in lengthy fasts and worship. The Coptic Orthodox tradition has it that he would only break his fasts when Jesus told him to. He is credited to have written a number of ascetical texts. Towards the end of his life, he befriended Pishoy at the time when the latter fled the Nitrian Desert because of the Berbers' attacks, and went to dwell in the mountain of Ansena.

== Death and relics ==
Paul of Tammah died on 7 Paopi (October 17, 415 AD). He was buried along with Pishoy in the Monastery of Saint Pishoy at Deir El Barsha, which still exists today near Mallawi.

On 4 Koiak 557 AM (December 13, 841 AD), Pope Joseph I fulfilled the desire of Pishoy and moved his body as well as that of Paul of Tammah to the Monastery of Saint Pishoy in the wilderness of Scetes. It is said that they first attempted to move the body of Pishoy only, but when they carried it to the boat on the Nile, the boat would not move until they brought in the body of Paul of Tammah as well. Today, the two bodies lie in the main church of the Coptic Orthodox Monastery of Saint Pishoy in the Nitrian Desert.

== Sources ==
- Coptic Orthodox Church Synaxarium (Book of Saints)

== Bibliography ==
- Orlandi, Tito (1988). Paolo di Tamma: Opere. Rome. (in Italian)
- Vivian, Tim (1996). "Paul of Tamma: Four Works Concerning Monastic Spirituality". Coptic Church Review 17, no. 3 (1996): 110–112.
- Vivian, Tim (1998). "Paul of Tamma: On the Monastic Cell (De Cella)". Hallel 23, no. 2 (1998): 86–107.
