= Qallin =

Qallin قلين
- City
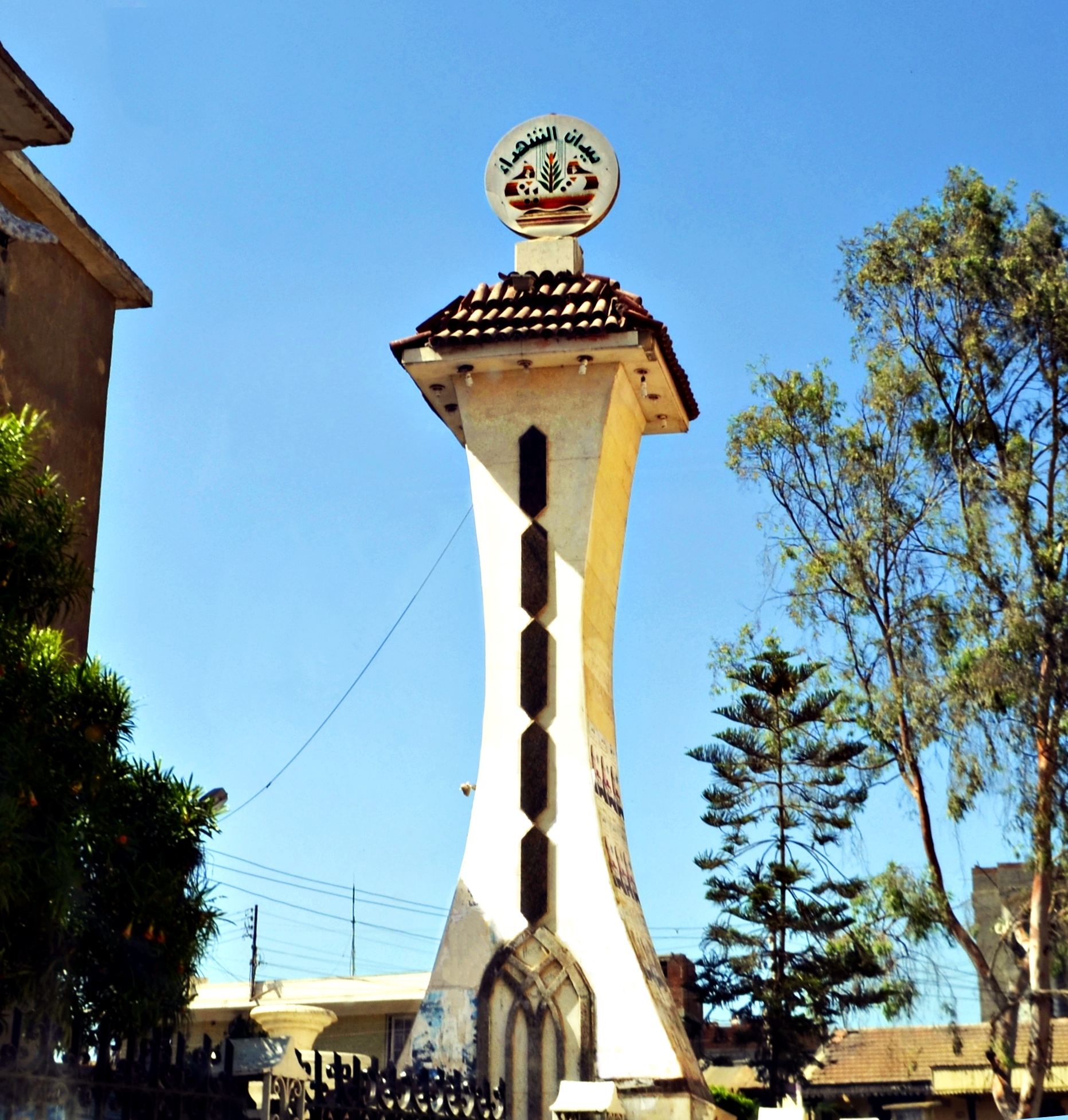
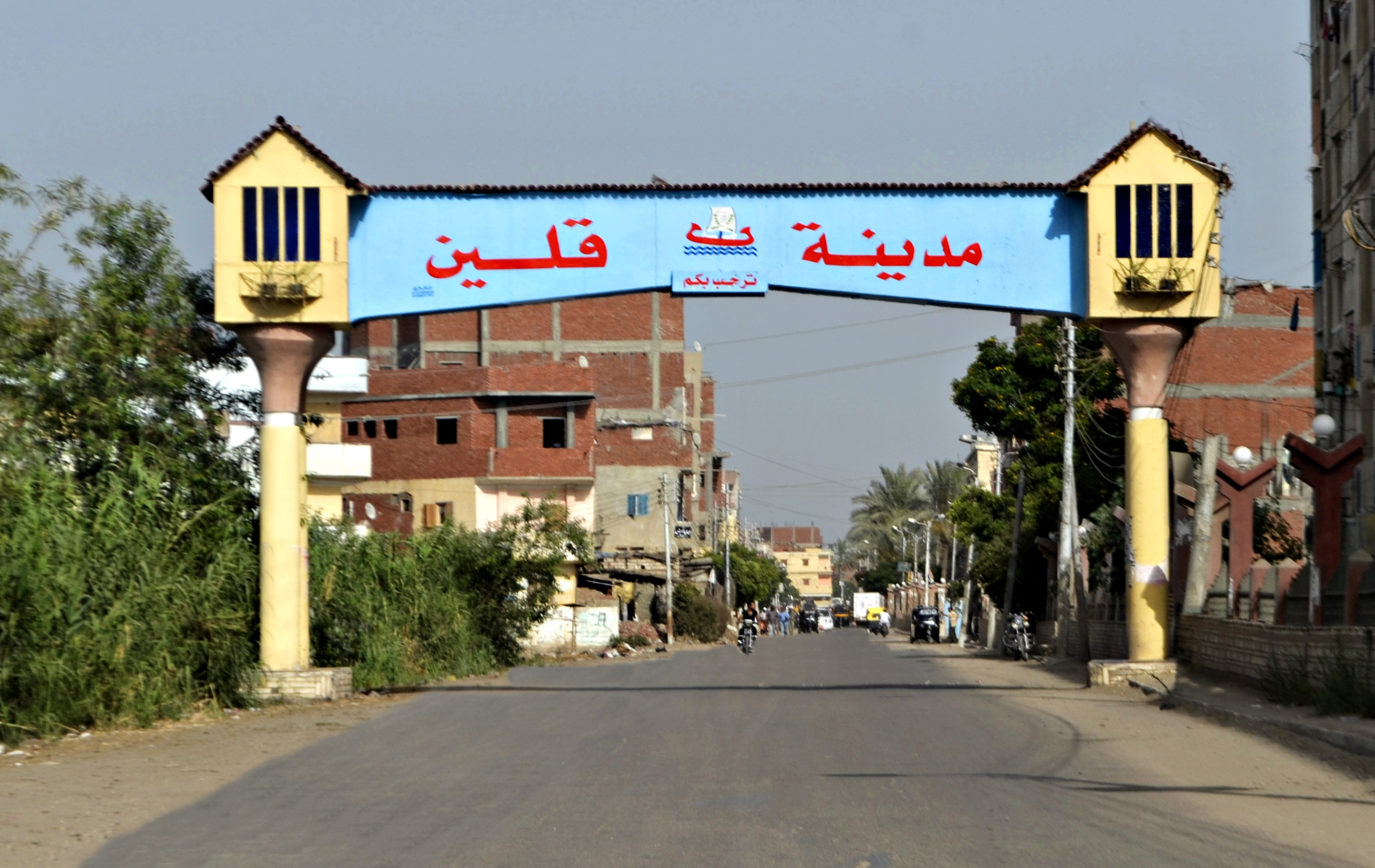
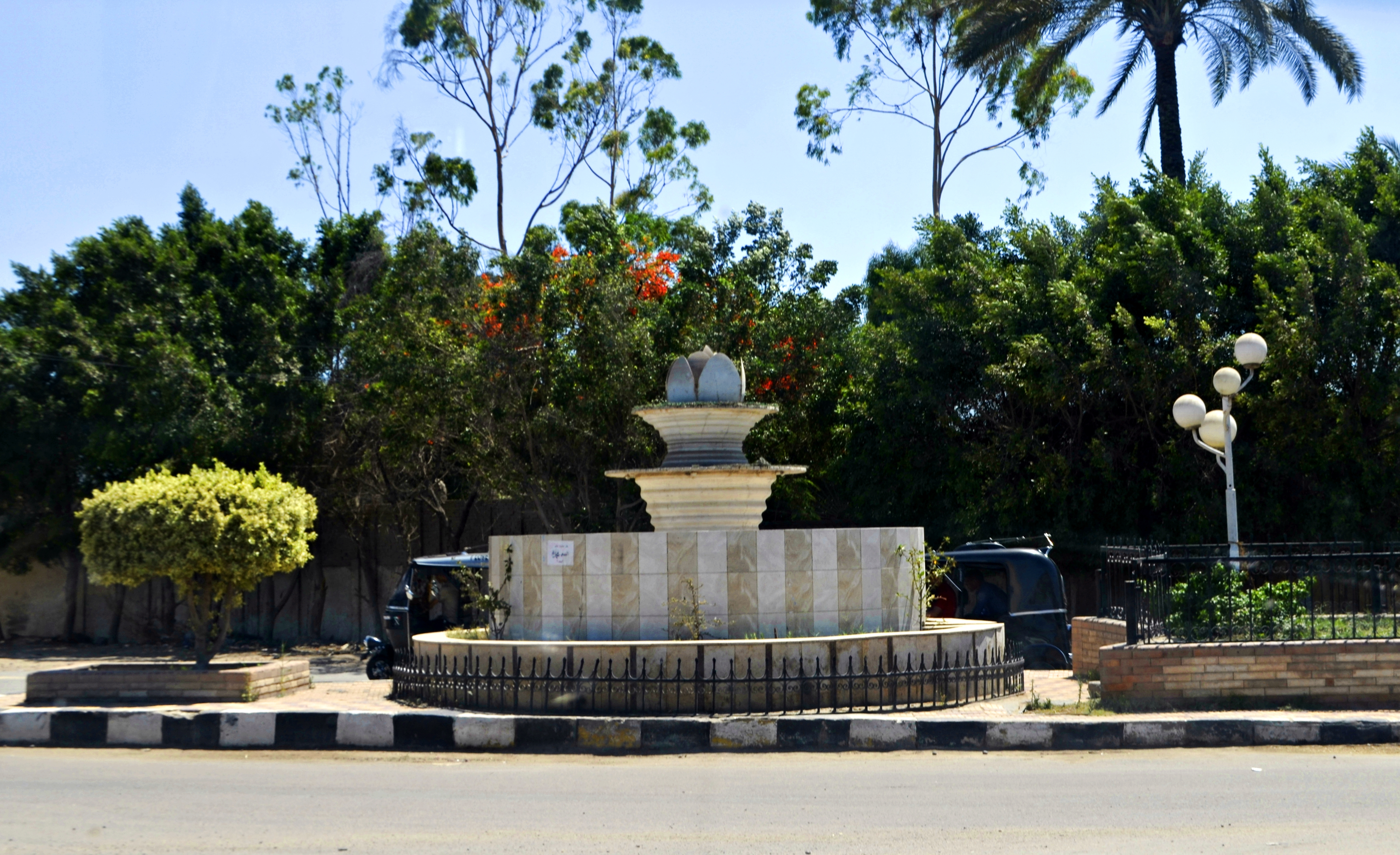
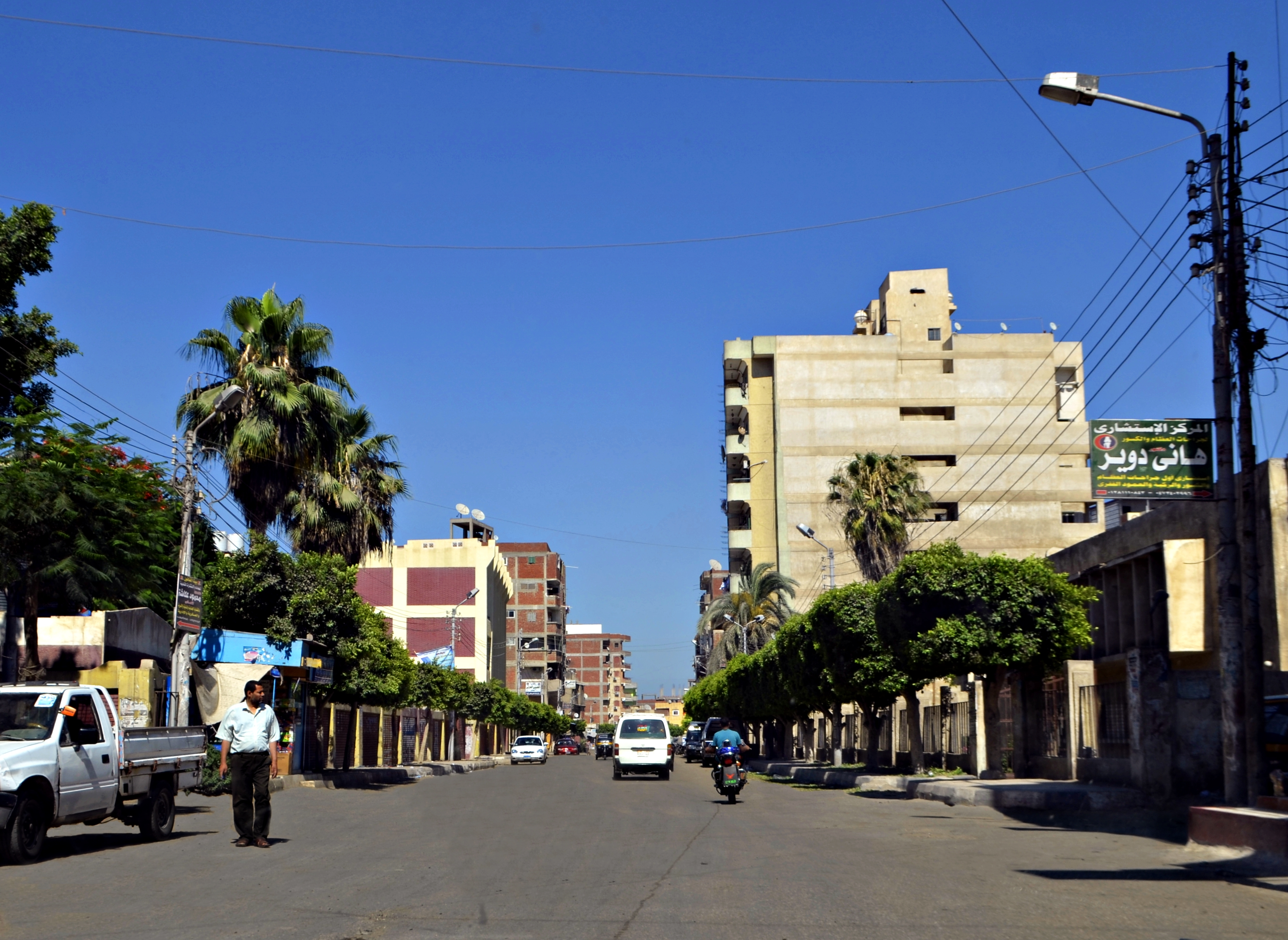
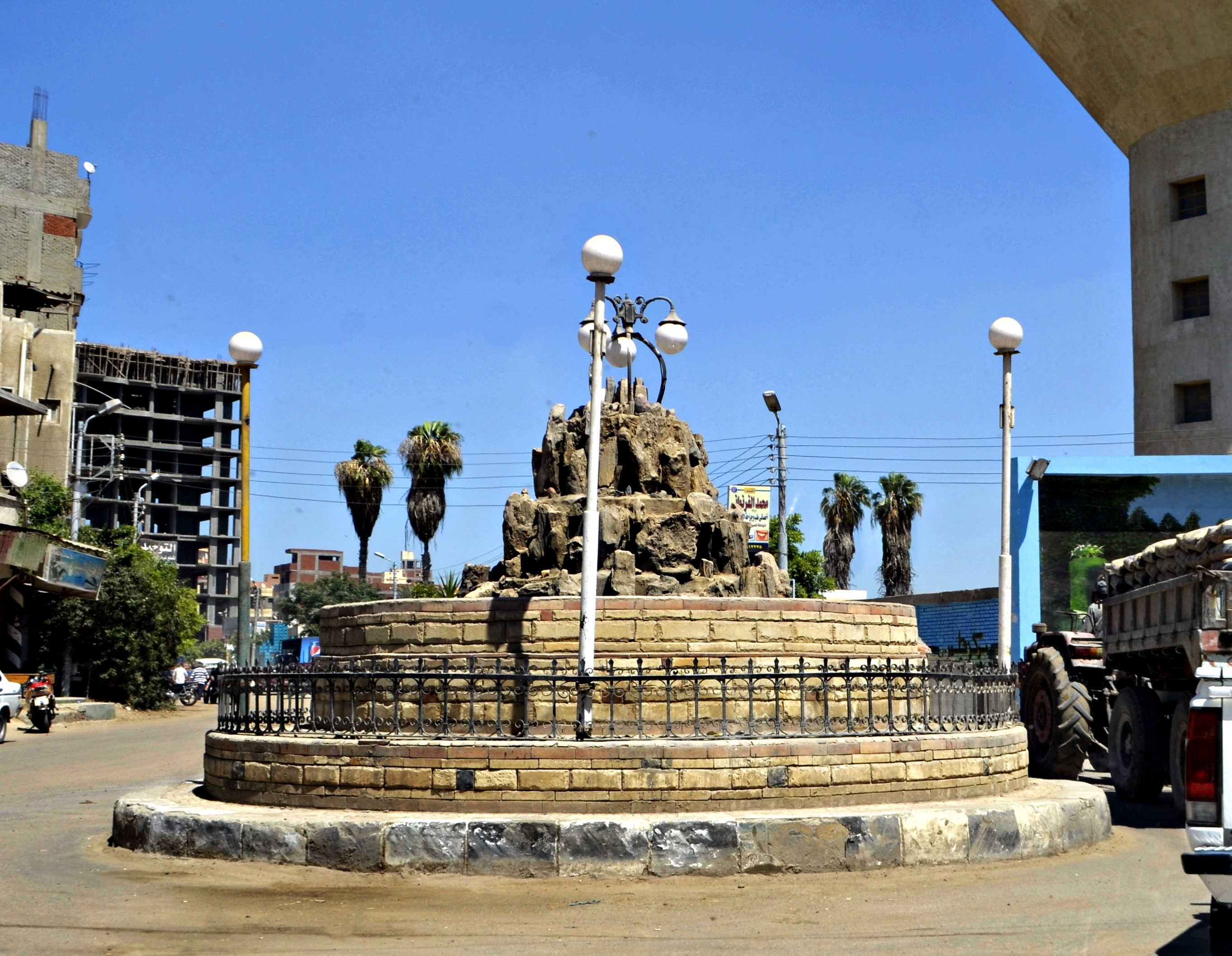

- Location in Egypt
- Coordinates: 31.04639°N 30.854581°E
- Country: Egypt
- Governorate: Kafr El Sheikh

Area
  - Total: 161.3 km^{2} (62.3 sq mi)

Population (2021)
  - Total: 284,853
  - Density: 1,766/km^{2} (4,574/sq mi)
- Time zone: UTC+2 (EET)
  - Summer (DST): UTC+3 (EEST)

Qallin (Arabic: قلين) is a city in the Kafr El Sheikh Governorate, Egypt.

The name of the city comes from Coptic: ⲕⲁⲗⲗⲓⲛ, which is probably a corruption of a personal name Kalleinos (Ancient Greek: Καλλινος).

== See also ==
- List of cities and towns in Egypt
