= Guerrini =

Guerrini is a surname. Notable people with the surname include:

- Adriana Guerrini (1907–1970), Italian operatic soprano
- Giancarlo Guerrini (1939–2025), Italian water polo player
- Giulia Guerrini (born 1996), Italian actress and singer
- Guglielmo Guerrini (born 1950), Italian sport coach
- Guido Guerrini (born 1976), Italian-Russian rally driver and co-driver
- Guido Guerrini (composer) (1890–1965), Italian composer, violinist, violist, conductor, music educator, academic administrator, and music critic
- Lucia Guerrini (1921–1990), Italian classical scholar, archaeologist, and professor
- Marcel Guerrini (born 1994), Swiss cross-country mountain biker
- Mino Guerrini (1927–1990), Italian director, screenwriter, journalist, actor, and painter
- Mirko Guerrini (born 1973), Italian-Australian jazz saxophonist, composer, and arranger
- Olindo Guerrini (1845–1916), Italian poet
- Orso Maria Guerrini (born 1942), Italian film, television and stage actor and voice actor
- Rocco Guerrini (1525–1596), Italian military engineer
- Virginia Guerrini (1871–1948), Italian operatic mezzo-soprano

== See also ==
- Guerini, another surname
