= 1765 in music =

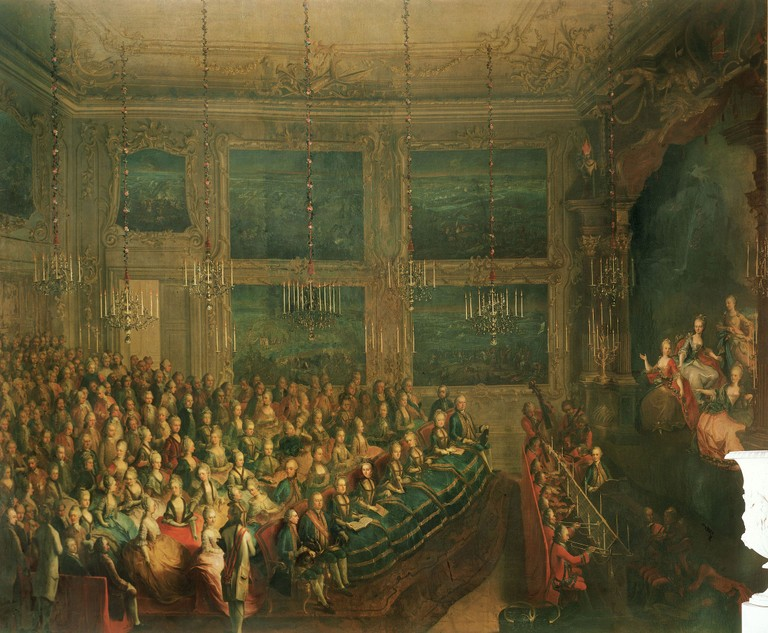
Il Parnaso confuso by Christoph Willibald Gluck (music) and Pietro Metastasio (libretto). Performed 1765 from the children of Maria Theresia: Maria Amalia (Apollo), Maria Elisabeth (Melpomene), Maria Josepha (Euterpe), Maria Karolina (Erato), Leopold (Harspichord)

== Events ==
- The Bach-Abel concerts are founded.
- The Bergen Philharmonic Orchestra ("Harmonien") is founded.
- First flamenco school established in Spain.

== Popular music ==
- James Hook – "I wish you all good night" (song)

== Opera ==
- Johann Adolph Hasse - "Romolo ed Ersilla"
- Johann Friedrich Agricola – Achille in Sciro, premiered Sept. 16 in Berlin
- Samuel Arnold
  - Daphne and Amintor
  - The Summer's Tale
- Georg Benda – Xindo riconnosciuto
- Andrea Bernasconi – Semiramide riconosciuta
- Christoph Willibald Gluck –
  - Alexandre
  - Il Parnaso confuso, Wq.33
  - Semiramis
- Josef Mysliveček – Il Bellerofonte
- Antonio Sacchini
  - La contadina in corte
  - Creso
- Tommaso Traetta – Semiramide

== Classical music ==
- Wilhelm Friedemann Bach – 12 Polonaises, F.12
- Joseph Haydn
  - Divertimento in E-flat major, Hob.II:6
  - Divertimento in F major, Hob.II:33
  - Divertimento in D major, Hob.II:35
  - Divertimento in G major, Hob.II:36
  - Divertimento in E major, Hob.II:37
  - String Trio in B-flat major, Hob.V:B1
  - Divertimento in G major, Hob.XIV:13
  - Divertimento in D major, Hob.XVI:4
  - Keyboard Sonata in C major, Hob.XVI:15 (authorship in question)
  - Keyboard Sonata in F major, Hob.XVI:47 (authorship in question)
  - Symphony No. 28
  - Cello Concerto No. 1
- Johann Ludwig Krebs – Sonata in A minor, Krebs-WV 838
- Wolfgang Amadeus Mozart
  - "God Is Our Refuge", K.20
  - "Conservati fedele", K.23
- Giovanni Marco Rutini – 6 Harpsichord Sonatas, Op.6
- Georg Philipp Telemann
  - Symphonie zur Serenate, TWV Anh.50:1
  - Grillen-Symphonie, TWV 50:1

== Publications ==
- Carl Philipp Emanuel Bach – Clavierstücke verschiedener Art (Berlin), Wq.112
- Johann Christian Bach – Six Simphonies, Op. 3 (London)
- Placidus von Camerloher – Sei sonate a tre, due violini e basso (6 Trio Sonatas), Op. 2 (Paris: Le Clerc, Mme Boivin)
- Armand-Louis Couperin – Sonates en pièces de clavecin avec accompagnement de violon ad libitum, Op. 2 (Paris)
- Francesco Guerini – Six Solos (cello sonatas), Op. 9 (London, approximately this year)

== Methods and theory writings ==
- Robert Crome – The Compleat Tutor for the Violoncello
- Pierre Simon Fournier – Traité historique et critique sur l’origine et les progrès des caractères de fonte pour l’impression de la musique
- Georg Simon Löhlein – Klavier-Schule
- Giuseppe Paolucci – Arte pratica di contrappunto
- Michael Johann Friedrich Weideburg – Der sich selbst informirende Clavierspieler

== Births ==
- February 8 – Joseph Leopold Eybler, composer (died 1846)
- June 13 – Anton Eberl, composer (died 1807)
- June 26 – Franz Xaver Kleinheinz, composer (died 1832)
- September 18 – Oliver Holden, composer (died 1844)
- October 7 – Michał Kleofas Ogiński, Polish composer (died 1833)
- October 22 – Daniel Steibelt, pianist and composer (died 1823)
- October 26 – Jakub Jan Ryba, composer (died 1815)
- November 20 – Friedrich Heinrich Himmel, composer (died 1814)
- November 23 – Thomas Attwood, composer (died 1838)
- December 25 – Joseph Mazzinghi, British composer (died 1844)
- Date unknown – Sofia Liljegren Finnish soprano (died 1795)

== Deaths ==
- January 12 – Johann Melchior Molter, German composer and violinist (born 1696)
- January 15 – Carlmann Kolb, composer (born 1703)
- January 19 – Johan Agrell, composer (born 1701)
- February 9 – Elisabetta de Gambarini, singer, composer and conductor (born 1730)
- March 20 – Paolo Antonio Rolli, librettist (born 1687)
- December 30 – Conrad Friedrich Hurlebusch, organist and composer (born c. 1691)
- date unknown
  - John Hebden, bassoonist, cellist and composer (born 1712)
  - Edward Henry Purcell, organist and music publisher
- probable – Louis-Antoine Dornel, harpsichordist, violinist and composer (born c.1685)
