= Guerini =

Guerini is an Italian surname. Notable people with the surname include:

- Francesco Guerini (fl. 1740–1770), Italian violinist and composer
- Giuseppe Guerini (born 1970), Italian cyclist
- Lorenzo Guerini (born 1966), Italian politician
- Stanislas Guerini (born 1982), French politician
- Vincenzo Guerini (footballer) (born 1953), Italian football player and manager
- Vincenzo Guerini (athlete) (born 1950), Italian sprinter

== See also ==
- Guerrini, another surname
