= Lucia Guerrini =

Italian classical scholar and archaeologist

Lucia Guerrini (1921–1990) was an Italian classical scholar, archaeologist and professor. After participating in the Phaistos excavations in Crete in 1957, she became an enthusiastic editor of the Enciclopedia dell'arte antica, classica e orientale (Encyclopaedia of Ancient, Classical and Oriental Art) under the auspices of Ranuccio Bianchi Bandinelli. From the 1950s, she taught Greek and Roman Art at the Sapienza University of Rome, succeeding Bandinelli as Professor of Archaeology and Greek and Roman Art in 1973. Guerrini participated in projects relating to Greek and Roman iconography, Coptic art and the Antinoöpolis excavations in Egypt.

== Biography ==
Born in Lodi, Lombardy, on 31 December 1931, Lucia Guerrini was the daughter of Erminio and Velia Perniceni. While at high school, she developed a strong interest in Greek and Roman antiquity which led her to study classics at the University of Milan. She graduated with honours in 1954 with a dissertation on Le stoffe copte del Museo archeologico di Firenze. Antica collezione (Coptic Fabrics from the Archaeological Museum of Florence. Ancient Collection), published in 1957. Encouraged by Giovanni Becatti, she continued her studies at the Italian School of Archaeology at Athens. As a result, she was able to participate in the 1957 excavations in Phaistos, Crete. She then moved to Rome where she collaborated with Bandinelli who had just been appointed professor of archaeology at the Sapienza University of Rome. From 1958, she edited the Enciclopedia dell'arte antica, writing many of the entries herself.

She also worked as Bandinelli's assistant at the university and from 1962 joined the editorial staff of Archeologia classica. She continued her collaboration for an extended period, contributing to the journal's development. She also participated in the discussions on reforming Italian archaeology documented in the journal Dialoghi di archeologia. In 1964, on Bandinelli's retirement, she collaborated with Becatti, who replaced him as professor of archaeology. During the 1960s, she deepened her research into Greek and Roman iconography, spending several periods in Athens. Her work is documented in various journals, including Annuario della Scuola archeologica italiana di Atene and Archeologia classica.

In the mid-1960s, Guerrini increased her collaboration with Sergio Donadoni in Egypt, participating in the excavation of the Roman city of Antinoöpolis. In 1973, she was appointed professor of archaeology and Greek and Roman history at La Sapienza. She embarked on a new field of study, addressing collections of ancient artefacts. This led to the publication of her Marmi antichi nei disegni di Pier Leone Ghezzi in 1971, examining Pier Leone Ghezzi's drawings of ancient marbles in the 18th century. She went on to research the sculptures in the Palazzo Mattei, publishing Palazzo Mattei di Giove. Le antichità in 1982. Subsequent works addressed sculptures in the Quirinal Palace. She also carried out research on Greek sculpture, including relationships to Roman copies.

After suffering a period of poor health, Lucia Guennini died in Lodi on 1 November 1990. The following year, her work was reviewed in Studi in memoria di Lucia Guerrini.
