= Elisabeth R. O'Connell =

- Occupation: Museum Curator

Academic background
- Education: University of California, Berkeley
- Thesis: Tombs for the Living: Monastic Reuse of Monumental Funerary Architecture in Late Antique Egypt
- Doctoral advisor: Susanna Elm

Academic work
- Discipline: Late Antiquity
- Institutions: British Museum
- Notable works: Egypt: Faith after the pharaohs, Silk Roads

Elisabeth R. O'Connell is Byzantine World curator across the departments of Britain Europe & Prehistory and Egypt & Sudan at the British Museum. She is particularly known for her work on late antique Egypt and monastic communities.

== Career ==
O'Connell completed her BA, MA, and PhD at the University of California, Berkeley in the faculty of Ancient History and Mediterranean Archaeology. Her PhD (awarded in 2007) examined how monastic communities in late antique Egypt re-used funerary architecture. During her PhD, O'Connell was the Kress Fellow in Egyptian Art and Architecture (2005-2006) at the American Research Centre in Egypt and received the Joan B. Gruen Essay Prize (2006) for her work Transforming Monumental Landscapes in Late Antique Egypt, the first year it was awarded. O'Connell also produced four exhibitions which also appear online for the Center for the Tebtunis Papyri, part of the Bancroft Library of the University of California, Berkeley, including Ethnic identity in Graeco-Roman Egypt and Readers and writers in Roman Tebtunis.

In 2007, O'Connell joined the Department of Ancient Egypt & Sudan at the British Museum where she curates the collection of Roman and late antique objects from Egypt. In 2018, she was appointed Byzantine World curator, responsible for collections in the Department of Britain & Prehistory. She has held fellowships in Egypt, the USA and UK.

O'Connell has worked at the sites in Tunisia, Sudan and Egypt, where she co-directed British Museum work at Hagr Edfu in Upper Egypt, publishing the fieldwork reports in a series of articles with Vivian Davies. She has also re-assembled previously unpublished objects collected during early 20th century fieldwork in Egypt for modern publication from the sites of Antinoupolis and Wadi Sarga. O'Connell's work in publishing and synthesising new and old work on late antique Egypt is an important part of a new wave of scholarship on a previously neglected period in Egypt.

O'Connell curated the British Museum exhibition Egypt: Faith After the Pharaohs in 2015-2016, which examined the different faiths in Egypt from the Roman period to the arrival of Islam. The exhibition started with objects from c.30 BC, when Egypt became a province of the Roman Empire after the death of Cleopatra and Mark Antony, and then examined different faiths in Egypt until AD 1171 when the rule of the Islamic Fatimid dynasty ended. The exhibition was described as 'trail-blazing' for its examination of religious history in Egypt.

In 2017-2018 O'Connell held a research fellowship from the Empires of Faith project.

In 2024-2025, she was one of three lead curators for the British Museum's Silk Roads exhibition (2024-2025).

== Select bibliography ==
- (ed.) with C. Fluck, and G. Helmecke eds Egypt: Faith after the pharaohs (British Museum Press, London, 2015).
- (ed.) Egypt in the First Millennium AD: Perspectives from new fieldwork. British Museum Publications on Egypt and Sudan 2 (Peeters, Leuven, 2014).
- (ed.). Abydos in the First Millennium AD. British Museum Publications on Egypt and Sudan 9 (Peeters, Leuven, 2020).
- (ed.). Egypt and empire: The formation of religious identity after Rome. British Museum Publications on Egypt and Sudan 11 (Peeters, Leuven, 2022).
- (ed.). The Hay archive of Coptic spells on leather: A multi-disciplinary approach to the materiality of magical practice. BM Research Publications 233 (British Museum Press, London, 2022).
- with S. Brunning, Luk Y.-P., E. R. O’Connell and T. Williams. Silk Roads (British Museum Press, London, 2024).
