= Antinoöpolis =

Antinoöpolis ⲁⲛⲧⲓⲛⲱⲟⲩ الشيخ عبادة أنصنا
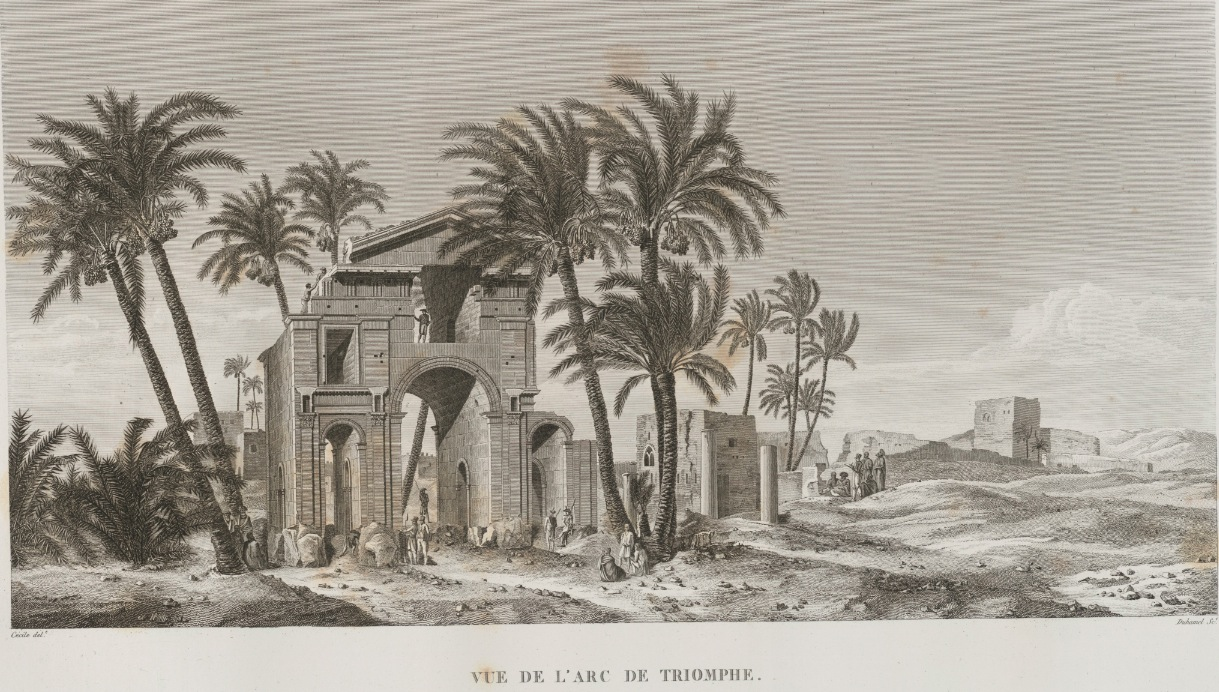
- Antinoöpolis: 19th century AD view of the triumphal arch, from Description de l'Égypte.

- Location in Egypt
- Coordinates: 27°48′27″N 30°52′48″E
- Country: Egypt
- City: Minya
- Town: Mallawi

Government
  - Type: Minya Governorate
- Time zone: UTC+2 (EST)

Antinoöpolis (also Antinoopolis, Antinoë, Antinopolis; Ancient Greek: Ἀντινόου πόλις; Coptic: ⲁⲛⲧⲓⲛⲱⲟⲩ Antinow; Arabic: انصنا, romanized: Ansinā, modern Arabic: الشيخ عبادة, modern Sheikh 'Ibada or Sheik Abāda) was a city founded at an older Egyptian village by the Roman emperor Hadrian to commemorate his deified young beloved, Antinoüs, on the east bank of the Nile, not far from the site in Upper Egypt where Antinoüs drowned in 130 AD. Antinoöpolis was a little to the south of the Egyptian village of Besa (Βῆσσα), named after the god and oracle of Bes. Antinoöpolis was built at the foot of the hill upon which Besa was seated. The city is located nearly opposite Hermopolis Magna and was connected to Berenice Troglodytica by the Via Hadriana.

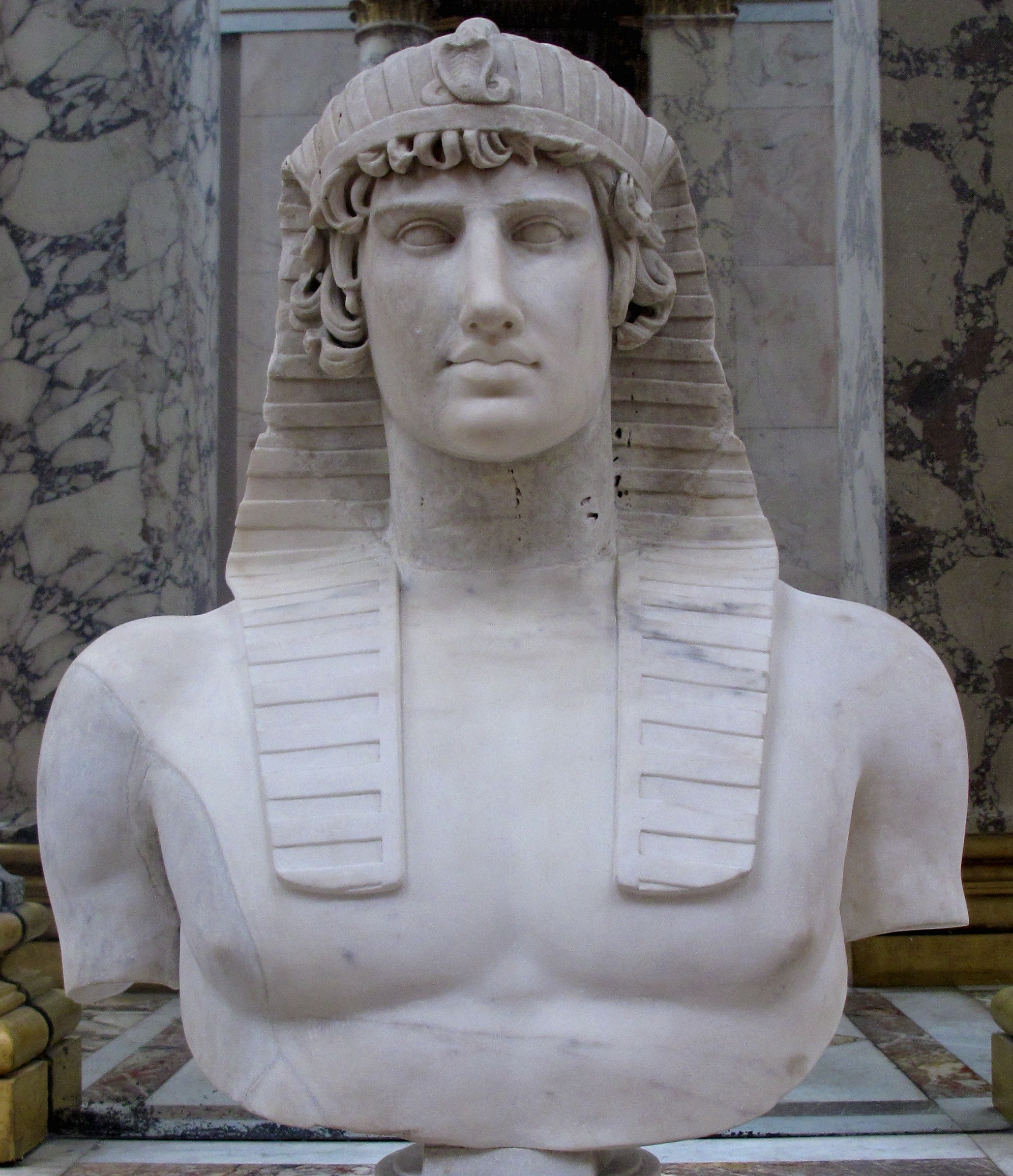
Bust of Antinoüs-Osiris from Hadrian's Villa at Tivoli (Louvre)

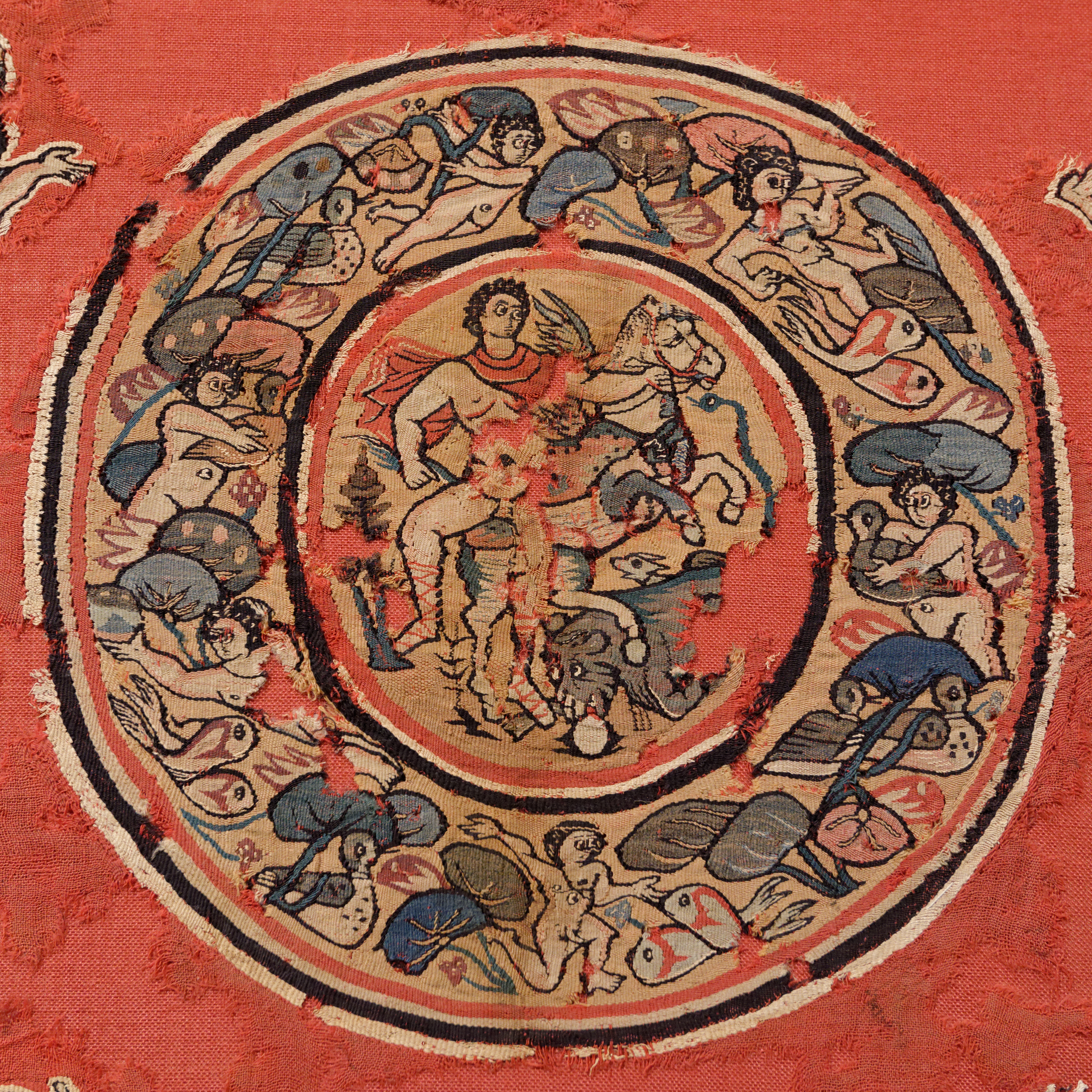
Fragment of a cloth from the tomb of Sabina, a 4–5th century woman in Antinoöpolis, showing Bellerophon and Pegasus trampling on the Chimera. (Louvre)

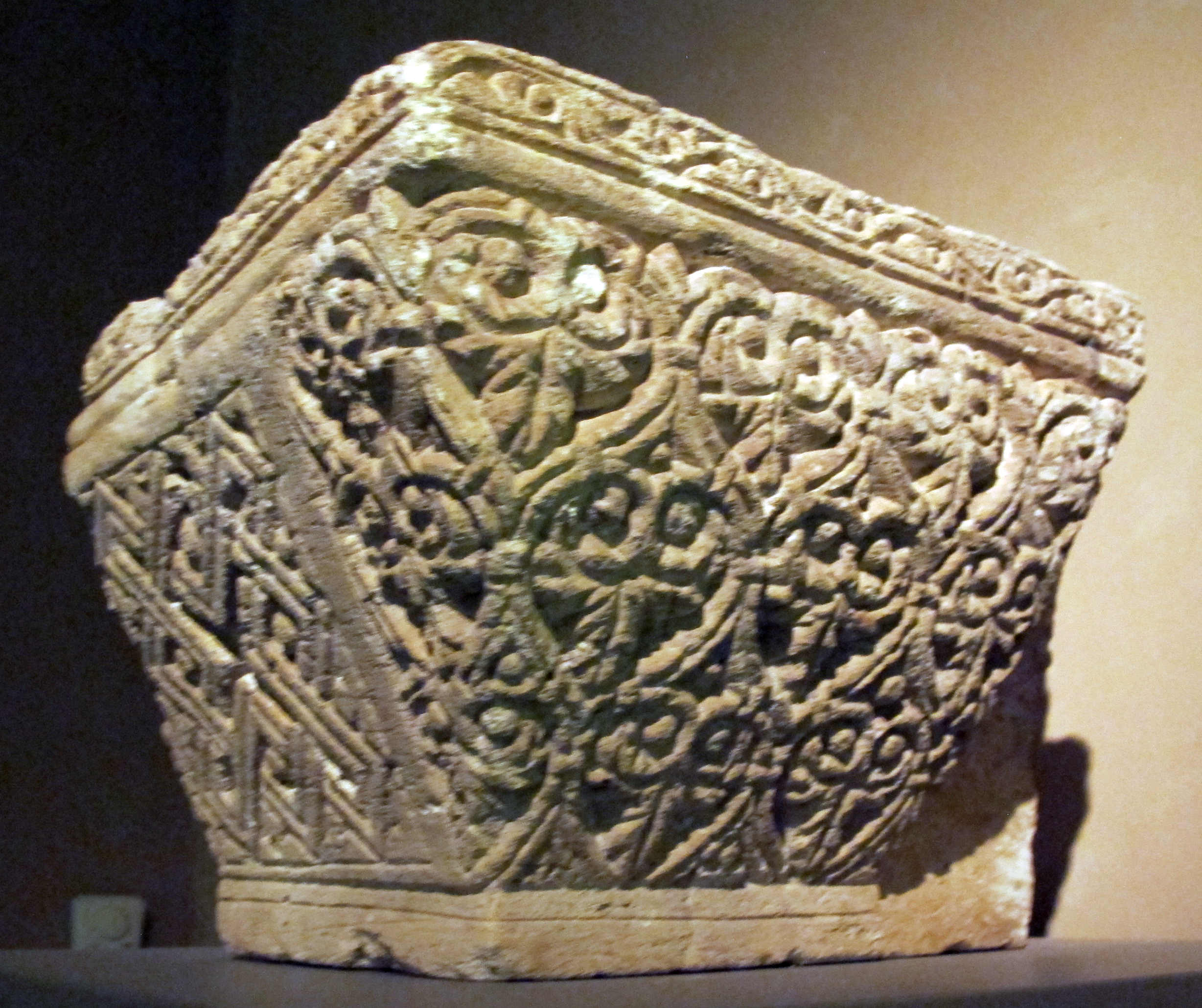
Late Roman column capital from the north necropolis (National Archaeological Museum, Florence)

== History ==
=== New Kingdom ===
During the New Kingdom, the city, Hir-we, was the location of Ramesses II's great temple, dedicated to the gods of Khmun and Heliopolis.

=== Roman period ===
During the Roman Empire, the city of Antinoöpolis was erected in AD 130 by the emperor Hadrian on the site of Hir-we as the cult centre of the deified Antinoüs. All previous buildings, including a necropolis, were razed and replaced, with the exception of the Temple of Ramses II. Hadrian also had political motives for the creation of Antinoöpolis, which was to be the first Hellenic city in the Middle Nile region, thus serving as a bastion of Greek culture within the Egyptian area. To encourage Egyptians to integrate with this imported Greek culture he allowed the main deity of Hir-we, Bes, to continue to be worshipped in Antinoöpolis alongside the new primary deity, Osiris-Antinoüs. He encouraged Greeks from elsewhere to settle in the new city, using various incentives to do so. The city was designed on a gridiron plan that was typical of Hellenic cities, and embellished with columns and many statues of Antinoüs, as well as a temple devoted to the deity.

The city of Antinoöpolis was the centre of the official cult of Antinoüs. The city exhibited the Graeco-Roman architecture of Hadrian's age in immediate contrast with the Egyptian style. Hadrian proclaimed that games would be held at the city in Spring 131 in commemoration of Antinoüs. Known as the Antinoeia, they would be held annually for several centuries, being noted as the most important in Egypt. Events included athletic competitions, chariot and equestrian races, and artistic and musical festivals, with prizes including citizenship, money, tokens, and free lifetime maintenance. Divine honours were paid in the Antinoeion to Antinoüs as a local deity, and games and chariot-races were annually exhibited in commemoration of his death and of Hadrian's sorrow. (Dictionary of Antiquities, s. v. Ἀντινόεια.) According to the Greek Menaea, it was at Antinoë that Saint Julian underwent martyrdom during the Persecutions of Diocletian. Numerous other Christian martyrs are known to have died here under the orders of the governor Arianus.

=== Byzantine period ===
Antinoöpolis continued to grow into the Byzantine era, being Christianized with the conversion of the Empire, but retaining an association with magic for centuries to come. As a cultural centre, it was the native city of the 4th-century mathematician Serenus of Antinoöpolis. Antinoöpolis in the 6th century was still a "most illustrious' city in a surviving divorce decree of 569 AD.

=== Medieval period ===
The city was abandoned around the 10th century. It continued to host a massive Graeco-Roman temple until the 19th century, when it was destroyed to feed a cement works. Over the centuries, stone from the Hadrianic city was removed for the construction of homes and mosques. By the 18th century, the ruins of Antinopolis were still visible, being recorded by such European travellers as Jesuit missionary Claude Sicard in 1715 and Edme-François Jomard the surveyor circa 1800. However, in the 19th century, Antinopolis was almost completely destroyed by local industrial production, as the chalk and limestone was burned for powder while stone was used in the construction of a nearby dam and sugar factory.

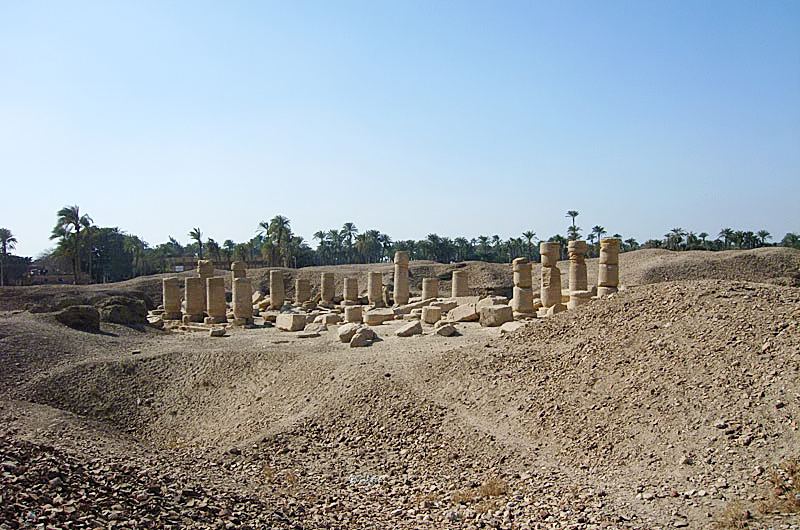
Ruins of the Temple of Ramses

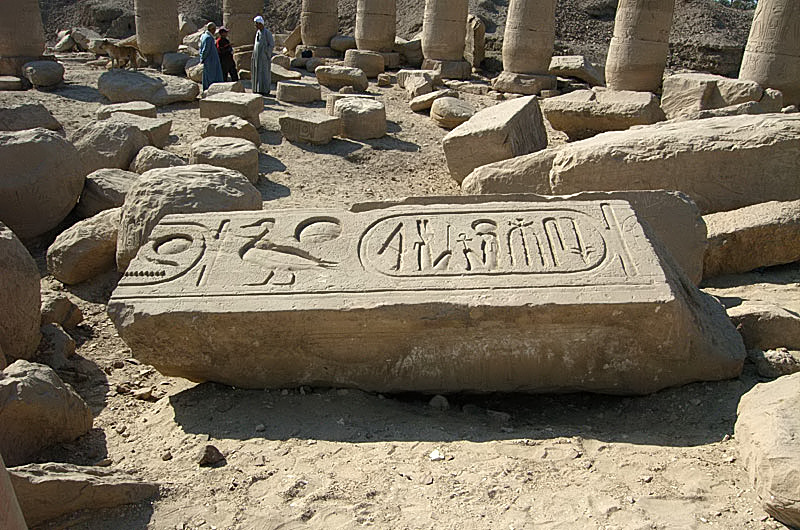
Cartouche from the Temple of Ramses

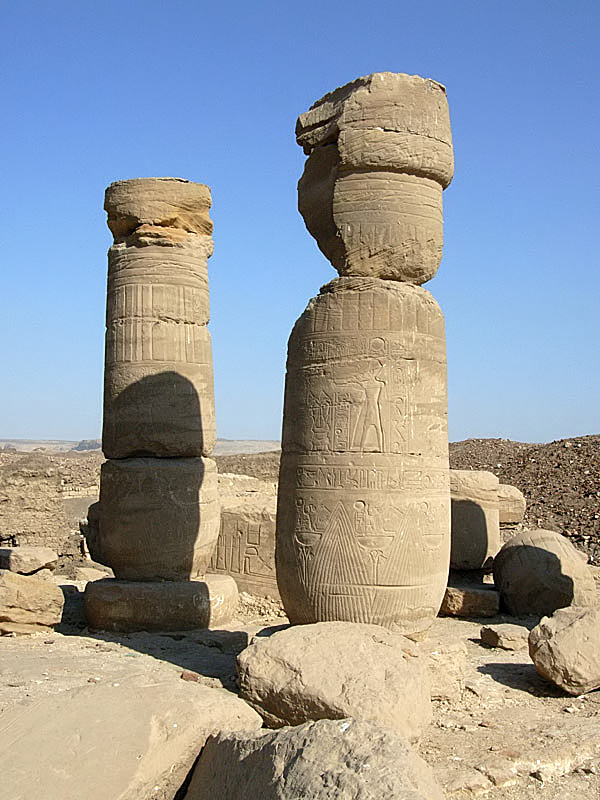
Columns from the Temple of Ramses

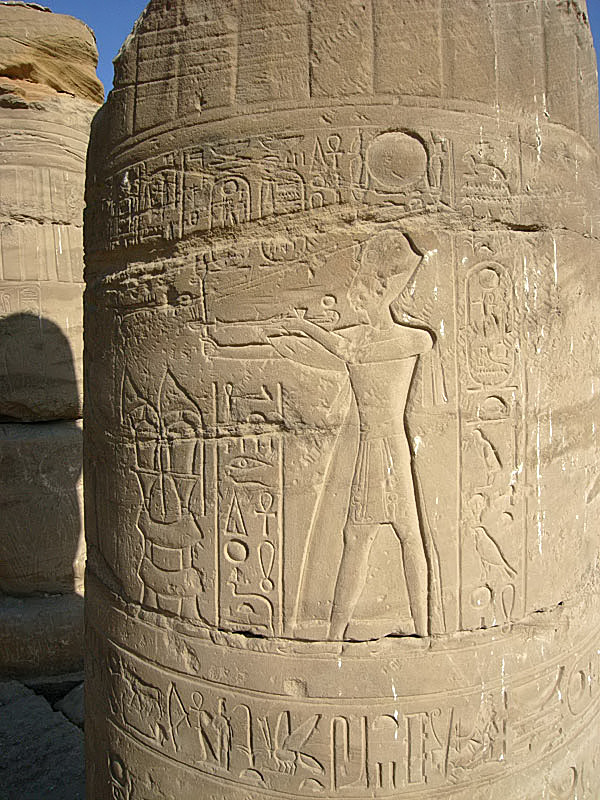
Carvings and hieroglyphs from the Temple of Ramses

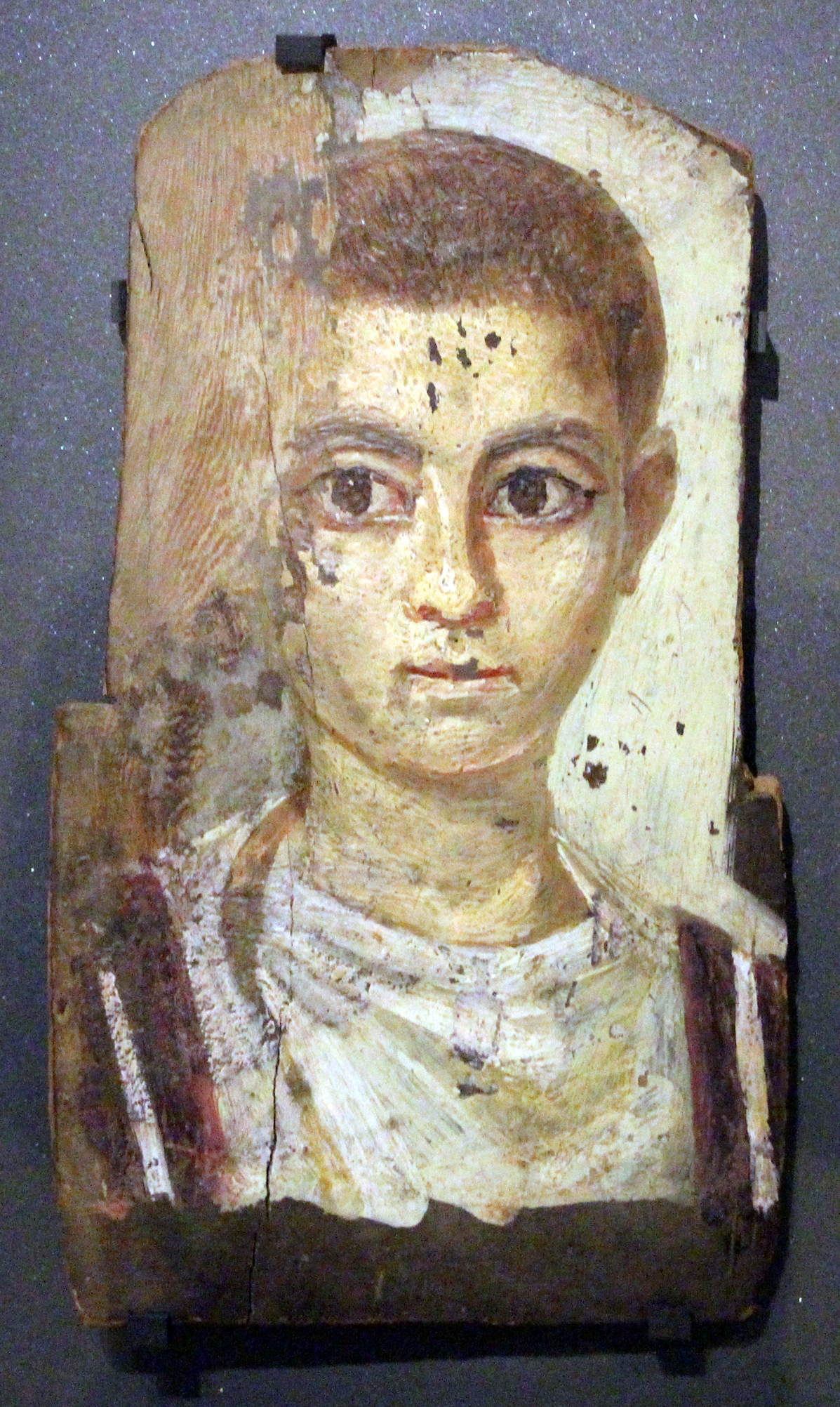
Funerary portrait of a boy, AD c. 190–230

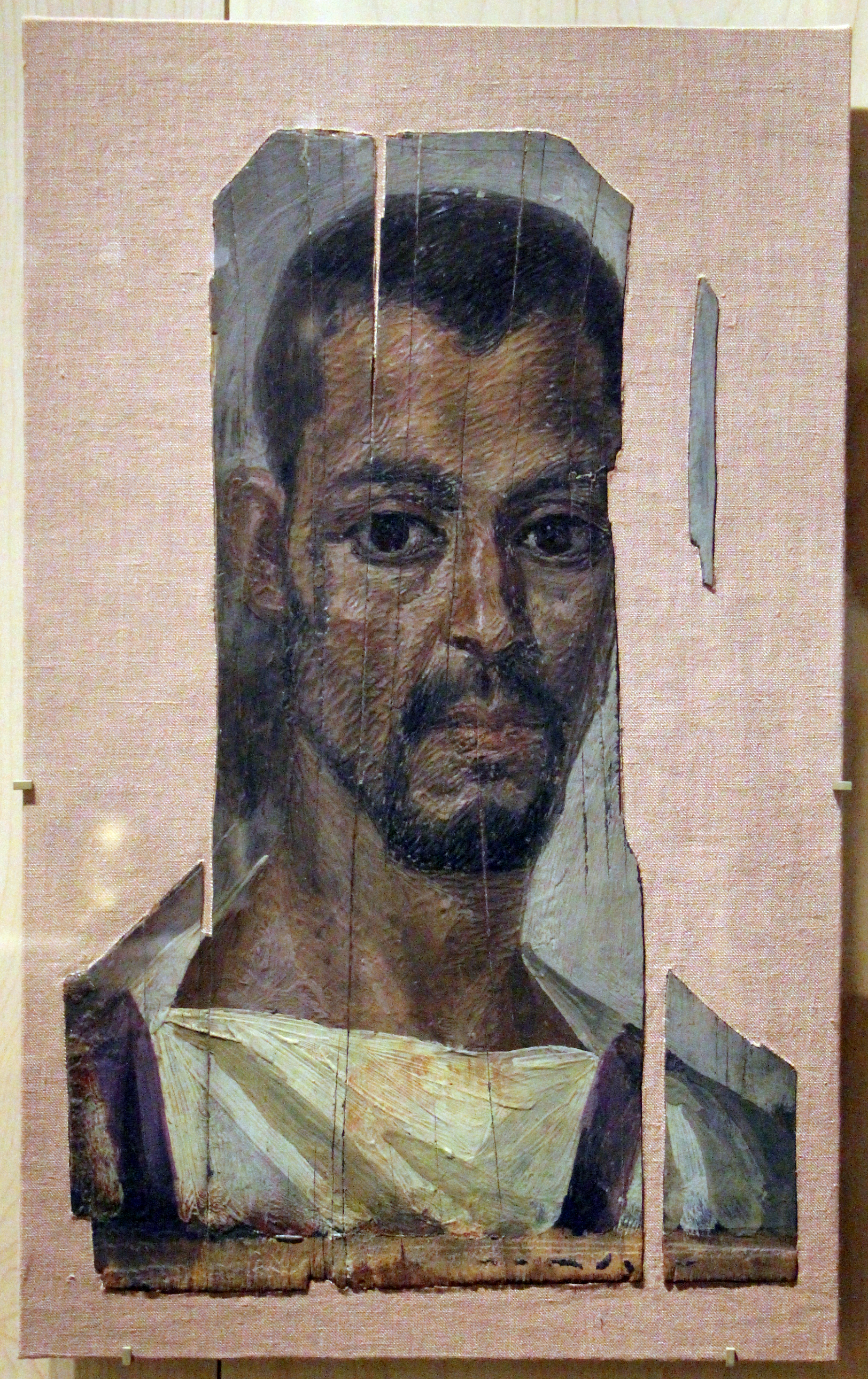
Funerary portrait of a man, AD c. 190–230

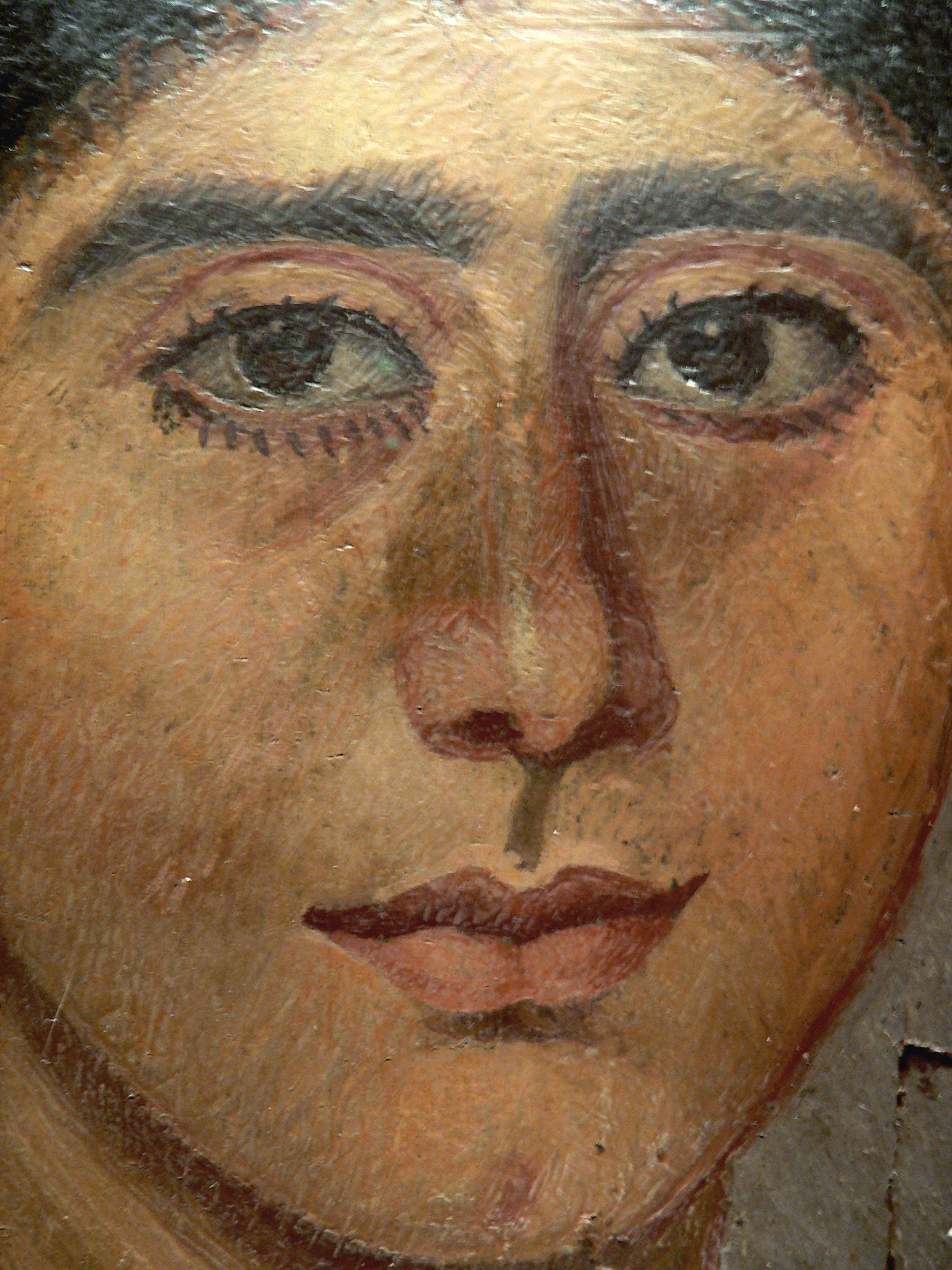
Encaustic funerary portrait of a woman

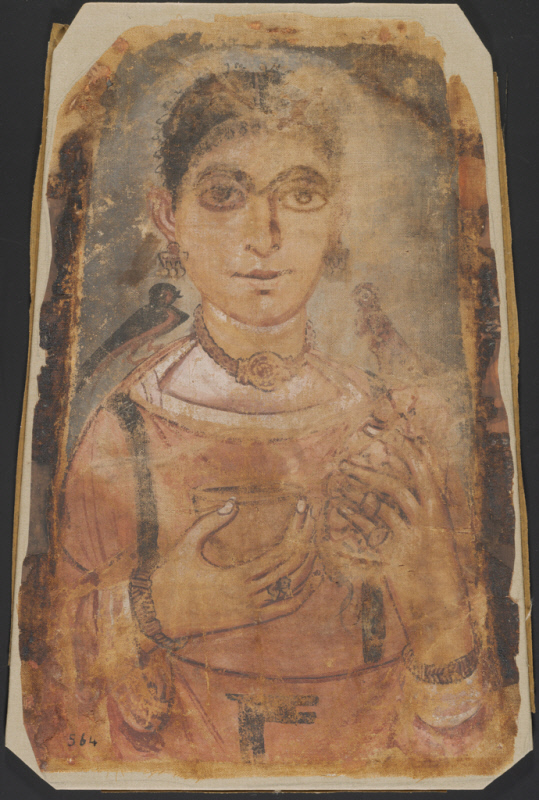
Funerary portrait of a woman. Probably from Antinoöpolis, c. 250–300 AD (Menil Collection)

== Structure and organization ==
The city of Antinoöpolis was governed by its own senate and prytaneus or president. The senate was chosen from the members of the wards (φυλαί), of which we learn the name of one – Ἀθηναΐς – from inscriptions (Orelli, No. 4705); and its decrees, as well as those of the prytaneus, were not, as usual, subject to the revision of the nomarch, but to that of the prefect (ἐπιστράτηγος) of the Thebaid. Antinoöpolis first belonged to the Heptanomis, but under Diocletian (286 AD) Antinoöpolis became the capital of the nome of the Thebaid.

Antinoë was the seat of a Christian bishop by the 4th century, originally a suffragan of the metropolitan see of Ptolemais in Thebaide, but it became a metropolitan see itself in the 5th century, having as suffragans Herrmopolis Parva, Cusae, Lycopolis, Hypselis, Apollonopolis Parva, Antaeopolis, Panopolis and Theodosiopolis. No longer a Latin residential bishopric, Antinoë is today listed by the Catholic Church as a titular see.

== Archaeological finds ==
The earliest finds at the site date to the New Kingdom, when Bes and Hathor were important deities. A grotto, once inhabited by Christian anchorites, probably marks the seat of the shrine and oracle, and Grecian tombs with inscriptions point to the necropolis of Antinoöpolis. The ruins of Antinoöpolis attest, by the area which they fill, the ancient grandeur of the city. The direction of the principal streets may still be traced. The streets were built on a grid plan with roads intersecting at right angles, like the majority of Roman cities at this time, and Jomard, a member of Napoleon's Commission d’Egypte found that the streets were divided into quarters and blocks, with each building being conveniently numbered. One at least of them, which ran from north to south, had on either side of it a corridor supported by columns for the convenience of foot-passengers. The walls of the theatre near the southern gate, and those of the hippodrome without the walls to the east, are still extant. At the north-western extremity of the city was a portico, of which four columns remain, inscribed to Good Fortune, and bearing the date of the 14th and last year of the reign of Alexander Severus, 235 AD.

As far as can be ascertained from the space covered with mounds of masonry, Antinoöpolis was about a mile and a half in length, and nearly half a mile broad. The remains of the city, having a three and a half mile circumference, suggests Roman and Hellenistic foundations and was surrounded by a brick wall on three sides, leaving the fourth side open to the Nile. Near the Hippodrome are a well and tanks appertaining to an ancient road, which leads from the eastern gate to a valley behind the town, ascends the mountains, and, passing through the desert by the Wádee Tarfa, joins the roads to the quarries of the Mons Porphyrites. At the beginning of the 19th century, when Napoleonic surveys were made, a theatre, many temples, a triumphal arch, two streets with double colonnades (illustrated in Description de l'Egypte), a circus, and a hippodrome nearby, were still to be seen.

A small collection of textiles excavated 1913–1914 by John de Monins Johnson are held in the collections of the Museum of New Zealand Te Papa Tongarewa.

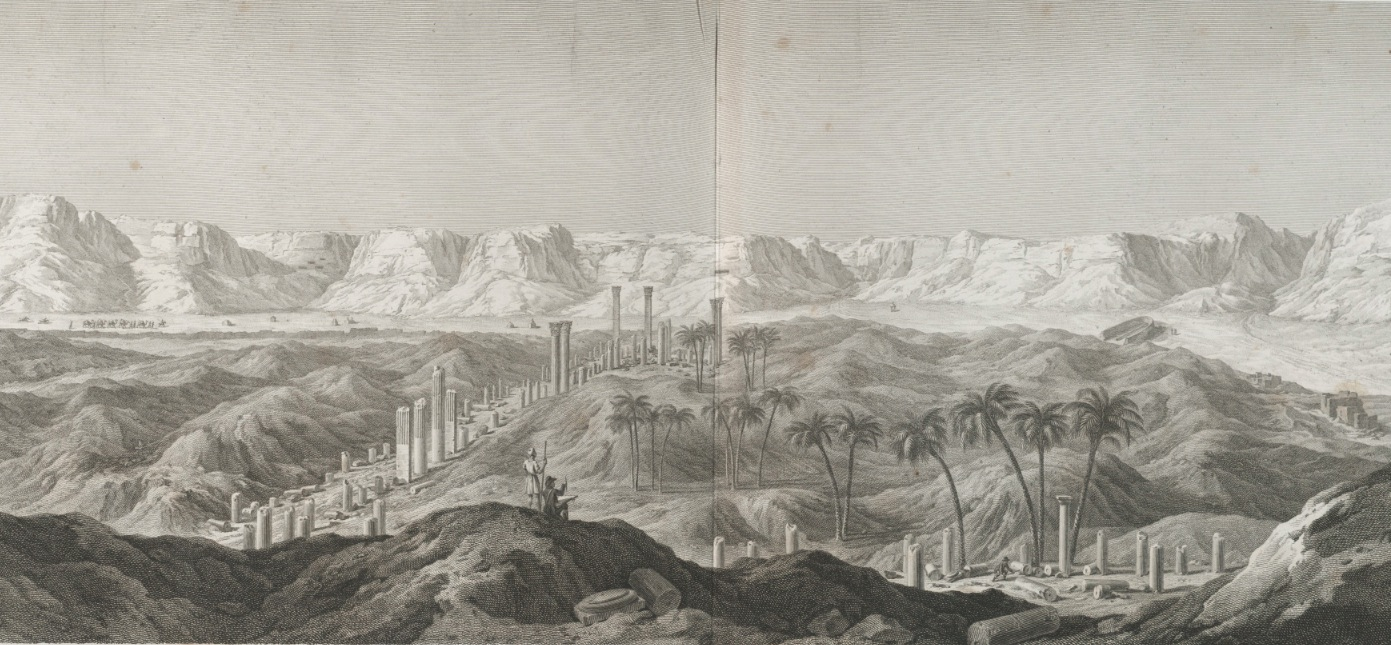
View of the Antinoöpolis ruin-field from the south-west in 1809, from the Description de l'Égypte
Illustrations of Antinoöpolis from Description de l'Égypte

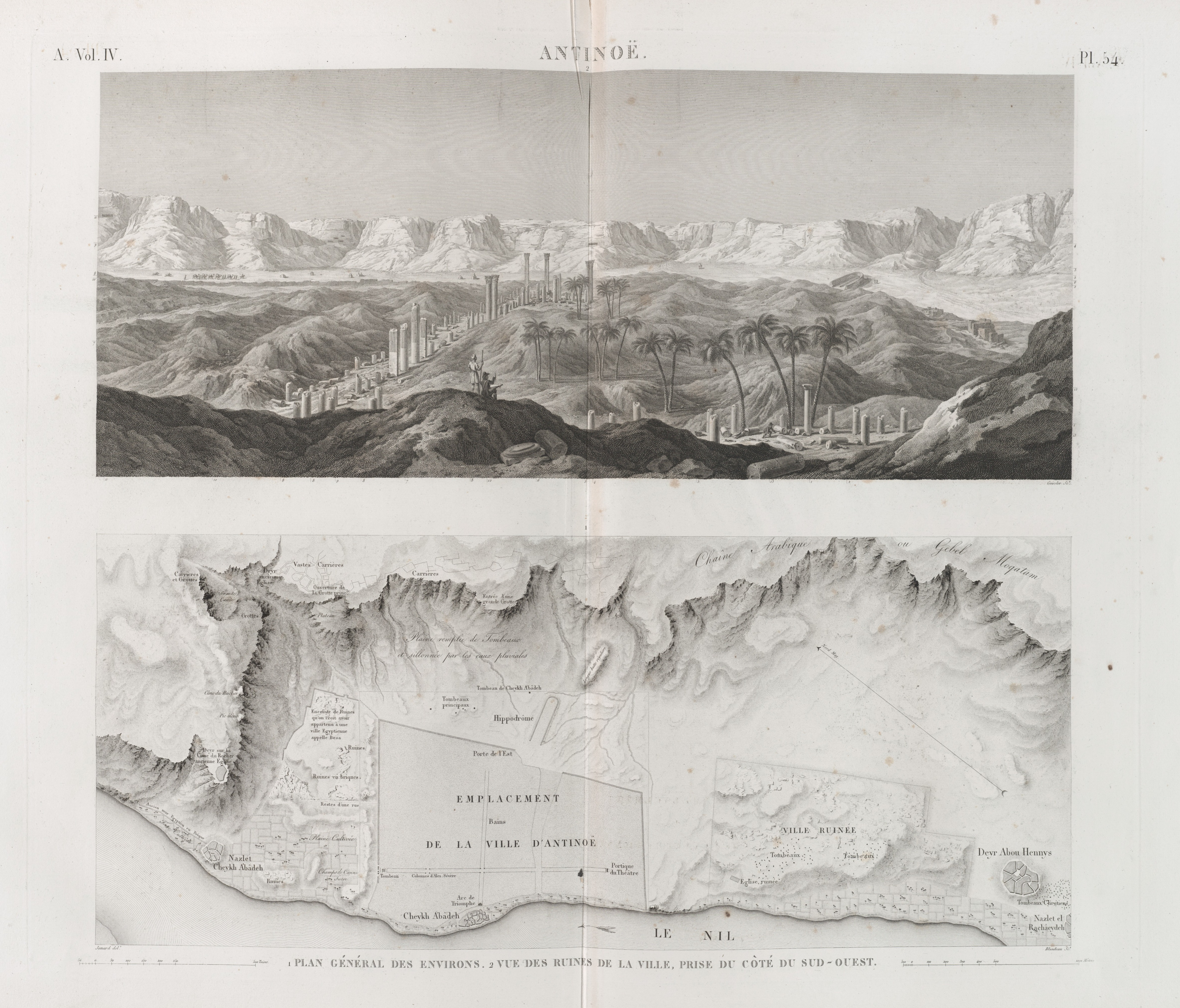
Ruin-field from the south-west & topography

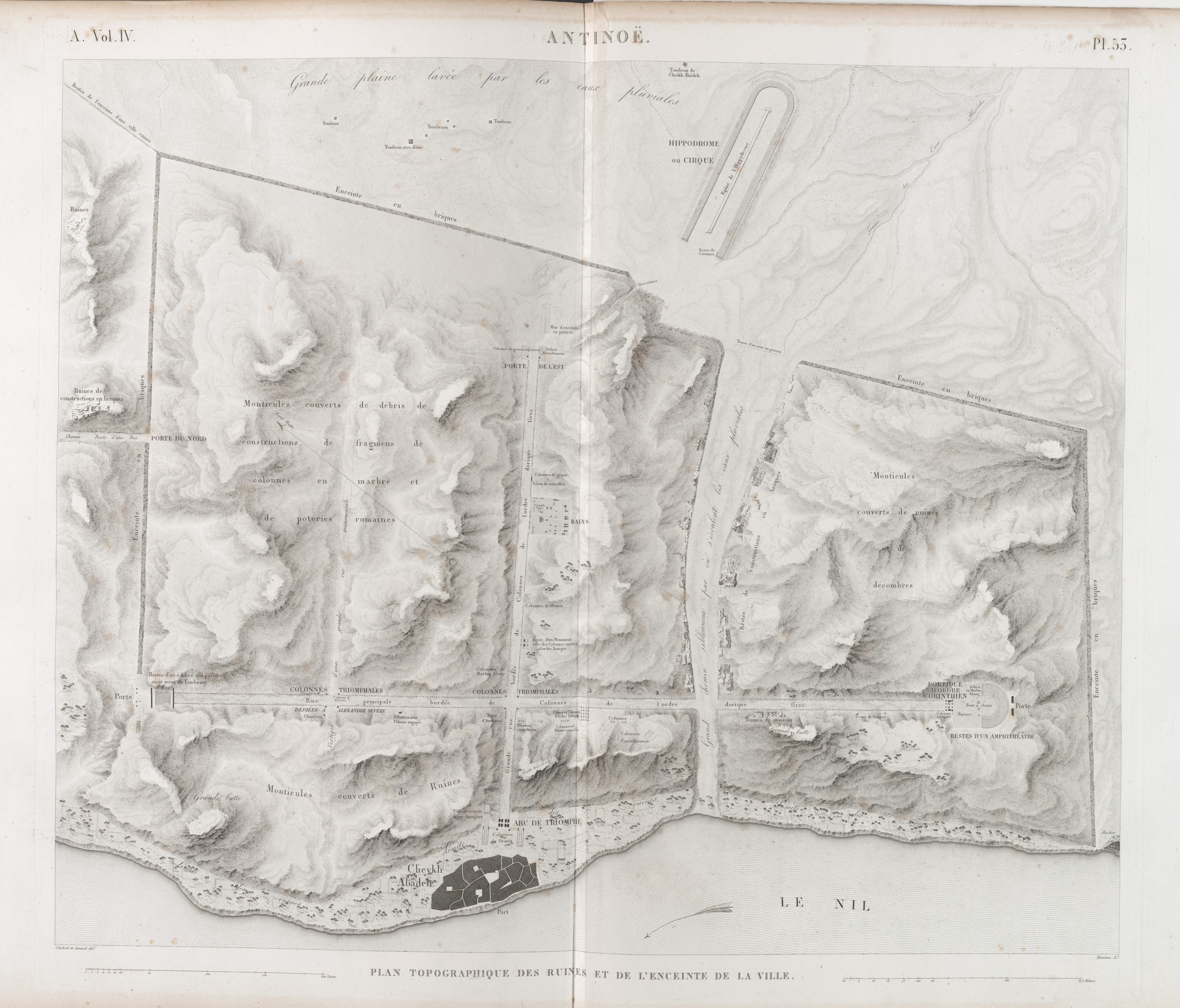
Topographical map of the city

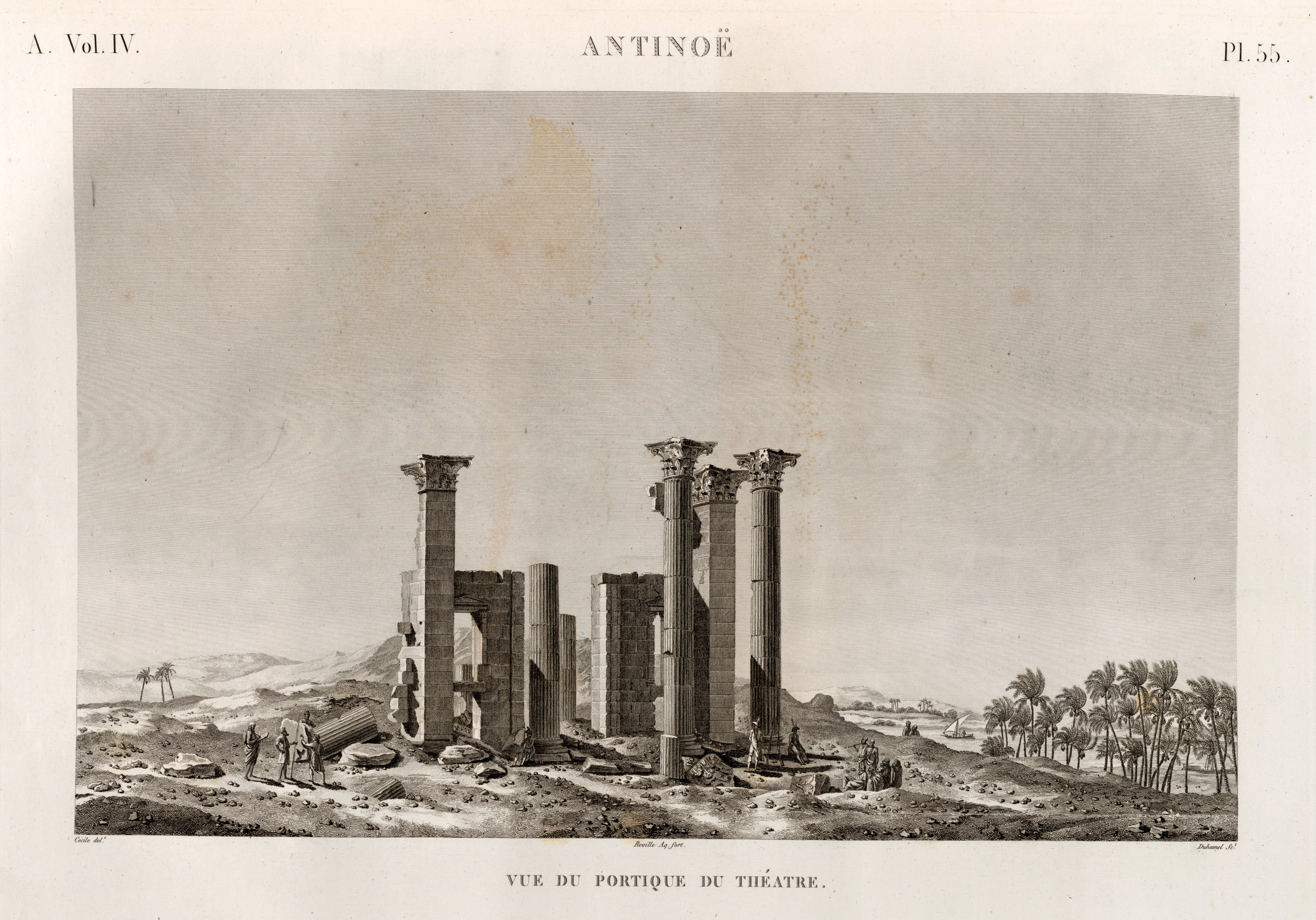
Portico of the Roman theatre

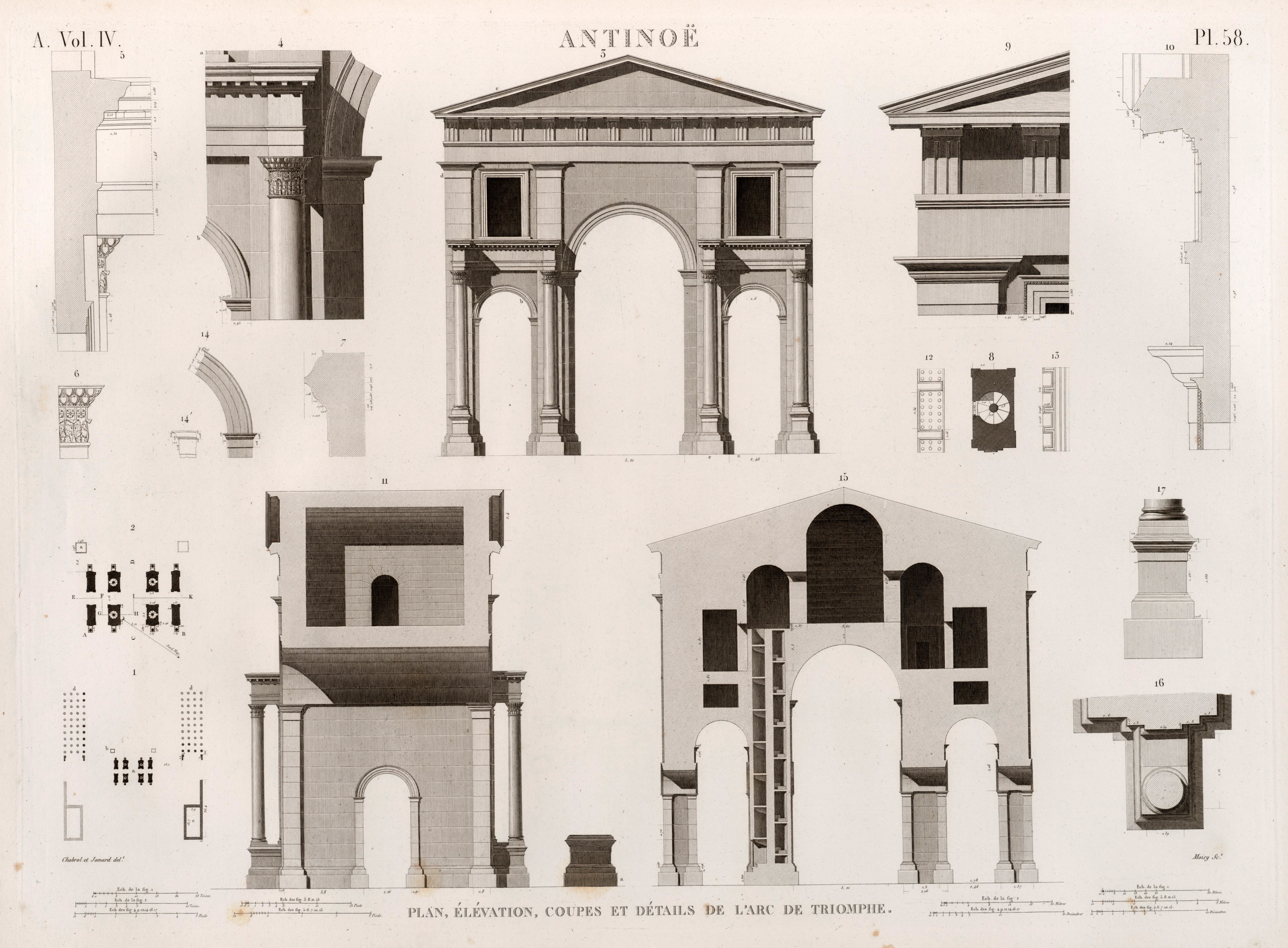
Plan, elevation, and section of the triumphal arch

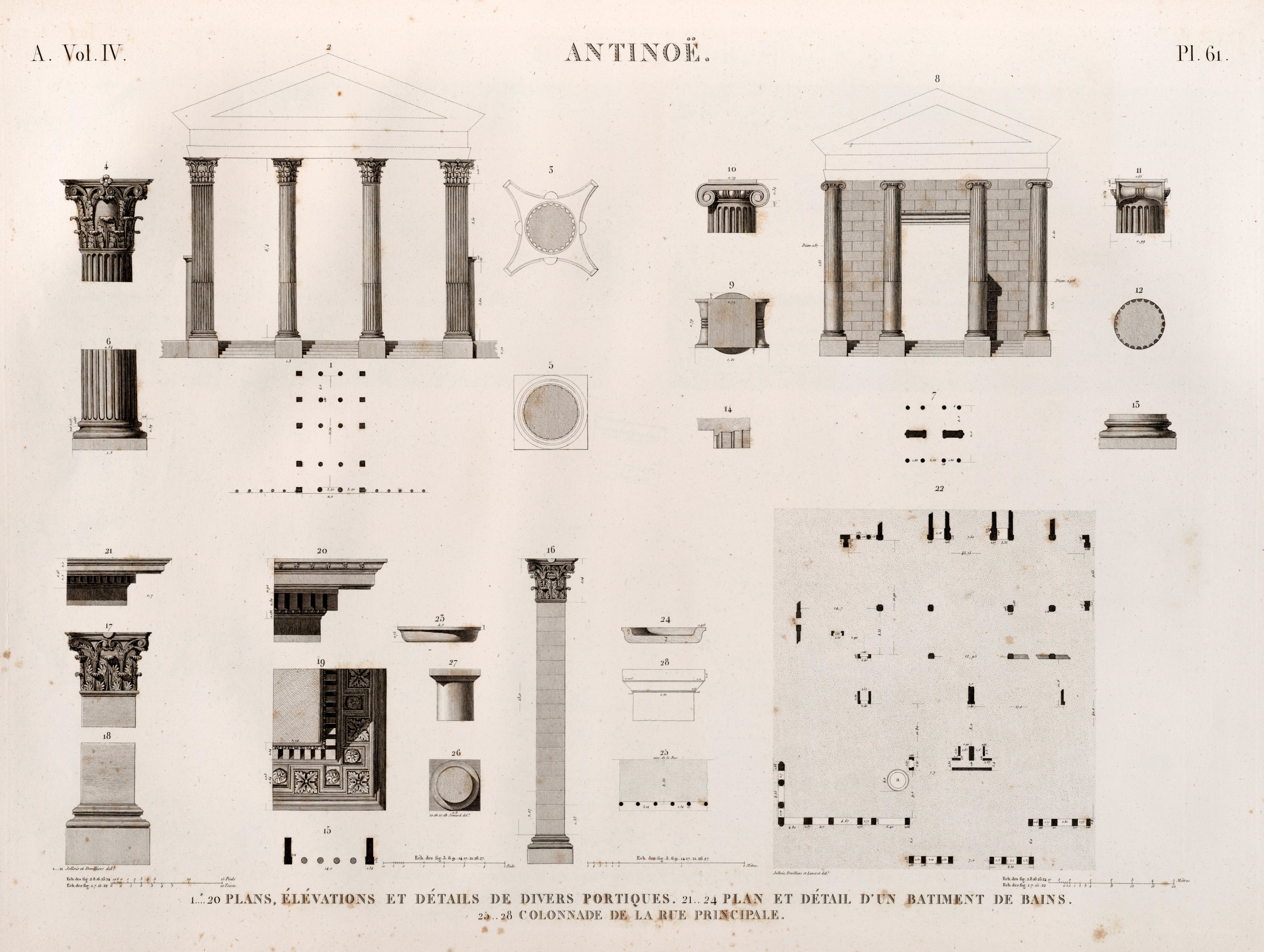
Various porticoes, a bathhouse, and the main colonnaded street

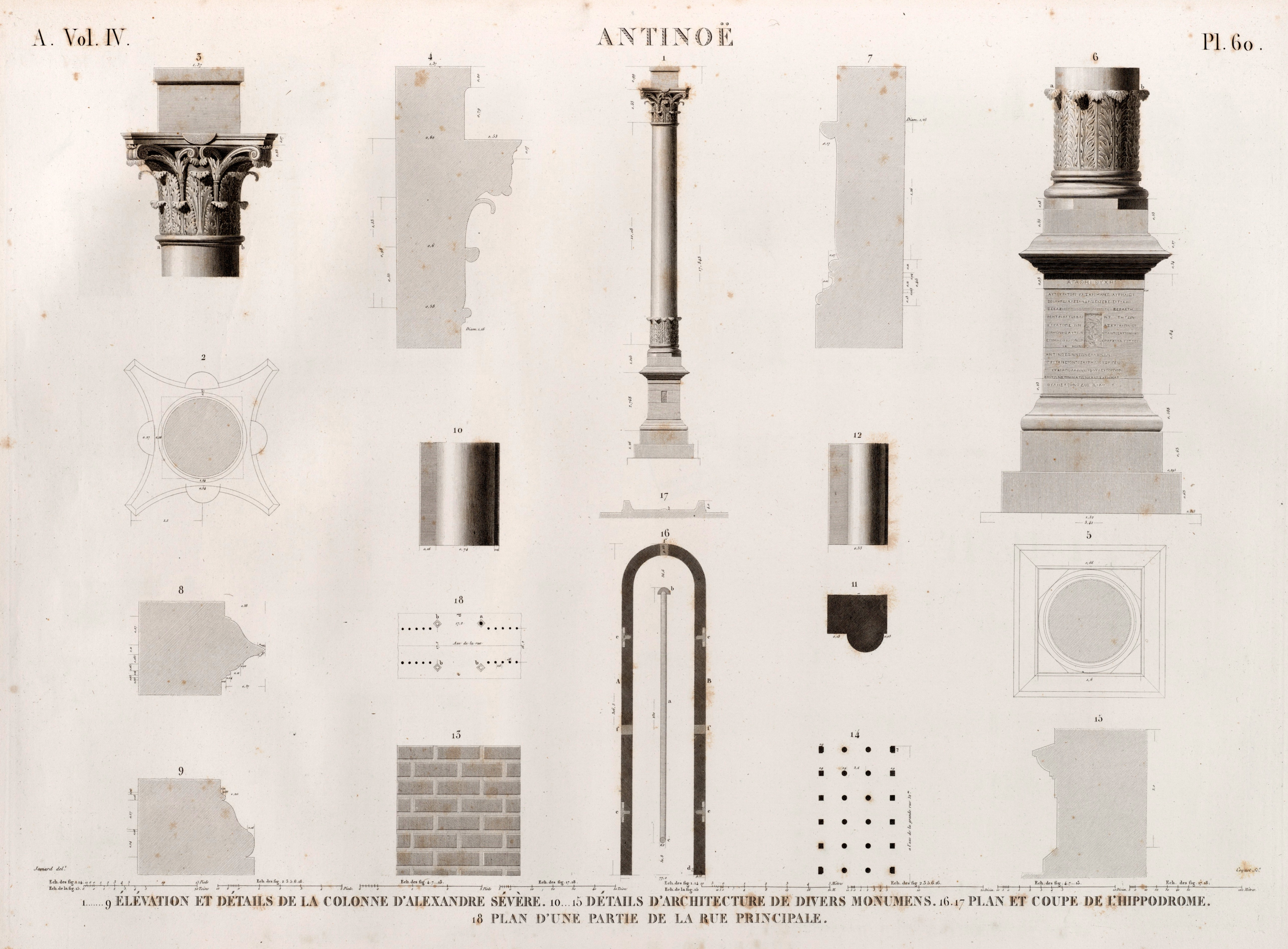
Column of Alexander Severus and the hippodrome

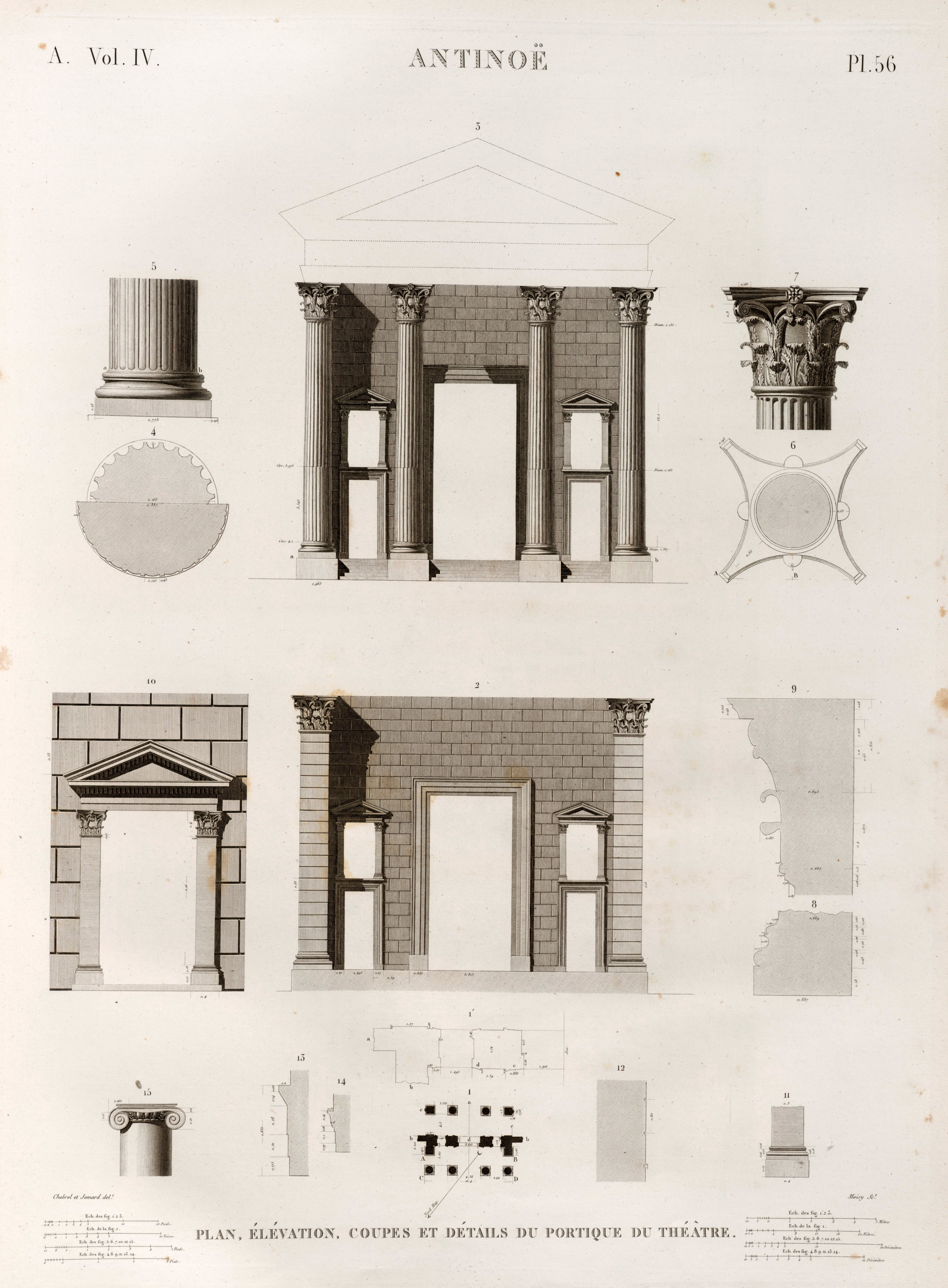
Plan and elevation of the portico of the Roman theatre

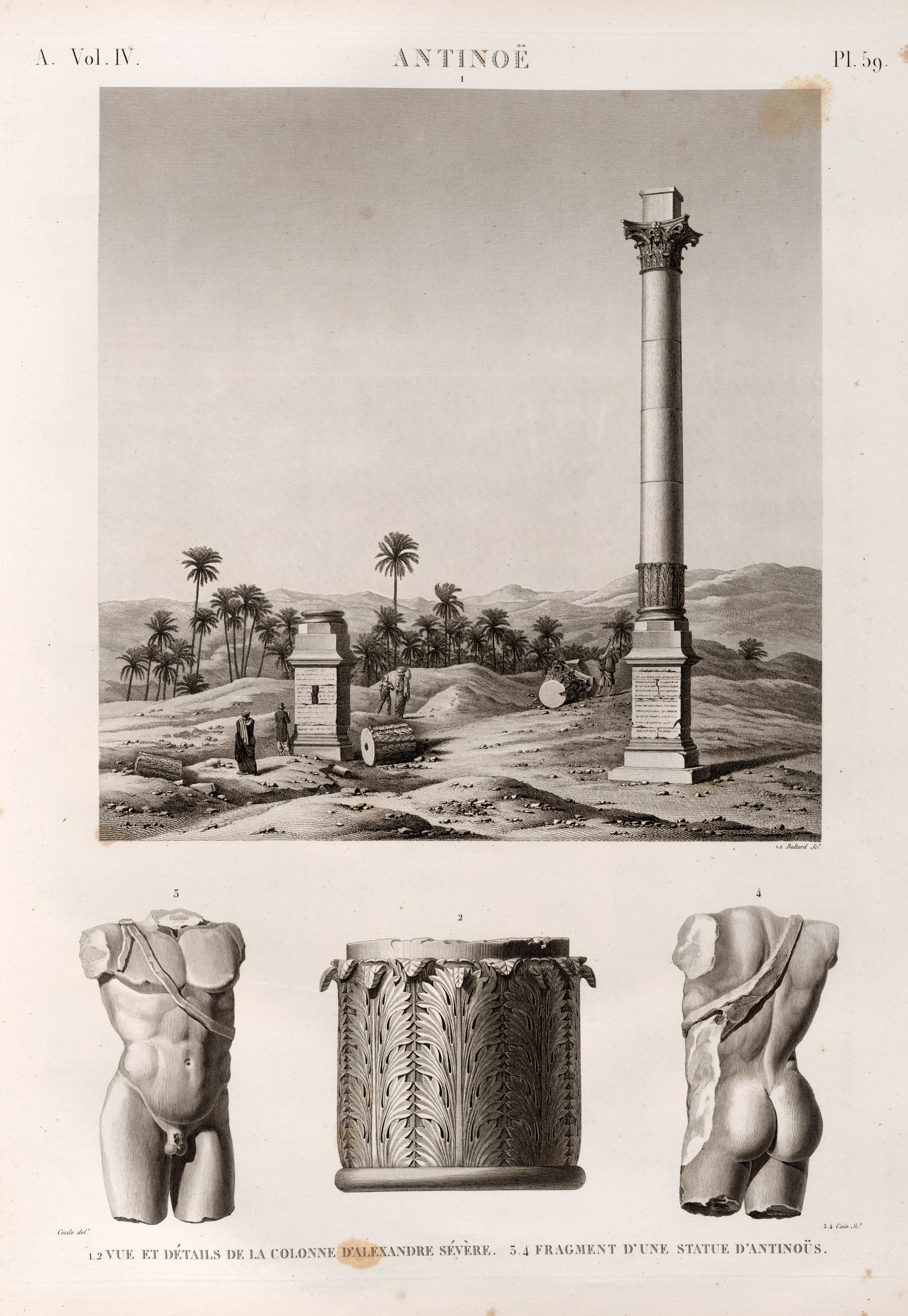
Column of Alexander Severus and a statue of Antinoüs

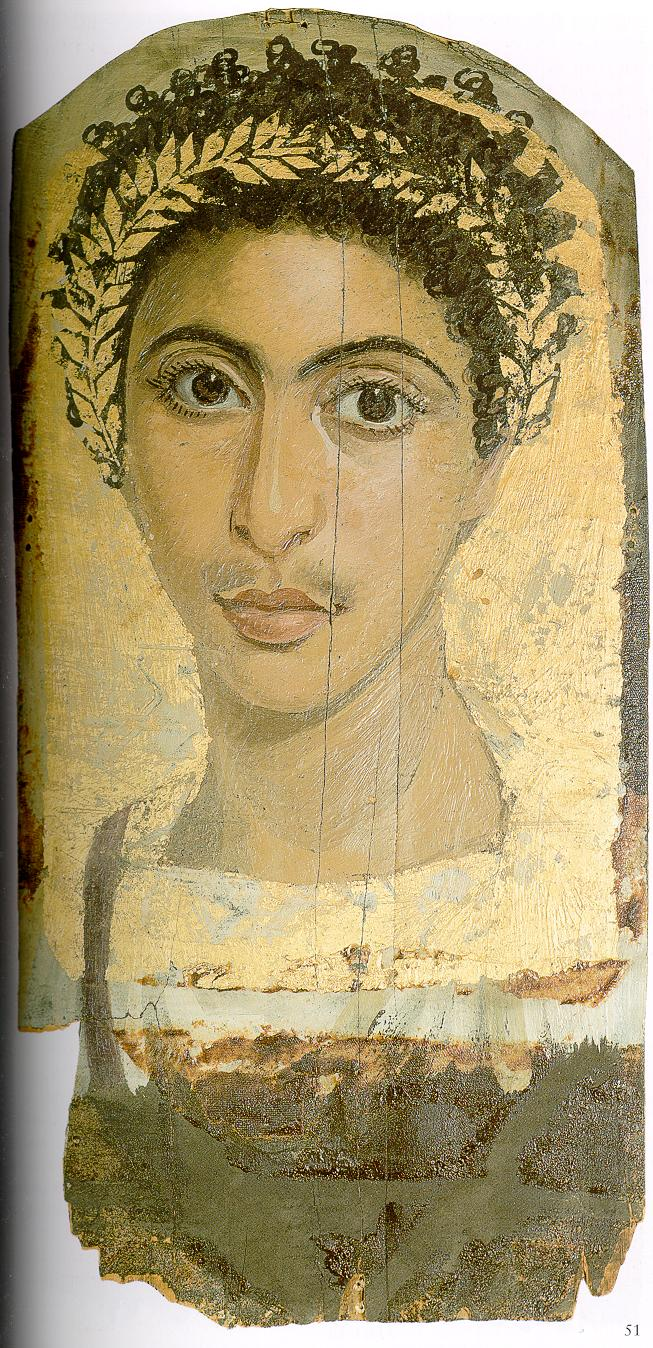
Funerary portrait of a man. Excavated by Albert Gayet (Egyptian Museum of Berlin)

=== Albert Gayet ===
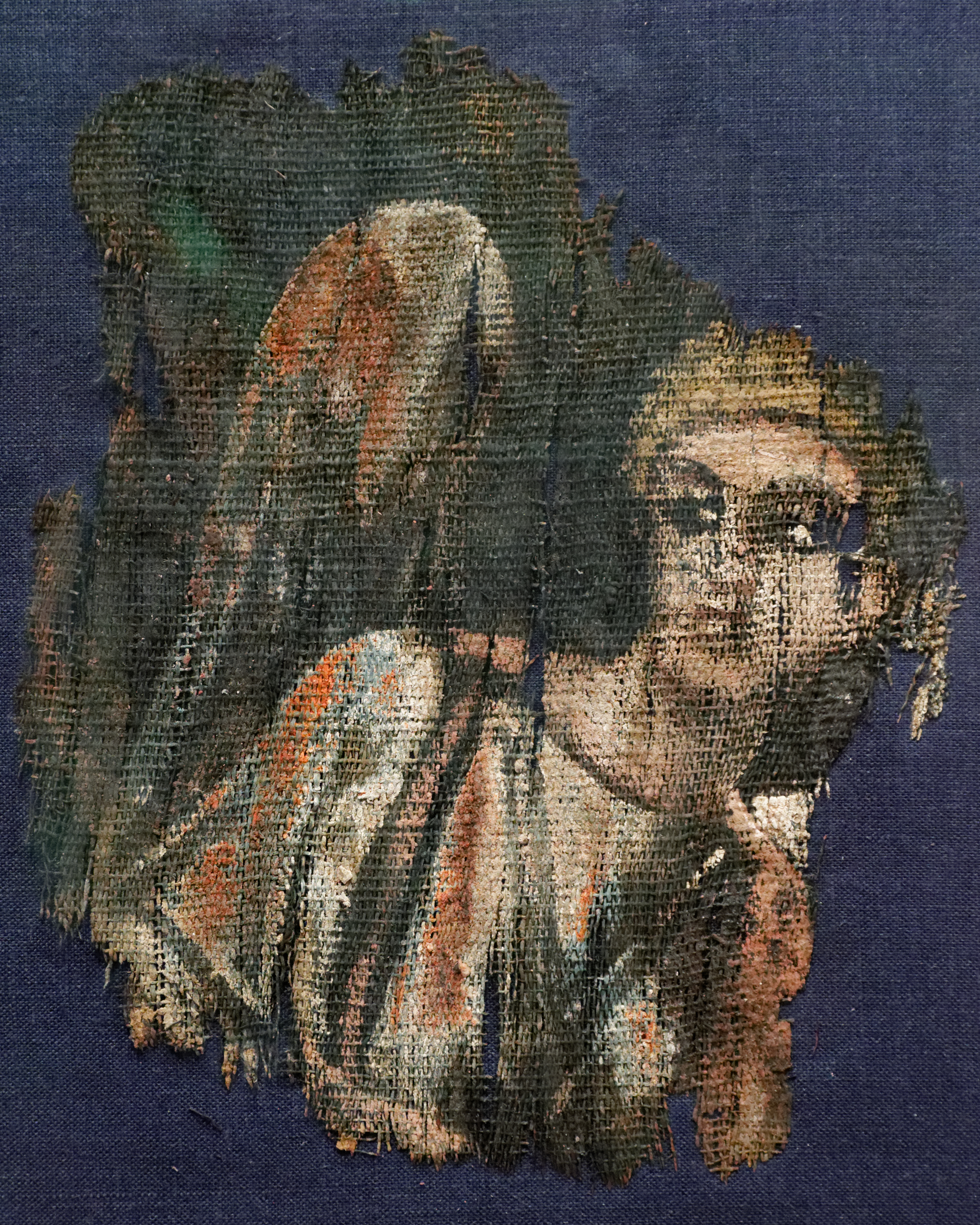
Painting of a winged female figure from late Roman or early Byzantine Antinoöpolis. Excavated by Albert Gayet (Louvre)

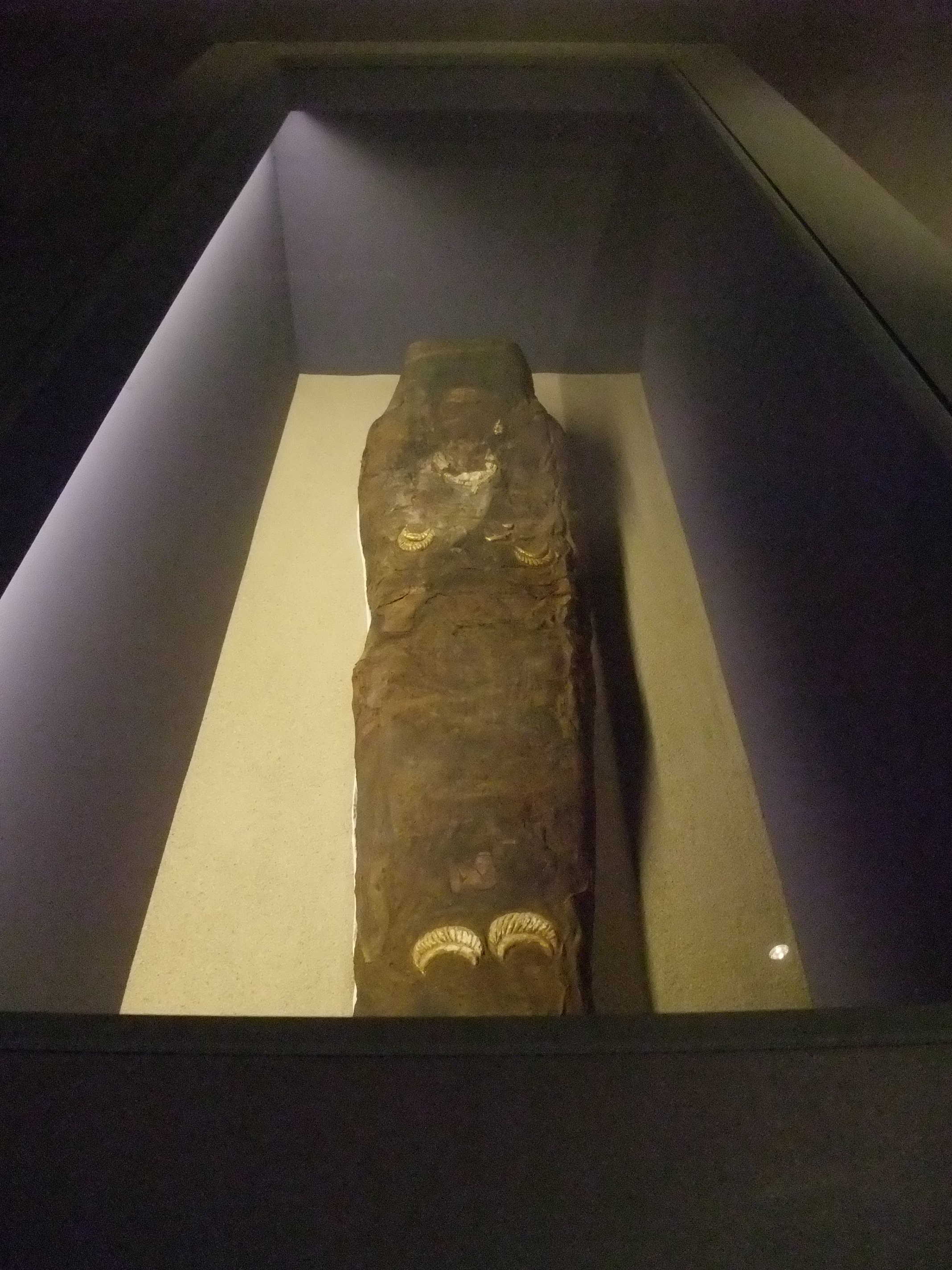
La dame d'Antinoë ("lady of Antinoöpolis") mummy with painted shroud, discovered 1909, restored 2008. (Musée des beaux-arts in Rennes)

Albert Gayet (1856–1916) was known as the "archaeologist of Antinoöpolis" and, without his extensive research and documentation of the site, very little would be known about this Greco-Roman city. Though there is much data of Antinoöpolis recorded from the Napoleonic Commission, Gayet's report sheds a greater light on the ancient city. As Christianity began to spread through the Roman Empire, Antinoöpolis became a place of worship. Centuries after the city of Antinoüs was established by the Roman emperor, Christianity became the way of life. The city was home to many nuns and monks and Christian sanctuaries were built. Many came to venerate saints, such as Claudius and Colluthus, and monasteries were abundant. Gayet's findings confirm the wide spread of Christianity. Gayet's excavations have revealed mummies, grave goods, and thousands of fabrics at the site of Antinoöpolis. Gayet uncovered a large cemetery, the burial place of numerous Coptic Christians. Mummification was prohibited by law in the fourth century A.D., and so the remains of deceased Christians were dressed in tunics and swaddled with other textiles before being buried. Gayet's findings give researchers a better understanding of early Christian burial practices and his preservation of artistic textiles found at the site show the evolving Coptic style. The transformation of style was the canonical art of ancient Egypt infused with Classical and then Christian art.

== Antinoöpolis today ==
Today, Antinoöpolis is the site of El Sheikh Ibada, a small village. Many of the original buildings have been broken down for materials to build newer structures, such as sugar factories for El-Rodah, but visitors can still see the remains of the Roman Circus and ruins of a few temples. Some excavations were undertaken by the University of Rome, 1965–68, with Sergio Donadoni. Papyri from the site were edited and translated by J. W. B. Barns and H. Zilliacus.

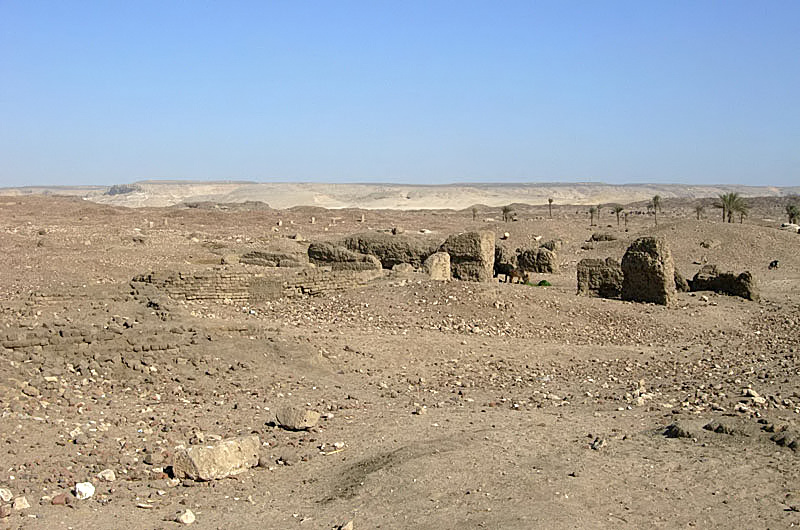
View of the Antinoöpolis ruin-field to the southeast in 2007

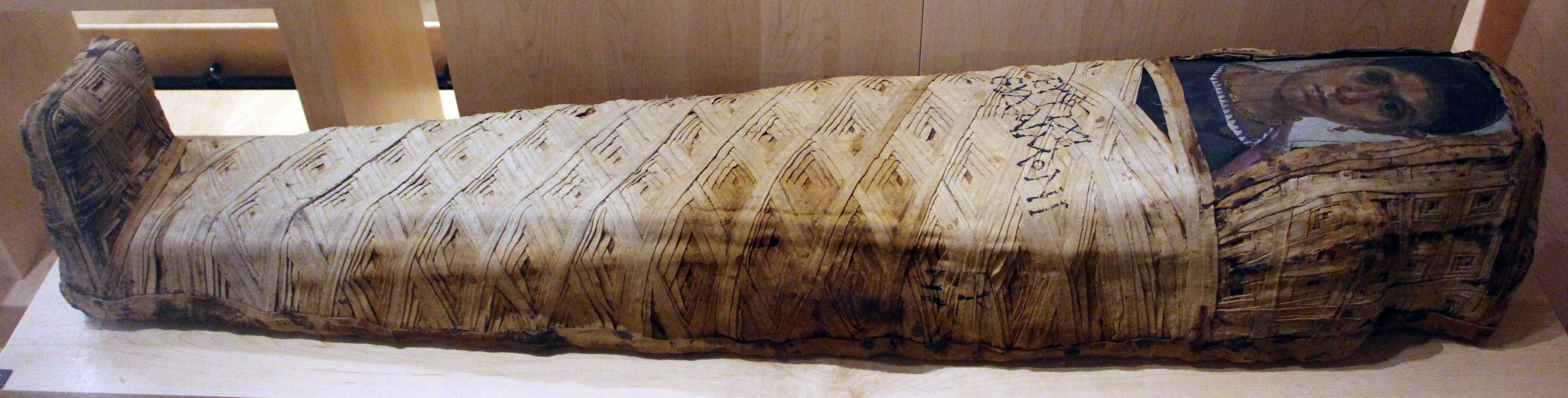
Εὐψύχι, εὐδαιμόνι - "Farewell, be happy!" Mummy with valedictory inscription and attached funerary portrait, probably from Antinoöpolis. Hadrianic period. Louvre inv. No. AF 6882.

== Bibliography ==
- Ptol. iv. 5. § 61; Paus. viii. 9; Dion Cass. lxix. 11; Amm. Marc. xix. 12, xxii. 16; Aur. Vict. Caesar, 14; Spartian. Hadrian. 14; Chron. Pasch. p. 254, Paris edit; It. Anton. p. 167; Hierocl. p. 730; Ἀντινόεια, Steph. B. s. v., also Adrianopolis, Steph. B. Ἁδριανούπολις)
- Antinoe - Catholic Encyclopedia article on the titular see
- Corcoran, Simon (2007), "Two tales, two cities: Antinoopolis and Nottingham", in Drinkwater, John; Salway, Benet (eds.), Wolf Liebeschuetz reflected: Essays presented by Colleagues, Friends, and Pupils BICS Supplement 91, University of London, School of Advanced Study, Institute of Classical Studies, pp. 193–209, ISBN 978-1-905670-04-8
- "Antinoopolis." The Global Egyptian Museum. Retrieved 10/24/2012. <http://www.globalegyptianmuseum.org/glossary.aspx?id=66>.
- Smith, William. (1854). "Antinoopolis." Dictionary of Greek and Roman Geography. 141. Retrieved 10/24/2012.
- Waters, Sarah. (1995). "The Most Famous Fairy in History": Antinous and Homosexual Fantasy." Journal of the History of Sexuality, 194-230. JSTOR 3704122
- O'Connell, Elisabeth R. (2014) 'Catalogue of British Museum objects from The Egypt Exploration Fund’s 1913/14 excavation at Antinoupolis (Antinoë),' in Antinoupolis II: Scavi e materiali III, ed. R. Pintaudi, 467–504 (Florence: Istituto papirologico “G. Vitelli,”)
