= Francesco Guerini =

Italian composer

Francesco Guerini (fl. 1740–1770) was a Neapolitan violinist and composer whose works were published throughout Europe in the mid 18th century. His birthdate is unknown. Guerini worked at The Hague for the Prince of Orange from 1740 until 1760. He moved to London in 1760. There, he played violin and composed until 1770. Most of Guerini's published compositions were sonatas for one or two violins and continuo. He also wrote Six Sonates / A deux Flûtes, ou deux Violons... Oeuvre III (with no continuo), Paris, ca. 1750, or Six Solos for a Violoncello with a Thorough Bass for the Harpsichord, Opus 9, first published in London in 1765. He composed some piano works as well.
